= List of members of the European Parliament for Lithuania, 2004–2009 =

Members of the European Parliament for Lithuania
Observers	(2003)
Delegation	(2004)
6th term	(2004)
7th term	(2009)
8th term	(2014)
9th term	(2019)
10th term	(2024)

This is a list of the 13 members of the European Parliament for Lithuania in the 2004 to 2009 session.

== List ==
Name	National party	EP Group
Laima Andrikienė	Homeland Union	EPP–ED
Šarūnas Birutis	Labour Party	ALDE
Danutė Budreikaitė	Labour Party	ALDE
Arūnas Degutis	Labour Party	ALDE
Jolanta Dičkutė	Labour Party	ALDE
Gintaras Didžiokas	Peasant Popular Union	UEN
Eugenijus Gentvilas	Liberal and Centre Union	ALDE
Ona Juknevičienė (Ona Rainytė-Bodard)	Labour Party / Lithuanian Centre Party	ALDE
Vytautas Landsbergis	Homeland Union	EPP–ED
Justas Vincas Paleckis	Social Democratic Party	PES
Rolandas Pavilionis	Order and Justice	UEN
Aloyzas Sakalas	Social Democratic Party	PES
Margarita Starkevičiūtė	Liberal and Centre Union	ALDE
