= Lithuania (European Parliament constituency) =

Constituency of the European Parliament

- European Parliament constituency
- Location among the current constituencies
- Member state: Lithuania
- Created: 2004
- MEPs: 13 (2004–2009); 12 (2009–2014); 11 (2014–present)

Lithuania is a European Parliament constituency for elections in the European Union covering the member state of Lithuania. It is currently represented by eleven Members of the European Parliament.

== Members of the European Parliament ==
Election	MEP ( party)	MEP ( party)	MEP ( party)	MEP ( party)	MEP ( party)	MEP ( party)	MEP ( party)	MEP ( party)	MEP ( party)	MEP ( party)	MEP ( party)	MEP ( party)	MEP ( party)
2004	Justas Vincas Paleckis (LSDP)	Aloyzas Sakalas (LSDP)	Šarūnas Birutis (Labour)	Danutė Budreikaitė (Labour)	Arūnas Degutis (Labour)	Jolanta Dičkutė (Labour)	Rolandas Pavilionis (PTT)	Eugenijus Gentvilas (LiCS)	Margarita Starkevičiūtė (LiCS)	Ona Juknevičienė (Labour)/ (Centre)	Laima Andrikienė (TS-LKD)	Vytautas Landsbergis (TS-LKD)	Gintaras Didžiokas (LVZS)
2006	Justas Vincas Paleckis (LSDP)	Aloyzas Sakalas (LSDP)	Šarūnas Birutis (Labour)	Danutė Budreikaitė (Labour)	Arūnas Degutis (Labour)	Jolanta Dičkutė (Labour)	Eugenijus Maldeikis (PTT)	Eugenijus Gentvilas (LiCS)	Margarita Starkevičiūtė (LiCS)	Ona Juknevičienė (Labour)/ (Centre)	Laima Andrikienė (TS-LKD)	Vytautas Landsbergis (TS-LKD)	Gintaras Didžiokas (LVZS)
2009	Justas Vincas Paleckis (LSDP)	Vilija Blinkevičiūtė (LSDP)	Zigmantas Balčytis (LSDP)	Valdemar Tomaševski (EAPL–CFA)	Viktor Uspaskich (Labour)	Juozas Imbrasas (PTT)	Rolandas Paksas (PTT)	Leonidas Donskis (LRLS)	Radvilė Morkūnaitė (TS-LKD)	Algirdas Saudargas (TS-LKD)	Laima Andrikienė (TS-LKD)	Vytautas Landsbergis (TS-LKD)	12 seats
2012	Justas Vincas Paleckis (LSDP)	Vilija Blinkevičiūtė (LSDP)	Zigmantas Balčytis (LSDP)	Valdemar Tomaševski (EAPL–CFA)	Justina Vitkauskaitė (Labour)	Juozas Imbrasas (PTT)	Rolandas Paksas (PTT)	Leonidas Donskis (LRLS)	Radvilė Morkūnaitė (TS-LKD)	Algirdas Saudargas (TS-LKD)	Laima Andrikienė (TS-LKD)	Vytautas Landsbergis (TS-LKD)	12 seats
2014	Bronis Ropė (LVŽS)	Vilija Blinkevičiūtė (LSDP)	Zigmantas Balčytis (LSDP)	Valdemar Tomaševski (EAPL–CFA)	Viktor Uspaskich (Labour)	Valentinas Mazuronis (PTT)/ (Labour)	Rolandas Paksas (PTT)	Petras Auštrevičius (LRLS)	Antanas Guoga (LRLS)/ (Ind.)	Algirdas Saudargas (TS-LKD)	Gabrielius Landsbergis (TS-LKD)	11 seats	
2016	Bronis Ropė (LVŽS)	Vilija Blinkevičiūtė (LSDP)	Zigmantas Balčytis (LSDP)	Valdemar Tomaševski (EAPL–CFA)	Viktor Uspaskich (Labour)	Valentinas Mazuronis (PTT)/ (Labour)	Rolandas Paksas (PTT)	Petras Auštrevičius (LRLS)	Antanas Guoga (LRLS)/ (Ind.)	Algirdas Saudargas (TS-LKD)	Laima Andrikienė (TS-LKD)	11 seats	
2019	Bronis Ropė (LVŽS)	Vilija Blinkevičiūtė (LSDP)	Juozas Olekas (LSDP)	Valdemar Tomaševski (EAPL–CFA)	Viktor Uspaskich (Labour)	Stasys Jakeliūnas (Ind.)/(LRP)	Aušra Maldeikienė (Ind.)/ (TS-LKD)	Petras Auštrevičius (LRLS)	Andrius Kubilius (TS-LKD)	Liudas Mažylis (TS-LKD)	Rasa Juknevičienė (TS-LKD)	11 seats	
2024	Aurelijus Veryga (LVŽS)	Vilija Blinkevičiūtė (LSDP)	Vytenis Povilas Andriukaitis (LSDP)	Valdemar Tomaševski (EAPL–CFA)	Petras Gražulis (TTS)	Virginijus Sinkevičius (DSVL)	Dainius Žalimas (LP)	Petras Auštrevičius (LRLS)	Andrius Kubilius (TS-LKD)	Paulius Saudargas (TS-LKD)	Rasa Juknevičienė (TS-LKD)	11 seats	
2024	Aurelijus Veryga (LVŽS)	Vilija Blinkevičiūtė (LSDP)	Vytenis Povilas Andriukaitis (LSDP)	Valdemar Tomaševski (EAPL–CFA)	Petras Gražulis (TTS)	Virginijus Sinkevičius (DSVL)	Dainius Žalimas (LP)	Petras Auštrevičius (LRLS)	Liudas Mažylis (TS-LKD)	Paulius Saudargas (TS-LKD)	Rasa Juknevičienė (TS-LKD)	11 seats	

== Current Members of the European Parliament ==
Name	National party	EP Group	Ref.
Vytenis Andriukaitis	Social Democratic Party	S&D	
Petras Auštrevičius	Liberal Movement	RE	
Vilija Blinkevičiūtė	Social Democratic Party	S&D	
Petras Gražulis	People and Justice Union	ESN	
Rasa Juknevičienė	Homeland Union	EPP	
Liudas Mažylis	Homeland Union	EPP	
Paulius Saudargas	Homeland Union	EPP	
Virginijus Sinkevičius	Union of Democrats "For Lithuania"	G-EFA	
Valdemar Tomaševski	Electoral Action of Poles	ECR	
Aurelijus Veryga	Lithuanian Farmers and Greens Union	ECR	
Dainius Žalimas	Freedom Party	RE	

== Elections ==
=== 2004 ===
The 2004 European election was the sixth election to the European Parliament. As Lithuania had only joined the European Union earlier that month, it was the first election European election held in that state. The election took place on 13 June. 2004.

=== 2009 ===
The 2009 European election was the seventh election to the European Parliament and the second for Lithuania. Lithuania's number of seats was reduced to twelve.

=== 2014 ===
The 2014 European election was the eighth election to the European Parliament and the third for Lithuania.

=== 2019 ===
The 2019 European election was the ninth election to the European Parliament and the fourth for Lithuania.

=== 2024 ===
The 2024 European election was the tenth election to the European Parliament and the fifth for Lithuania.
