= List of members of the European Parliament for Lithuania, 2024–2029 =

Members of the European Parliament for Lithuania
Observers	(2003)
Delegation	(2004)
6th term	(2004)
7th term	(2009)
8th term	(2014)
9th term	(2019)
10th term	(2024)

This is a list of the 12 members of the European Parliament for Lithuania in the 2024 to 2029 session. The members were elected in the 2024 European Parliament election in Lithuania.

== List ==
Name	National party	EP Group	Ref.
Vytenis Andriukaitis	Social Democratic Party	S&D	
Petras Auštrevičius	Liberal Movement	RE	
Vilija Blinkevičiūtė	Social Democratic Party	S&D	
Petras Gražulis	People and Justice Union	ESN	
Rasa Juknevičienė	Homeland Union	EPP	
Liudas Mažylis	Homeland Union	EPP	
Paulius Saudargas	Homeland Union	EPP	
Virginijus Sinkevičius	Union of Democrats "For Lithuania"	G-EFA	
Valdemar Tomaševski	Electoral Action of Poles	ECR	
Aurelijus Veryga	Lithuanian Farmers and Greens Union	ECR	
Dainius Žalimas	Freedom Party	RE	

== Replaced members ==
Name	National party	EP Group	Left office	Reason	Ref.
Andrius Kubilius	Homeland Union	EPP	30 November 2024	Appointed European commissioner	
