= List of members of the European Parliament for Lithuania, 2019–2024 =

Members of the European Parliament for Lithuania
| Observers | (2003) |
| Delegation | (2004) |
| 6th term | (2004) |
| 7th term | (2009) |
| 8th term | (2014) |
| 9th term | (2019) |
| 10th term | (2024) |

This is a list of members of the European Parliament for Lithuania in the 2019 to 2024 session. Lithuania has 11 seats for this session.

== List ==
| Name | National party | EP Group | Ref. |
|---|---|---|---|
| Petras Auštrevičius | Liberal Movement | ALDE | |
| Vilija Blinkevičiūtė | Social Democratic Party | S&D | |
| Stasys Jakeliūnas | Independent | G-EFA | |
| Rasa Juknevičienė | Homeland Union | EPP | |
| Andrius Kubilius | Homeland Union | EPP | |
| Aušra Maldeikienė | Independent / Homeland Union | EPP | |
| Liudas Mažylis | Homeland Union | EPP | |
| Juozas Olekas | Social Democratic Party | S&D | |
| Bronis Ropė | Lithuanian Farmers and Greens Union | G-EFA | |
| Valdemar Tomaševski | Electoral Action of Poles | ECR | |
| Viktor Uspaskich | Labour Party | ALDE / Non-Inscrits | |
