= List of members of the European Parliament for Lithuania, 2014–2019 =

Members of the European Parliament for Lithuania
Observers	(2003)
Delegation	(2004)
6th term	(2004)
7th term	(2009)
8th term	(2014)
9th term	(2019)
10th term	(2024)

This is a list of the 11 members of the European Parliament for Lithuania in the 2014 to 2019 session.

== List ==
Name	National party	EP Group
Petras Auštrevičius	Liberal Movement	ALDE
Zigmantas Balčytis	Social Democratic Party	S&D
Vilija Blinkevičiūtė	Social Democratic Party	S&D
Antanas Guoga	Liberal Movement (until 9 October 2016) Independent	ALDE (until 4 October 2016) EPP
Valentinas Mazuronis	Order and Justice (until 30 June 2015) Labour Party (until 6 November 2017) Independent	EFDD (until 15 October 2014) Non-Inscrits (until 19 October 2014) EFDD (until 18 May 2015) ALDE
Rolandas Paksas	Order and Justice	EFDD (until 15 October 2014) Non-Inscrits (until 19 October 2014) EFDD (until 18 May 2015)
Bronis Ropė	Lithuanian Farmers and Greens Union	G-EFA
Gabrielius Landsbergis (until 12 May 2016) Laima Andrikienė (from 30 May 2016)	Homeland Union – Lithuanian Christian Democrats	EPP
Algirdas Saudargas	Homeland Union – Lithuanian Christian Democrats	EPP
Valdemar Tomaševski	Electoral Action of Poles	ECR
Viktor Uspaskich	Labour Party	ALDE

== Notes ==
- European Parliament (2014). "European Parliament / Results of the 2014 European elections". European Parliament.
