= List of observers to the European Parliament for Lithuania, 2003–2004 =

Members of the European Parliament for Lithuania
Observers	(2003)
Delegation	(2004)
6th term	(2004)
7th term	(2009)
8th term	(2014)
9th term	(2019)
10th term	(2024)

This is a list of the 13 observers to the European Parliament for Lithuania in the 1999 to 2004 session. They were appointed by the Lithuanian Parliament as observers from 1 May 2003 until the accession of Lithuania to the EU on 1 May 2004.

== List ==
Name	National party	EP Group
Mindaugas Bastys	Social Democratic Party	PES
Kazys Bobelis	Christian Democrats	EPP–ED
Gintaras Didžiokas	Peasants and New Democratic Party Union	UEN
Kęstutis Kriščiūnas	Social Democratic Party	PES
Kęstutis Kuzmickas	New Union (Social Liberals)	NI
Vytautas Kvietkauskas	New Union (Social Liberals)	NI
Vytautas Landsbergis	Homeland Union	EPP–ED
Arminas Lydeka	Liberal Union	ELDR
Eugenijus Maldeikis	Order and Justice	EFD
Artūras Plokšto	Social Democratic Party	PES
Antanas Valys	Social Democratic Party	PES
Egidijus Vareikis	Homeland Union	EPP–ED
Birutė Vėsaitė	Social Democratic Party	PES

== Sources ==
- (in Lithuanian)
