= List of members of the European Parliament for Lithuania, 2009–2014 =

Members of the European Parliament for Lithuania
Observers	(2003)
Delegation	(2004)
6th term	(2004)
7th term	(2009)
8th term	(2014)
9th term	(2019)
10th term	(2024)

This is a list of the 12 members of the European Parliament for Lithuania in the 2009 to 2014 session.

== List ==
Name	National party	EP Group
Laima Andrikienė	Homeland Union	EPP
Zigmantas Balčytis	Social Democratic Party	S&D
Vilija Blinkevičiūtė	Social Democratic Party	S&D
Leonidas Donskis	Liberal Movement	ALDE
Juozas Imbrasas	Order and Justice	EFD
Vytautas Landsbergis	Homeland Union	EPP
Radvilė Morkūnaitė	Homeland Union	EPP
Rolandas Paksas	Order and Justice	EFD
Justas Paleckis	Social Democratic Party	S&D
Algirdas Saudargas	Homeland Union	EPP
Valdemar Tomaševski	Electoral Action of Poles	ECR
Viktor Uspaskich	Labour Party	ALDE
