= Arūnas Degutis =

Lithuanian politician

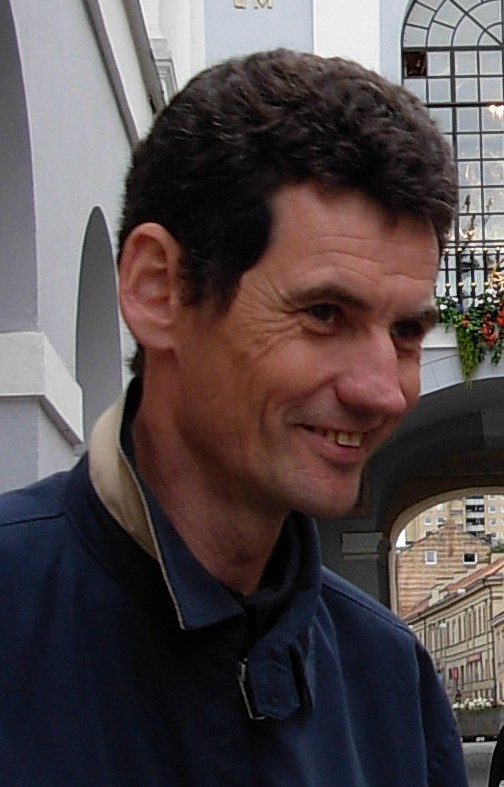

Arūnas Degutis (born 26 July 1958 in Kaunas) is a Lithuanian politician who was a signatory of the Act of the Re-Establishment of the State of Lithuania.
