= Waldemar Tomaszewski =

Polish-Lithuanian politician

Waldemar Tomaszewski MEP
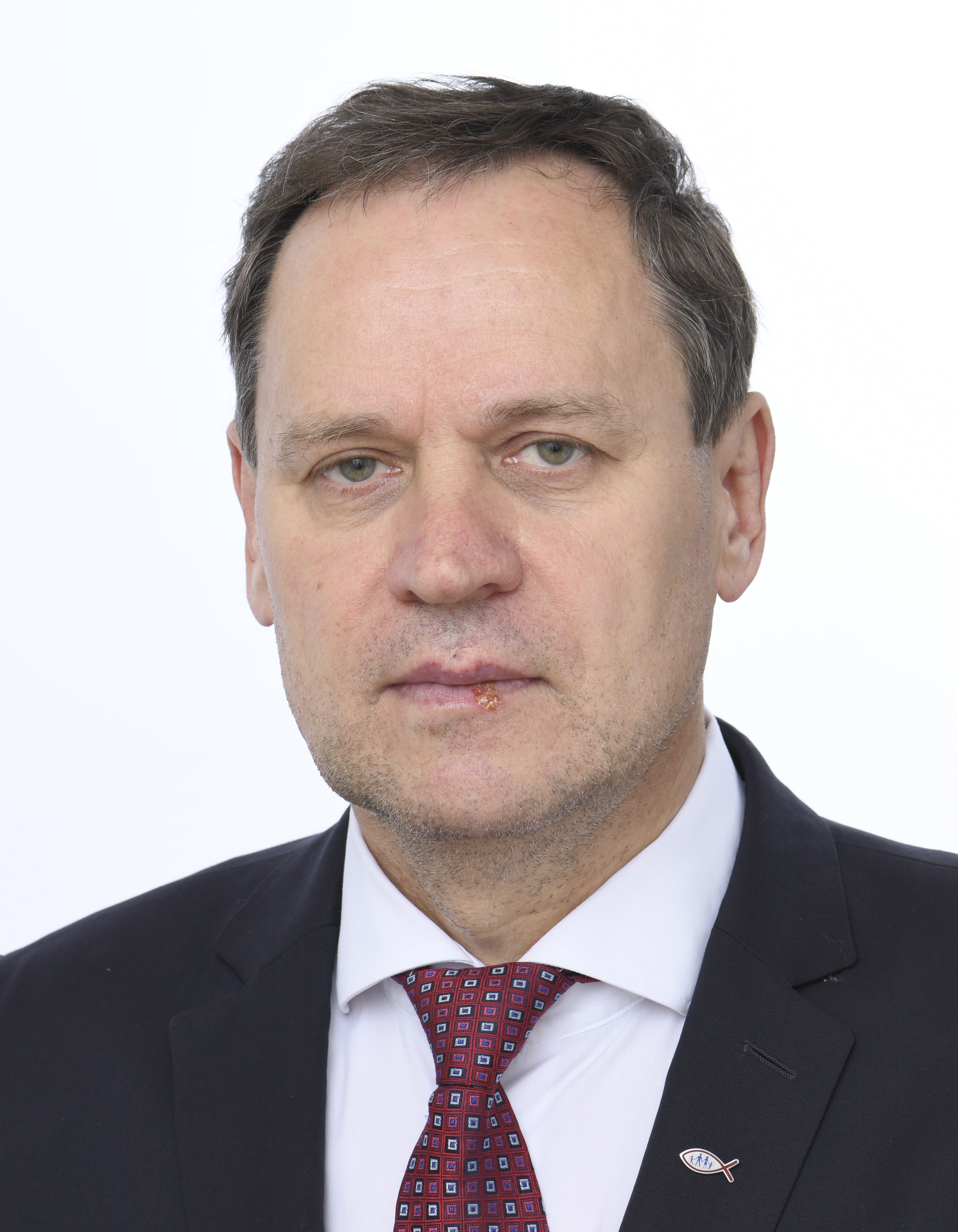

Member of the European Parliament
- Incumbent
- Assumed office 7 June 2009
- Constituency: Lithuania

Member of the Seimas
- In office 2000–2009
- Constituency: Šalčininkai

Personal details
- Born: 3 March 1965 (age 61) Vilnius, Lithuanian SSR, Soviet Union
- Party: Electoral Action of Poles in Lithuania – Christian Families Alliance
- Website: www.vtomasevski.lt

Waldemar Tomaszewski (former spelling Valdemar Tomaševski, born 3 March 1965) is a Polish-Lithuanian politician who is also an activist for the Polish minority in Lithuania and Member of the European Parliament (MEP). Leader of the Electoral Action of Poles in Lithuania (LLRA), Tomaszewski has been an MEP since 2009. He sits in the European Conservatives and Reformists group, of which he is a Member of the Bureau on the group executive.

== Biography ==
Tomaszewski studied mechanics at the Vilnius Civil Engineering Institute (now Vilnius Gediminas Technical University) in 1983 and graduated in 1990. First elected to Vilnius district council for Electoral Action in 1995, Tomaszewski was elected President of LLRaL in 1999. He was first elected to the Seimas at the 2000 election, winning 51% of the vote in the single-seat constituency of Šalčininkai. In the same year, he became deputy mayor of Vilnius district, serving from 2000 to 2003. Finding himself as one of only two LLRA members in the Seimas, during the parliamentary term, he moved between factions, including Homeland Union and Order and Justice.

Tomaszewski was re-elected to the Seimas in 2004 with 63% of the vote: one of five candidates in the country elected in the first round. He was re-elected again at the 2008 election, winning 61% of the vote: eight times his nearest competitor's share. In the May 2009 presidential election, he became the first presidential candidate nominated by LLRA. Receiving 4.7% of the national vote, Tomaszewski finished fourth, with Dalia Grybauskaitė winning comfortably.

The following month, he stood for election to the European Parliament. Winning 8.4% of the vote, up from 5.7% in 2004, LLRA won its first ever MEP, with Tomaszewski topping the list and being elected. He joined the European Conservatives and Reformists, and was appointed to the group's bureau. He was reelected for next terms in 2014, 2019 and in 2024.

He has been awarded the Commander's Cross of the Order of Merit of the Republic of Poland.

== See also ==
- Poles in Lithuania
