= Margarita Starkevičiūtė =

Lithuanian politician (born 1956)

Margarita Starkevičiūtė (born 1956) is a member of EU institutions' advisory boards on financial markets and the digital economy, external academic expert for European Parliamentary Research Services. In 2004-2009 she was a Member of the European Parliament (MEP) elected in Lithuania, ALDE political group, Economic and Monetary Affairs Committee, Budget Committee, Budgetary Control Committee, Temporary committee on policy challenges and budgetary means of the enlarged Union 2007-2013, Delegation for relations with Japan, Delegation for relations with Australia and New Zealand, Delegation for relations with Iran. PhD in socials science (economics) from Vilnius University (Lithuania),“Strategy of Long-Term Economic Growth in Transition and its Implementation in Lithuania”. The subject of research is the growth and strategy of economic policy. The aim is to evaluate the development of the economy in transition and applying modern growth model, to define the determinants and sources of long-term economic growth and to outline government economic policy strategy facilitating the growth of an economy. 1996-2004 and 2009-2014 was a lecturer, Associate Professor and researcher at Vilnius University. 1994–2001, a Head of Market Analysis Group, financial markets in Lithuania. 1978–1994, an economist and advisor for foreign relations, different Lithuania's public institutions and Ministries. Graduated in 1978 from Vilnius University with the degree in economics.
