= Danutė Budreikaitė =

Lithuanian politician

Danutė Budreikaitė (born May 16, 1953, in Vilnius) is a Lithuanian politician who was a Member of the European Parliament from 2014 to 2019 as part of the Alliance of Liberals and Democrats for Europe. Budreikaitė chose not to run for re-election in the 2019 European parliament elections.
