= Jolanta Dičkutė =

Lithuanian politician

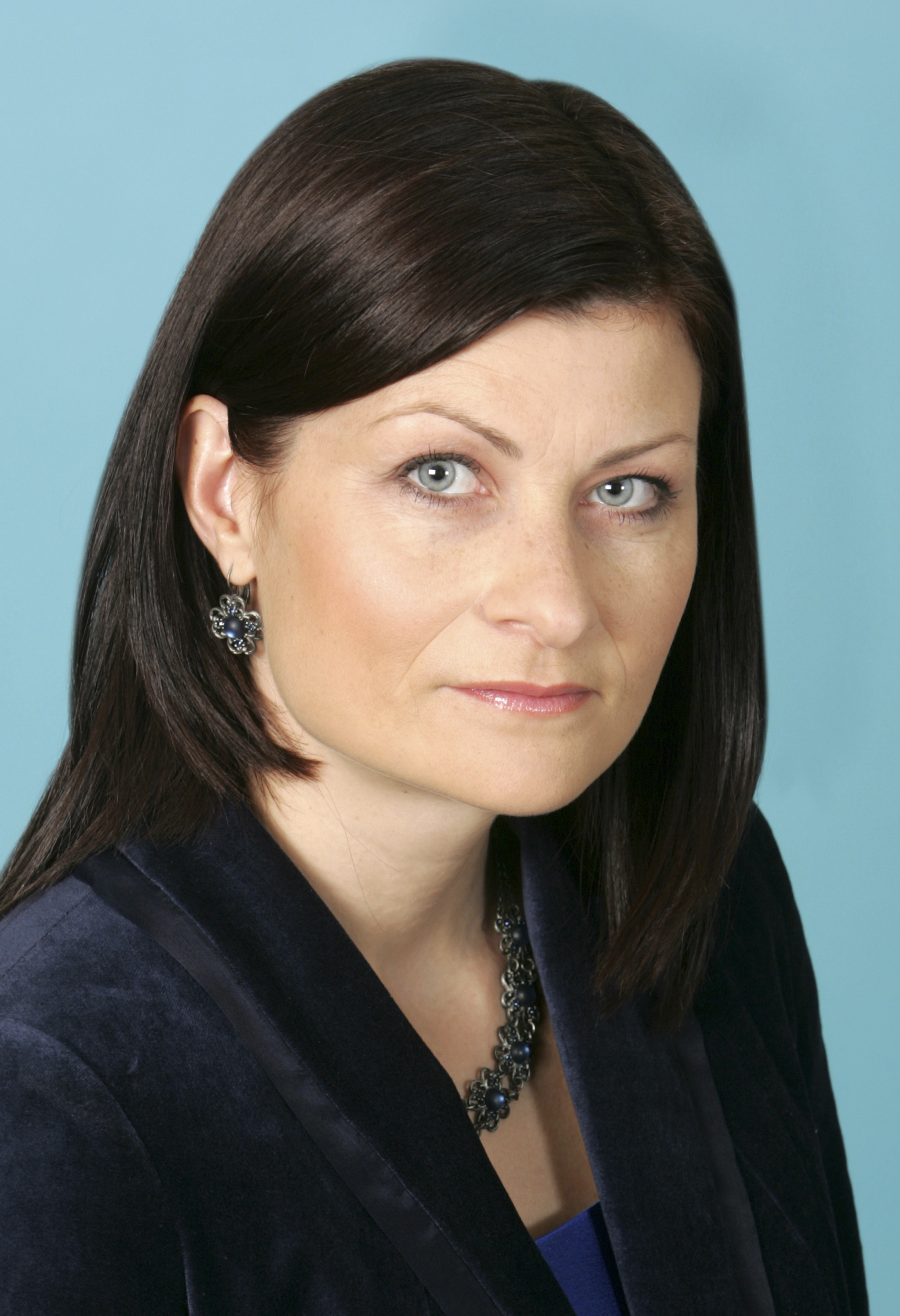
- Born: December 8, 1970; Kaunas, Lithuania
- Occupation: Politician
- Office: Member of the European Parliament
- Political party: Labour Party

Jolanta Dičkutė (born December 8, 1970, in Kaunas) is a Lithuanian politician and Member of the European Parliament for the Labour Party; part of the Alliance of Liberals and Democrats for Europe. She was studying at the Kaunas Medical University from 1989 to 2002 to earn PhD in public health.
