= Ona Juknevičienė =

Lithuanian politician

Ona Juknevičienė (born April 28, 1955, in Trakai) is a Lithuanian politician and former Member of the European Parliament, part of the European Democrat Party and Alliance of Liberals and Democrats for Europe.
