= Petras Auštrevičius =

Lithuanian politician

Petras Auštrevičius MEP
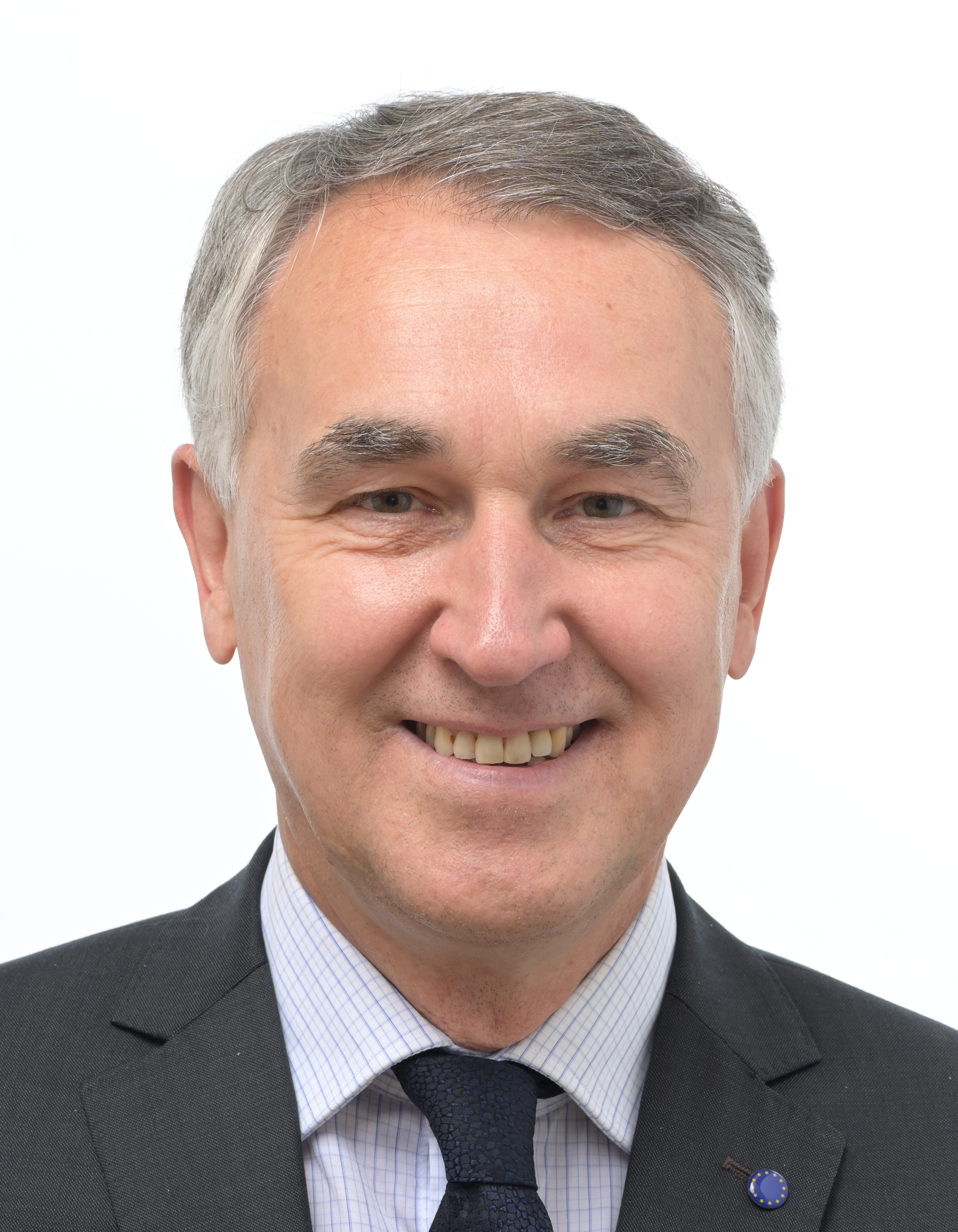

Member of the European Parliament
- Incumbent
- Assumed office 27 June 2014
- Constituency: Lithuania

Member of the Seimas
- In office 15 November 2004 – 17 November 2008
- Preceded by: Dalia Kutraitė-Giedraitienė
- Succeeded by: Mantas Adomėnas
- Constituency: Senamiestis-Žvėrynas
- In office 17 November 2008 – 27 June 2014
- Succeeded by: Arminas Lydeka
- Constituency: Multi-member

Personal details
- Born: 16 May 1963 (age 63) Juodšiliai, Lithuanian SSR, Soviet Union
- Party: Liberal Movement (2006–present)
- Other political affiliations: Liberal and Centre Union (2004–2006); Lithuanian Free Market Institute
- Spouse: Gintarė Auštrevičienė
- Children: 2
- Education: Vilnius State University; Lithuanian Academy of Sciences; Hoover Institution
- Occupation: Politician
- Website: austrevicius.lt

Petras Auštrevičius (born 16 May 1963) is a Lithuanian liberal politician, diplomat, civil society activist, former member of Seimas, and since 2014, a member of the European Parliament.

== Education and personal life ==
Auštrevičius was born in Juodšiliai. In 1981, Auštrevičius graduated from Vilnius Secondary School No. 39. Afterwards, he continued his studies at Vilnius University in the Faculty of Economics, where he received a degree in economics in 1986. He then worked as a Junior Research Fellow at the Institute of Economics, located at the Lithuanian Academy of Sciences, from 1988 to 1991. From 1992 to 1993, Auštrevičius pursued a diplomat-training program at the Hoover Institution at the Stanford University in California.

== Professional career ==
From 1991 to 1992, Auštrevičius worked as a Senior Specialist and was the First Secretary in the Ministry of Foreign Affairs (Lithuania). He was subsequently appointed as the Head of the Nordic States Division for the Ministry of Foreign Affairs, where he served from 1992 to 1993. In 1993, Auštrevičius became a Chargé d'Affaires ad Interim of the Republic of Lithuania to the Republic of Finland, a position he held until 1994. From 1994 to 1997, he served as Lithuania's Ambassador to Finland, and at the age of 31, became the youngest ambassador in Lithuanian history.

Following this placement, he worked as Adviser to the Prime Minister on Foreign Policy. Auštrevičius then became the Director General for the European Committee under the Government of the Republic of Lithuania in 1998, after which he acted as Chancellor in the Office of the Government from 1999 to 2000.

In 2000, he was appointed as an Ambassador at Large at the Ministry of Foreign Affairs. Afterwards, in 2002, Auštrevičius worked as a Chief Negotiator for Lithuania's Membership of the European Union.

From 2000 to 2003, he held the position of Director General at European Committee under the Government of the Republic of Lithuania, later serving as a lecturer at the Institute of International Relations and Political Science at Vilnius University from 2003 to 2004.

In 2004, Auštrevičius became a Deputy Chancellor of the Government for European Union Affairs.

== Political career ==
=== Member of the Lithuanian Parliament (2004–2014) ===
During a span of ten years (2004–2014), Auštrevičius was a member of Seimas (Lithuanian Parliament), where he served three terms until his election to the European Parliament in 2014.

Auštrevičius vigorously involved himself with Lithuanian foreign affairs and foreign policy fields, where he worked to develop Lithuania's relations with the EU. Initially, he served as the Deputy Speaker of the Board of the Seimas, the deputy chair at Committee on European Affairs, and a member of the Committee on Foreign Affairs. In addition to these positions, he acted as members of the Commission on the Problems of the Ignalina Nuclear Power Plant, the Commission for NATO Affairs, and the Conference of Chairs, also serving as Deputy Chair of the Seimas Delegation to the NATO Parliamentary Assembly.

Regarding his political affiliation, Auštrevičius was a member of the Liberal and Centre Union of Lithuania. However, in 2006, he co-founded the Liberals Movement of Lithuania, and from 2006 to 2008, served as its chairman.

=== Member of the European Parliament (2014–present) ===
In the 2014 European elections, Auštrevičius was elected as a member of European Parliament. At the European Parliament he serves on the Committee on Foreign Affairs (AFET) and was a chair the delegation for relations with Afghanistan for his second term already.

Petras Auštrevičius is European Parliament's standing rapporteur for Belarus (2019-2024). As such, on July 31, 2023, he proposed a resolution on relations with Belarus that the Parliament passed.

2014-2019 term

He was appointed as vice-president of the ALDE (Group of the Alliance of Liberals and Democrats for Europe) political faction for the period 2014–2017. Auštrevičius was acting as a coordinator for ALDE in the Subcommittee on Human Rights (DROI). In addition to these positions, he was a substitute member for each the Committee on Regional Development (REGI), Committee of Inquiry to investigate alleged contraventions and maladministration in the application of Union law in relation to money laundering, tax avoidance and tax evasion (PANA), the Delegation to the EU-Moldova Parliamentary Cooperation Committee, and the Delegation to the Euronest Parliamentary Assembly. Petras Auštrevičius was European Parliament's standing rapporteur on Moldova (2014-2019).

As a member of the Committee on Foreign Affairs, Auštrevičius was charged with assessing the European Union Association Agreement with Moldova for the Parliament.

2019-2024 term

During his second term in the European Parliament, Petras Auštrevičius was a full member of the Committee on Foreign Affairs (AFET), a coordinator for the Renew Europe group in the EP Subcommittee on Security and Defence (SEDE) and was a substitute member of the EP Committee on Transport and Tourism (TRAN). He was a chairman of the Working Group on Companion Animals at the EP's Intergroup on the Welfare and Conservation of Animals and a chairman of the group of friends of EP "European Ukraine".

2024-2029 term

Following the 2024 European Parliament election, he was elected to the European Parliament for the 3rd time. During 2024-2029 he is a full member of the Committee on Foreign Affairs (AFET), the Subcommittee on Human Rights (DROI), the Committee on Security and Defence (SEDE), the Delegation to the EU-Ukraine Parliamentary Association Committee (D-UA) and a substitute member of the Committee on International Trade (INTA) and the Delegation to the Euronest Parliamentary Assembly (DEPA). During the 10th European Parliament, Petras Auštrevičius is the European Parliament's standing shadow rapporteur on Ukraine, standing rapporteur on EU enlargement.

In 2015, news media reported that Auštrevičius was included in a Russian blacklist of prominent people from the European Union who are not allowed to enter the country.

== Awards ==
- Cross of Commander of the Order of the Lithuanian Grand Duke Gediminas (1998)
- Medal to commemorate Lithuania's membership of the EU and NATO (2004)
- Order of Honor of Georgia (2013)
- Order of Merit of Ukraine, Third Class (2015), Second Class (2024).

== Other Activities ==
- European Endowment for Democracy (EED), Member of the Board of Governors
- IGroup of Friends in Support of Democracy in Cambodia, Founder and Chairman (since 2017)
- Institute of Liberal Thought, Co-founder
- Lithuanian Free Market Institute, Co-founder

Auštrevičius was one of the initiators and supporters of the public movement Knowledge Economy Forum and public initiative People for Animals.

In 2005, he co-founded and served as a president of a discussion Europos Klubas (English: European Club) at Seimas, founded Vilnius University Alumni Society of the Faculty of Economics.

In December 2014, Auštrevičius founded the EU Informal Group "Friends of European Ukraine" in the European Parliament. He is a member of the board of the public organization 'Union of European Federalists in Lithuania'.

He is also currently the only Lithuanian MEP who is a member of the European Parliament Intergroup on LGBT Rights.

== Publications ==
- Rinkos Ekonomika ir Valstybės Reguliavimas (Market Economy and State Regulation)
- Šiuolaikinių Ekonomikos Terminų Enciklopedinis Žodynas (Encyclopedic Dictionary of Modern Economic Terms)
- Lithuania's Road to the European Union: Unification of Europe and Lithuania's EU Accession Negotiation, The Accession Story – The EU from Fifteen to Twenty-five Countries
- Co-author of 10 brochures; author of press articles
