= Gintaras Didžiokas =

Lithuanian politician

Gintaras Didžiokas (born 10 August 1966, Vilnius) is a Lithuanian politician and Member of the European Parliament for the Peasants and New Democratic Party Union; part of the Union for a Europe of Nations.
