= 2019 European Parliament election in Lithuania =

← 2014	26 May 2019	2024 →
- All 11 Lithuanian seats in the European Parliament
- Turnout: 53.48%
Party	Leader	Vote %	Seats	+/–
TS–LKD	Gabrielius Landsbergis	19.74	3	+1
LSDP	Gintautas Paluckas	15.88	2	0
LVŽS	Ramūnas Karbauskis	12.56	2	+1
DP	Viktor Uspaskich	8.99	1	0
LS	Eugenijus Gentvilas	6.59	1	0
AMT	Aušra Maldeikienė	6.51	1	New
LLRA–KŠS	Valdemar Tomaševski	5.50	1	0
This lists parties that won seats. See the complete results below.

The 2019 European Parliament election in Lithuania was held on 26 May 2019 to elect delegation from Lithuania to the European Parliament. It was part of the wider 2019 European election. The second round of the 2019 Lithuanian presidential election took place at the same time.

301 candidates from 16 parties stood for 11 seats.

== Results ==
The Homeland Union received the most votes (19.74 per cent) and most seats (3), although it won only in 12 (or just over one-fifth of) municipalities. The Social Democratic Party of Lithuania received 15.88 per cent of the votes and 2 seats. This party won in 35 municipalities. The Lithuanian Farmers and Greens Union received 12.56 per cent of the votes and 2 seats. This party won in 6 municipalities. The Labour Party received 8.99 per cent of the votes and won 1 seat. This party won in 1 municipality.

Although Order and Justice and the Social Democratic Labour Party of Lithuania failed to win seats, these parties managed to obtain pluralities in two municipalities (one municipality for each party).

Party	Votes	%	Seats
Homeland Union	248,736	19.74	3
Social Democratic Party	200,105	15.88	2
Lithuanian Farmers and Greens Union	158,190	12.56	2
Labour Party	113,243	8.99	1
Liberal Movement	83,083	6.59	1
Aušra Maldeikienė's Train	82,005	6.51	1
Waldemar Tomaszewski Bloc (LLRA–KŠS–LRS)	69,347	5.50	1
Lithuanian Centre Party	64,595	5.13	0
President Rolandas Paksas' Movement (VKM–PRPJ)	50,410	4.00	0
Vytautas Radžvilas: Recover the State! (VKM–VRSV)	42,228	3.35	0
Order and Justice	34,442	2.73	0
Social Democratic Labour Party	29,706	2.36	0
Lithuanian Green Party	28,562	2.27	0
Lithuanian Freedom Union (Liberals)	24,143	1.92	0
Strong Lithuania in United Europe	16,850	1.34	0
Decisive Leap	14,309	1.14	0
Total	1,259,954	100.00	11
Valid votes	1,259,954	94.59	
Invalid/blank votes	72,066	5.41	
Total votes	1,332,020	100.00	
Registered voters/turnout	2,490,542	53.48	
Source: VRK

== See also ==
- Lithuania (European Parliament constituency)
- List of members of the European Parliament for Lithuania, 2019–24
- Members of the European Parliament 2019–2024
