= Liberals' Movement (Lithuania) =

Lithuanian political party

Liberals' Movement Liberalų sąjūdis
- Abbreviation: LS
- Chairperson: Viktorija Čmilytė-Nielsen
- First vice chair: Edita Rudelienė
- Deputy chairpersons: Šarūnas Čėsna; Vitalijus Gailius; Eugenijus Gentvilas; Simonas Gentvilas; Simonas Kairys; Audrius Klišonis; Matas Lasauskas
- Executive secretary: Antanas Martusevičius
- Founded: 25 February 2006; 20 years ago
- Split from: Liberal and Centre Union
- Headquarters: Gedimino pr. 64, Vilnius
- Ideology: Conservative liberalism; Classical liberalism
- Political position: Centre to centre-right
- European affiliation: Alliance of Liberals and Democrats for Europe
- European Parliament group: Renew Europe
- Colours: Orange
- Seimas: 11 / 141 (8%)
- European Parliament: 1 / 11 (9%)
- Municipal councils: 143 / 1,473
- Mayors: 9 / 60

Website
- liberalai.lt

The Liberals' Movement (Lithuanian: Liberalų sąjūdis; LS) is a conservative-liberal political party in Lithuania.

== History ==
Party's logo (2006–2022)

=== Foundation, participation in the government and growth (2006–2016) ===
The party was founded in 2006 by dissident members of the Liberal and Centre Union that were unhappy with Artūras Zuokas's leadership.

In the summer of 2006, the Liberal Movement started cooperating with the Homeland Union (as the Liberal and Centre Union) before joining the Kirkilas Cabinet. In the 2007 municipal elections the party received 4.66 per cent of the national vote.

In the legislative elections of 2008, it gained 11 seats in the Seimas and 5.72 percent of the national vote. The LRLS formed a coalition with the Homeland Union, the Liberal and Centre Union, and the National Resurrection Party. This coalition gained a combined governmental majority of 80 out of 141 seats in the Seimas, led by Prime Minister Andrius Kubilius of the Homeland Union. At the subsequent elections of 2012, the party lost one seat to finish with 10 seats in the Seimas and 8.57 percent of the national vote.

Just month before the 2011 municipal election, the party started to describe itself as "rational mind right-wingers" (Lithuanian: sveiko proto dešinieji), which amplified the possibility to win over the Liberal and Centre Union and the Homeland Union. The party's support started to grow. In the 2014 European Parliament election and the 2015 municipal election the party received 16.55 and 15.49 per cent of the national vote respectively. This growth was mainly at expense of the Liberal and Centre Union and the Lithuanian Freedom Union (Liberals), which received 1.48 and per 4.91 cent of national vote 2014 and 2015 elections respectively. It was also attributed to the previously undecided voters or voters of other parties (the Homeland Union, the Order and Justice and Labour Party).

=== Corruption scandal, decline, internal disagreements and joining the government for the second time (since 2016) ===
After the party's leader Eligijus Masiulis allegedly took a bribe of 106,000 euros, Antanas Guoga temporarily took his position on 13 May 2016. He was the chairman for four days only before resigning. One month later, the mayor of Vilnius Remigijus Šimašius was elected as party's chairman.

The Šimašius leadership did not last long, and in 2017 Eugenijus Gentvilas was elected as the new leader.

In preparations for the 2019 municipal elections, several district committees (most notably in Vilnius, Klaipėda and Varėna districts) decided to form public election committees. The Liberal Movement Board annulled their district committees' decisions. In return, the leaders of the district committees of Vilnius, Klaipėda and Varėna districts (Aušrinė Armonaitė, Vytautas Grubliauskas and Algis Kašėta respectively) resigned from their positions or left the party altogether.

One of these public election committees, "For Vilnius, which we are proud of!", in summer of 2019 formed a basis for a new party, the Freedom Party. Other aforementioned public election committees (alongside one in Elektrėnai) joined the new party as well.

On the other hand, the public election committee "For changes in Pagėgiai area" prior to the 2020 parliamentary election joined the Lithuanian Farmers and Greens Union, while most of the members of the Order and Justice Party (which dissolved itself in 2020) in the same area became members of the Liberal Movement.

In 2020 parliamentary election the Liberals' Movement managed to obtain seven per cent of votes. It later joined in a coalition with the Homeland Union and the Freedom Party. In 2022, the party changed its name (removing the reference to the Republic of Lithuania) and logo.

== Ideology ==
The Liberals' Movement is generally described as a centrist or centre-right party.

The party is economically liberal and ran on a platform of cutting taxation and legalizing gender-neutral partnerships during the 2020 Lithuanian parliamentary election.

It supports the European Green Deal, strengthening the Common Security and Defence Policy and wider adoption of qualified majority in the Council of the European Union.

A conservative faction exists within the party, named "agroliberals" (Lithuanian: agroliberalai). Five members of the Seimas belonging to the Liberals' Movement in the Thirteenth Seimas – Romualdas Vaitkus, Juozas Baublys, Ričardas Juška, Viktoras Pranckietis and Jonas Varkalys – are considered to be members of the faction. During the term, this faction opposed same-sex partnerships, decriminalization of small quantities of narcotics, and mandatory vaccinations for doctors and social workers.

== Popular support ==
Main party support is coming from urban areas (notably, from Klaipėda). The party receives support from rural areas as well, but this support comes from suburbs of towns closer to the cities (e. g. Gargždai, Jurbarkas).

== Election results ==
=== Seimas ===
Election	Leader	Votes (Note: Proportional representation votes.)	%	Seats	+/–	Government
2008	Eligijus Masiulis	70,862	5.73 (#6)	11 / 141	New	Coalition
2012	Eligijus Masiulis	117,476	8.95 (#4)	10 / 141	▼1	Opposition
2016	Remigijus Šimašius	115,361	9.45 (#4)	14 / 141	▲4	Opposition
2020	Viktorija Čmilytė-Nielsen	79,755	7.04 (#6)	13 / 141	▼1	Coalition
2024	Viktorija Čmilytė-Nielsen	95,868	7.85 (#5)	12 / 141	▼1	Opposition

=== European Parliament ===
Election	List leader	Votes	%	Seats	+/–	EP Group
2009	Leonidas Donskis	40,502	7.36 (#6)	1 / 11	New	ALDE
2014	Antanas Guoga	189,373	16.55 (#3)	2 / 11	▲1	ALDE
2019	Petras Auštrevičius	83,083	6.59 (#5)	1 / 11	▼1	RE
2024	Eugenijus Gentvilas	36,640	5.42 (#8)	1 / 11	0	RE

== Members of the European Parliament ==
Parliamentarian	Occupation	From
Petras Auštrevičius	Diplomat	2014

== Members of Seimas ==
Parliamentarian	Previous mandate	Current mandate from	Constituency
Virgilijus Alekna	–	2016	Nationwide
Viktorija Čmilytė-Nielsen	–	2015	Senamiesčio-Žveryno
Vitalijus Gailius	–	2012	Nationwide
Eugenijus Gentvilas	1990–1992	2012	Nationwide
Simonas Gentvilas	–	2016	Nationwide
Ričardas Juška	–	2016	Karšuvos
Arminas Lydeka	-	2000	Nationwide
Viktoras Pranckietis	-	2016	Nationwide
Andrius Bagdonas	-	2020	Nationwide
Edita Rudelienė	-	2020	Nationwide
Simonas Kairys	-	2024	Centro-Žaliakalnio (Kaunas)

== Mayors ==
Mayor	Municipality
Gediminas Čepulis	Joniškio rajonas
Antanas Černeckis	Rietavas
Saulius Grinkevičius	Kėdainiai
Algis Kašėta	Varėnos rajonas
Audrius Klišonis	Plungės rajonas
Sigitas Mičiulis	Tauragės rajonas
Andrius Šatevičius	Trakų rajonas
Kęstutis Vaitukaitis	Elektrėnų rajonas

== Vice-mayors ==
Vice-mayor	Municipality
Jonas Eugenijus Bačinskas	Rietavas
Kęstutis Bagdanavičius	Kalvarijos
Simonas Kairys	Kaunas
Algis Mačiulis	Šiaulių rajonas
Apolinaras Nicius	Akmenės rajonas
Danutė Skruibienė	Kretingos rajonas
Judita Simonavičiūtė	Klaipėda
Valdas Petras Mikelionis	Lazdijų rajonas
Artūras Šulcas	Klaipėdos rajonas

== See also ==
- Liberalism in Lithuania
- Lithuanian Liberal Youth
- List of political parties in Lithuania
