= 2024 European Parliament election in Lithuania =

- 9 June 2024

All 11 Lithuanian seats to the European Parliament
- Turnout: 28.94% (▼24.54pp)
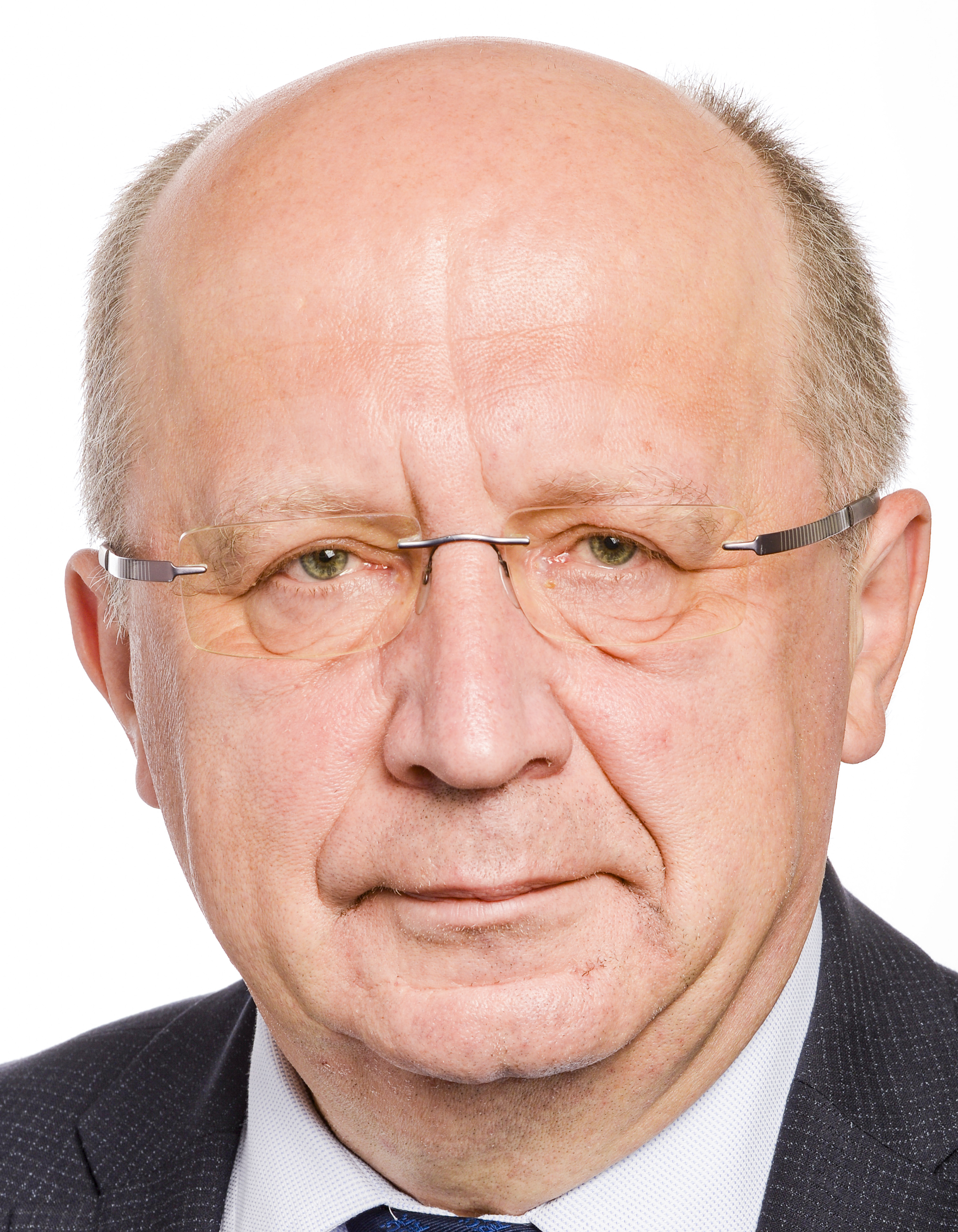

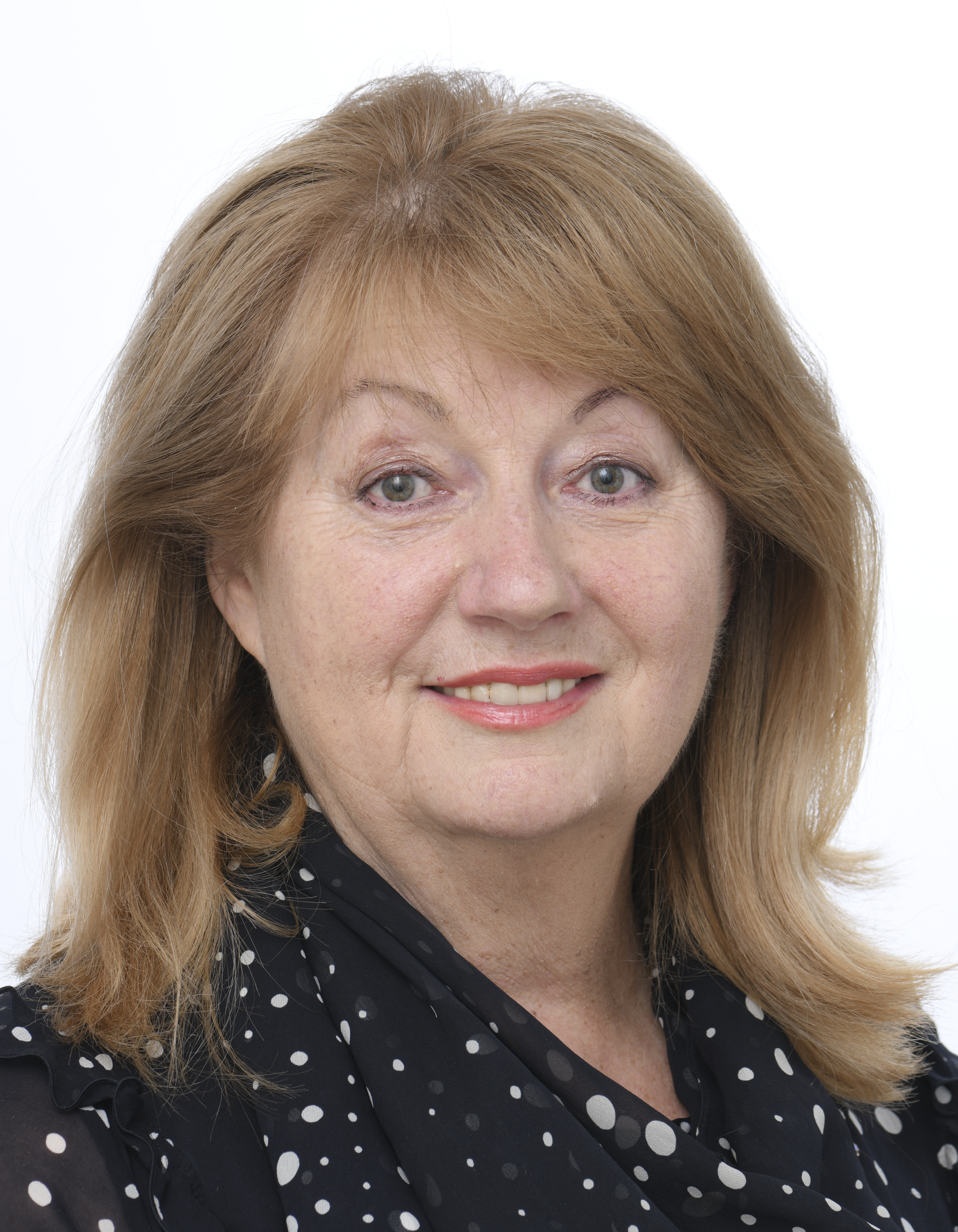

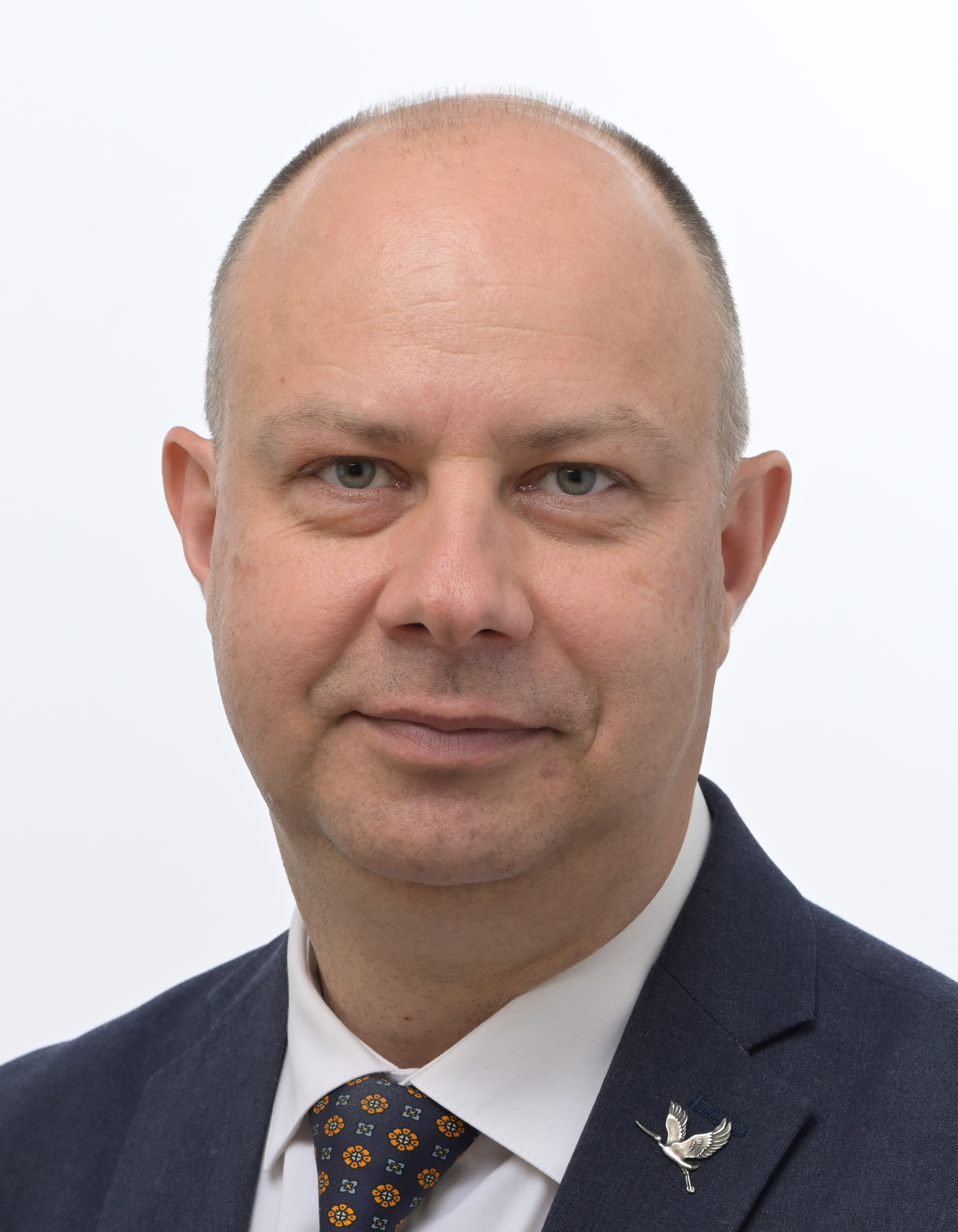

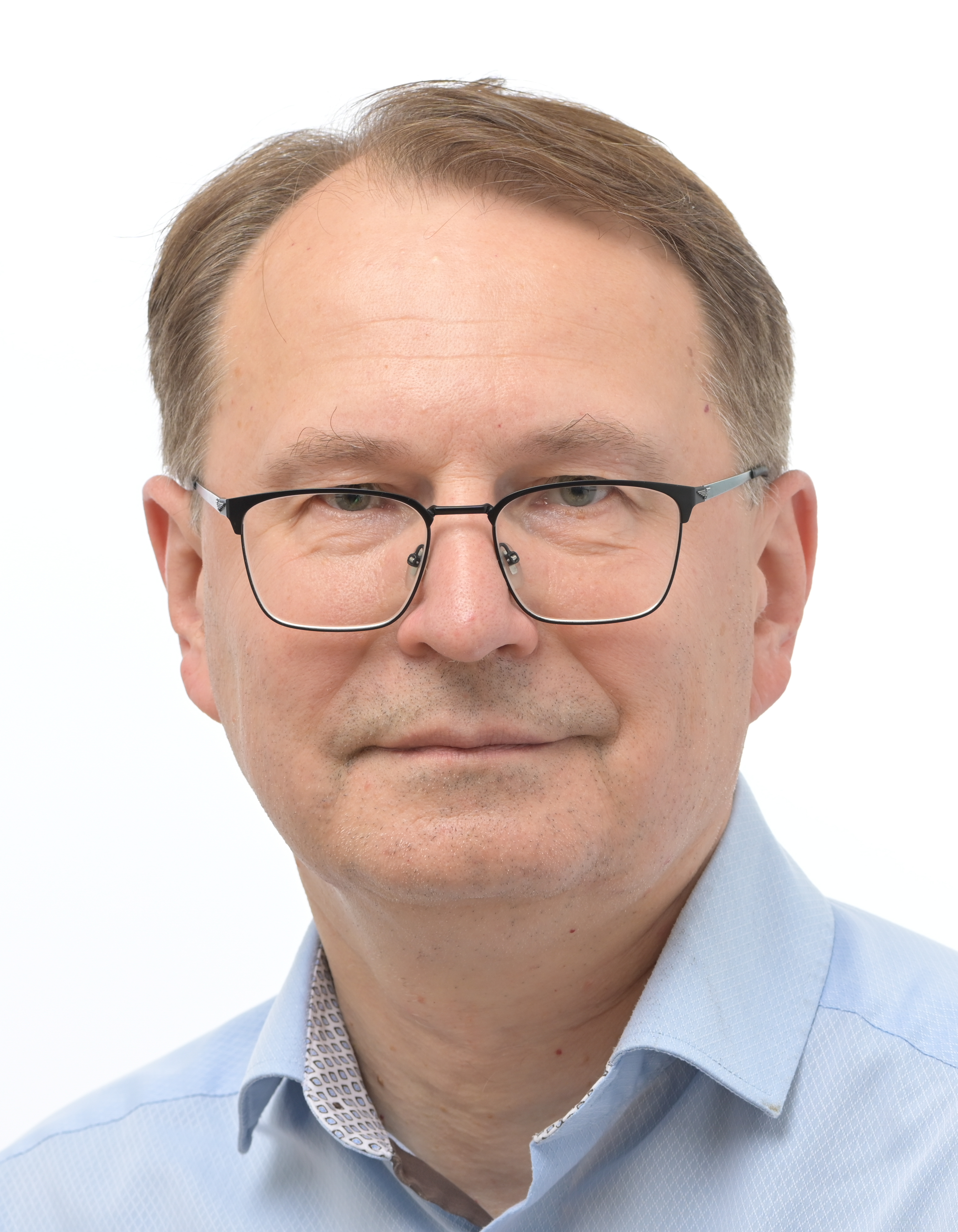

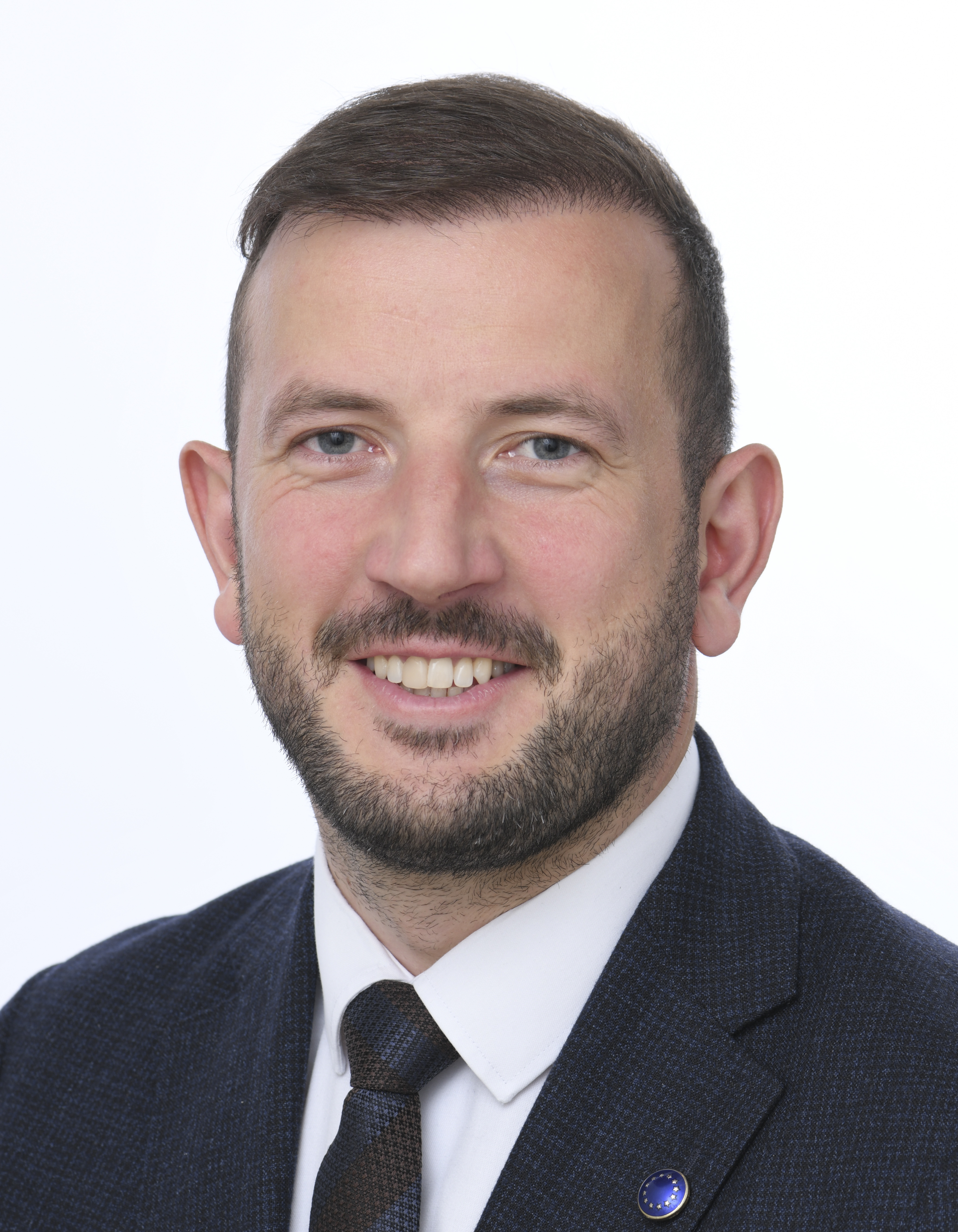

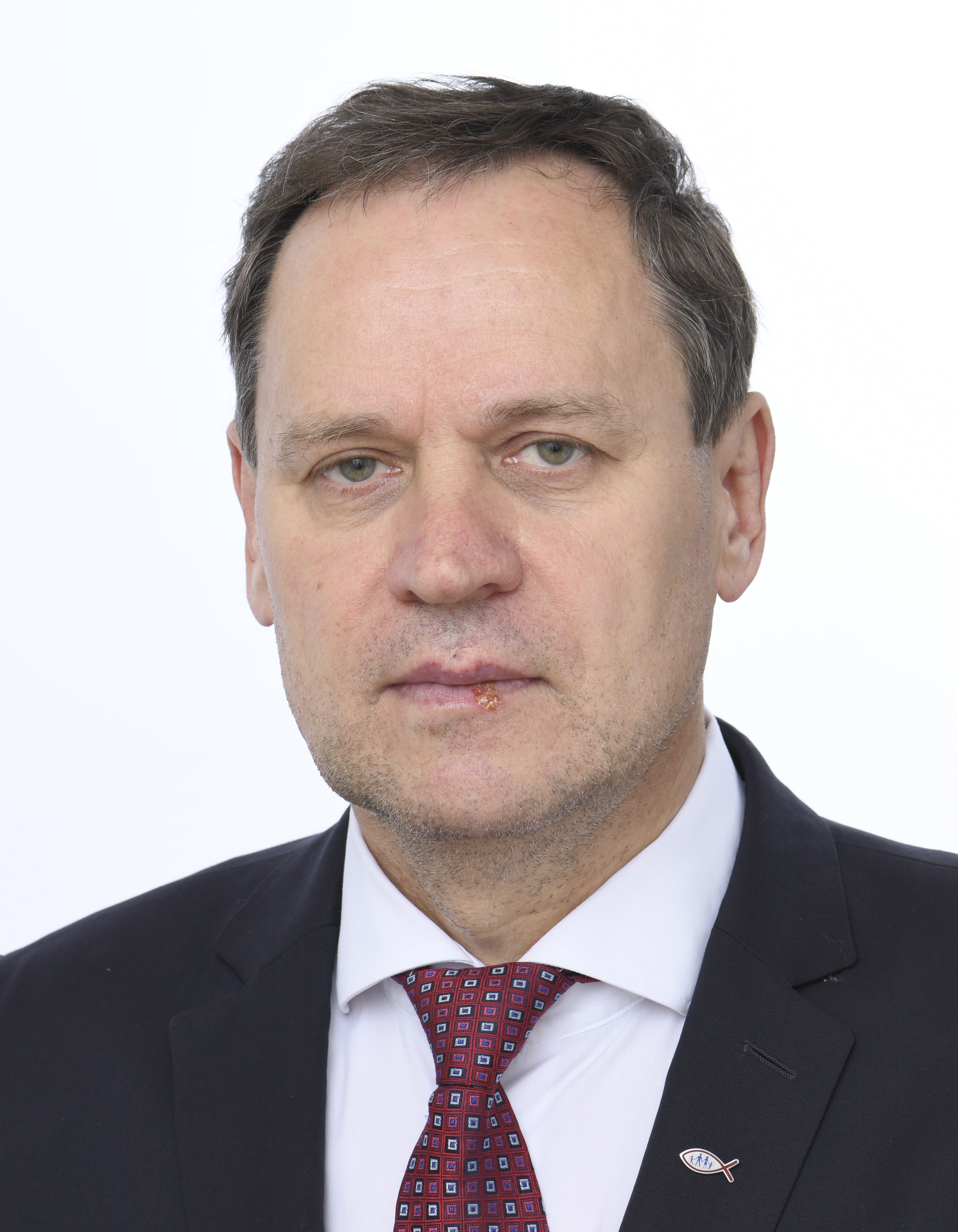

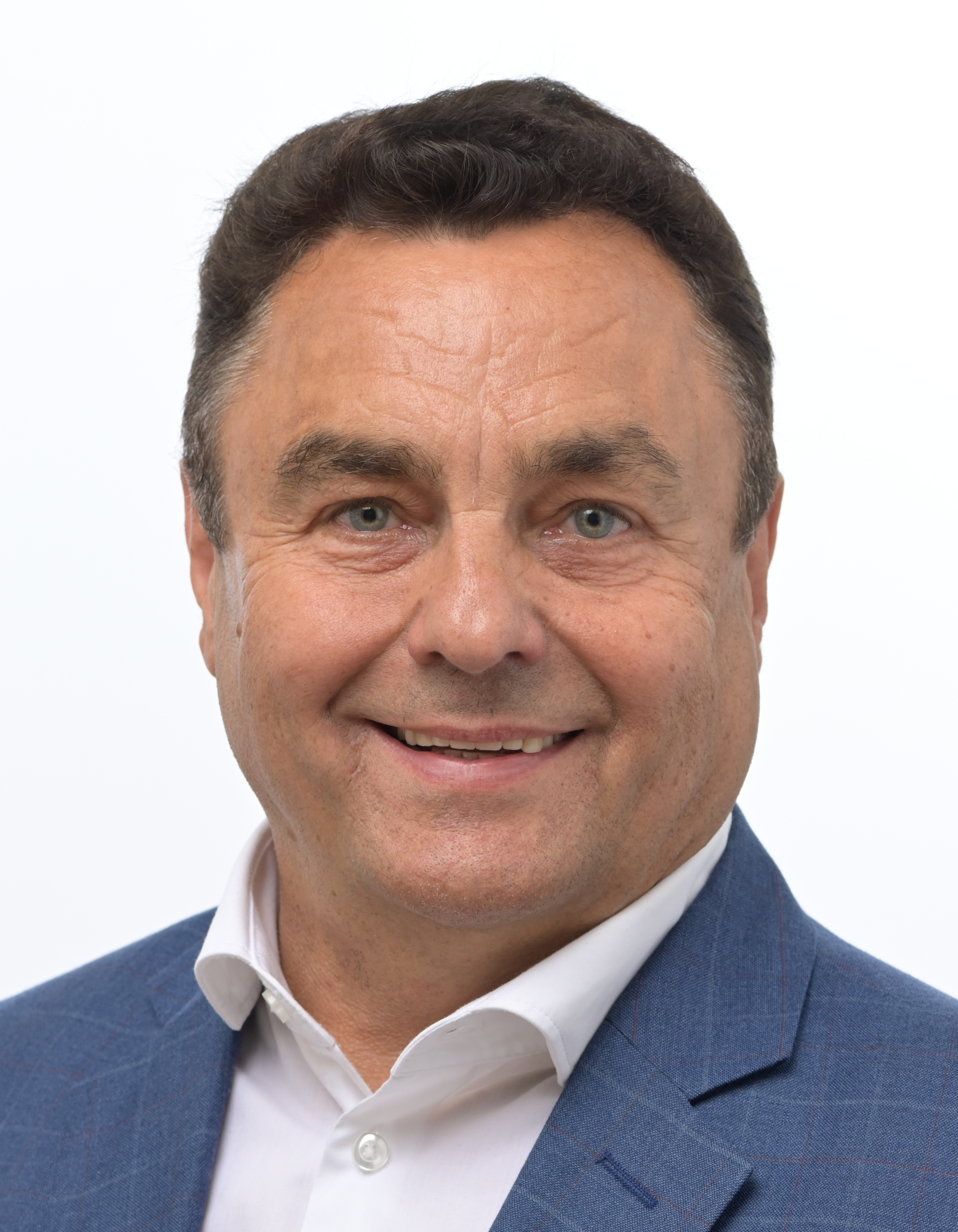

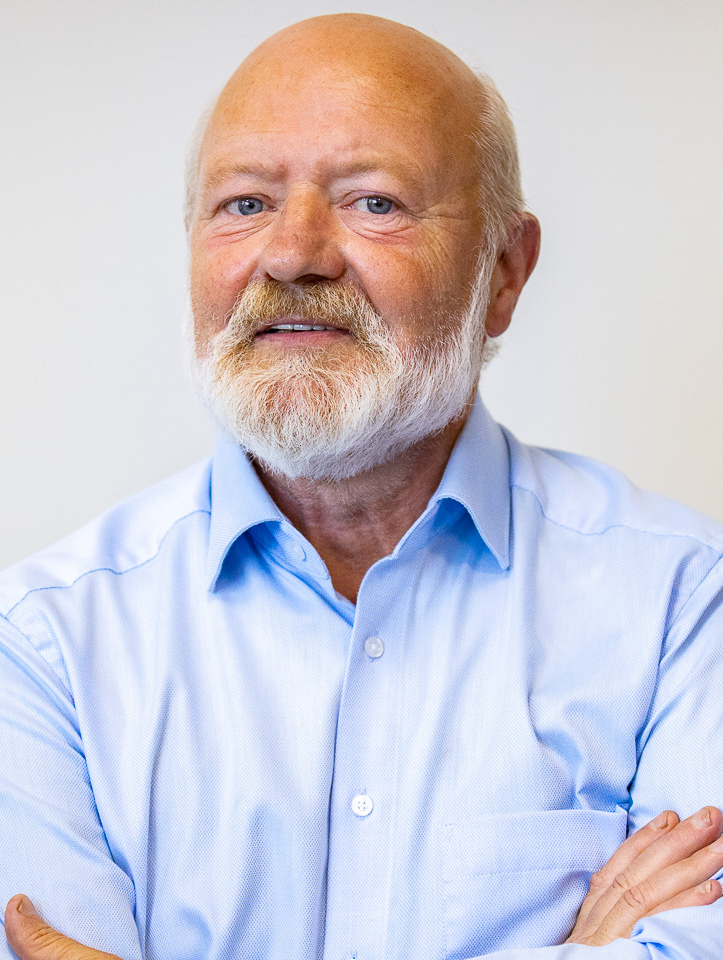
	First party	Second party	Third party
Leader	Andrius Kubilius	Vilija Blinkevičiūtė	Aurelijus Veryga
Party	TS–LKD	LSDP	LVŽS
Alliance	EPP	S&D	ECR
Last election	3 seats, 19.74%	2 seats, 15.88%	2 seats, 12.56%
Seats won	3	2	1
Seat change	▼1	Steady	Steady
Popular vote	144,689	121,929	61,907
Percentage	21.33%	17.98%	9.13%
Swing	▲1.59pp	▲2.1pp	▼3.43pp
	Fourth party	Fifth party	Sixth party
Leader	Dainius Žalimas	Virginijus Sinkevičius	Waldemar Tomaszewski
Party	LP	DSVL	LLRA–KŠS
Alliance	RE	Greens–EFA	ECR
Last election	New	New	1 seat, 5.5%
Seats won	1	1	1
Seat change	New	New	Steady
Popular vote	54,916	40,365	39,202
Percentage	8.1%	5.95%	5.78%
Swing	New	New	▲0.28pp
	Seventh party	Eighth party
Leader	Petras Gražulis	Eugenijus Gentvilas
Party	TTS	LS
Alliance	ESN	RE
Last election	0 seats, 5.13%	1 seat, 6.59%
Seats won	1	1
Seat change	▲1	Steady
Popular vote	36,958	36,739
Percentage	5.45%	5.42%
Swing	▲0.32pp	▼1.17pp
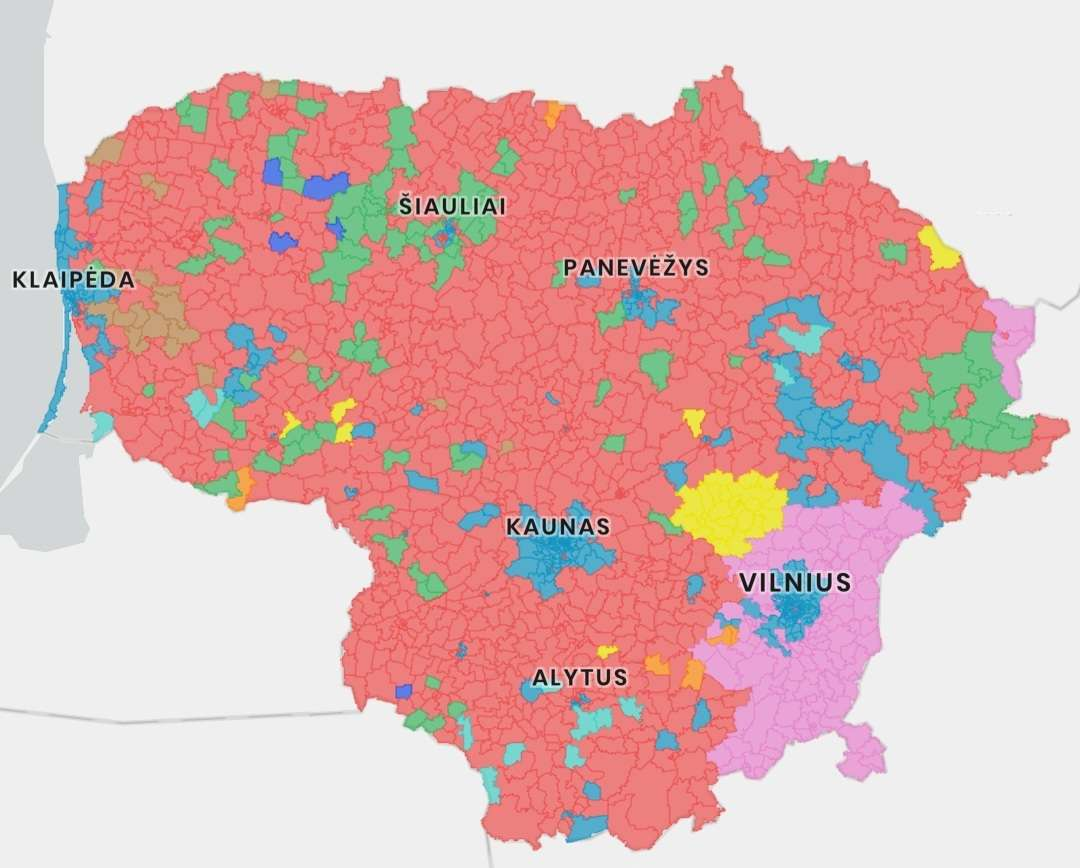

The 2024 European Parliament election in Lithuania were held on 9 June 2024 as part of the 2024 European Parliament election. This was the first to take place after Brexit.

== Background ==
Lithuania will elect 11 Members of the European Parliament.

Two out of the eleven incumbents opted not to seek reelection: Aušra Maldeikienė, of the TS-LKD, and Viktor Uspaskich from Labour, both citing personal reasons for their decision.

The remaining nine incumbents, however, sought another term. Among them Andrius Kubilius, Rasa Juknevičienė, Liudas Mažylis, all from TS-LKD, Vilija Blinkevičiūtė and Juozas Olekas, representing the LSDP, Petras Auštrevičius (LRLS), and Bronis Ropė (LVŽS) expressed their desire to continue serving in parliament.

Waldemar Tomaszewski, from the EAPL–CFA, had initially announced his retirement, but ran for reelection regardless. Stasys Jakeliūnas, an independent politician, previously associated with the LVŽS, was ostracized by the party due to his stance on the Russian invasion of Ukraine. Following this, Jakeliūnas switched party allegiances and ran on the LRP's list.

== Participating parties and coalitions ==
15 electoral lists were registered by the Central Election Commission on 7 May 2024. Two parties, the Lithuanian People's Party and the Lithuanian List, were unable to gather the required 10 thousand signatures, and one, Young Lithuania, withdrew from the race on their own accord. The order of the ballot was determined by lot on 26 April 2024.

Number	Party / Electoral list		Leader		Ideology	European affiliation	Current seats
Number	Party / Electoral list		Party	Electoral list	Ideology	European affiliation	Current seats
1	Freedom Party; Laisvės partija		Aušrinė Armonaitė	Dainius Žalimas	Liberalism	Alliance of Liberals and Democrats for Europe	0
2	Social Democratic Party of Lithuania; Lietuvos socialdemokratų partija		Vilija Blinkevičiūtė		Social democracy	Party of European Socialists	2
3	Labour Party; Darbo partija		Andrius Mazuronis	Valentinas Bukauskas	Populism	Non-Inscrits	1
4	Lithuanian Regions Party; Lietuvos regionų partija		Jonas Pinskus	Živilė Pinskuvienė	Regionalism	none	1
5	Lithuanian Farmers and Greens Union; Lietuvos valstiečių ir žaliųjų sąjunga		Ramūnas Karbauskis	Aurelijus Veryga	Agrarianism; Social conservatism	none (Greens/EFA group)	1
6	Electoral Action of Poles in Lithuania – Christian Families Alliance; Lietuvos lenkų rinkimų akcija – Krikščioniškų šeimų sąjunga		Waldemar Tomaszewski		Polish interests Social conservatism	European Conservatives and Reformists	1
7	Lithuanian Green Party; Lietuvos žaliųjų partija		Ieva Budraitė		Green liberalism	none	0
8	People and Justice Union (centrists, nationalists); Tautos ir teisingumo sąjunga (centristai, tautininkai)		Petras Gražulis		National conservatism Euroscepticism	none	0
9	Liberals' Movement; Liberalų sąjūdis		Viktorija Čmilytė-Nielsen	Eugenijus Gentvilas	Classical liberalism	Alliance of Liberals and Democrats for Europe	1
10	Coalition of Peace; Taikos koalicija	Lithuanian Christian Democracy Party	Mindaugas Puidokas	Mindaugas Puidokas	Christian right	none	0
10	Coalition of Peace; Taikos koalicija	Samogitian Party	Stasys Gvažiauskas	Mindaugas Puidokas	Regionalism	none	0
11	Freedom and Justice; Laisvė ir teisingumas		Artūras Zuokas	Artūras Paulauskas	Conservative liberalism	none	0
12	Christian Union; Krikščionių sąjunga		Rimantas Dagys	Algimantas Rusteika	Christian right	none	0
13	Union of Democrats "For Lithuania"; Demokratų sąjunga "Vardan Lietuvos"		Saulius Skvernelis	Virginijus Sinkevičius	Green conservatism	European Green Party	0
14	Homeland Union – Lithuanian Christian Democrats; Tėvynės sąjunga – Lietuvos krikščionys demokratai		Gabrielius Landsbergis	Andrius Kubilius	Liberal conservatism Christian democracy	European People's Party	4
15	National Alliance; Nacionalinis susivienijimas		Vytautas Radžvilas		National conservatism Euroscepticism	none	0

== Opinion polling ==
Parliamentary election poll results are listed in the table below in reverse chronological order. The highest percentage figure in each poll is displayed in bold, and its background is shaded in the leading party's colour. The "Lead" column shows the percentage point difference between the two parties with the highest figures.

Pollster	Fieldwork dates	Sample size	TS–LKD EPP	LVŽS G/EFA	DP NI	LSDP S&D	LP Renew	LRLS Renew	LRP	PLT	DSVL G/EFA	Others (Note: Parties which received less than 1% of the vote.)	Lead
Baltijos tyrimai	10-21 April 2024	1,020	14.3; 2	11.6; 1	8.9; 1	**27.1**; 3	4.1; 0	6.6; 1	5.1; 1	2.7; 0	13.3; 2	6.5 (Note: Coalition of Peace 1.5%, Lithuanian Green Party 1.4%, National Alliance 1.4%, People and Justice Union 0.9%, Electoral Action of Poles in Lithuania 0.7%, Christian Union 0.2%, Lithuanian People's Party 0.2%, Lithuanian List 0.2%); 0	**12.8**
2020 Lithuanian parliamentary election		1,133,561	25.77 (4)	18.07 (3)	9.77 (1)	9.58 (1)	9.45 (1)	7.04 (1)	3.28 (0)	2.06 (0)	–	9.22 (0)	7.70
2019 European Parliament election		1,259,954	19.74 3	12.56 2	8.99 1	15.88 2	–	6.59 1	2.36 0	1.92 0	–	31.96 2	3.86

== Results ==
Once the officials confirmed the results from Lithuania, it became clear that the Homeland Union maintained its status for the next term. It gained three seats, which is the same results as in 2019. It was fourth consecutive election to the European Parliament when Homeland Union won plurarity of the votes. The party is a member of the European People's Party.

In second place emerged the Social Democratic Party with two seats. The results remained stable. It is a member of the European Socialists. In third place finished the union of Farmers and Greens with a single mandate, a decrease by one from 2019. The party has been a member of the Greens/European Free Alliance since 2014 but connected with the European Conservatives and Reformists (ECR) this time.

The newly founded Freedom Party is following the list with one delegate. Formerly, it was part of the Liberals' Movement, which also gained a mandate. Both of the parties belong to ALDE, marking an increase in liberals from the country from 1 to 2 delegates in total.

The Union of Democrats and the Electoral Action of Poles got one mandate each as well. The first one is a member of the European Green Party, while the other later one is a member of the ECR. The People and Justice Union got a single delegate, however, as of 10 June 2024, the party co-founded Europe of Sovereign Nations.

Party	Votes	%	Seats	+/–
Homeland Union – Lithuanian Christian Democrats	144,689	21.33	3	0
Social Democratic Party of Lithuania	121,929	17.98	2	0
Lithuanian Farmers and Greens Union	61,907	9.13	1	-1
Freedom Party	54,916	8.10	1	New
Union of Democrats "For Lithuania"	40,365	5.95	1	New
Electoral Action of Poles in Lithuania	39,202	5.78	1	0
People and Justice Union	36,958	5.45	1	+1
Liberals' Movement	36,739	5.42	1	0
Lithuanian Regions Party	35,614	5.25	0	0
Lithuanian Green Party	27,491	4.05	0	0
National Alliance	25,726	3.79	0	0
Coalition of Peace (LKDP–ŽP)	23,777	3.51	0	New
Labour Party	11,238	1.66	0	-1
Christian Union	9,310	1.37	0	New
Freedom and Justice	8,458	1.25	0	0
Total	678,319	100.00	11	0
Valid votes	678,319	98.08		
Invalid/blank votes	13,253	1.92		
Total votes	691,572	100.00		
Registered voters/turnout	2,387,327	28.97		
Source: VRK

=== European groups ===
Party	Seats	+/–
European People's Party Group	3	-1
Progressive Alliance of Socialists and Democrats	2	0
European Conservatives and Reformists Group	2	+1
Renew Europe	2	+1
Greens–European Free Alliance	1	-1
Europe of Sovereign Nations Group	1	New
Total	11	0

=== By municipality ===
Breakdown of votes by municipality for parties with at least 5% of the total votes.

Results by municipality
Municipality	TS-LKD		LSDP		LVŽS		LP		DSVL		LLRA-KŠS		TTS		LS		LRP	
Municipality	Votes	%	Votes	%	Votes	%	Votes	%	Votes	%	Votes	%	Votes	%	Votes	%	Votes	%
Akmenė	424	9.71	1705	39.03	824	18.86	126	2.88	148	3.39	12	0.27	313	7.17	161	3.69	171	3.91
Alytus (city)	2031	20.21	2507	24.95	917	9.13	548	5.45	755	7.51	34	0.34	834	8.30	503	5.01	535	5.32
Alytus (district)	983	15.75	1452	23.27	651	10.43	267	4.28	916	14.68	11	0.18	624	10.00	195	3.13	311	4.98
Anykščiai	1164	19.25	1479	24.45	784	12.96	301	4.98	537	8.88	22	0.36	302	4.99	301	4.98	361	5.97
Birštonas	259	17.34	460	30.79	108	7.23	102	6.83	57	3.82	5	0.33	66	4.42	70	4.69	134	8.97
Biržai	881	15.31	1750	30.42	770	13.38	209	3.63	358	6.22	17	0.30	393	6.83	201	3.49	308	5.35
Druskininkai	1135	22.48	1143	22.64	393	7.78	257	5.09	502	9.94	54	1.07	325	6.44	175	3.47	303	6.00
Elektrėnai	813	17.43	1017	21.80	365	7.82	259	5.55	426	9.13	74	1.59	315	6.75	432	9.26	319	6.84
Ignalina	516	12.76	871	21.54	1025	25.35	185	4.57	188	4.65	105	2.60	277	6.85	152	3.76	137	3.39
Jonava	1127	15.12	2446	32.82	824	11.06	365	4.90	453	6.08	70	0.94	341	4.58	294	3.94	400	5.37
Joniškis	487	9.84	1662	33.58	699	14.12	168	3.39	178	3.60	14	0.28	327	6.61	579	11.70	223	4.51
Jurbarkas	886	16.59	1376	25.76	591	11.07	222	4.16	343	6.42	13	0.24	417	7.81	272	5.09	525	9.83
Kaišiadorys	1051	16.13	1521	23.34	691	10.60	392	6.02	314	4.82	22	0.34	490	7.52	508	7.80	552	8.47
Kalvarija	229	12.41	517	28.01	261	14.14	67	3.63	117	6.34	5	0.27	199	10.78	64	3.47	70	3.79
Kaunas (city)	19401	28.02	9912	14.32	6809	9.83	5162	7.46	4557	6.58	294	0.42	3350	4.84	4088	5.90	2494	3.60
Kaunas (district)	6062	26.07	4885	21.01	2042	8.78	1680	7.23	1346	5.79	47	0.20	943	4.06	1285	5.53	999	4.30
Kazlų Rūda	388	16.73	597	25.74	256	11.04	113	4.87	144	6.21	8	0.34	181	7.81	104	4.48	117	5.05
Kelmė	569	10.82	1578	30.02	1010	19.21	182	3.46	230	4.38	39	0.74	476	9.05	159	3.02	379	7.21
Kėdainiai	1367	13.39	2689	26.34	1182	11.58	464	4.54	601	5.89	39	0.38	844	8.27	505	4.95	680	6.66
Klaipėda (city)	5789	20.70	3667	13.11	2888	10.33	1737	6.21	1545	5.52	1979	7.08	1685	6.02	2419	8.65	1411	5.04
Klaipėda (district)	2502	18.45	2159	15.92	1604	11.83	834	6.15	774	5.71	133	0.98	1857	13.70	989	7.29	671	4.95
Kretinga	1334	16.79	1881	23.67	962	12.11	353	4.44	490	6.17	17	0.21	793	9.98	336	4.23	433	5.45
Kupiškis	604	15.30	1173	29.72	679	17.20	125	3.17	202	5.12	9	0.23	302	7.65	152	3.85	237	6.00
Lazdijai	674	14.12	1256	26.30	414	8.67	206	4.31	728	15.25	17	0.36	457	9.57	151	3.16	324	6.79
Marijampolė	1830	17.02	2673	24.87	1476	13.73	423	3.93	899	8.36	16	0.15	704	6.55	308	2.87	571	5.31
Mažeikiai	1233	12.53	2369	24.08	1532	15.57	429	4.36	673	6.84	45	0.46	882	8.97	303	3.08	939	9.54
Molėtai	1037	21.94	1067	22.58	314	6.64	323	6.83	225	4.76	28	0.59	241	5.10	210	4.44	456	9.65
Neringa	597	30.88	179	9.26	76	3.93	242	12.52	168	8.69	6	0.31	59	3.05	233	12.05	41	2.12
Pagėgiai	148	9.31	471	29.64	224	14.10	46	2.89	90	5.66	4	0.25	140	8.81	171	10.76	127	7.99
Pakruojis	470	10.33	1881	41.36	546	12.01	124	2.73	162	3.56	13	0.29	282	6.20	190	4.18	364	8.00
Palanga	1851	30.24	782	12.77	603	9.85	404	6.60	354	5.78	45	0.74	330	5.39	345	5.64	283	4.62
Panevėžys (city)	4392	24.23	3713	20.48	1855	10.23	1005	5.54	1305	7.20	40	0.22	960	5.30	1054	5.81	1167	6.44
Panevėžys (district)	1543	19.03	1960	24.17	1138	14.03	379	4.67	566	6.98	27	0.33	530	6.54	345	4.25	522	6.44
Pasvalys	936	16.65	1705	30.33	561	9.98	203	3.61	408	7.26	27	0.48	465	8.27	127	2.26	419	7.45
Plungė	958	14.57	1554	23.63	980	14.90	274	4.17	379	5.76	13	0.20	629	9.57	383	5.82	319	4.85
Prienai	879	15.13	2009	34.58	534	9.19	225	3.87	287	4.94	22	0.38	404	6.95	163	2.81	495	8.52
Radviliškis	895	12.57	2094	29.41	946	13.29	244	3.43	412	5.79	25	0.35	525	7.37	282	3.96	552	7.75
Raseiniai	973	14.13	2060	29.91	930	13.50	217	3.15	285	4.14	20	0.29	636	9.23	175	2.54	583	8.47
Rietavas	218	13.32	461	28.16	170	10.38	55	3.36	113	6.90	5	0.31	167	10.20	105	6.41	113	6.90
Rokiškis	1103	16.73	2123	32.20	708	10.74	273	4.14	357	5.41	23	0.35	440	6.67	250	3.79	393	5.96
Skuodas	425	13.19	806	25.02	465	14.43	98	3.04	203	6.30	7	0.22	403	12.51	110	3.41	255	7.91
Šakiai	1101	17.77	1690	27.28	1103	17.80	226	3.65	288	4.65	14	0.23	505	8.15	168	2.71	288	4.65
Šalčininkai	148	1.35	384	3.51	116	1.06	148	1.35	103	0.94	9276	84.71	133	1.21	55	0.50	143	1.31
Šiauliai (city)	3596	17.66	3847	18.89	3232	15.87	1183	5.81	1561	7.67	73	0.36	1346	6.61	1133	5.56	1309	6.43
Šiauliai (district)	1096	12.91	1795	21.15	2112	24.88	366	4.31	518	6.10	15	0.18	517	6.09	346	4.08	530	6.24
Šilalė	1021	22.01	1092	23.54	528	11.38	161	3.47	257	5.54	13	0.28	677	14.59	139	3.00	232	5.00
Šilutė	1188	15.59	1929	25.31	890	11.68	299	3.92	855	11.22	30	0.39	611	8.02	283	3.71	528	6.93
Širvintos	547	11.52	477	10.04	257	5.41	203	4.27	197	4.15	155	3.26	181	3.81	100	2.11	2201	46.34
Švenčionys	562	11.20	993	19.78	416	8.29	229	4.56	195	3.88	789	15.72	298	5.94	143	2.85	271	5.40
Tauragė	1163	16.17	1784	24.80	1105	15.36	293	4.07	308	4.28	17	0.24	577	8.02	584	8.12	552	7.67
Telšiai	1019	12.85	1704	21.50	1075	13.56	323	4.07	500	6.31	26	0.33	561	7.08	242	3.05	608	7.67
Trakai	1117	14.04	1171	14.72	442	5.56	497	6.25	385	4.84	1542	19.39	325	4.09	1101	13.84	304	3.82
Ukmergė	1275	16.25	1597	20.35	781	9.95	355	4.52	668	8.51	35	0.45	541	6.89	233	2.97	1227	15.64
Utena	1785	20.53	2175	25.01	678	7.80	467	5.37	656	7.54	24	0.28	689	7.92	368	4.23	617	7.10
Varėna	1052	18.96	1450	26.14	306	5.52	324	5.84	471	8.49	56	1.01	498	8.98	328	5.91	259	4.67
Vilkaviškis	857	11.91	2642	36.73	737	10.24	255	3.54	415	5.77	58	0.81	613	8.52	212	2.95	423	5.88
Vilnius (city)	44032	30.36	12998	8.96	5582	3.85	22484	15.50	7715	5.32	10820	7.46	3125	2.15	9067	6.25	3821	2.63
Vilnius (district)	4532	15.64	2646	9.13	806	2.78	2023	6.98	1052	3.63	11987	41.38	558	1.93	1220	4.21	999	3.45
Visaginas	146	6.13	329	13.81	415	17.42	105	4.41	101	4.24	534	22.42	88	3.69	159	6.68	101	4.24
Zarasai	568	15.53	939	25.67	373	10.20	177	4.84	176	4.81	138	3.77	227	6.21	190	5.19	363	9.92
Diaspora	7720	29.27	2677	10.15	1146	4.34	5510	20.89	1149	4.36	194	0.74	980	3.72	1819	6.90	1145	4.34

=== Preference votes ===
Alongside votes for a party, voters were able to cast a preferential votes for a candidate on the party list. The table shows the ten candidates with the most votes.

Party	Pos.	Candidate	Votes
TS–LKD	1	Andrius Kubilius	81,465
TS–LKD	2	Rasa Juknevičienė	70,306
LSDP	1	Vilija Blinkevičiūtė	59,695
TS–LKD	3	Paulius Saudargas	56,477
TS–LKD	4	Liudas Mažylis	48,979
TS–LKD	5	Radvilė Morkūnaitė-Mikulėnienė	47,131
LSDP	4	Vytenis Povilas Andriukaitis	45,695
LSDP	2	Juozas Olekas	43,861
LP	1	Dainius Žalimas	36,283
TS–LKD	8	Arvydas Anušauskas	34,970

== Elected MEPs ==
Elected MEPs
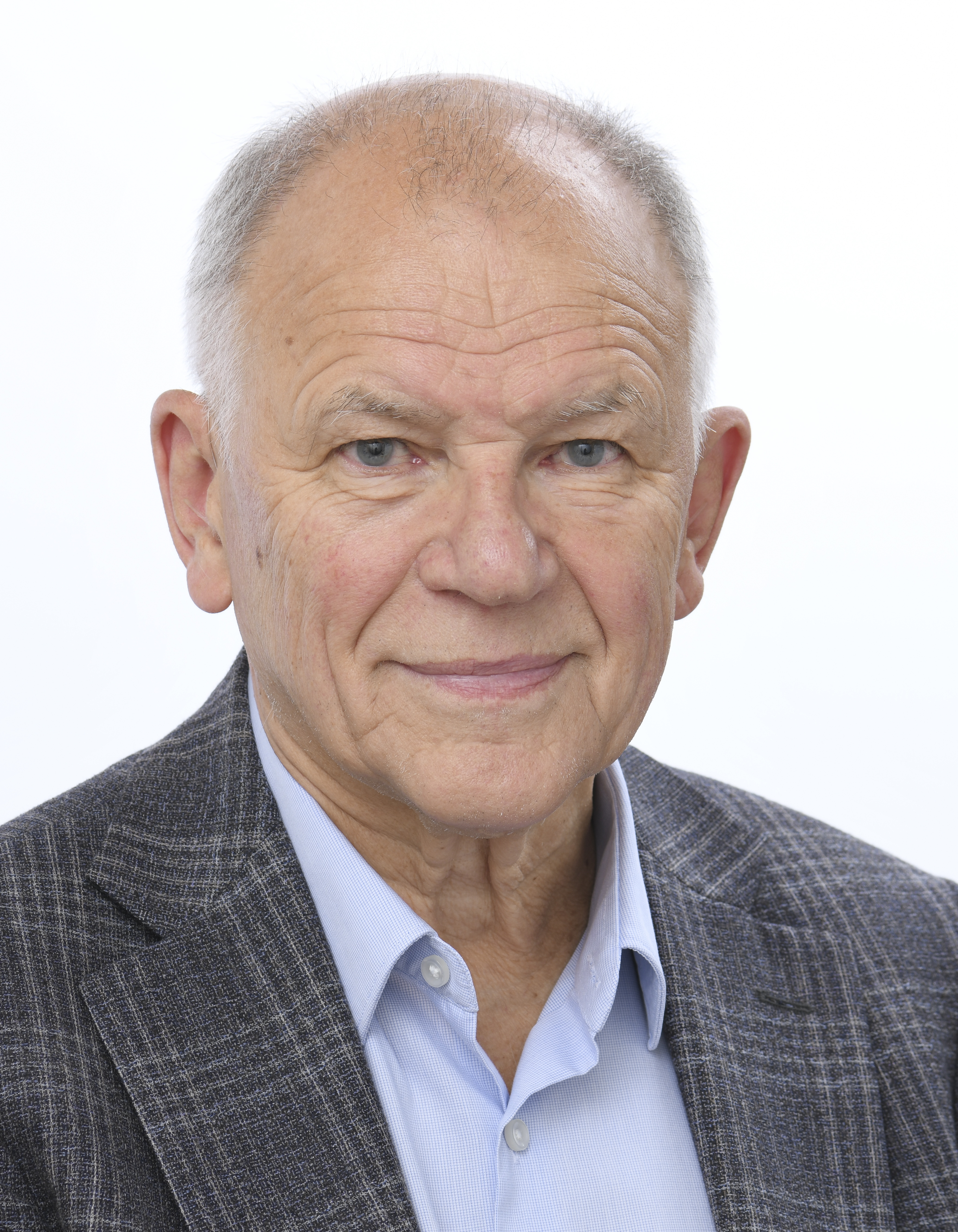
Vytenis Povilas Andriukaitis (LSDP)

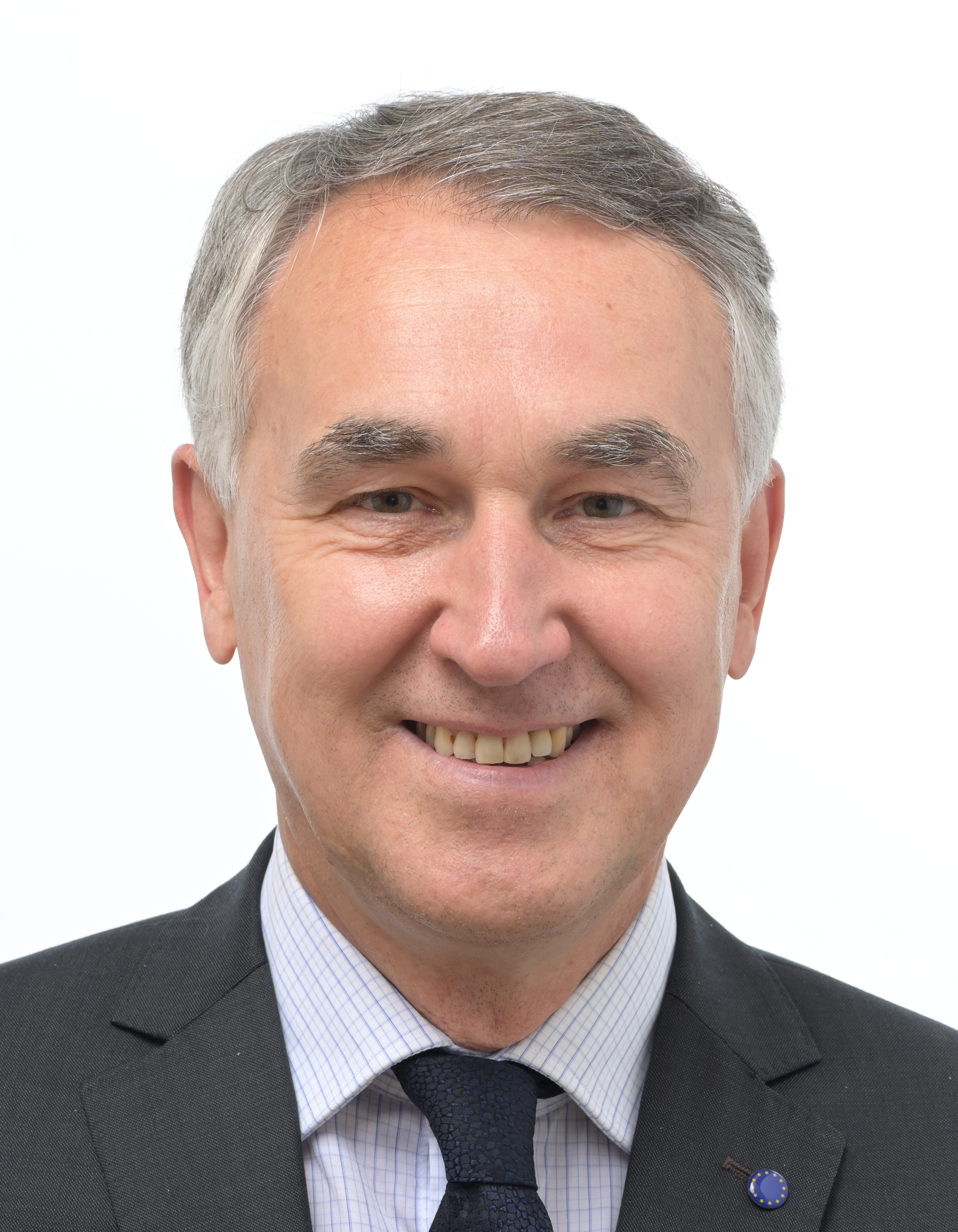
Petras Auštrevičius (LS)

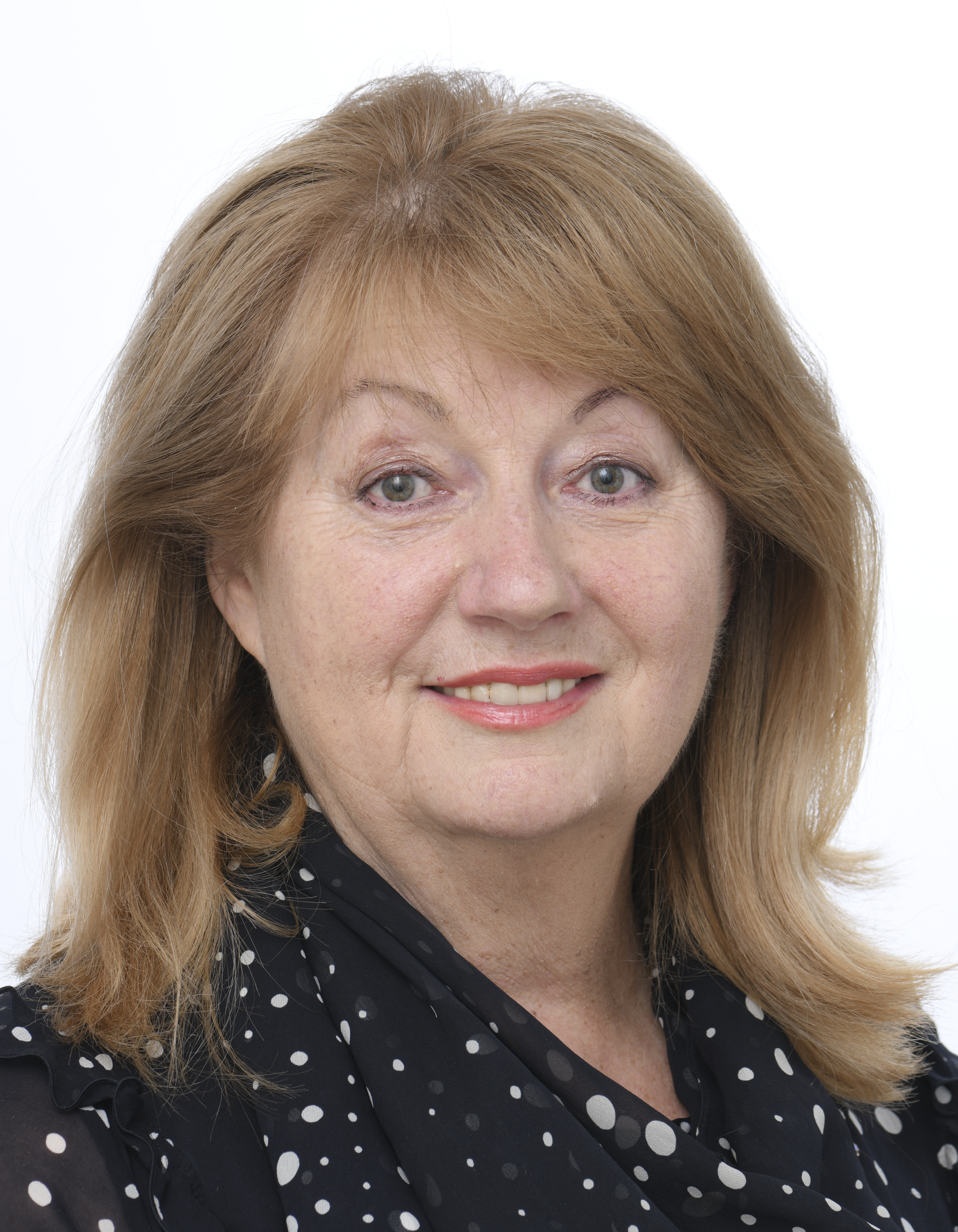
Vilija Blinkevičiūtė (LSDP)

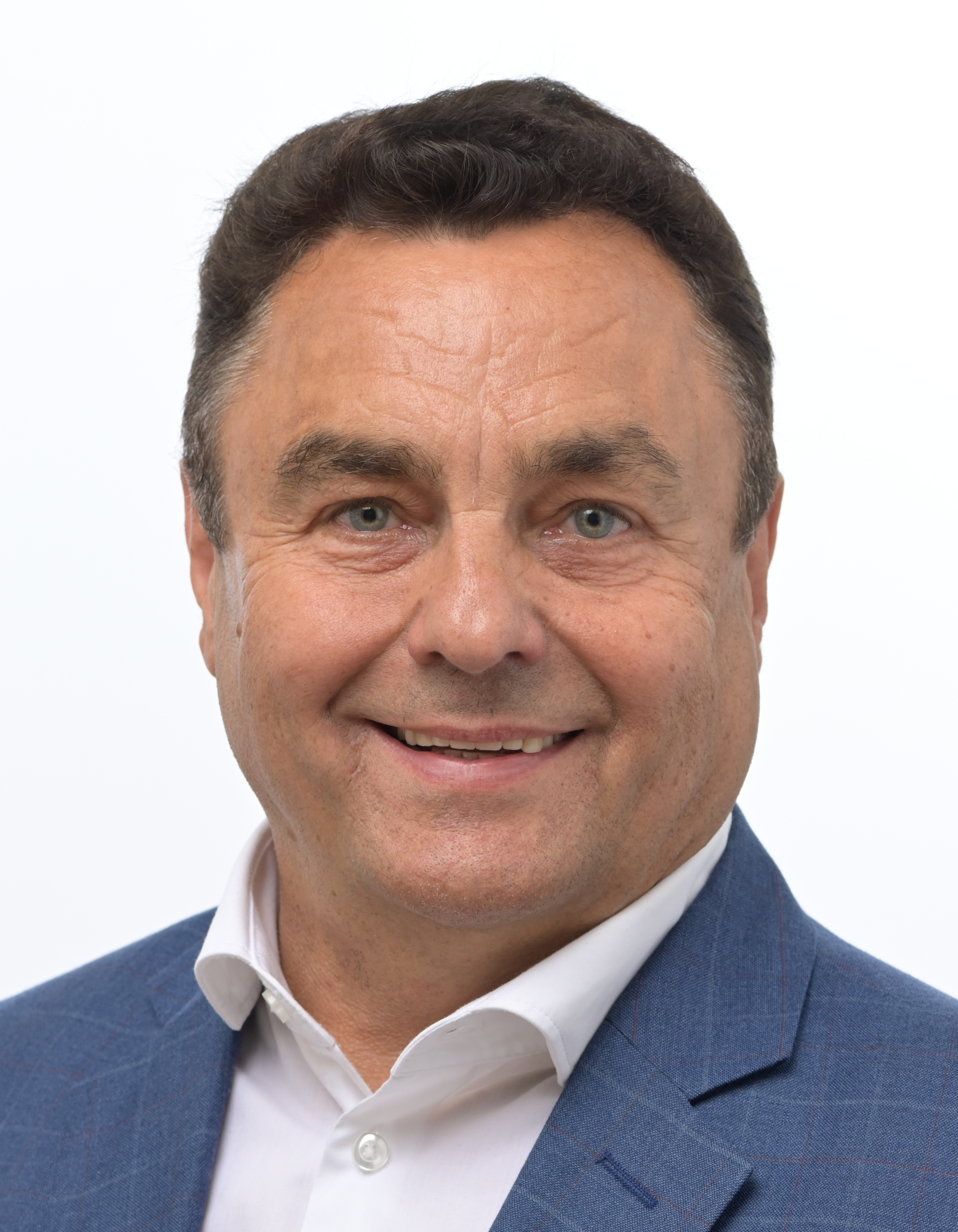
Petras Gražulis (TTS)

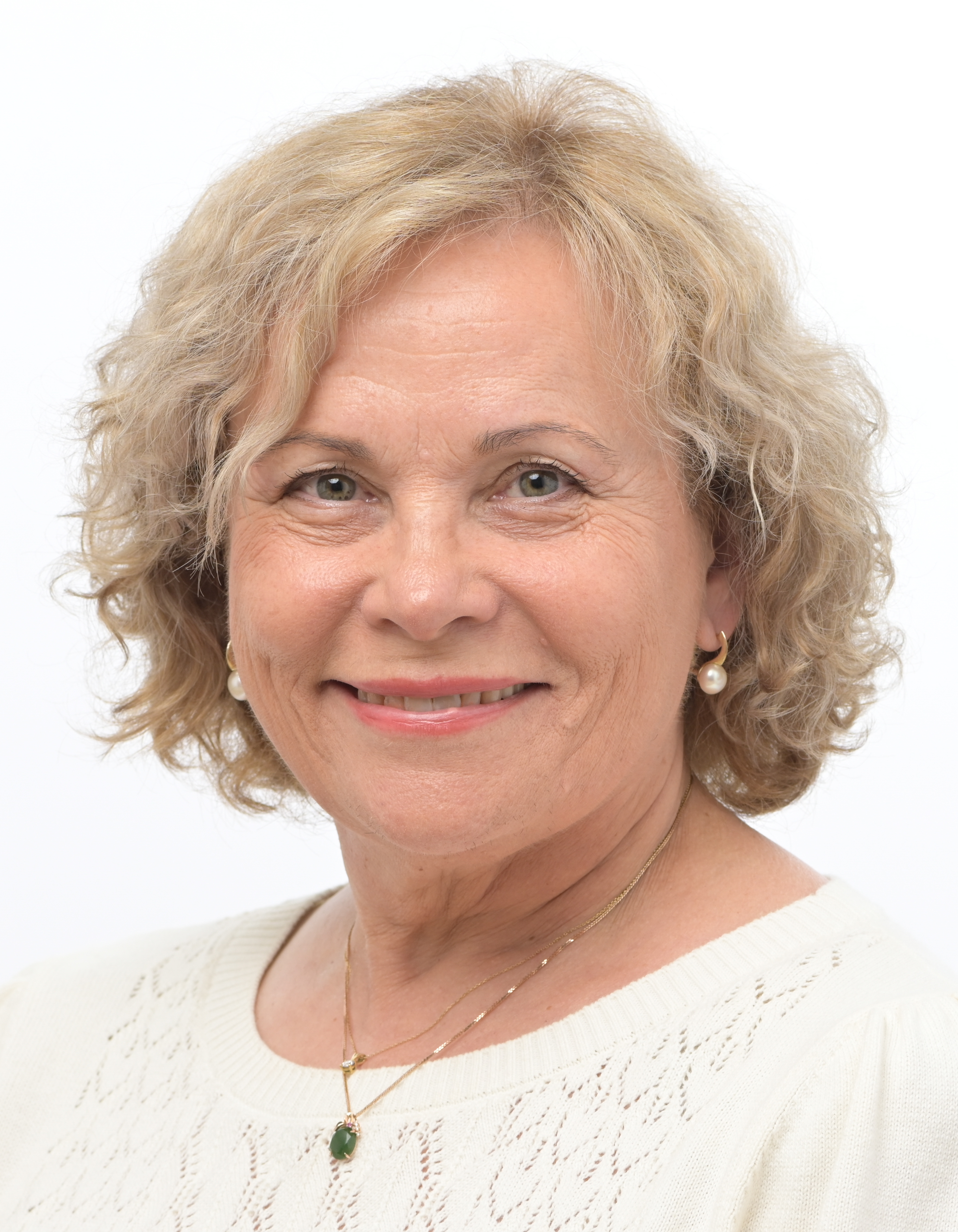
Rasa Juknevičienė (TS-LKD)

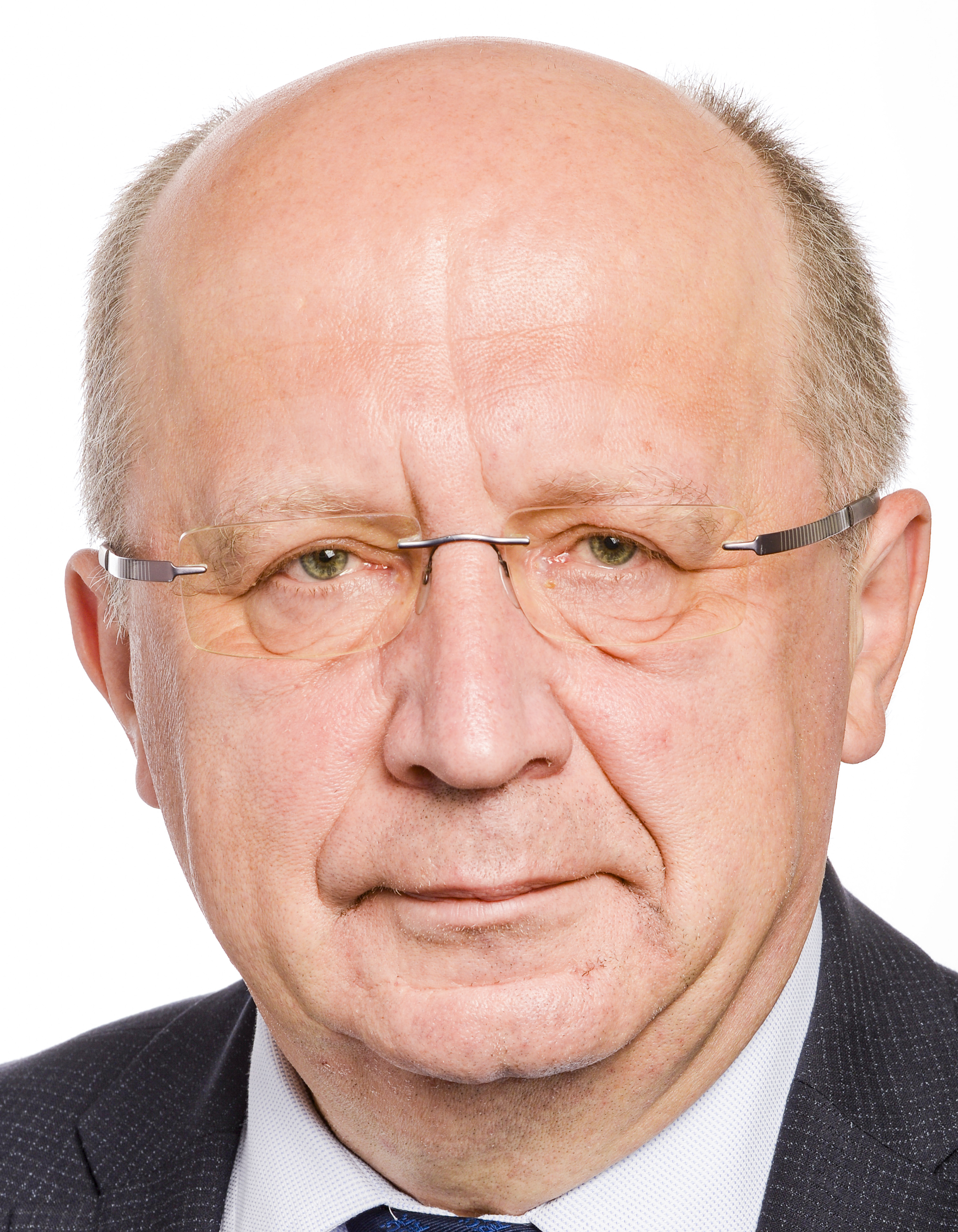
Andrius Kubilius (TS-LKD)

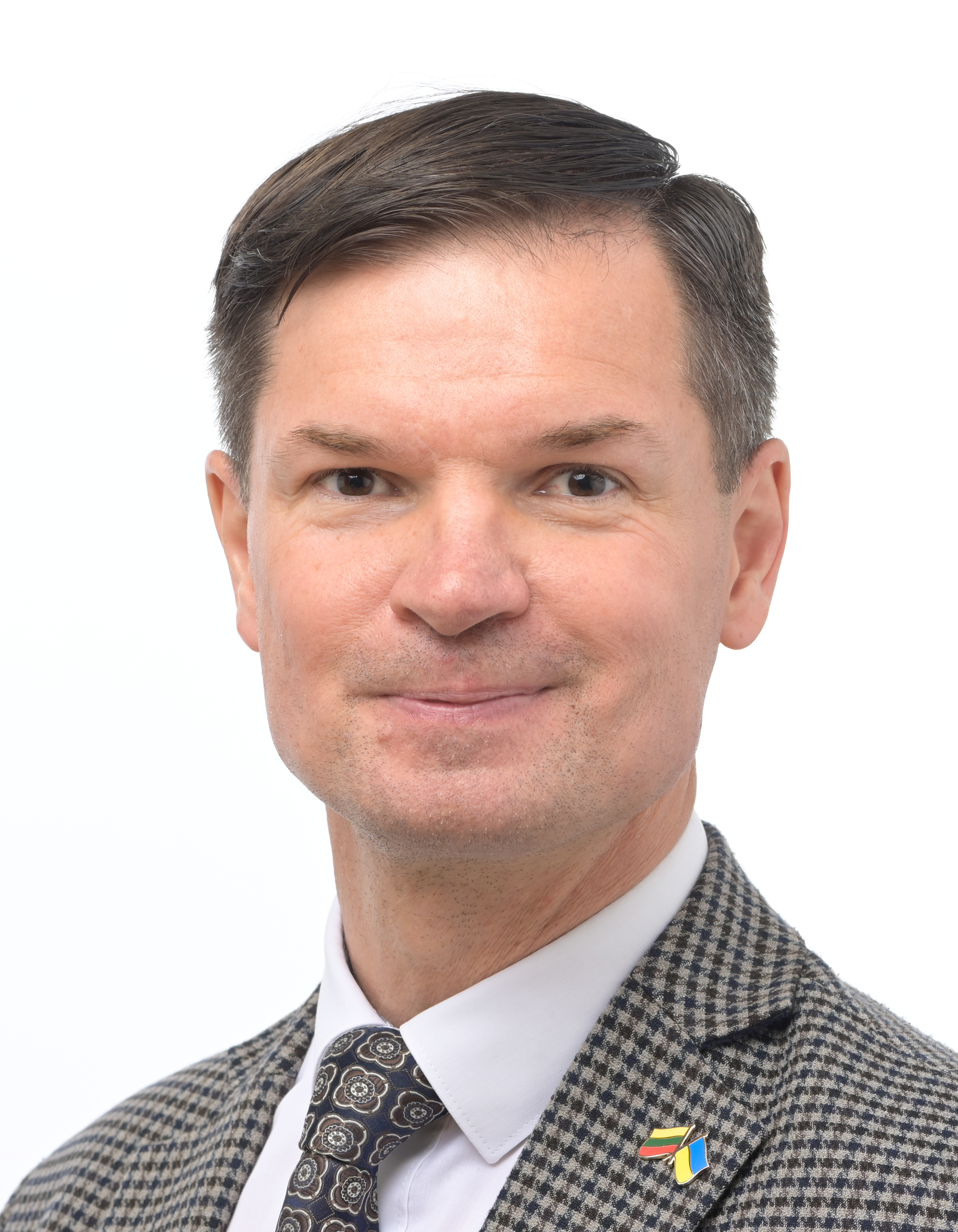
Paulius Saudargas (TS-LKD)

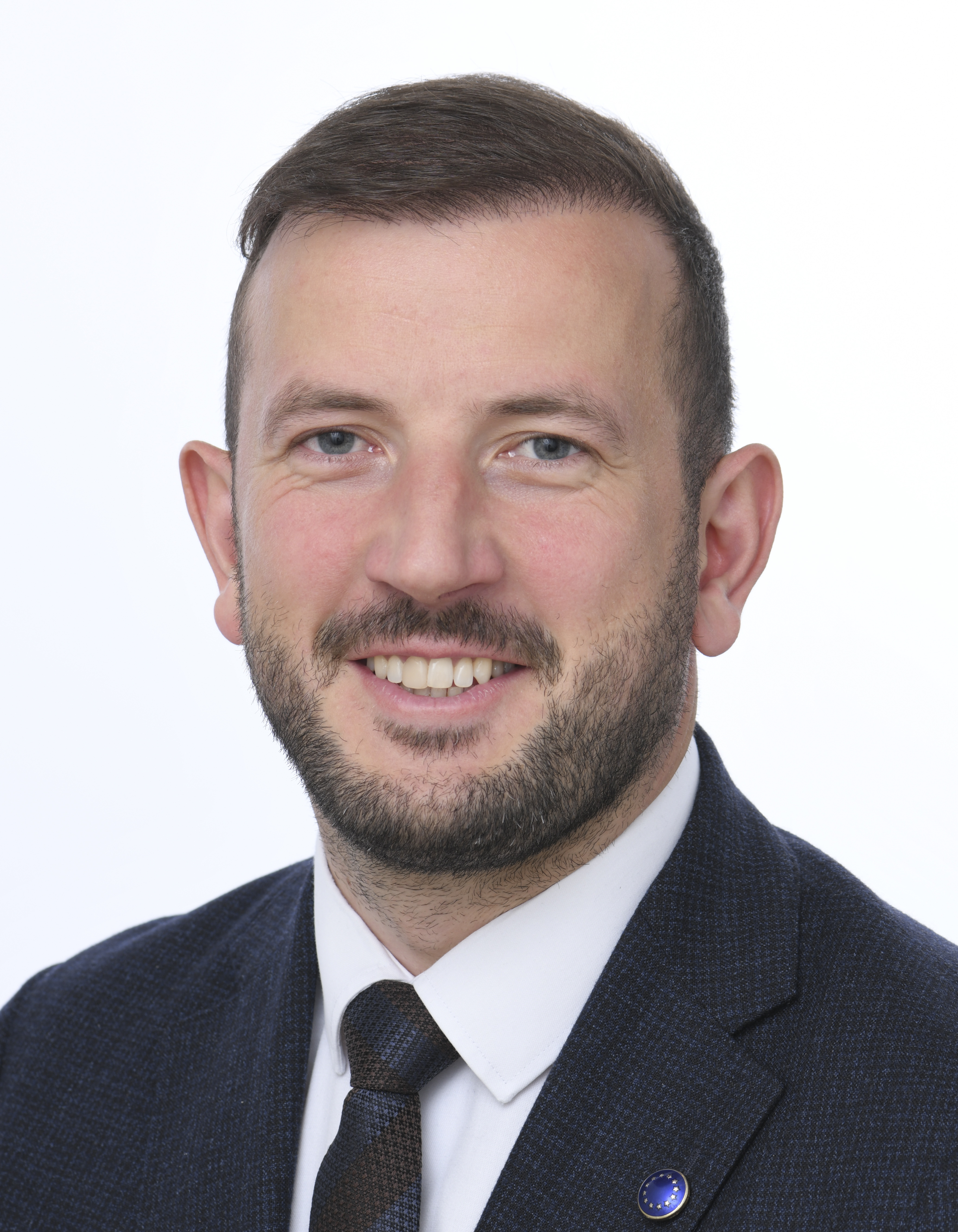
Virginijus Sinkevičius (DSVL)

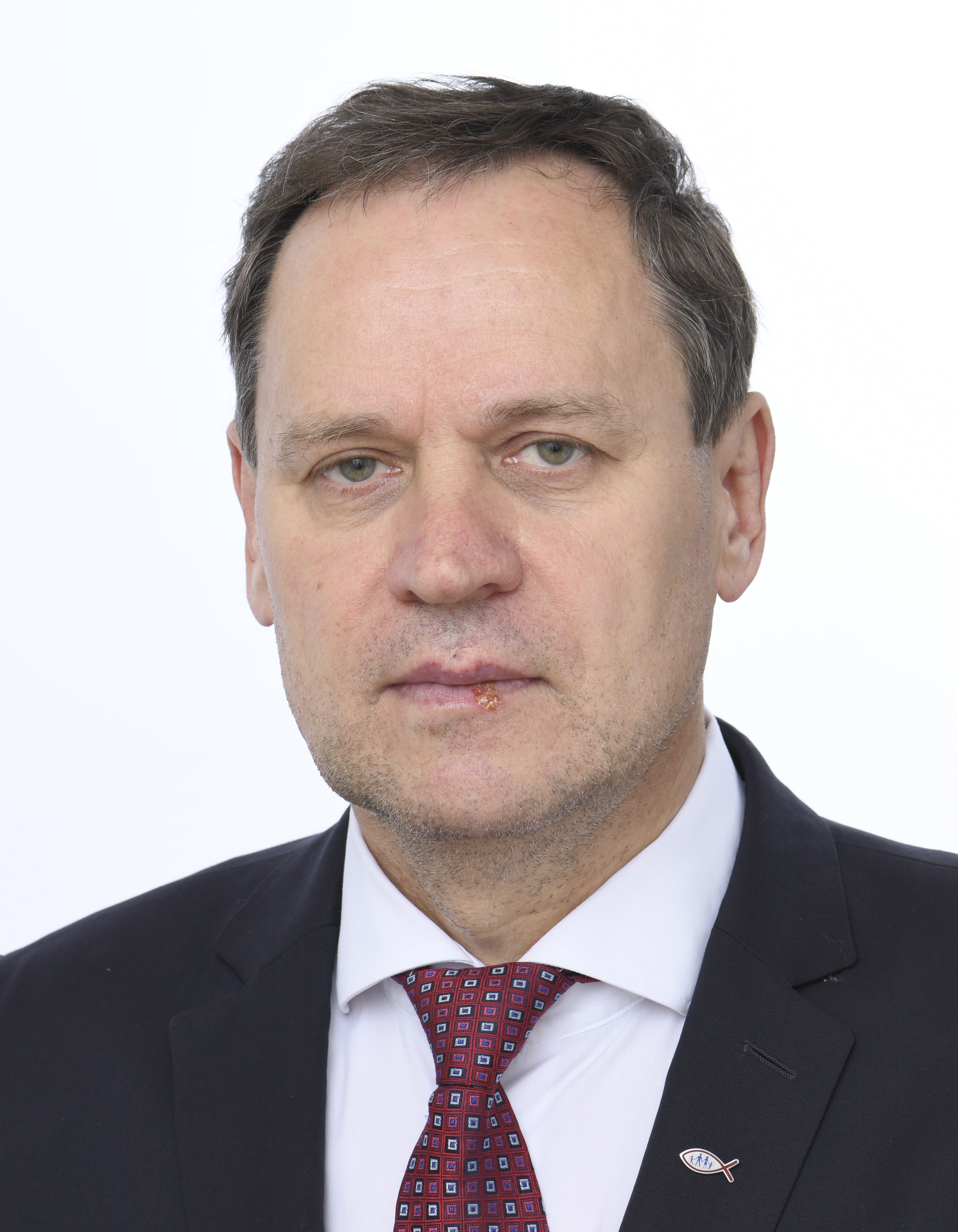
Waldemar Tomaszewski (LLRA-KŠS)

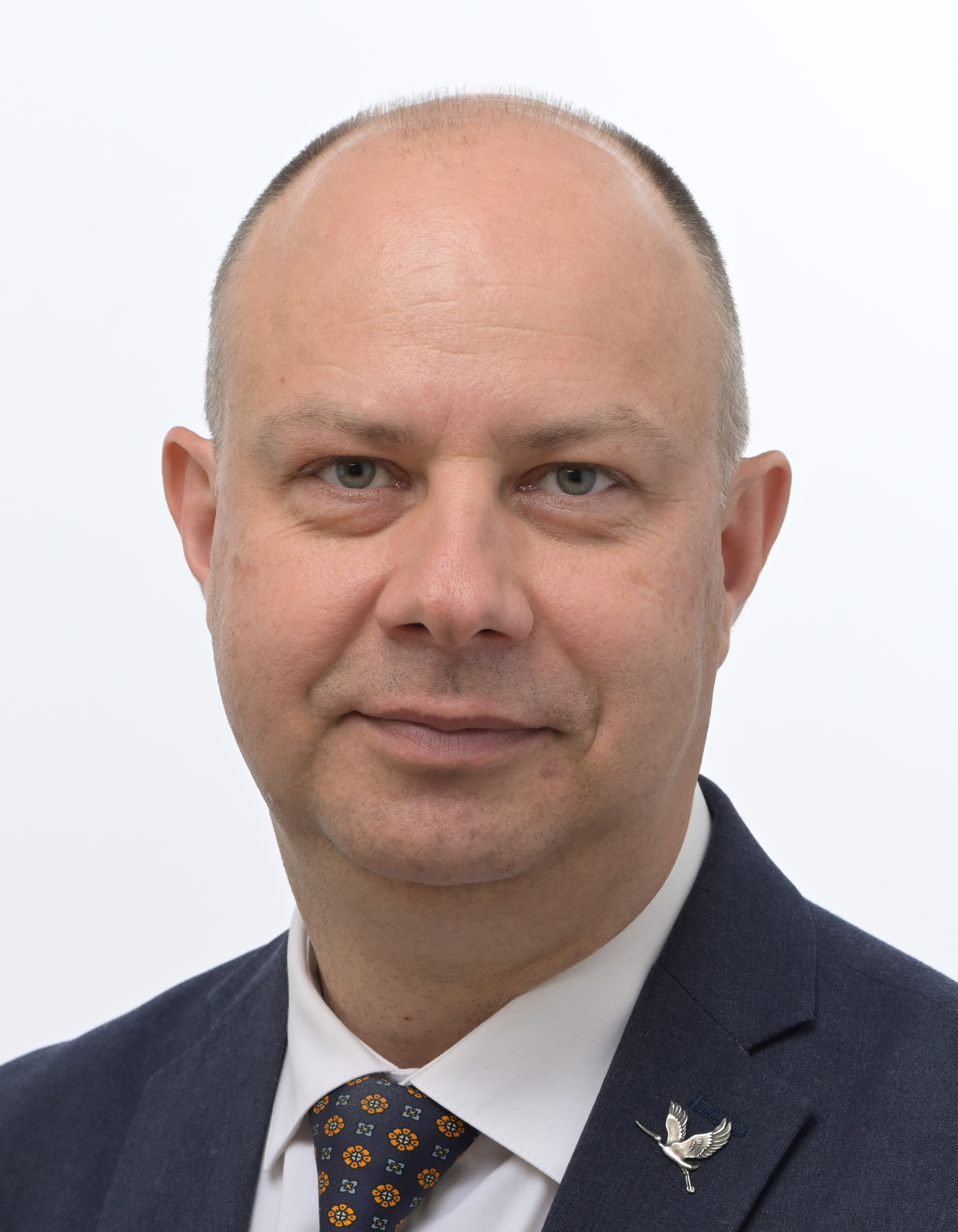
Aurelijus Veryga (LVŽS)

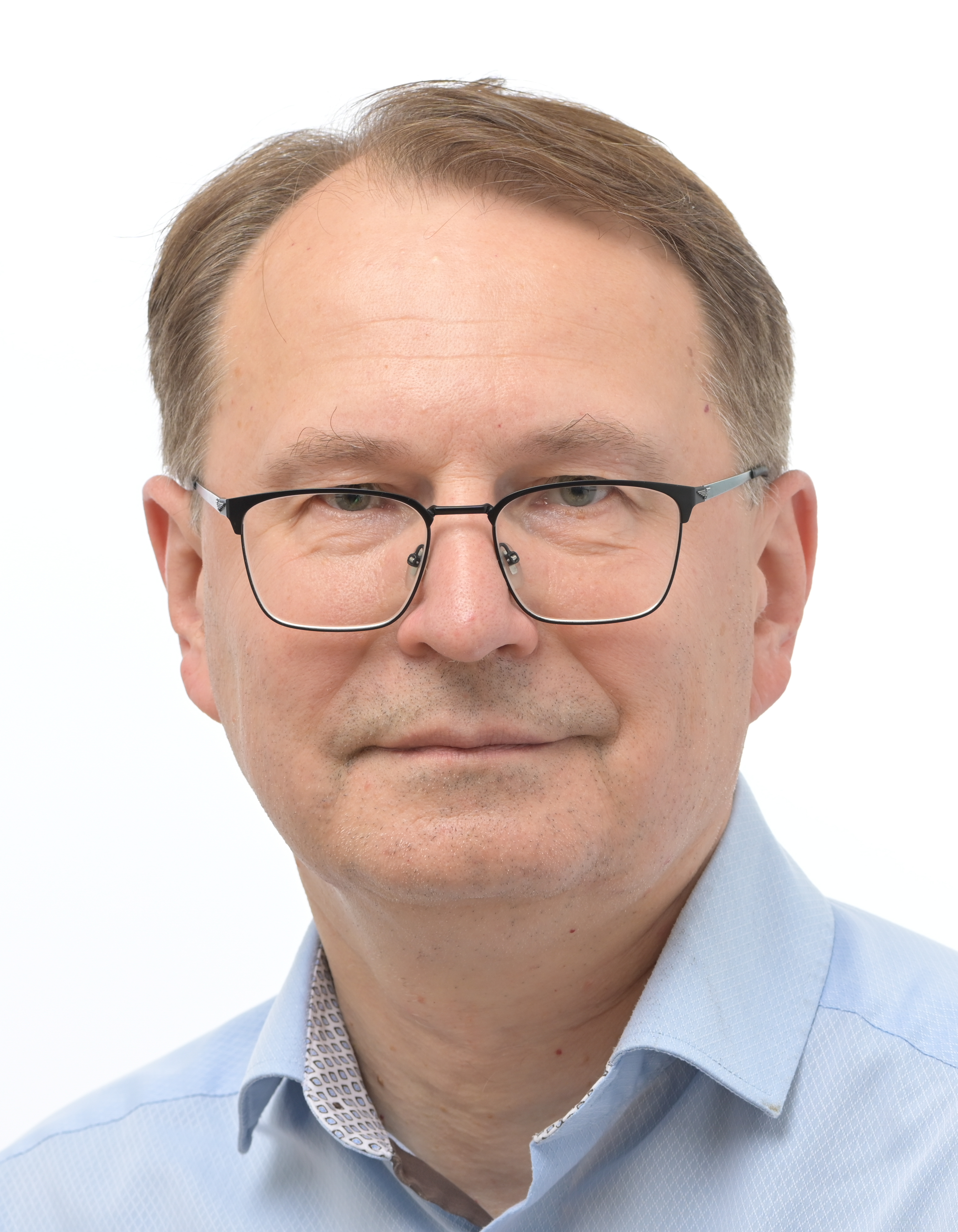
Dainius Žalimas (LP)

== Aftermath ==
Poor election results caused a crisis within the Labour Party and resignation of its leader, Andrius Mazuronis.

== See also ==
- Elections in Lithuania
- 2024 Lithuanian presidential election
- 2024 Lithuanian constitutional referendum
- 2024 Lithuanian parliamentary election
