= 2009 European Parliament election in Lithuania =

← 2004	7 June 2009	2014 →
- All 12 Lithuanian seats in the European Parliament

The 2009 European Parliament election in Lithuania was the election of the delegation from Lithuania to the European Parliament in 2009. It was a part of the wider 2009 European Parliament election. The Homeland Union (European Peoples Party) doubled their representation from 2 to 4, whilst Labour shrank from 5 to 1.

== Results ==
15 political parties were competing in the elections, of which 6 won seats. Lithuania has 12 seats in the European Parliament.

Party	Votes	%	Seats	+/–
Homeland Union – Christian Democrats	147,756	26.86	4	+2
Social Democratic Party	102,347	18.61	3	+1
Order and Justice	67,237	12.22	2	+1
Labour Party	48,368	8.79	1	–4
Electoral Action of Poles in Lithuania	46,293	8.42	1	+1
Liberal Movement	40,502	7.36	1	New
Liberal and Centre Union	19,105	3.47	0	–2
Lithuanian Centre Party	17,004	3.09	0	0
Christian Conservative Social Union	16,108	2.93	0	0
Front Party	13,341	2.43	0	New
Peasant Popular Union	10,285	1.87	0	–1
Civic Democratic Party	7,425	1.35	0	New
Samogitian Party	6,961	1.27	0	New
National Resurrection Party	5,717	1.04	0	New
National Party Lithuanian Way	1,568	0.29	0	New
Total	550,017	100.00	12	–1
Valid votes	550,017	97.38		
Invalid/blank votes	14,786	2.62		
Total votes	564,803	100.00		
Registered voters/turnout	2,692,397	20.98		
Source: VRK

== See also ==
- MEPs for Lithuania 2009–2014
- Members of the European Parliament 2009–2014
