= 2014 European Parliament election in Lithuania =

| ← 2009 | 25 May 2014 | 2019 → |
- All 11 Lithuanian seats in the European Parliament
- Turnout: 47.35%
| Party | Leader | Vote % | Seats | +/– |
|---|---|---|---|---|
| TS–LKD | Andrius Kubilius | 17.43 | 2 | −2 |
| LSDP | Algirdas Butkevičius | 17.26 | 2 | −1 |
| LS | Eligijus Masiulis | 16.55 | 2 | +1 |
| TT | Rolandas Paksas | 14.25 | 2 | 0 |
| DP | Loreta Graužinienė | 12.81 | 1 | 0 |
| LLRA | Valdemar Tomaševski | 8.05 | 1 | 0 |
| LVŽS | Ramūnas Karbauskis | 6.61 | 1 | +1 |
This lists parties that won seats. See the complete results below.

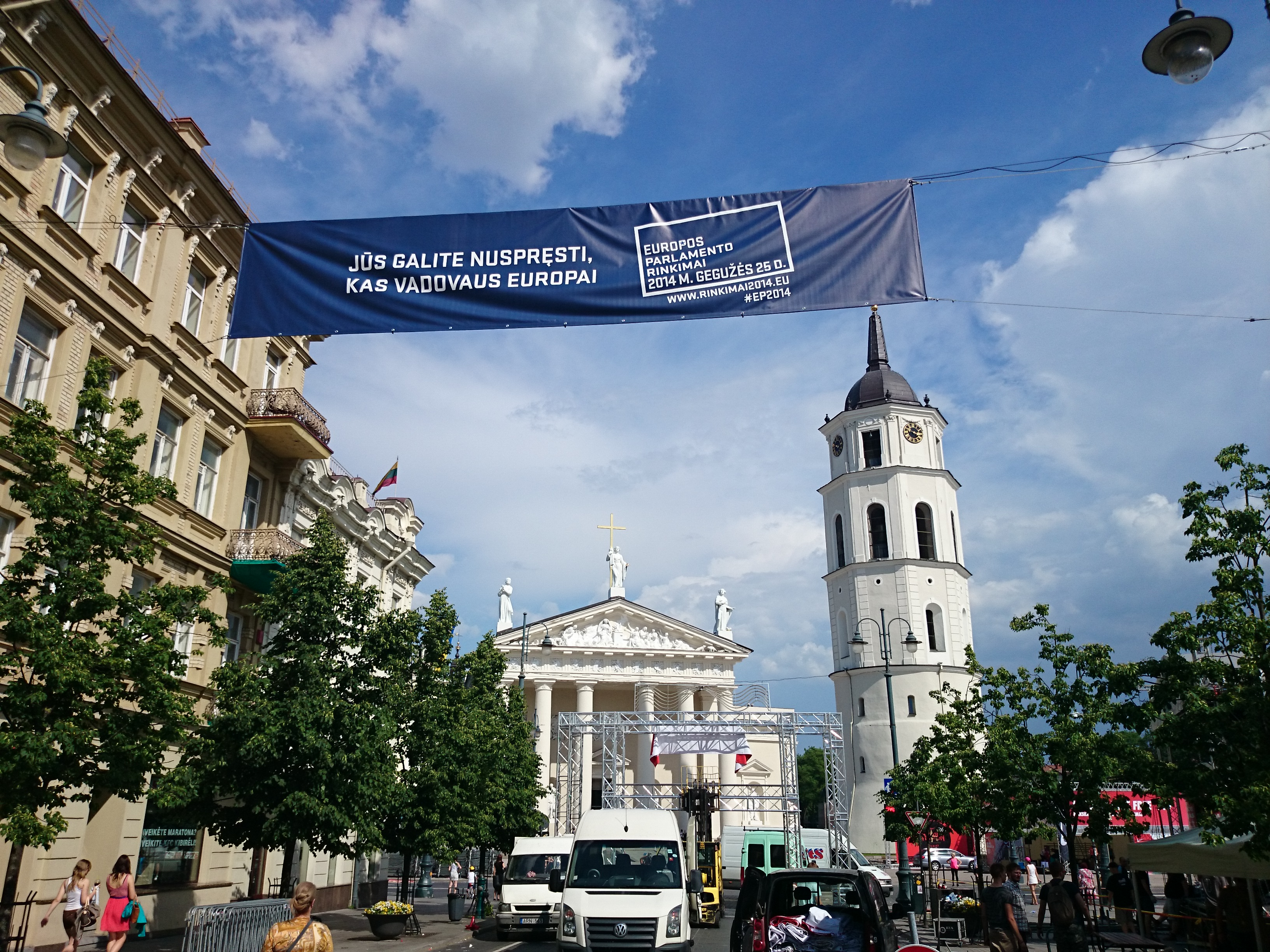
Election campaign poster in Vilnius

The 2014 European Parliament election in Lithuania was an election of the delegation from Lithuania to the European Parliament in 2014. It was part of the wider 2014 European election.

== Background ==
In 2013, Elections to the European Parliament Act introduced public election committees. Prior to these elections, only two public election committees collected signatures, but none of them collected enough signatures to be registered and take part in elections.

== Results ==
| Party | Votes | % | Seats |
|---|---|---|---|
| Homeland Union | 199,393 | 17.43 | 2 |
| Social Democratic Party | 197,477 | 17.26 | 2 |
| Liberal Movement | 189,373 | 16.55 | 2 |
| Order and Justice | 163,049 | 14.25 | 2 |
| Labour Party | 146,607 | 12.81 | 1 |
| Electoral Action of Poles in Lithuania–Lithuanian Russian Union | 92,108 | 8.05 | 1 |
| Lithuanian Farmers and Greens Union | 75,643 | 6.61 | 1 |
| Lithuanian Green Party | 40,696 | 3.56 | 0 |
| Lithuanian Nationalist Union | 22,858 | 2.00 | 0 |
| Liberal and Centre Union | 16,927 | 1.48 | 0 |
| Total | 1,144,131 | 100.00 | 11 |
| Valid votes | 1,144,131 | 94.46 | |
| Invalid/blank votes | 67,148 | 5.54 | |
| Total votes | 1,211,279 | 100.00 | |
| Registered voters/turnout | 2,557,950 | 47.35 | |
Source: VRK

== Analysis ==
Although opinion polls and pundits claimed for large Social Democratic Party victory, but elections were won by the Homeland Union by around 2,000 votes.

The Homeland Union won only in six municipalities (including Vilnius and Kaunas). The Social Democratic Party came at close second by the number of votes. The Liberal Movement came third, but it won in two municipalities only (Klaipėda and Neringa). The Order and Justice mainly won in northwest of the country.

== See also ==
- MEPs for Lithuania 2014–2019
- Members of the European Parliament 2014–2019
