= 2004 European Parliament election in Lithuania =

13 June 2004	2009 →
- All 13 Lithuanian seats in the European Parliament

The 2004 European Parliament election in Lithuania was the election of MEP representing Lithuania constituency for the 2004–2009 term of the European Parliament. It was the first European Parliament election in Lithuania following its admission to the European Union in May 2004. It was part of the wider 2004 European election. The vote took place on 13 June 2004.

== Results ==
The Labour Party received the most votes (30.16 per cent) and won in 55 municipalities. The Social Democratic Party of Lithuania received 14.43 per cent of the votes and won in 1 municipality. The Homeland Union received 12.58 per cent of the votes and won in 1 municipality.

Party	Votes	%	Seats
Labour Party	363,996	30.16	5
Social Democratic Party	174,124	14.43	2
Homeland Union	151,833	12.58	2
Liberal and Centre Union	135,601	11.23	2
Peasants and New Democratic Party Union	89,452	7.41	1
Liberal Democratic Party	82,420	6.83	1
Electoral Action of Poles in Lithuania–Lithuanian Russian Union	68,937	5.71	0
New Union (Social Liberals)	58,527	4.85	0
Lithuanian Christian Democrats	33,162	2.75	0
Christian Conservative Social Union	31,061	2.57	0
Party of National Progress	14,294	1.18	0
Lithuanian Centre Party	3,663	0.30	0
Total	1,207,070	100.00	13
Valid votes	1,207,070	94.00	
Invalid/blank votes	76,980	6.00	
Total votes	1,284,050	100.00	
Registered voters/turnout	2,654,311	48.38	
Source: VRK

== See also ==
- MEPS for Lithuania 2004-2009
- Members of the European Parliament 2004-2009
