= Tenth Seimas =

Tenth Seimas of Lithuania
←	Ninth Seimas of Lithuania	Eleventh Seimas of Lithuania	→
- Seimas Palace

Overview
- Legislative body: Seimas
- Jurisdiction: Lithuania
- Term: 2008—2012

The Tenth Seimas of Lithuania was a parliament (Seimas) elected in Lithuania. Elections took place on 12 October 2008, with the run-off on 26 October. The Seimas commenced its work on 17 November 2008 and served a four-year term, with the last session on 14 November 2012.

== Elections ==
In the elections in 2008, 70 members of the parliament were elected on proportional party lists and 71 in single member constituencies. Elections took place on 12 October 2008. Run-off elections were held on 26 October in the single-seat constituencies where no candidate secured a seat in the first round.

Party	Proportional			Constituency (first round)			Constituency (second round)			Total seats	+/–
Party	Votes	%	Seats	Votes	%	Seats	Votes	%	Seats	Total seats	+/–
Homeland Union	243,823	19.72	18	240,408	19.57	0	283,629	35.45	27	45	+20
National Resurrection Party	186,629	15.09	13	116,728	9.50	0	44,386	5.55	3	16	New
Order and Justice	156,777	12.68	11	147,656	12.02	0	81,188	10.15	4	15	+5
Social Democratic Party of Lithuania	144,890	11.72	10	175,023	14.25	2	136,345	17.04	13	25	+5
Labour Party + Youth	111,149	8.99	8	92,185	7.51	0	27,441	3.43	2	10	–29
Liberal Movement	70,862	5.73	5	78,539	6.39	0	50,066	6.26	6	11	New
Liberal and Centre Union	66,078	5.34	5	94,585	7.70	0	56,571	7.07	3	8	–10
Electoral Action of Poles in Lithuania	59,237	4.79	0	58,883	4.79	1	29,744	3.72	2	3	+1
Lithuanian Peasant Popular Union	46,162	3.73	0	64,328	5.24	0	36,658	4.58	3	3	–7
New Union (Social Liberals)	45,061	3.64	0	54,502	4.44	0	6,585	0.82	1	1	–10
Front Party	40,016	3.24	0	38,192	3.11	0				0	New
Young Lithuania	21,589	1.75	0	7,080	0.58	0	3,366	0.42	0	0	0
Civic Democratic Party	13,775	1.11	0	8,568	0.70	0	5,264	0.66	0	0	New
Lithuanian Russian Union	11,357	0.92	0	3,654	0.30	0				0	0
Lithuanian Social Democratic Union	10,642	0.86	0	10,396	0.85	0				0	0
Lithuanian Centre Party	8,669	0.70	0	1,776	0.14	0				0	0
Lithuanian Liberty Union				1,547	0.13	0				0	0
For a Fair Lithuania				993	0.08	0				0	0
Independents				33,156	2.70	0	38,804	4.85	4	4	–1
Total	1,236,716	100.00	70	1,228,199	100.00	3	800,047	100.00	68	141	0
Valid votes	1,236,716	94.41		1,228,199	93.77		800,047	95.74			
Invalid/blank votes	73,239	5.59		81,581	6.23		35,593	4.26			
Total votes	1,309,955	100.00		1,309,780	100.00		835,640	100.00			
Registered voters/turnout	2,696,090	48.59		2,696,075	48.58		2,581,305	32.37			
Source: VRK, CLEA

== Activities ==
Speaker of the Seimas

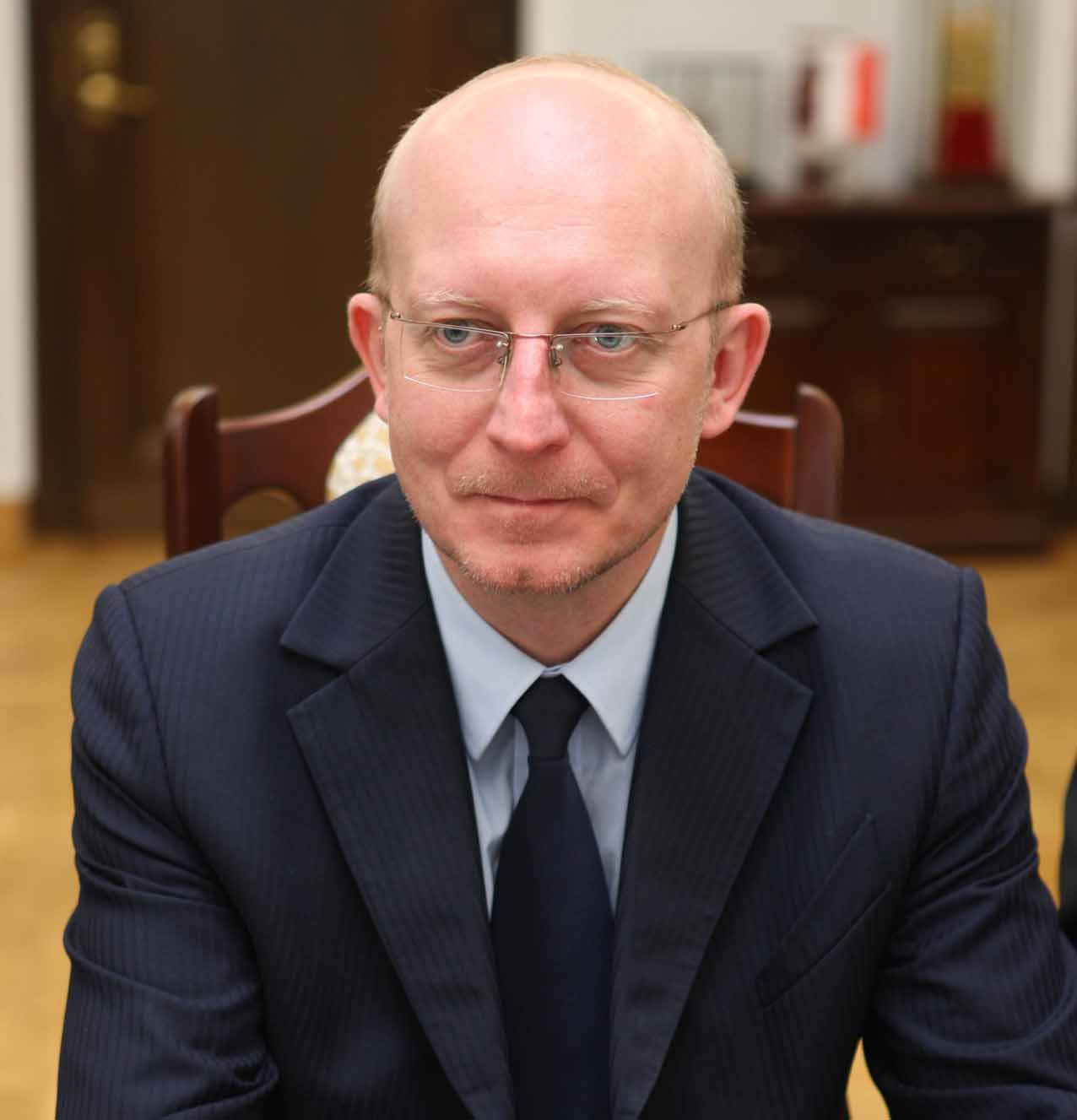
Arūnas Valinskas (National Resurrection Party)
17 November 2008 – 15 September 2009

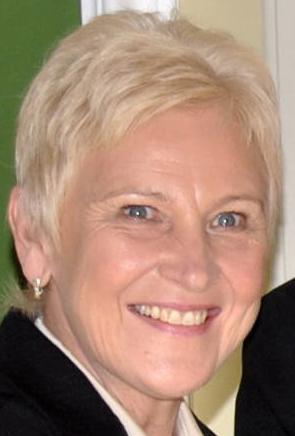
Irena Degutienė (Homeland Union)
17 September 2009 – 14 September 2012

Homeland Union was the largest party in the Tenth Seimas and formed a coalition government with the populist National Resurrection Party, Liberal Movement and Liberal and Centre Union. TV producer and showman Arūnas Valinskas of the National Resurrection Party was elected the Speaker of the Seimas. Ten months later, on 15 September 2009, he was removed from office in a secret ballot and two days later was replaced by Irena Degutienė of the Homeland Union, who became the first female Speaker of the Seimas.

The Seimas approved the leader of the Homeland Union Andrius Kubilius as the Prime Minister. Kubilius led the Government throughout the term.

The term of the Tenth Seimas was plagued by the Great Recession and the busting of the housing bubble. The Seimas and the Government responded with a wide-ranging tax reform, changing over 60 laws in the final days of 2008, including increasing the VAT rate and eliminating exceptions for certain products and services, increasing the corporate income tax rate, excise taxes of fuel, cigarettes and alcohol, and lowering the personal income tax rate. Due to its rushed nature the reform was much-criticized by experts and tax payers and many of the laws were later adjusted.

The reforms, together with the economic crisis and severe austerity measures, including cuts to public-sector salaries and pensions, brought about widespread dissatisfaction and protests. On 16 January 2009, more than 7,000 people gathered in front of the Seimas Palace in a protest that soon turned violent.

In the energy sector, the Seimas dissolved the energy holding company LEO LT that was expected to build the new Visaginas Nuclear Power Plant. However, the parliament approved a different project to build the power plant, with the Japanese company Hitachi as a strategic investor. The proposal failed to win an approval from Lithuanian voters in a referendum in 2012.

Several members of the Tenth Seimas were indicted for various offences, but only one was impeached and removed from office. Linas Karalius lost his mandate after taking a vacation while the Seimas was in session and having another member of the parliament, Aleksandras Sacharukas, vote in his name. Sacharucas was also indicted but narrowly won the impeachment vote.

== Composition ==
=== Parliamentary groups ===
After the elections, the parliamentary groups were formed in the Seimas, largely on the party lines: Social Democratic Party of Lithuania (LSDPF), Labour Party (DPF), Liberal and Centre Union (LCSF), Liberal Movement (LSF), Order and Justice (FTT, also included members of the Electoral Action of the Poles in Lithuania), Homeland Union - Lithuanian Christian Democrats (TSLKDF), National Resurrection Party (TPPF) and the Mixed Group of Members of the Seimas (MSNG).

In Summer 2009, the National Resurrection Party parliamentary group, which had been part of the ruling coalition, split into "One Lithuania" (FVL, Lithuanian: Frakcija Viena Lietuva) and Oak (ĄF, Lithuanian: Ąžuolo Frakcija) parliamentary groups. The former eventually former Christian Party (KPF) parliamentary group, while the latter joined with the Liberal and Centre Union.

By the end of the term of the Seimas, the following parliamentary groups were active.

Composition of the Seimas at the end of 2008-2012 term.
Name	Abbr.	Members
Labour Party	DPF	10
Order and Justice	FTT	17
Liberal and Centre Union	LCSF	12
Christian Party	KPF	8
Liberal Movement	LSF	12
Social Democratic Party of Lithuania	LSDPF	23
Homeland Union	TSF	43
Others	MSNG	13
Vacant seats		2

=== Members ===
A total of 154 members served on the Tenth Seimas.

Name, Surname	Constituency	Electoral list	Parliamentary group	Notes
Remigijus Ačas	Nationwide	TT	FTT	Until 9 April 2011
Mantas Adomėnas	Senamiesčio	TS	TSLKDF	
Vilija Aleknaitė-Abramikienė	Žirmūnų	TS	TSLKDF	
Raimundas Alekna	Nationwide	TS		Until 17 November 2008
Vytenis Andriukaitis	Nationwide	LSDP	LSDPF	
Arvydas Anušauskas	Nationwide	TS	TSLKDF	
Petras Auštrevičius	Nationwide	LRLS	LSF	
Audronius Ažubalis	Šeškinės	TS	TSLKDF	
Vincas Babilius	Nationwide	TPP	TPPF; ĄF (from 16 July 2009); TPPF (from 17 September 2009); LCSF (from 21 September 2010)	
Vaidotas Bacevičius	Kretingos	TS	TSLKDF	
Zigmantas Balčytis	Šilalės-Šilutės	LSDP	LSDPF	Until 28 June 2009
Virginija Baltraitienė	Kėdainių	DP	DPF	
Dailis Alfonsas Barakauskas	Nationwide	TT	FTT	From 18 November 2008
Mindaugas Bastys	Šakių	LSDP	LSDPF	
Rima Baškienė	Šiaulių kaimiškoji	LVLS	MSNG	
Asta Baukutė	Nationwide	TPP	TPPF; ĄF (from 16 July 2009); TPPF (from 17 September 2009); MSNG (from 21 September 2010)	
Antanas Baura	Anykščių-Kupiškio	LVLS	MSNG	
Danutė Bekintienė	Karoliniškių	TS	TSLKDF	
Agnė Bilotaitė	Nationwide	TS	TSLKDF	
Vilija Blinkevičiūtė	Nationwide	LSDP	LSDPF	Until 28 June 2009
Vytautas Bogušis	Nationwide	LCS	LCSF	
Bronius Bradauskas	Kaišiadorių-Elektrėnų	LSDP	LSDPF	
Saulius Bucevičius	Akmenės-Joniškio	DP	DPF	
Dainius Budrys	Nationwide	TPP	TPPF; ĄF (from 16 July 2009); TPPF (from 17 September 2009); LCSF (from 21 September 2010); LSDPF (from 12 April 2012)	
Valentinas Bukauskas	Nationwide	DP	DPF	
Andrius Burba	Nationwide	TPP	LCSF	From 18 November 2010
Algirdas Butkevičius	Vilkaviškio	LSDP	LSDPF	
Algis Čaplikas	Nationwide	LCS	LCSF	
Vida Marija Čigriejienė	Panemunės	TS	TSLKDF	
Rimantas Dagys	Šilainių	TS	TSLKDF	
Kęstutis Daukšys	Nationwide	DP	DPF	
Julius Dautartas	Nevėžio	TS	TSLKDF	
Irena Degutienė	Naujamiesčio	TS	TSLKDF	
Laimontas Dinius	Nationwide	TPP	TPPF; FVL (from 10 September 2009); KPF (from 11 February 2010); LSF (from 12 November 2010)	
Algimantas Dumbrava	Zarasų-Visagino	TT	FTT	
Arimantas Dumčius	Kalniečių	TS	TSLKDF	
Audrius Endzinas	Šilutės-Pagėgių	LRLS	LSF	
Vytautas Galvonas	Nationwide	TT	FTT	
Vytautas Gapšys	Nationwide	DP	DPF	
Vydas Gedvilas	Nationwide	DP	DPF	
Stanislovas Giedraitis	Mažeikių	Independent	LSDPF	
Kęstutis Glaveckas	Dainavos	LRLS	LSF	
Loreta Graužinienė	Nationwide	DP	DPF	
Petras Gražulis	Gargždų	TT	FTT	
Vytautas Grubliauskas	Danės	LRLS	LSF	Until 11 April 2011
Juozas Imbrasas	Nationwide	TT		Until 17 November 2008
Jonas Jagminas	Plungės-Rietavo	LSDP	LSDPF; MSNG (from 17 March 2011)	
Donatas Jankauskas	Kauno kaimiškoji	TS	TSLKDF	
Edmundas Jonyla	Raseinių	LSDP	LSDPF	
Rasa Juknevičienė	Žaliakalnio	TS	TSLKDF	
Jonas Juozapaitis	Pakruojo-Joniškio	LSDP	LSDPF	
Evaldas Jurkevičius	Baltijos	TS	TSLKDF	
Česlovas Juršėnas	Nationwide	LSDP	LSDPF	
Linas Karalius	Nationwide	TPP	TPPF; FVL (from 10 September 2009); KPF (from 11 February 2010)	Until 11 November 2010
Justinas Karosas	Lazdijų-Druskininkų	LSDP	LSPDF	Until 6 June 2012
Algis Kašėta	Varėnos-Eišiškių	LRLS	LSF	
Algis Kazulėnas	Rokiškio	TS	TSLKDF	
Ligitas Kernagis	Nationwide	TPP	TPPF; FVL (from 10 September 2009); KPF (from 11 February 2010)	
Gediminas Kirkilas	Nationwide	LSDP	LSDPF	
Egidijus Klumbys	Nationwide	TT	FTT	
Kęstas Komskis	Nationwide	TT	FTT	
Jonas Kondrotas	Nationwide	DP	MSNG; DPF (from 19 April 2011)	From 12 April 2011
Andrius Kubilius	Antakalnio	TS	TSLKDF	
Dalia Kuodytė	Nationwide	LRLS	LSF	
Rytas Kupčinskas	Aleksoto-Vilijampolės	TS	TSLKDF	
Vytautas Kurpuvesas	Nationwide	TPP	TPPF; FVL (from 10 September 2009); KPF (from 11 February 2010); MSNG (from 21 June 2012)	
Kazimieras Kuzminskas	Nationwide	TS	TSLKDF	
Evaldas Lementauskas	Nationwide	TT	MSNG	
Arminas Lydeka	Nationwide	LCS	LCSF; MSNG (from 21 September 2010); LSF (from 23 September 2010)	
Jonas Liesys	Trakų-Elektrėnų	LCS	LCSF	
Petras Luomanas	Aukštaitijos	TS	TSLKDF	
Michal Mackevič	Širvintų-Vilniaus	LLRA	MSNG; FTT (from 21 November 2008)	
Vincė Vaidevutė Margevičienė	Centro	TS	TSLKDF	
Eligijus Masiulis	Marių	LRLS	LSF	
Kęstutis Masiulis	Kelmės	TS	TSLKDF	
Antanas Matulas	Pasvalio-Panevėžio	TS	TSLKDF	
Vitas Matuzas	Nationwide	TS	TSLKDF	
Andrius Mazuronis	Nationwide	TT	FTT	
Valentinas Mazuronis	Nationwide	TT	FTT	
Donalda Meiželytė	Nationwide	TPP	TPPF; FVL (from 10 September 2009); KPF (from 11 February 2010)	
Artūras Melianas	Naujosios Vilnios	LCS	LCSF	
Dangutė Mikutienė	Nationwide	DP	DPF	
Albinas Mitrulevičius	Marijampolės	LSDP	LSDPF	From 27 February 2011
Jaroslav Narkevič	Vilniaus-Trakų	LLRA	MSNG; FTT (from 21 November 2008)	
Gediminas Navaitis	Nationwide	LRLS	LSF; MSNG (from 21 June 2012)	
Antanas Nedzinskas	Dzūkijos	TPP	TPPF; ĄF (from 16 July 2009); TPPF (from 17 September 2009); LCSF (from 21 September 2010)	
Juozas Olekas	Nationwide	LSDP	LSDPF	
Juozas Palionis	Prienų	LSDP	LSDPF	Until 17 October 2011
Bronius Pauža	Jurbarko	LSDP	LSDPF	
Marija Aušrinė Pavilionienė	Nationwide	LSDP	LSDPF	From 7 July 2009
Saulius Pečeliūnas	Nationwide	TS	TSLKDF	
Almantas Petkus	Telšių	TT	FTT	
Milda Petrauskienė	Nationwide	LSDP	LSDPF	
Jonas Pinskus	Nationwide	DP	DPF	Until 12 April 2011
Edmundas Pupinis	Utenos	TS	TSLKDF	
Naglis Puteikis	Danės	TS	MSNG; TSLKDF (from 13 September 2011)	From 26 July 2011
Auksutė Ramanauskaitė-Skokauskienė	Nationwide	TS	TSLKDF	
Konstantas Ramelis	Ignalinos-Švenčionių	LVLS	MSNG	From 20 July 2011
Jonas Ramonas	Nationwide	TT	FTT; KPF (from 11 February 2010)	
Jurgis Razma	Nationwide	TS	TSLKDF	
Algis Rimas	Marijampolės	LSDP	LSDPF	Until 9 August 2010
Rimas Antanas Ručys	Nationwide	TT	FTT	
Rūta Rutkelytė	Nationwide	TS	TSLKDF	From 18 November 2008
Julius Sabatauskas	Nationwide	LSDP	LSDPF	
Liudvikas Sabutis	Nationwide	TS	TSLKDF	
Aleksandr Sacharuk	Nationwide	TPP	TPPF; FVL (from 10 September 2009); KPF (from 11 February 2010)	From 18 November 2008
Algimantas Salamakinas	Radviliškio	LSDP	LSDPF	
Paulius Saudargas	Justiniškių	TS	TSLKDF	
Valerijus Simulik	Dainų	NS	MSNG; TPPF (from 5 May 2009); FVL (from 10 September 2009); MSNG (from 22 September 2009); LSDPF (from 30 November 2010)	
Rimantas Sinkevičius	Jonavos	LSDP	LSDPF	
Algirdas Sysas	Nationwide	LSDP	LSDPF	
Rimantas Smetona	Nationwide	TT	FTT	
Gintaras Songaila	Nationwide	TS	TSLKDF; MSNG (from 10 September 2011)	
Aurelija Stancikienė	Nationwide	TS	TSLKDF; MSNG (from 7 June 2012)	
Jonas Stanevičius	Skuodo-Mažeikių	Independent	TPPF; FVL (from 10 September 2009); KPF (from 11 February 2010)	
Česlovas Vytautas Stankevičius	Nationwide	TS	TSLKDF	
Kazys Starkevičius	Pramonės	TS	TSLKDF	
Gintaras Steponavičius	Lazdynų	LRLS	LSF	
Arūnė Stirblytė	Vakarinė	TPP	TPPF; ĄF (from 16 July 2009); TPPF (from 17 September 2009); LCSF (from 21 September 2010)	
Saulius Stoma	Nationwide	TPP	TPPF; FVL (from 10 September 2009); TSLKDF (from 24 September 2009); MSNG (from 26 June 2012)	
Valentinas Stundys	Molėtų-Švenčionių	TS	TSLKDF	
Stasys Šedbaras	Tauragės	TS	TSLKDF	
Andrius Šedžius	Saulės	LSDP	LSDPF; MSNG (from 15 September 2010)	
Irena Šiaulienė	Nationwide	LSDP	LSDPF	
Žilvinas Šilgalis	Nationwide	LCS	LCSF; MSNG (from 2 July 2010)	
Jonas Šimėnas	Nationwide	TS	TSLKDF	
Raimondas Šukys	Fabijoniškių	LCS	LCSF	
Leonard Talmont	Vilniaus-Šalčininkų	LLRA	FTT	From 24 November 2009
Erikas Tamašauskas	Nationwide	LRLS	LSF	
Daiva Tamošiūnaitė	Nationwide	TPP		Until 17 November 2008
Dalia Teišerskytė	Nationwide	LRLS	LSF	
Valdemar Tomaševski	Vilniaus-Šalčininkų	LLRA	MSNG; FTT (from 21 November 2008)	Until 21 June 2009
Kazimieras Uoka	Nationwide	TS	TSLKDF; MSNG (from 10 September 2011)	
Justinas Urbanavičius	Kauno-Kėdainių	TS	TSLKDF	
Viktor Uspaskich	Nationwide	DP	DPF	Until 15 June 2009
Zita Užlytė	Alytaus	TPP	TPPF; FVL (from 10 September 2009); KPF (from 11 February 2010)	
Arūnas Valinskas	Nationwide	TPP	TPPF; ĄF (from 16 July 2009); TPPF (from 17 September 2009); LCSF (from 21 September 2010)	
Ingrida Valinskienė	Nationwide	TPP	TPPF; ĄF (from 16 July 2009); TPPF (from 17 September 2009); LCSF (from 21 September 2010)	
Ona Valiukevičiūtė	Nationwide	TT	FTT	
Valdemaras Valkiūnas	Biržų-Kupiškio	Independent	LCSF; ĄF (from 16 July 2009); TPPF (from 17 July 2009); FVL (from 10 September 2009); KPF (from 11 February 2010); MSNG (from 30 March 2010); LCSF (from 2 July 2010); MSNG (from 30 June 2012)	
Mantas Varaška	Suvalkijos	Independent	TPPF; FVL (from 10 September 2009); KPF (from 11 February 2010); TSLKDF (from 10 March 2011); MSNG (from 19 April 2012)	
Egidijus Vareikis	Nationwide	TS	TSLKDF	
Julius Veselka	Ukmergės	TT	FTT	
Birutė Vėsaitė	Nationwide	LSDP	LSDPF	
Arvydas Vidžiūnas	Nationwide	TS	TSLKDF	
Mečislovas Zasčiurinskas	Nationwide	DP	DPF	
Emanuelis Zingeris	Nationwide	TS	TSLKDF	
Artūras Zuokas	Nationwide	LCS	LCSF	Until 30 November 2009
Agnė Zuokienė	Nationwide	LCS	MSNG	From 8 December 2009
Edvardas Žakaris	Aušros	LSDP	LSDPF	
Pranas Žeimys	Pajūrio	TS	TSLKDF	
Remigijus Žemaitaitis	Šilalės-Šilutės	TT	FTT	From 8 December 2009
Vidmantas Žiemelis	Nationwide	TS	TSLKDF; KPF (from 16 March 2010)	
Rokas Žilinskas	Nationwide	TPP	TPPF; FVL (from 10 September 2009); KPF (from 11 February 2010); MSNG (from 19 April 2011); TSLKDF (from 23 June 2011)	
