= Elections in Lithuania =

Elections in Lithuania are held to select members of the parliament, the president, members of the municipal councils and mayors, as well as delegates to the European Parliament. Lithuanian citizens can also vote in mandatory or consultative referendums.

Lithuania was one of the first countries in the world to grant women a right to vote in the elections. Lithuanian women were allowed to vote by the 1918 Constitution of Lithuania and used their newly granted right for the first time in 1919. By doing so, Lithuania allowed it earlier than such democratic countries as the United States (1920), France (1945), and Switzerland (1971).

Seventy-one of the members in the 141-seat parliament, elected to a four-year term, are elected in single-seat constituencies, in a majority vote. The remaining 70 members are elected in a nationwide election based on proportional representation. The structure of the elections means that a large number of parties are represented in the parliament and coalition governments are common. The head of the state - the president - is elected to a five-year term in a majority vote, with the president eligible for up to two terms in office. More than 1500 municipal council members are elected in local elections to four-year terms, with the majority of the seats allocated using proportional representation and the mayors elected directly by residents in a majority vote. The Lithuanian representatives in the European Parliament, currently numbering 11, are elected using proportional representation every five years.

Fifteen referendums have been organized in Lithuania, initiated by either citizens or the parliament. Of these, only four have seen the referendum question approved in a referendum deemed to have taken place.

Voting in elections is generally open to all citizens of Lithuania who are at least 18 years of age. Citizens of other European Union countries that permanently reside in Lithuania can vote in the Lithuanian elections to the European Parliament. Voting in municipal elections is open to all permanent residents of Lithuania, regardless of their citizenship.

The voting process is organized by the Central Electoral Commission and subordinate electoral bodies and is monitored by local and international observers. The voters cast a secret ballot and the elections have generally been assessed as free and fair, although allegations of irregularities have been common.

== Elections to the Seimas ==
=== Process and eligibility ===
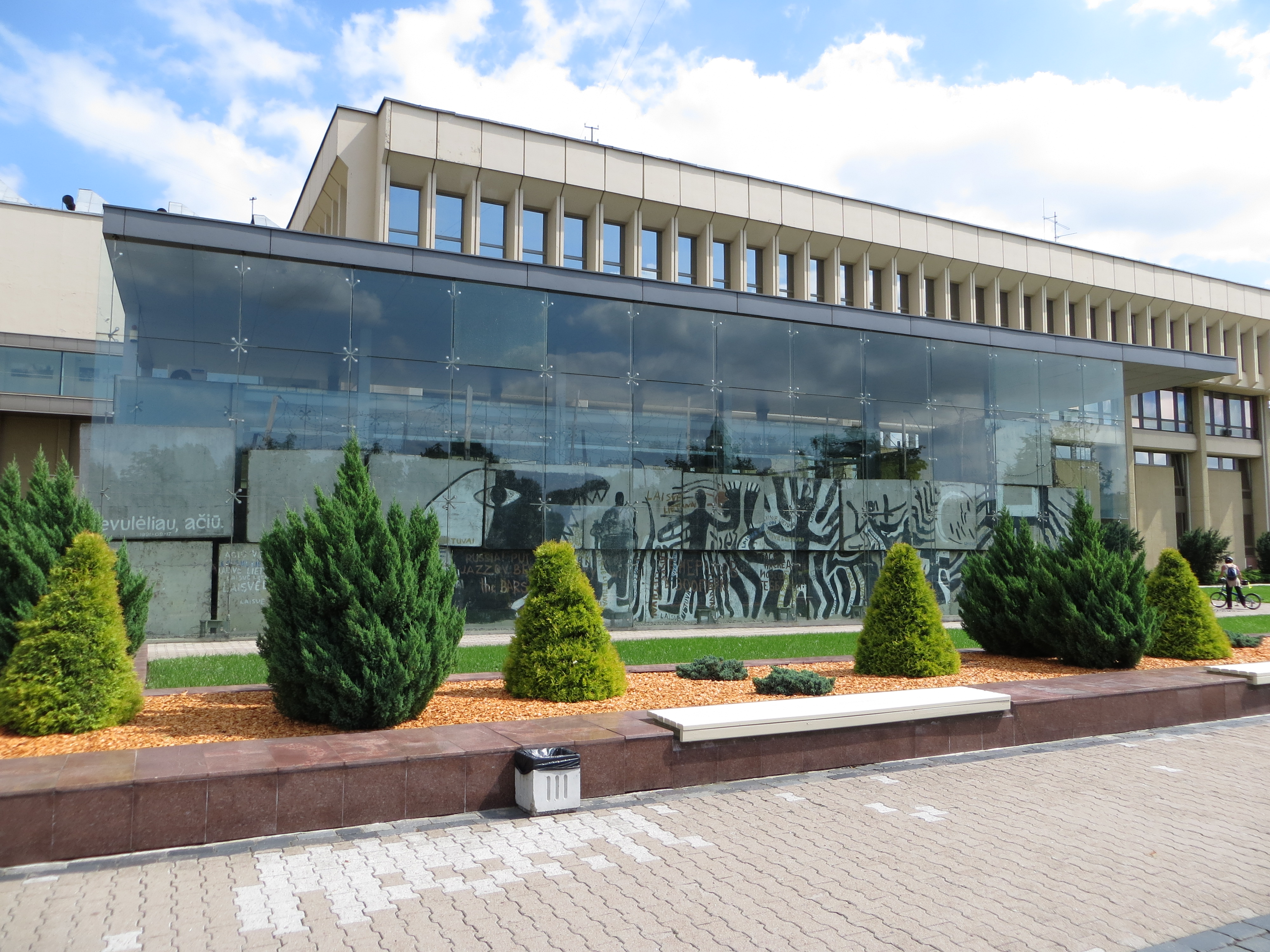
Seimas Palace in Vilnius

The parliament (Lietuvos Respublikos Seimas) has 141 members, elected to a four-year term, with 71 members elected in single-seat constituencies and 70 members elected by proportional representation. Lithuania exhibits a fragmented multi-party system, with a number of small parties in which coalition governments are common. Ordinary elections to the Seimas take place on the second Sunday of October.

To be eligible for election, candidates must be at least 21 years old on the election day, not under allegiance to a foreign state and permanently reside in Lithuania. Persons serving or due to serve a sentence imposed by the court 65 days before the election are not eligible. Also, judges, citizens performing military service, and servicemen of professional military service and officials of statutory institutions and establishments may not stand for election.

In addition, the Lithuanian law stipulates that a person who has been removed from office through impeachment may not be elected for four years after their removal, although the limit of four years has been suspended by the Lithuanian constitutional court, which stated that the Lithuanian constitution does not allow for persons impeached for a breach of constitution or their oath of office to stand in elections indefinitely. This provision of the constitution had been ruled to be in breach of the European Convention on Human Rights.

Parliament members in the 71 single-seat constituencies are elected in a majority vote if the voter turnout in the constituency is at least 40%. If the voter turnout is less than 40%, the candidate with the most votes (and at least 20% of the votes) is declared the winner. If there are more than two candidates and no candidate wins in the first round, a second round of voting is held within 15 days. The two leading candidates from the first round are eligible for the second round of voting. The candidate that gets more votes in the second round is declared the winner, regardless of voter turnout.

The remaining 70 seats are allocated to the participating political parties proportionally to the share of vote received, using the largest remainder method. Parties receiving less than 5% of the vote and joint multi-party electoral lists receiving less than 7% of the vote are not eligible to receive any seats, unless the remaining eligible parties received less than 60% of the vote.

Candidates take the seats allocated to their parties based on the preference lists submitted before the election. The preference lists are adjusted by preference votes given by the voters.

=== Elections and results ===
Nine elections of the Seimas have been held in Lithuania since independence.

The first election in independent Lithuania was held on 25 October 1992, with a run-off on 15 November. 24 parties and political movements contested the Seimas seats. The election was won by the (ex-communist) Democratic Labor Party of Lithuania, which gained 73 seats and 44% of the popular vote. Analysts attributed the victory to the support the party found among the Russian and Polish minorities, farmers, as well as to popular dissatisfaction with the economic situation, particularly the fuel shortage. Sąjūdis, which had led Lithuania into independence finished distant second with 30 seats.

The 1996 parliamentary election was held on 20 October with the run-off on 10 November. This time, Democratic Labor Party of Lithuania suffered as a result of poor economic situation and financial scandals, including one involving former Prime Minister Adolfas Šleževičius. The election was won by the Homeland Union - Lithuanian Conservative Party, which gained 70 seats and 31% of the vote. Lithuanian Christian Democratic Party were distant second with 16 seats, followed by Democratic Labor Party of Lithuania with 12.

The 2000 parliamentary election was held on 8 October. The election was held in the context of economic crisis brought about by Russian financial crisis of 1998, austerity and high-profile privatization. Liberal Union of Lithuania won the most seats of any party in the election, with 33, although a joint list "Social-Democratic Coalition of Algirdas Brazauskas" won the highest share of the popular vote with 31%. The Liberal Union formed the government with New Union (Social Liberals), Lithuanian Centre Union and the Modern Christian Democrats. The coalition was short-lived and Algirdas Brazauskas, a social democrat, became the prime minister less than a year later.

The Social Democrats remained at the helm of the government after the 2004 parliamentary election, which was held on 10 October, with the run-off on 24 October. The party was the third-largest in the parliament after the election with 20 seats, behind Labour Party with 39 and Homeland Union (Lithuanian Conservatives) with 25, but managed to govern together with New Union (Social Liberals) (11 seats), the Labour Party and the support of other parties. It was the first time since independence that a ruling government survived an election.

The 2008 parliamentary election was held on 12 October, with a run-off on 26 October. Homeland Union won the election dominated by taxation and potential introduction of Euro. Rising inflation and potential economic downturn were also high on the agenda following several years of rapid growth. Homeland Union (45 seats) formed a coalition government with populist and short-lived National Resurrection Party (16 seats), Liberal Movement (11 seats) and Liberal and Centre Union (8 seats). Social Democrats was the largest party in opposition with 25 seats.

The 2012 parliamentary election was held on 14 October, with a run-off on 28 October. The Social Democrats became the largest party in the Seimas and defeated the center-right coalition of Andrius Kubilius. The Social Democrats, with 38 seats, formed a government coalition with Labour Party (19 seats), Order and Justice (11 seats) and Electoral Action of Poles in Lithuania (8 seats), with the latter party later withdrawing from the government. Homeland Union (33 seats) withdrew to the opposition after four years in government.

The 2016 parliamentary election was held on 9 October, with a run-off on 23 October. The election was a surprise victory for Peasant and Greens Union, which won 54 seats in the parliament - the largest tally by a single party in Lithuania for 20 years. Homeland Union won the largest share of the vote (22.63%) and 20 mandates in the nationwide constituency, but a disappointing performance in single-member constituencies left the party a distant second with 31 seats. Peasants and Greens formed a coalition with the Social Democrats, who won 17 seats in the parliament.

The 2020 parliamentary election was held on 11 October, with a run-off on 25 October. It was a victory for the Homeland Union, which finished first with 50 seats and formed a centre-right coalition with the Liberal Movement (13 seats) and the newly formed Freedom Party (11 seats). The Peasant and Greens Union (32 seats) became the largest party in the opposition.

The 2024 parliamentary election was held on 13 October, with a run-off on 27 October 2024. The Lithuanian Social Democratic Party finished first with 52 seats and formed a centre-left coalition with two newly formed parties: the Union of Democrats "For Lithuania" (14 seats) and Dawn of Nemunas (20 seats). The Homeland Union (28 seats) became the largest party in the opposition.

Election	Turnout	Largest party/list			2nd largest party/list			3rd largest party/list		
Election	Turnout		%	Seats		%	Seats		%	Seats
1992	75.3%	Democratic Labour Party of Lithuania	44%	73	Sąjūdis	21.2%	30	Coalition: Lithuanian Christian Democratic Party, Lithuanian Union of Political Prisoners and Deportees, Lithuanian Democratic Party	12.6%	18
1996	52.9%	Homeland Union - Lithuanian Conservatives	31.34%	70	Lithuanian Christian Democratic Party	10.43%	16	Democratic Labour Party of Lithuania	10.01%	12
2000	58.6%	Social-Democratic Coalition of Algirdas Brazauskas	31.08%	51	Liberal Union of Lithuania	17.25%	33	New Union (Social Liberals)	19.64%	28
2004	46.1%	Labour Party	28.4%	39	Working for Lithuania: Social Democratic Party of Lithuania, New Union (Social Liberals)	20.7%	31	Homeland Union (Lithuanian Conservatives)	14.8%	25
2008	48.59%	Homeland Union – Lithuanian Christian Democrats	19.72%	45	Social Democratic Party of Lithuania	11.72%	25	National Resurrection Party	15.09%	16
2012	52.93%	Social Democratic Party of Lithuania	18.37%	38	Homeland Union – Lithuanian Christian Democrats	15.08%	33	Labour Party	19.82%	29
2016	50.64%	Lithuanian Peasant and Greens Union	22.45%	54	Homeland Union – Lithuanian Christian Democrats	22.63%	31	Social Democratic Party of Lithuania	15.04%	17
2020	47.81%	Homeland Union – Lithuanian Christian Democrats	25.77%	50	Lithuanian Peasant and Greens Union	18.07%	32	Social Democratic Party of Lithuania	9.58%	13
2024	52.20%	Social Democratic Party of Lithuania	19.70%	52	Homeland Union – Lithuanian Christian Democrats	18.35%	28	Dawn of Nemunas	15.26%	20

==== Results of the 2024 election ====
Parliamentary elections were held in Lithuania on 13 and 27 October 2024 to elect the 141 members of the Seimas. Members were elected in 71 single-member constituencies using the two-round system, and the remaining 70 in a single nationwide constituency using proportional representation. The first round was held on 13 October and the second round on 27 October.

The elections were won by the Social Democratic Party of Lithuania (LSDP), which secured 19.32% of the popular vote and 52 seats, up from 9.58% and 13 seats in the previous elections in 2020. The Homeland Union (TS–LKD), the largest party in the ruling centre-right coalition in the preceding Seimas, finished a distant second, securing 28 seats, down from its previous 50.

Following the first round of the election, the Social Democrats entered into coalition talks with the Lithuanian Farmers and Greens Union (LVŽS) and the Union of Democrats "For Lithuania" (DSVL), which had split from the latter. After the second round, the consultations were expanded to include the Liberals' Movement (LS), which had been part of the outgoing conservative-led coalition, and Dawn of Nemunas (PPNA), a new nationalist party that finished in third place overall.

The LSDP eventually reached a deal with DSVL and PPNA to form a coalition government. The Social Democrats' decision to include the Dawn of Nemunas party, whose founder is known for making controversial statements, prompted domestic and international backlash.

== Presidential elections ==
=== Election process and eligibility ===
The President of Lithuania is the head of state of the country, elected to a five-year term in a majority vote. Elections take place on the last Sunday no more than two months before the end of current presidential term.

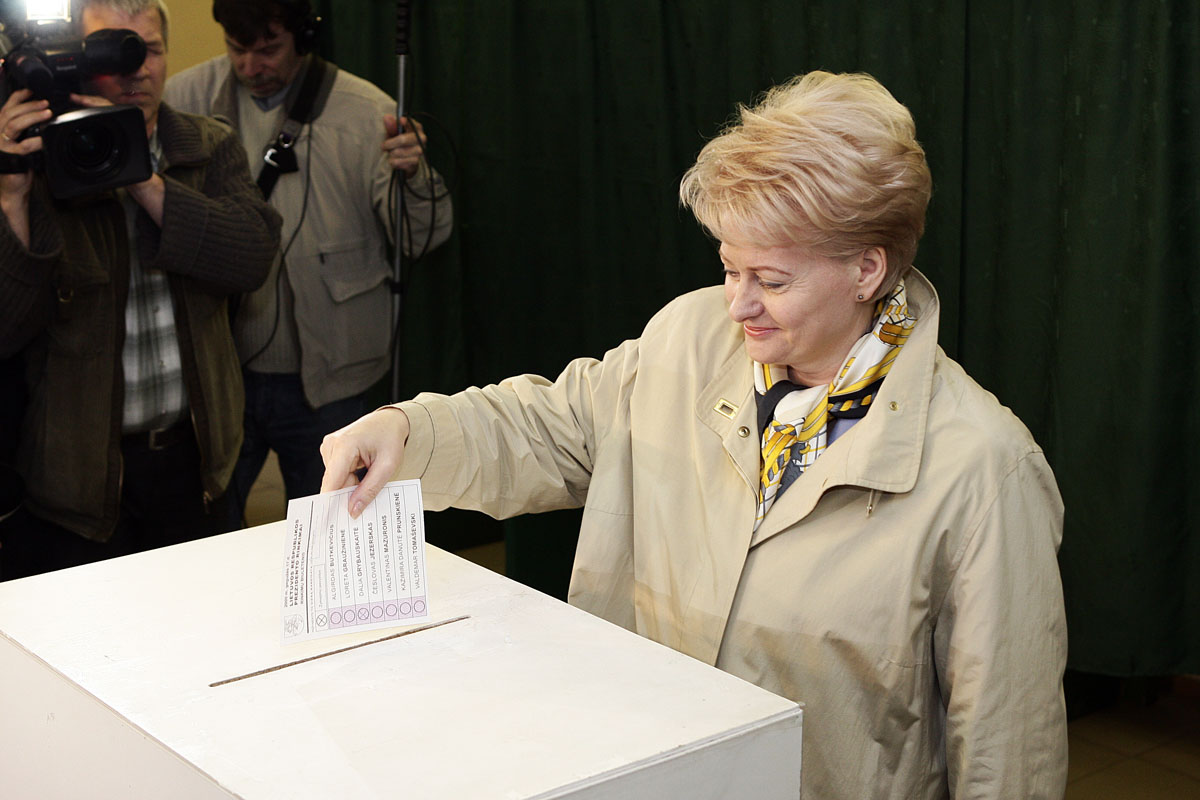
Dalia Grybauskaitė casting a vote in the 2009 presidential election

To be eligible for election, candidates must be at least 40 years old on the election day and reside in Lithuania for at least three years, in addition to satisfying the eligibility criteria for a member of the parliament. A person who has been removed from office through impeachment for breach of constitution or an oath of office may not be elected as a president. This provision of the constitution had been ruled to be in breach of the European Convention on Human Rights.

The president is elected in a majority vote if the voter turnout is at least 50%. If the voter turnout is less than 50%, the candidate is declared the winner only if they get the votes of at least 1/3 of all eligible voters. If there are more than two candidates and no candidate wins in the first round, a second round of voting is held on a Sunday no more than two weeks after the first round. The two leading candidates from the first round are eligible for the second round of voting and the candidate that gets more votes in the second round is declared the winner. If two or fewer candidates stand for election and none manage to win in the first round, a new election is held no more than three months after the election date.

=== Elections and results ===
Eight presidential elections have taken place in Lithuania since independence.

Algirdas Brazauskas, a former communist party leader, was the first elected president of independent Lithuania. Election took place on 14 February 1993, with Brazauskas defeating Stasys Lozoraitis, a Lithuanian diplomat, who had spent almost all his life in Italy and the United States representing interwar Lithuania. Brazauskas won with 60% of the vote.

Brazauskas did not stand in the 1997-1998 presidential election, held on 21 December 1997, with the second round on 4 January 1998. In the election, Artūras Paulauskas, a former Prosecutor General of Lithuania won the first round with 44.7% of the vote, but was defeated in the second round by Valdas Adamkus, a former US civil servant, who got 50% of the vote compared to 49.2% by Paulauskas.

Adamkus stood for reelection in the Lithuanian presidential election, 2002–2003, which took place 22 December 2002, with the second round on 5 January 2003. After leading in the first round with 35.1% of the vote, Adamkus was convincingly defeated in the second round by Rolandas Paksas, a former Prime Minister and Mayor of Vilnius who received 54.2% of the vote.

Rolandas Paksas was subsequently impeached and removed from office, prompting early election in 2004. Valdas Adamkus became the first President of Lithuania to be elected for a second term, leading the first round with 30.2% of the vote and defeating Kazimiera Prunskienė in the second round with 51.8%.

Valdas Adamkus was not eligible to stand for reelection in 2009 due to term limits. In the election that took place on 17 May 2009, European Commissioner Dalia Grybauskaitė won in the first round with more than 68% of the vote. Grybauskaitė became the country's first female president.

Grybauskaitė was reelected in the 2014 presidential election that took place on 11 May 2014, with a second round held on 25 May. Grybauskaitė received 45.9% of vote in the first round and defeated Zigmantas Balčytis in the second round with 57.9% of all votes. She became the first president of Lithuania to be reelected for a second consecutive term.

The 2019 presidential election was held in two rounds on 12 and 26 May. Grybauskaitė was not eligible to stand for reelection due to term limits. In the first round, the two leading candidates, Ingrida Šimonytė and Gitanas Nausėda, both received 31% of the vote. Nausėda won in the second round with 66% of the vote. Šimonytė would go on to be appointed prime minister following the 2020 Seimas elections.

Nausėda was reelected in the 2024 presidential election, which took place on 12 and 26 May. In the first round, the independent candidate Nausėda (Note: Supported by the Social Democratic Party of Lithuania and the Lithuanian Regions Party) finished first with 44% of votes, while then-prime-minister Šimonytė of the Homeland Union finished second with 20%. Nausėda won in the second round with 75% of the vote.

Election	Turnout, %		Winner, vote %			Runner-up, vote %		
Election	First round	Second round		First round	Second round		First round	Second round
1993	78.07	-	Algirdas Brazauskas	60.03	-	Stasys Lozoraitis	38.28	-
1997-1998	71.45	73.66	Valdas Adamkus	27.56	49.96	Artūras Paulauskas	44.73	49.22
2002-2003	53.92	52.65	Rolandas Paksas	19.40	54.15	Valdas Adamkus	35.06	44.83
2004	48.40	52.46	Valdas Adamkus	30.18	51.83	Kazimiera Prunskienė	20.60	46.66
2009	51.76	-	Dalia Grybauskaitė	68.21	-	Algirdas Butkevičius	11.68	-
2014	52.23	47.37	Dalia Grybauskaitė	45.92	57.90	Zigmantas Balčytis	13.62	40.10
2019	57.37	53.88	Gitanas Nausėda	30.94	65.68	Ingrida Šimonytė	31.31	33.04
2024	59.95	49.74	Gitanas Nausėda	43.95	75.29	Ingrida Šimonytė	20.05	24.71

==== Results of the 2024 election ====
Presidential elections were held in Lithuania on 12 May 2024, alongside a referendum on allowing multiple citizenships. Incumbent President Gitanas Nausėda won re-election to a second term. When candidate registrations closed before the election, the Lithuanian Central Election Commission had confirmed fifteen viable registrations; of those, twelve proceeded to collect signatures from the minimum 20,000 voters. Four of those contenders were later repudiated or dropped out, leaving eight on the ballot.

A second round was held on 26 May as no candidate received an absolute majority in the first round. This saw Nausėda and Prime Minister Ingrida Šimonytė facing off in the runoff, a rematch of the 2019 election in which Nausėda had defeated Šimonytė. Nausėda won re-election, defeating Šimonytė in a second-round landslide with 75% of the vote – the largest margin of victory in a free election for any presidential candidate in the history of Lithuania.

== Municipal elections ==
=== Election process and eligibility ===
Each municipality in Lithuania is governed by a municipal council and a mayor, who is a member of the municipal council. The number of members, elected on a four-year term, in each municipal council depends on the size of the municipality and varies from 15 (in municipalities with fewer than 5,000 residents) to 51 (in municipalities with more than 500,000 residents). 1,524 municipal council members were elected in 2015. Members of the council, with the exception of the mayor, are elected using proportional representation. Starting with 2015, the mayor is elected directly by the majority of residents of the municipality. Before 2015, the mayors were elected by the municipal councils. Ordinary elections take place on a date proclaimed by the parliament no earlier than two months and no later than a month before the end of the current term.

To be eligible for election, candidates must be at least 20 years old on the election day and permanently reside in the respective municipality. Persons serving or due to serve a sentence imposed by the court 65 days before the election are not eligible. Also, residents performing military service, and servicemen of professional military service and officials of statutory institutions and establishments may not stand for election.

The mayor is elected in a majority vote if the voter turnout in the constituency is at least 40%. If the voter turnout is less than 40%, the candidate with the most votes (and at least 20% of the votes) is declared the winner. If there are more than two candidates and no candidate wins in the first round, a second round of voting is held within 15 days. The two leading candidates from the first round are eligible for the second round of voting. The candidate that gets more votes in the second round is declared the winner, regardless of voter turnout.

Council seats (other than the seat of the mayor) are allocated to the participating political parties proportionally to the share of vote received. Parties receiving less than 4% of the vote and joint multi-party electoral lists receiving less than 6% of the vote are not eligible to receive any seats, unless the remaining eligible parties received less than 60% of the vote.

Candidates take the seats allocated to their parties based on the preference lists submitted before the election. The preference lists are adjusted by preference votes given by the voters.

=== Elections and results ===
Election	Turnout, %	Total mandates	Largest party		2nd largest party		3rd largest party		Source
Election	Turnout, %	Total mandates		Seats		Seats		Seats	Source
1995	44.85	1488	Homeland Union - Lithuanian Conservatives	428	Democratic Labour Party of Lithuania	297	Lithuanian Christian Democratic Party	247	
1997	35.60 (Note: Only includes turnout by 19:00 on election day, does not include votes by post or early voting)	1459	Homeland Union - Lithuanian Conservatives	493	Democratic Labour Party of Lithuania	212	Lithuanian Christian Democratic Party	180	
2000	49.63	1562	New Union (Social Liberals)	270	Lithuanian Peasant Union	209	Homeland Union - Lithuanian Conservatives	199	
2002	49.23	1560	Social Democratic Party of Lithuania	332	Homeland Union - Lithuanian Conservatives	193	Union of Peasant and New Democracy Parties	190	
2007	41.30	1550	Social Democratic Party of Lithuania	302	Homeland Union - Conservatives, Political Prisoners and Deportees, Christian Democrats	256	Liberal and Centre Union	182	
2011	44.08	1550	Social Democratic Party of Lithuania	328	Homeland Union - Lithuanian Christian Democrats	249	Labour Party	165	

Direct elections for mayor were introduced in 2015.

Election	Turnout, %	Total mandates	Mayor mandates	Largest party			2nd largest party			3rd largest party			Source
Election	Turnout, %	Total mandates	Mayor mandates		Total seats	Mayors		Total seats	Mayors		Total seats	Mayors	Source
2015	47.18	1523	59	Social Democratic Party of Lithuania	372	16	Homeland Union - Lithuanian Christian Democrats	258	11	Liberal Movement	225	9	
2019	47.90	1502	60	Public election committees	317	12	Social Democratic Party of Lithuania	274	15	Homeland Union - Lithuanian Christian Democrats	274	11	
2023	48.93	1558	60	Social Democratic Party of Lithuania	375	17	Homeland Union - Lithuanian Christian Democrats	244	5	Public election committees	194	11	

2025 Panevėžys City as well as Joniškis district mayoral elections are to be held.

== European elections ==
=== Election process and eligibility ===
Lithuania joined the European Union in 2004. In the same year, the first election took place for 13 seats in the European Parliament allocated to Lithuania. As of 2014, the number of seats allocated to Lithuania was 11, down from 12 in 2009. Members of the parliament are elected by proportional representation for a five-year term.

Ordinary elections take place on a Sunday on the same day as in other EU countries. Early voting is available during Wednesday and Thursday before the election. Mail-in voting and at-home voting is available for eligible voters. The vote is open to all citizens of Lithuania, as well as citizens of other EU countries that permanently reside in Lithuania, who are at least 18 years old on the election day.

To be eligible for election, candidates must be at least 21 years old on the election day, citizen of Lithuania or citizen of another EU country permanently residing in Lithuania. Candidates are not allowed to stand for election in more than one country. Persons serving or due to serve a sentence imposed by the court 65 days before the election are not eligible. Also, judges, citizens performing military service, and servicemen of professional military service and officials of statutory institutions and establishments may not stand for election.

The seats are allocated to the participating political parties or lists proportionally to the share of vote received. Parties or lists receiving less than 5% of the vote are not eligible to receive any seats, unless the remaining eligible parties received less than 60% of the vote.

Candidates take the seats allocated to their parties based on the preference lists submitted before the election. The preference lists are adjusted by preference votes given by the voters.

=== Elections and results ===
Five elections to the European Parliament have taken place in Lithuania.

The election in 2004 took place on 13 June 2004, together with the second round of the presidential election, resulting in a relatively high turnout of 48%. As with later elections, the election campaign in 2004 centered around domestic issues and not European policies, and populist parties featured prominently. The election was a disappointment for the governing Social Democrats, who received only 2 of the 13 seats, and their partners in the government, New Union (Social Liberals), who failed to win a seat. The biggest winners in the election were the populist Labor Party, who contested their first national election and walked away with 5 seats in the European Parliament.

The election in 2009 took place on 7 June 2009. The onset of the financial crisis after years of economic growth led to economic and social security issues dominating the election agenda, despite the limited influence the European Parliament has over the economy of Lithuania. The election took place just three weeks after the presidential election and achieved a voter turnout of only 21% - the lowest turnout in any elections in post-communist Lithuania and one of the lowest in Europe. The election was a success for the governing Homeland Union, which increased its share of vote to more than 26%, up from 19.7% in the parliamentary election six months before. Homeland Union won 4 seats in the European Parliament, compared to 3 achieved by opposition Social Democrats.

The election in 2014 took place on 25 May 2014. In a close election, governing Social Democrats and Order and Justice parties, as well as opposition Homeland Union and Liberal Movement won two seats each, with Homeland Union getting the highest share of the vote - 17.43%. The election was held together with the run-off of the presidential election, leading to a turnout of over 47%.

The election in 2019 took place on 26 May 2019. The Homeland Union and the Social Democratic Party, both in the opposition, won the most votes, securing 19.74% of the vote (3 seats) and 15.88% (2 seats) respectively. The ruling Peasant and Greens Union also won 2 seats, although its coalition partners—Order and Justice and the Social Democratic Labour Party—failed to earn any seats. The turnout was high at 53.48% because the vote was held in concert with the presidential election.

The election in 2024 took place on 9 June 2024. The ruling Homeland Union and opposition Social Democrats retained their allocations of three and two seats respectively, while six other parties secured one seat apiece. Voter turnout declined to 28.94%. Analysts attributed the low turnout to the fact that the 2024 presidential election was held separately, among other potential causes, and noted that the decline in voter participation likely helped the Homeland Union.

Political party/list	Election									
Political party/list	2004		2009		2014		2019		2024	
Political party/list	Seats	% of votes	Seats	% of votes	Seats	% of votes	Seats	% of votes	Seats	% of votes
Labour Party	5	30.16	1	8.56	1	12.38	1	8.99	-	1.66
Social Democratic Party of Lithuania	2	14.43	3	18.12	2	17.26	2	15.88	2	17.98
Homeland Union - Lithuanian Christian Democrats	2	12.58	4	26.16	2	17.43	3	19.74	3	21.33
Liberal and Centre Union	2	11.23	-	3.38	-	1.48	-	-	-	-
Lithuanian Peasant and Greens Union	1	7.41	-	1.82	1	6.61	2	12.56	1	9.13
Electoral Action of Poles in Lithuania	-	5.71	1	8.20	1	8.05	1	5.50	1	5.78
Order and Justice (Note: The party ran in the 2004 European Parliament election under its former name 'Liberal Democratic Party'.)	1	6.83	2	11.90	2	14.25	-	2.73	-	-
Liberal Movement	-	-	1	7.17	2	16.55	1	6.59	1	5.42
People and Justice Union (Note: The party also ran in European Parliament elections under its former name 'Lithuanian Centre Party'.)	-	0.30	-	3.09	-	-	-	5.13	1	5.45
Freedom Party	-	-	-	-	-	-	-	-	1	8.10
Union of Democrats "For Lithuania"	-	-	-	-	-	-	-	-	1	5.95
Elected independents	-	-	-	-	-	-	1	6.51	-	-
Total seats	13		12		11		11		11	
Voter Turnout	48.32%		20.98%		47.35%		53.48%		28.94%	

== Referendums ==
Two types of referendums can take place in Lithuania: mandatory referendums and consultative (advisory) referendums.

Mandatory referendums must be held on these questions:

1. to amend Chapters I (The State of Lithuania) and XIV (Amending the Constitution) of the Constitution of Lithuania
2. to amend the June 8, 1992 Constitutional Act, "On Non-Alignment of the Republic of Lithuania to Post-Soviet Eastern Alliances"
3. to approve participation in international organizations if membership requires partial transfer of powers from state institutions

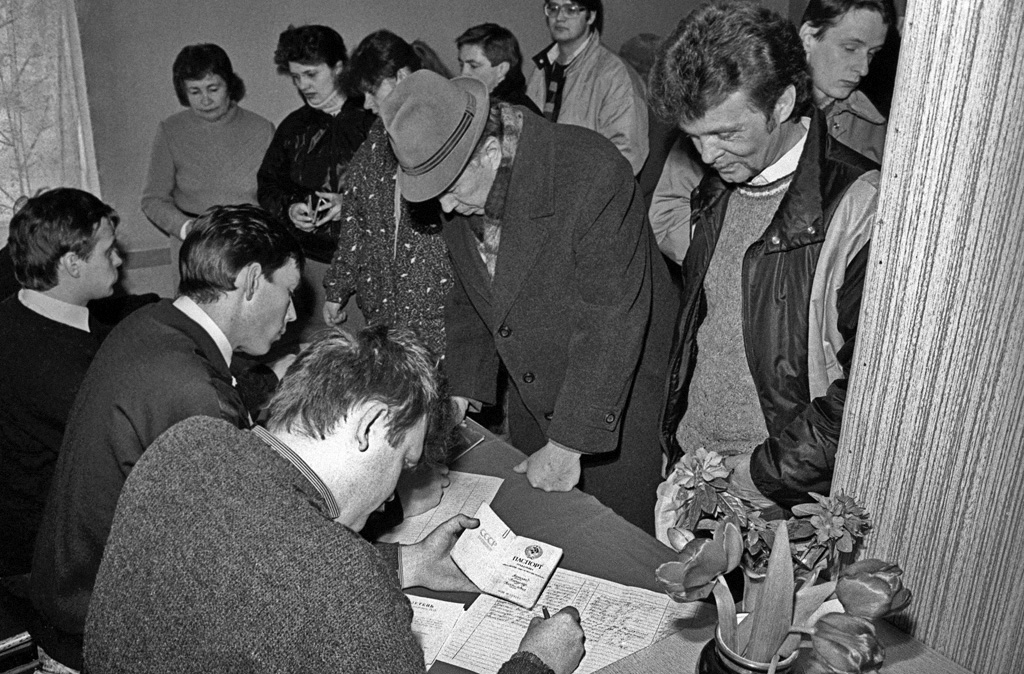
A polling station in Lithuania on the 1991 Referendum day.

Mandatory and consultative referendums can also be held on any other question if the proposal to hold the referendum is supported by at least 300,000 voters or the referendum is called by at least one quarter of all members of the parliament.

The referendum is deemed to have taken place if more than half of the registered voters participate.

The referendum question in a mandatory referendum is adopted if approved by more than half of all citizens participating in the referendum but no less than 1/3 of all citizens registered to vote. The following exceptions exist:

- The provision of Article 1 of the Constitution ("The State of Lithuania is an independent, democratic Republic"), and the Constitutional Act of June 8, 1992 can only be amended upon approval of at least 3/4 of all citizens registered to vote.
- Chapters I and XIV of the Constitution can only be amended upon approval of at least half of all citizens registered to vote.
- Questions regarding participation in international organizations are adopted if approved by more than half of voters participating in the referendum.

Questions in a consultative referendum are approved if supported by more than half of all citizens participating in the referendum. The parliament should then agree on the implementation of the question within one month. The parliament may still take into account the results of a consultative referendum even if it is invalid due to low participation.

A total of 15 separate referendums have been organized in Lithuania (some of them with several referendum questions). Of these, four have seen the referendum question approved in a referendum deemed to have taken place. In February 1991, Lithuanian voter approved the independence of Lithuania from Soviet Union with 90.2% of voters participating (76.5% of voters eligible) voting in favor. In June 1992, the voters demanded through referendum an immediate withdrawal of Russian troops and compensation for damages from the Soviet Union. In October 1992 the Lithuanian Constitution was approved. In 2003, the Lithuanian membership in the European Union was approved 90% of participating voters (57% of all eligible voters).

== Voting process ==
=== Voters and voter lists ===
The minimum voting age in Lithuania is 18. Voting in elections for the parliament and the president, as well as participation in referendums is open to citizens of Lithuania. Voting in elections to the European Parliament is open to citizens of Lithuania, as well as citizens of other EU countries permanently residing in Lithuania, as long as they only vote in one country. Voting in local elections is limited to permanent residents of the respective municipalities, regardless of citizenship. Individuals who have been declared mentally incompetent by court are barred from voting.

Voter lists or electoral rolls are compiled before each vote by the Central Electoral Commission. The electoral rolls should include every person eligible to vote, and include information about the person necessary to establish eligibility, such as name, surname, personal number, date of birth, passport or other ID number, as well as place of residence. The electoral roll of the Republic of Lithuania then forms the basis for electoral rolls of single-member constituencies and polling districts, that contain information necessary for individuals to vote. Electoral rolls are not public but voters may access information related to themselves in the electoral roll.

Before the election, a poll card is sent to each voter, representing an invitation to vote. It may also be accessed and printed online.

Citizens of Lithuania who do not reside in Lithuania but are entitled to vote, for example in the elections for the parliament, are entered in electoral rolls for the constituency in the territory where the parliament is situated. Voters who are aboard a ship and will not be able to return to Lithuania to vote, are entered on the electoral roll of the polling district on whose electoral roll the ship’s crew is entered. Voters who are in a penal institution and have not declared a place of residence, are entered on the electoral roll of the polling district where the penal institution is situated.

=== Candidates ===
The eligibility criteria for candidates varies depending on the election type and is covered more thoroughly above.

Parties and public election committees file the application and place the election deposits for their candidates in multi-seat and single-seat constituencies with the Central Electoral Commission, including providing all necessary additional information, such as tax returns. Individual candidates who nominate themselves file the application and place the deposits with the electoral commission of the constituency where they stand for election. The names of candidates and party lists are announced 30 days before the election.

Upon announcement, the candidates in constituencies have equal rights to speak at voters' meetings or any other meetings, gatherings, conferences as well as through the state mass media, and to announce their respective election programmes. In addition, a candidate for the parliament gains immunity and may not be arrested without the consent of the Central Electoral Commission.

=== Election campaigns ===
Candidates have a right to campaign in fair manner and can be granted the right to use the Lithuanian National Radio and Television free of charge. The Central Electoral Commission distributes the time of the broadcasts in such a manner that the principle of equality is preserved. Debates on radio and television are financed by the state. Election programmes are published by the Central Electoral Commission for country-wide parties and candidates and the electoral committee of that constituency or municipality for local candidates.

Political advertising is prohibited on the buildings of state administration, law-enforcement and other state and municipal institutions and establishments, vehicles belonging to state or municipal enterprises, motorways, streets and along them if it might interfere with traffic safety, sculptures and monuments. Outdoor advertising is prohibited within 50 meters around the building which houses a polling station.

It is prohibited for candidates to take advantage of his or her official position in state or municipal institutions, establishments or organizations, as well as in the state or municipal mass media for any form of election campaign.

Any campaigning is prohibited 30 hours before the beginning of an election and on the election day until the closing of the polls, with the exception of permanent visual election campaign material, provided that it was displayed at least 48 hours prior to the beginning of the election.

Financing of political campaigns of elections is regulated by the Law on Financing of Political Parties and Political Campaigns.

=== Organization ===
Elections are organized and supervised by

1. the Central Electoral Commission;
2. constituency or municipal electoral committees; and
3. polling district committees.

Central Electoral Commission has the overall responsibility for organizing elections and referendums. Central Electoral Commission is also, together with other institutions, responsible for monitoring the financing of political parties and campaigns.

The constituency or municipal electoral committees supervise local implementation of the elections and their compliance with law, form polling district committees, control expenditure of the polling district committees, register election observers, monitor voting by post, voting at health care institutions, military units, penal institutions, as well as organize early voting. Constituency or municipal electoral committees also monitor political advertising. The polling district committees provide conditions for voters to familiarize themselves with electoral lists, deliver poll cards to voters, investigate complaints about the errors made in electoral rolls, monitor postal voting, organize voting at home, prepare polling stations, organize voting on the election day, count votes and consider complaints from voters and observers. Members of the committees are remunerated for their work by the state.

During nationwide elections, around 16,000 people work in electoral commissions.

=== Voting location and timing ===
The polls are held on the election day from 7:00 a.m. until 8:00 p.m. in the place designated by the electoral committee of the polling district. With few exceptions, voters cast their ballot in their registered polling district.

At the entrance to the polling station, voters present their passports or other identity documents to an electoral committee member of the polling district. It is noted in the electronic electoral roll, electronically, where possible, that a voter has arrived to vote. The voter is handed an arrival card that allows to apply for a ballot. Voting takes place in voting booths, in secret, with the votes submitted to the ballot boxes.

Postal voting is open to voters who are in healthcare institutions, social care or guardianship because of their health condition or age, who perform mandatory military service, who perform active military service, civil service or work under contract in international military operations abroad, or who are in detention facilities. Postal voting is possible at specific post offices on a last Wednesday, Thursday or Friday before an election day.

Voting at home is available upon request to disabled voters, voters with temporary working incapacity, voters aged 70 and over if because of the health condition they are unable to come to a polling district to vote on an election day. Voters performing mandatory military service are entitled to vote in the military units where they serve. Voters who serve arrest or imprisonment sentence are entitled to vote in they institution they serve a sentence in.

Voting is available, except for municipal elections, in diplomatic missions, consular posts and on ships of the Republic of Lithuania.

Early voting takes place from 8 am to 8 pm on the Wednesday and Thursday preceding an election day for voters who are unable to vote on the election day. Voting takes place in the building where the mayor of the municipality in question works.

=== Counting votes and appeals ===
Before the end of voting, appeals against the decisions of polling district committees may be filed with the constituency or municipal electoral committee. Decisions of municipal electoral committees may be appealed to the Central Electoral Commission. Decisions of the Central Electoral Commission may be appealed to the Supreme Administrative Court of Lithuania. Appeals must be considered within 48 hours. The decision of the Supreme Administrative Court of Lithuania shall become effective from its pronouncement.

The votes are counted by the polling district electoral committees. Vote tallies are submitted to constituency or municipal electoral committee, which checks the documents and seals for completeness and consistency, considers outstanding complaints and provides the information to the Central Electoral Commission.

The election observers and representatives of the media may participate in the counting of votes in polling districts and constituencies or municipalities, and also in the establishment of election results. Observers shall have the right to make remarks and claims to the electoral committees concerning violations of laws, but may not hinder the work of electoral committees. Observers can make written protests to the polling district committee, which is appended to the vote counting record of the polling district and delivered to the constituency electoral committee.

Preliminary election results are proclaimed by the Central Electoral Commission on the Internet.

Parties, candidates and their representatives, and election observers may appeal against the decisions of polling district electoral committees concerning the drawing up of vote counting records to the constituency electoral committee within 24 hours of their drawing up. These complaints must be investigated no later than within 24 hours. The decisions of the constituency electoral committee concerning vote counting records may be appealed to the Central Electoral Commission within 72 hours following their drawing up and must be considered before the official announcement of election results. In case of elections to the Seimas, Parties and candidates may appeal the decisions of the Central Electoral Commission within 24 hours of the official announcement of the election results, to the Parliament or the President. In such cases, the Seimas or President shall, within 48 hours, appeal to the Constitutional Court with the inquiry concerning the violation of election laws. In case of municipal elections, Parties and candidates may appeal the decisions of the Central Electoral Commission within 5 days of the decision, to the Supreme Administrative Court of Lithuania, which must consider the case within 5 days. In case of presidential elections, appeals against the decisions of the Central Electoral Commission must be filed, within two days of the decision, to the Supreme Administrative Court of Lithuania, which must consider it within 48 hours.

While investigating complaints, constituency electoral committees or Central Electoral Commission may recount ballot papers, and, in the event of discrepancies, draw up an additional vote counting record of the polling district and attach it to the vote counting record of the polling district.

The Central Electoral Commission may declare the election results in a municipality or constituency null and void if it has established that severe violations have occurred and reliable results cannot be determined.

The Central Electoral Commission shall proclaim the final election results on its website no later than within 7 days following the election and any run-off voting.

The Seimas and the President may appeal to the Constitutional Court with the inquiry whether election laws for elections to the Seimas or the President have been violated. The Constitutional Court shall investigate and evaluate the decisions of the Central Electoral Commission within 72 hours. The Seimas may then declare the elections invalid or establish real election results if records are available.

=== Monitoring and assessment ===
Elections in Lithuania have been assessed as generally free and fair by domestic and international monitors, although voting irregularities and allegations of vote-buying have occurred, although OSCE highlight the overly broad interpretation of a definition of vote-buying as a possible explanation of the scale of allegations.

Parties and candidates have the right to appoint election observers to each polling district. Observers have the right to observe elections, monitor voting and demand adherence to the election laws. 15-20 thousand observers observe the elections. A citizen initiative "white gloves" (Lithuanian: "baltosios pirštinės") was formed after the allegations of vote-buying in the 2012 election to Seimas and provide additional monitoring and reporting.

== See also ==
- Electoral calendar
- Electoral system
- Lithuanian By-Elections
