= Kubilius Cabinet II =

- 2008–2012
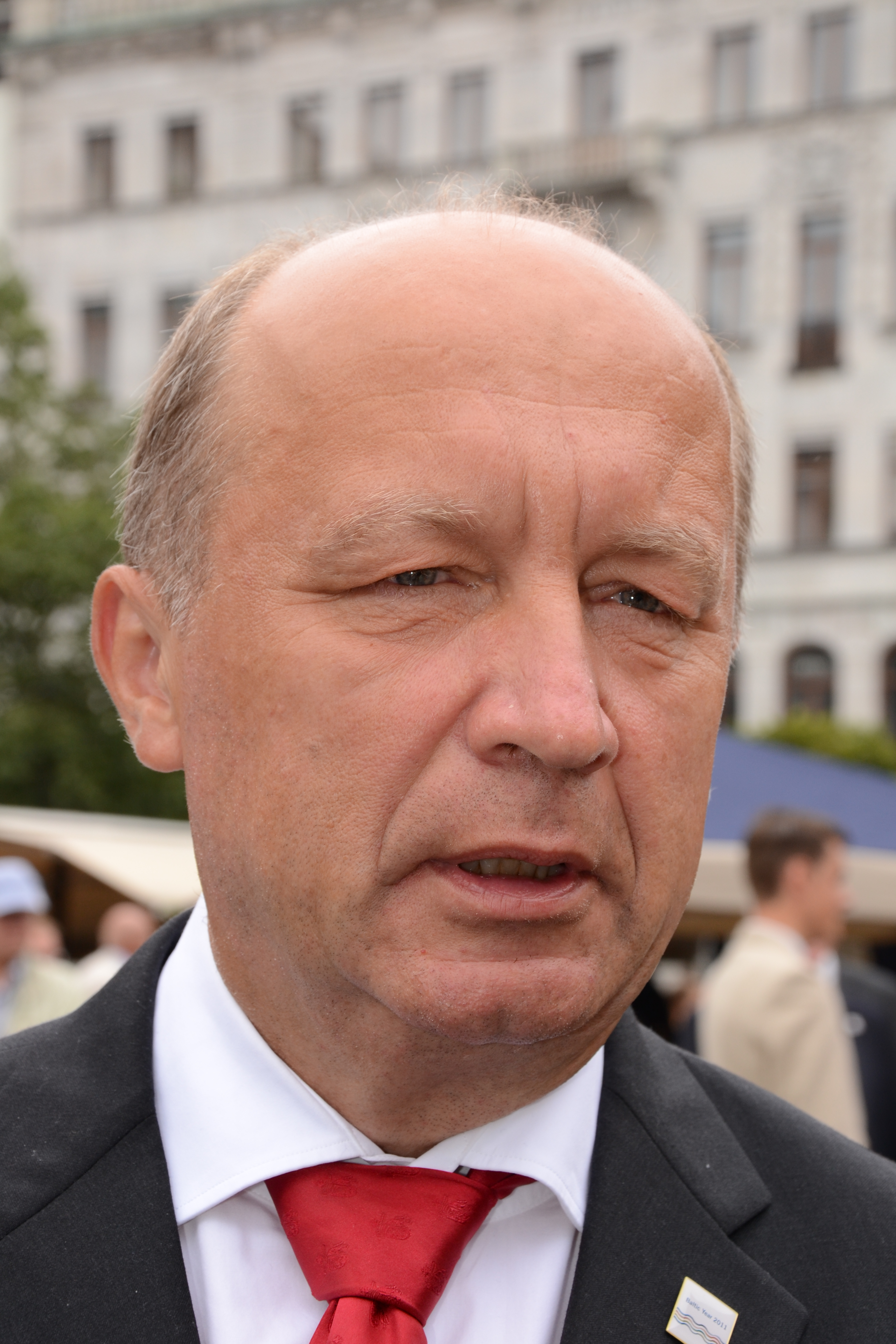
- Date formed: 9 December 2008
- Date dissolved: 13 December 2012

People and organisations
- Head of state: Valdas Adamkus (2008–2009); Dalia Grybauskaitė (2009–2012)
- Head of government: Andrius Kubilius
- Member parties: Homeland Union – Lithuanian Christian Democrats; National Resurrection Party; Liberal Movement; Liberal and Centre Union parliamentary group "One Lithuania" (2009–2010)
- Status in legislature: Majority coalition government (2008–2010 and 2010–2012); Minority (2010) and (2012) supported by Lithuanian Peasants Popular Union (2010)
- Opposition parties: Social Democratic Party of Lithuania; Order and Justice; Labour Party; Mixed Group (Lithuanian Peasants Popular Union) (2009–2010); Christian Party (2010–2012)
- Opposition leader: Gediminas Kirkilas (2008–2009), Valentinas Mazuronis (2009–2010; 2011–2012), Vytautas Gapšys (2010, 2011, 2012), Algirdas Butkevičius (2010–2011; 2012)

History
- Election: 2008
- Legislature term: Tenth Seimas
- Predecessor: Kirkilas Cabinet
- Successor: Butkevičius Cabinet

The Second Kubilius Cabinet was the 15th cabinet of Lithuania since 1990. It consisted of the Prime Minister and 13 government ministers (14 after the Ministry of Energy was re-established in 2009). The coalition consisted of the Homeland Union, National Resurrection Party (which suffered a split with both factions leaving the coalition by 2010), Liberal Movement, and the Liberal and Centre Union (which was later joined by a faction of the National Resurrection Party).

== History ==
After the parliamentary elections in October, President Valdas Adamkus appointed Andrius Kubilius, the leader of the Homeland Union, as the Prime Minister on 28 November 2008. Kubilius had previously headed the 10th cabinet between 1999 and 2000. The 15th cabinet received its mandate and started its work on 9 December 2008, after the Seimas gave assent to its program.

The coalition, which formed on 17 November 2008 and supported the government named itself the "Coalition of Change".

In first two months of 2010 National Resurrection Party dissenters formed the new Christian Party. By this time, the government lost its majority and had to rely on support from the Lithuanian Peasants Popular Union, which lasted up until October of the same year, when the coalition once again got a majority. In September 2011 the National Resurrection Party merged with the Liberal and Centre Union, which reduced the number of parties in the coalition from four to three. By April 2012 the government once again lost its majority in the Seimas.

Despite an economic crisis and the unpopular austerity measures that the government implemented to face it, the cabinet became the first government of Lithuania since independence to serve the full four-year term of the Tenth Seimas, returning its mandate on 16 November 2012 after the elections to the Seimas in October. The government continued to serve in an acting capacity until the Butkevičius Cabinet started its work on 13 December 2012.

== Cabinet ==
The following ministers served on Kubilius Cabinet.

Position	Name	Party	From	To
Prime Minister	Andrius Kubilius	Homeland Union	9 December 2008	13 December 2012
Ministry of Agriculture	Kazimieras Starkevičius	Homeland Union	9 December 2008	13 December 2012
Ministry of Culture	Remigijus Vilkaitis	National Resurrection Party	9 December 2008	1 July 2010
Ministry of Culture	Arūnas Gelūnas	Independent (endorsed by TPP)	2 July 2010	13 December 2012
Ministry of Economy	Dainius Kreivys	Homeland Union	9 December 2008	17 March 2011
Ministry of Economy	Rimantas Žylius	Independent (endorsed by TS-LKD)	17 March 2011	13 December 2012
Ministry of Education and Science	Gintaras Steponavičius	Liberal Movement	9 December 2008	13 December 2012
Ministry of Energy	Arvydas Sekmokas	Independent (endorsed by TS-LKD)	10 February 2009	13 December 2012
Ministry of Environment	Gediminas Kazlauskas	Independent (endorsed by TPP)	9 December 2008	13 December 2012
Ministry of Finance	Algirdas Šemeta	Independent (endorsed by TS-LKD)	9 December 2008	30 June 2009
Ministry of Finance	Ingrida Šimonytė	Independent (endorsed by TS-LKD)	3 July 2009	13 December 2012
Ministry of Foreign Affairs	Vygaudas Ušackas	Independent (endorsed by TS-LKD)	9 December 2008	26 January 2010
Ministry of Foreign Affairs	Audronius Ažubalis	Homeland Union	29 January 2010	13 December 2012
Ministry of Health	Algis Čaplikas	Liberal and Centre Union	9 December 2008	22 February 2010
Ministry of Health	Raimondas Šukys	Liberal and Centre Union	1 March 2010	13 December 2012
Ministry of the Interior	Raimundas Palaitis	Liberal and Centre Union	9 December 2008	26 March 2012
Ministry of the Interior	Artūras Melianas	Liberal and Centre Union	16 April 2012	13 December 2012
Ministry of Justice	Remigijus Šimašius	Liberal Movement	9 December 2008	13 December 2012
Ministry of Defence	Rasa Juknevičienė	Homeland Union	9 December 2008	13 December 2012
Ministry of Social Security and Labour	Rimantas Dagys	Homeland Union	9 December 2008	22 July 2009
Ministry of Social Security and Labour	Donatas Jankauskas	Homeland Union	22 July 2009	13 December 2012
Ministry of Transport and Communications	Eligijus Masiulis	Liberal Movement	9 December 2008	13 December 2012
