= 2008 Lithuanian parliamentary election =

← 2004	12 October 2008 (first round); 26 October 2008 (second round)	2012 →
- All 141 seats in the Seimas; 71 seats needed for a majority
- Turnout: 48.59% (▲2.51pp)
Party	Leader	Vote %	Seats	+/–
TS–LKD	Andrius Kubilius	19.72	45	+20
TPP	Arūnas Valinskas	15.09	16	New
TT	Rolandas Paksas	12.68	15	+5
LSDP	Gediminas Kirkilas	11.72	25	+5
DP–Youth	Viktor Uspaskich	8.99	10	−29
LS	Eligijus Masiulis	5.73	11	New
LiCS	Artūras Zuokas	5.34	8	−10
LLRA	Valdemar Tomaševski	4.79	3	+1
LVLS	Kazimira Prunskienė	3.73	3	−7
NS	Algirdas Monkevičius	3.64	1	−10
Independents	–	–	4	−2
This lists parties that won seats. See the complete results below.
Prime Minister before	Prime Minister after
Gediminas Kirkilas; LSDP	Andrius Kubilius; TS–LKD

Parliamentary elections were held in Lithuania on 12 October 2008, with a second round on 26 October in the constituencies where no candidate won a majority in the first round of voting. All 141 seats in the Seimas were up for election; 71 in single-seat constituencies elected by majority vote and the remaining 70 in a nationwide constituency based on proportional representation. Together with the elections, a referendum on extending the operation of Ignalina Nuclear Power Plant was held.

The elections were won by a centre-right coalition, led by Andrius Kubilius of the Homeland Union. Kubilius was appointed the Prime Minister of a coalition government together with National Resurrection Party, Liberal and Centre Union, and Liberal Movement. The coalition had 80 seats in the 141-member Tenth Seimas.

The parties that were part of coalition governments in the outgoing parliament suffered in the elections, with Social Democratic Party of Lithuania, Labour Party, New Union (Social Liberals), Liberal and Centre Union and Lithuanian Peasant Popular Union all losing seats in the Seimas, although Social Democrats increased their seat tally compared to the previous elections.

The elections were the first parliamentary elections since 1990 where no changes to the electoral law were implemented prior to the election, with the electoral system used for the 2004 elections being maintained.

== Background ==
The 2004 parliamentary elections were held on 10 October 2004, with the run-off on 24 October. The Labour Party ended up as the largest party in the parliament, with 39 seats in the 141-member Ninth Seimas.

The joint list consisting of the Social Democratic Party of Lithuania (20 seats) and New Union (Social Liberals) (11 seats) finished as runners-up, but the Social Democrats managed to form a coalition government with their leader, Algirdas Brazauskas, as the Prime Minister. The government also included the New Union, the Labour Party and the Peasants and New Democratic Party Union.

The coalition did not last the full term – New Union and Labour Party left it in spring, 2006, bringing down the government of Brazauskas, who resigned and retired from politics. Gediminas Kirkilas became the new Prime Minister and the coalition (this time composed only by Social Democrats and Lithuanian Popular Peasants Union) was joined by the Civic Democratic Party (which had splintered from the Labour Party earlier in the year) and the Liberal and Centre Union. The new coalition governed in minority, with the support from opposition parties. New Union rejoined the coalition in January 2008. At the end of the term, Social Democrats were the largest parliamentary group with 38 members.

In 2007 Lithuanian municipal election Homeland Union won 17.1 per cent of the vote and thus it became the most supported party in Lithuania since 1997 Lithuanian municipal election. Homeland Union and the Order and Justice were seen as frontrunners for future parliamentary election.

== Electoral system ==
All seats in the 141-member Seimas were up for election in parallel voting, with 71 members elected in single-seat constituencies and 70 members elected by proportional representation in a single nationwide constituency. Voting in the elections was open to all citizens of Lithuania who are at least 18-years-old.

The first round took place on 12 October 2008. Members of the Seimas in the 71 single-seat constituencies were elected by a majority vote, with a run-off held on 26 October. The remaining 70 seats were allocated to the participating political parties using the largest remainder method, with a 5% threshold (7% for multi-party lists) to enter the parliament. Candidates took the seats allocated to their parties based on the preference lists submitted before the elections and adjusted by preference votes given by the voters.

To be eligible for election, candidates had to be at least 25-years-old on the election day, not under allegiance to a foreign state and permanently resident in Lithuania. Persons serving or due to serve a sentence imposed by the court 65 days before the elections were not eligible. Also, judges, citizens performing military service, and servicemen of professional military service and officials of statutory institutions and establishments could not stand for election.

== Politicians not standing ==
- Gintautas Mikolaitis (LSDP)

== Campaign ==
The election campaign in 2008 took place in the context of overheating economy and high inflation. Following years of breakneck economic growth, the GDP was expected to shrink the following year. Inflation in 2006 exceeded the benchmark levels that would have allowed the country to adopt euro as a currency and continued rising, exceeding 12% in 2008. Economy, inflation and the adoption of the euro were high on the campaign agenda. In addition, energy security featured prominently, with the referendum on continued operation of Ignalina nuclear power plant was to take place with the elections.

Pre-election polls suggested that five parties would reach the 5% vote threshold to win proportionally-allocated seats in the Seimas: Homeland Union, Order and Justice, Labour Party, Social Democratic Party of Lithuania and Lithuanian Peasant Popular Union. Political advertisements on TV were banned before the elections, to reduce the influence of money in the elections, which contributed to a dull election campaign.

Homeland Union was hoping to return to power for the first time since 2000. Its leader Andrius Kubilius promised that his government would cut income taxes (paid for by introducing a property tax), review VAT exemptions and introduce euro at an unspecified time. Homeland Union was critical of the decision to hold a referendum regarding the Ignalina power plant, but promised to negotiate with the European Commission to postpone its closure. Homeland Union performed well in the municipal elections in 2007 and was hoping to further expand its electorate by actively campaigning on social media.

Order and Justice, led by former president Rolandas Paksas, campaigned for change, arguing that there was little difference between the two largest parties, Homeland Union and Social Democrats. Paksas promised to hold a referendum whether to adopt the euro and to maintain a pragmatic relationship with Russia.

The Labour Party had experienced upheaval since an investigation in its party finances, and its leader Viktor Uspaskich had been defeated in a bi-election. Labour campaigned on the platform of protecting small and medium enterprises in Lithuania. The party relied on its support in small towns of Lithuania.

The Social Democrats, having led the government since 2001, were hoping to continue its run, with Prime Minister Gediminas Kirkilas stating that "the new government cannot be formed without the Social Democrats". As part of the campaign, he once again pledged to introduce progressive taxation in Lithuania and aim to introduce the euro between 2010 and 2012. On the other hand, the party was criticized for failing to tackle important reforms during its time in power and for failing to control budget deficits in times of economic growth.

Other major contenders in the elections were the Lithuanian Peasant Popular Union, which had formed part of the government since 2004, the Liberal Movement, which enjoyed substantial support among students and businessmen, and the Liberal and Centre Union, led by former mayor of Vilnius, Artūras Zuokas. Newly formed National Resurrection Party, led by a businessman and a showman Arūnas Valinskas rose to prominence shortly before the elections, with many media personalities among its ranks.

In total, 1,583 candidates and 20 electoral lists were vying for seats in the elections.

== Results ==
Party	Proportional			Constituency (first round)			Constituency (second round)			Total seats	+/–
Party	Votes	%	Seats	Votes	%	Seats	Votes	%	Seats	Total seats	+/–
Homeland Union	243,823	19.72	18	240,408	19.57	0	283,629	35.45	27	45	+20
National Resurrection Party	186,629	15.09	13	116,728	9.50	0	44,386	5.55	3	16	New
Order and Justice	156,777	12.68	11	147,656	12.02	0	81,188	10.15	4	15	+5
Social Democratic Party of Lithuania	144,890	11.72	10	175,023	14.25	2	136,345	17.04	13	25	+5
Labour Party + Youth	111,149	8.99	8	92,185	7.51	0	27,441	3.43	2	10	–29
Liberal Movement	70,862	5.73	5	78,539	6.39	0	50,066	6.26	6	11	New
Liberal and Centre Union	66,078	5.34	5	94,585	7.70	0	56,571	7.07	3	8	–10
Electoral Action of Poles in Lithuania	59,237	4.79	0	58,883	4.79	1	29,744	3.72	2	3	+1
Lithuanian Peasant Popular Union	46,162	3.73	0	64,328	5.24	0	36,658	4.58	3	3	–7
New Union (Social Liberals)	45,061	3.64	0	54,502	4.44	0	6,585	0.82	1	1	–10
Front Party	40,016	3.24	0	38,192	3.11	0				0	New
Young Lithuania	21,589	1.75	0	7,080	0.58	0	3,366	0.42	0	0	0
Civic Democratic Party	13,775	1.11	0	8,568	0.70	0	5,264	0.66	0	0	New
Lithuanian Russian Union	11,357	0.92	0	3,654	0.30	0				0	0
Lithuanian Social Democratic Union	10,642	0.86	0	10,396	0.85	0				0	0
Lithuanian Centre Party	8,669	0.70	0	1,776	0.14	0				0	0
Lithuanian Liberty Union				1,547	0.13	0				0	0
For a Fair Lithuania				993	0.08	0				0	0
Independents				33,156	2.70	0	38,804	4.85	4	4	–1
Total	1,236,716	100.00	70	1,228,199	100.00	3	800,047	100.00	68	141	0
Valid votes	1,236,716	94.41		1,228,199	93.77		800,047	95.74			
Invalid/blank votes	73,239	5.59		81,581	6.23		35,593	4.26			
Total votes	1,309,955	100.00		1,309,780	100.00		835,640	100.00			
Registered voters/turnout	2,696,090	48.59		2,696,075	48.58		2,581,305	32.37			
Source: VRK, CLEA

== Aftermath ==
The elections were won by the Homeland Union, which won 45 of 141 seats and finished ahead of the field for the first time since the elections in 1996. The recently established National Resurrection Party finished second in the nationwide constituency (winning 13 out of 70 proportionally-allocated seats), surprising many analysts. Its success was attributed to protest votes against established political movements and the party's popularity among young people attracted to its celebrity members. However, the party performed with less success in the single-seat constituencies, winning only 3 additional seats.

Government parties performed poorly, with New Union and Peasants Popular Union even failing to clear 5% threshold for proportionally-allocated seats. Social Democrats finished fourth in the nationwide constituency, but ended up with 25 seats (only behind Homeland Union) due to a stronger performance in single-member constituencies. Social Democratic Party's leader Gediminas Kirkilas decided not to stand for leadership election in 2009.

== Government formation ==
Hours after the end of voting in the second round, the Homeland Union, the National Resurrection Party, the Liberal Movement and the Liberal and Centre Union signed a coalition agreement. The four parties had 80 of the 141 seats in the Tenth Seimas. On 27 November 2008, Andrius Kubilius was appointed the Prime Minister of the coalition government. Arūnas Valinskas of the National Resurrection Party was elected as the Speaker of the Seimas.
