= National Resurrection Party =

National Resurrection Party Tautos prisikėlimo partija
- Leader: Arūnas Valinskas
- Founded: June 30, 2008
- Dissolved: September 22, 2011
- Merged into: Liberal and Centre Union
- Headquarters: 5 Rotundo g., Vilnius
- Ideology: Populism; Conservative liberalism
- Political position: Centre-right
- Colours: Orange and black

Website
- www.prisikelimopartija.lt

The National Resurrection Party (Lithuanian: Tautos prisikėlimo partija; sometimes translated as Rising Nation Party or National Revival Party) was a short-lived political party in Lithuania. In the 2008 Lithuanian parliamentary election, it became one of the largest parties in the Tenth Seimas of Lithuania, but quickly lost popularity, disintegrated and merged with the Liberal and Centre Union in 2011.

== History ==
=== Foundation and 2008 parliamentary election ===
Arūnas Valinskas, Lithuanian producer and media personality, first announced the idea of forming a party for "resurrection" in April 2008. It was registered in June of the same year. Valinskas was elected as the leader of the party and served as the leader for the entirety of its existence.

From the beginning, the TPP was described as a "showmen's party", as many of its initial members were TV personalities and representatives of the media industry, much like Valinskas himself. Many of the figures included in the party's electoral list were personally connected to Valinskas - including his wife Inga Valinskienė, as well as the manager of his company "A. Valinsko tvenkiniai". Saulius Stoma, who later joined the party, claimed that Valinskas was connected with the Social Democratic Party of Lithuania and the Maxima Group.

At the election of 12 October 2008 to the Seimas, the party won 15.09% of the popular vote and 13 seats in the first round. However, in spite of fielding numerous media personalities known to the Lithuanian public, it only won 3 additional seats in the second round of the single-member constituency elections.

=== Kubilius Cabinet ===
Before the 2008 parliamentary election, the party announced its interest to work with any parties except the Labour Party and Order and Justice, which Valinskas described as threats to national security. However, after the election, the TPP, Homeland Union – Lithuanian Christian Democrats, the Liberal and Centre Union and the Liberal Movement joined in a centre-right "Coalition for Change" (Lithuanian: Permainų koalicija), which formed the Kubilius Cabinet II.

According to the coalition agreement, Valinskas was to be elected Speaker of the Seimas, but he was only elected after a second vote, becoming the first Speaker of the Seimas in Lithuanian history to not be elected on the first vote. As the vote was secret, it is unknown which members of the coalition protested.

The TPP nominated Vice-Mayor of Neringa Municipality Arūnas Burkšas for Minister of Environment and actor and former leader of the "Eaters of Bread" Party (Lithuanian: Duonos valgytojų partija) Remigijus Vilkaitis for Minister of Culture. While Vilkaitis was accepted, the nomination of Burkšas was highly controversial due to his approval of numerous illegal constructions in the Curonian Spit, a UNESCO World Heritage Site and a national park, and was blocked by Prime Minister Andrius Kubilius. Eventually, Gediminas Kazlauskas was nominated instead.

=== Decline and split ===
The first signs of the party's collapse came in early 2009, due to protests from the party membership over Valinskas' authoritarian leadership in the party. Valinskas stalled the adoption of a party statute, fearing that it would reduce his control of the party. Opposition within the party also criticized the arrogant attitude of Minister Remigijus Vilkaitis. Regardless, Valinskas was reelected as chairman of the party without opposition in a party conference on 15 March, which also approved a list of the party's candidates for the 2009 European Parliament elections.

Though a party statute was also approved in the conference, its registration by the Ministry of Justice was frozen, as the Liberal Movement, which controlled the ministry, allegedly sought to hasten the disintegration of TPP and bring its members to their party. Around the same time, the party drew closer to the Liberal and Centre Union and signed an agreement of parliamentary group cooperation to increase their weight in the coalition against the Homeland Union.

The internal conflict in the party and its perceived inability to govern severely impacted its ratings. In the 2009 European Parliament election in Lithuania, the party received only 1.04% of the vote and no mandates. After the election, the party considered leaving the coalition, and opponents of Valinskas gained the upper hand in the party's parliamentary group and central leadership. On 15 July, seven members of the party's parliamentary group who supported the chairman and Speaker of the Seimas, including Valinskas himself, suspended their membership and formed the "Oak" Parliamentary Group (Lithuanian: Ąžuolo frakcija).

As a result, the party's parliamentary group withdrew its confidence on its own ministers and threatened with departure from the coalition. In response, Valinskas removed four members of the TPP parliamentary group, including chairman of the group Laimontas Dinius, from the party. Dinius, in response, called for an emergency session of the party presidium on the removal of Valinskas from the party.

=== Formation of the Christian Party ===
Valinskas' decision to remove four members of the party was ignored, and they, alongside the rest of the party's parliamentary group, left the party on their own accord on 13 August. Around the same time, both Valinskas and Dinius were targeted by rumors - Dinius and the remaining TPP parliamentary group were accused of being influenced by businessman Gediminas Žiemelis, who pushed for the group to claim the Ministry of Transport and Communications to support his private interests, while Valinskas was accused of ties with "the Doctors" (Lithuanian: Daktarai), an organized crime ring in Kaunas, led by Henrikas Daktaras. In light of these rumors, President Dalia Grybauskaitė demanded Valinskas' resignation from Speaker of the Seimas.

Valinskas refused to resign, in spite of pressure from coalition partners. On 15 September, the Seimas removed him from the position with 95 members voting in favor, and 20 against. Irena Degutienė was elected as the next Speaker.

After the vote, the "Oak" Parliamentary Group adopted the name National Resurrection Party Group, whereas the former National Resurrection Party Group renamed itself to Parliamentary Group "One Lithuania" (Lithuanian: Frakcija "Viena Lietuva"). It entered the opposition and merged with the Christian Conservative Social Union and the Lithuanian Party of Christian Democracy in January 2010 to form the Christian Party.

=== Disbandment and aftermath ===
After the loss of the Christian Party deputies, the remaining members of the TPP began preparing for a merger with the Liberal and Centre Union, and formed a joint group in the Seimas. Initially, the Liberal Movement was also considered for unification, but it refused to merge with the LiCS. In April 2010, Remigijus Vilkaitis was expelled from the party and it delegated Valinskas as their candidate for Minister of Culture, but, after the candidate was criticized by the President, it delegated Arūnas Gelūnas instead.

TPP and LiCS announced their full merger on 22 September 2011, and it was completed on 10 December. A new program was drafted which affirmed commitment to responsible liberalism and the party's intent to represent a "third way" in Lithuanian politics. Some members (e. g. Rokas Žilinskas) joined the Homeland Union instead.

Almost all members of the Seimas elected on the party's list in 2008 were not reelected in the 2012 Lithuanian parliamentary election. Both the Christian Party and the Liberal and Centre Union won no seats in the election, and merged into different parties - the Christian Party merged with the Labour Party in 2013, while the Liberal and Centre Union merged with YES (itself a split from the LiCS) in 2014 and ultimately with the Order and Justice party to form Freedom and Justice in 2020.

== Political positions ==
The TPP has been described as a centre, centre-right or populist political party. Its program in the 2008 Lithuanian parliamentary election was a word play on the Ten Commandments without any commitment to policy:

1. Thou shall have no other homeland but Lithuania.
2. Thou shall spread the name of Lithuania wherever you are.
3. Thou shall enlighten the youth, because they are the future of the homeland and the nation.
4. Thou shall respect the elders, because they paved the way for you.
5. Thou shall work for the good of yourself and the homeland on weekdays.
6. Thou shall not kill, steal, ask for someone else's property, or tell lies.
7. Thou shall love each person as yourself.
8. Thou shall live healthy, because a healthy soul is in a healthy body.
9. Thou shall raise your spirit to new heights, help resurrect others.
10. Thou shall take care of the Earth, because it nourishes and is the only one that will survive you.

It has been described as a personalist party of Arūnas Valinskas, with no political positions of its own.

In 2009, the party adopted a new program, which defined it as a party of the centre that "reconciles the left-wing principle of equality and the right-wing principle of liberty". It affirmed its support for dual citizenship, returning sovereignty to the people, and free-market economics. The concluding sentences of the program invoked both God and the Kantian categorical imperative, asking for their support. During the campaign for the 2009 European Parliament election in Lithuania, the TPP expressed its opposition to further European integration, calling for a "Europe of nations", and criticized lack of transparency in the institutions of the European Union.

== Election results ==
=== Seimas ===
Election	Votes (Note: Proportional representation votes.)	%	Seats	+/–	Government
2008	186,629	15.09 (#2)	16 / 141	New	Coalition

=== European Parliament ===
Election	Votes	%	Seats	+/–
2009	5,717	1.04 (#14)	0 / 12	
