= Ramelis =

Ramelis is a surname. Notable people with the surname include:

- Konstantas Ramelis (1938–2026), Lithuanian politician
- Tomas Ramelis (born 1971), Lithuanian footballer
