= Donalda Meiželytė =

Lithuanian politician (born 1975)

Donalda Meiželytė (born 7 August 1975) is a Lithuanian politician and former television presenter who served in the Tenth Seimas of Lithuania from 2008 to 2012 for the Christian Party (Lithuania).

== Career ==
Meiželytė was a member of the Jury in the first quarterfinal of the pre-selection process in the Eurovision Song Contest 2007. She joined the Seimas in 2008.
