= 2004 Lithuanian parliamentary election =

- 10 October 2004 (first round); 24 October 2004 (second round)
- All 141 seats in the Seimas; 71 seats needed for a majority
- Turnout: 46.08% (▼12.55pp)
Party	Leader	Vote %	Seats	+/–
DP	Viktor Uspaskich	28.44	39	New
LSDP–NS	Algirdas Brazauskas	20.65	31	−41
TS	Andrius Kubilius	14.75	25	+16
TT	Rolandas Paksas	11.36	10	New
LiCS	Gintautas Babravičius	9.19	18	−21
VNDPS	Kazimira Prunskienė	6.60	10	+3
LLRA	Valdemar Tomaševski	3.79	2	0
Independents	–	–	6	+3
This lists parties that won seats. See the complete results below.
Prime Minister before	Prime Minister after
Algirdas Brazauskas; LSDP	Algirdas Brazauskas; LSDP

Parliamentary elections were held in Lithuania on 10 October 2004, with a second round on 24 October 2004 in the constituencies where no candidate won a majority in the first round of voting. All 141 seats in the Seimas were up for election; 71 in single-seat constituencies elected by majority vote and the remaining 70 in a nationwide constituency based on proportional representation.

The elections were won by the Labour Party with around 28% of the vote in the nationwide constituency and 39 seats in the Eighth Seimas, far short of the 71-seat majority. Outgoing government coalition "Working for Lithuania", consisting of the ruling Social Democratic Party of Lithuania and New Union (Social Liberals), won a total of 31 seats.

Despite finishing behind Labour, the Social Democrats led a coalition government with New Union, Labour and the Peasants and New Democratic Party Union. Algirdas Brazauskas continued as the Prime Minister of Lithuania.

== Background ==
The previous parliamentary elections were held on 8 October 2000. The Liberal Union of Lithuania emerged as the largest party in the parliament, with 34 of the 141 seats in the Eighth Seimas, followed by New Union (Social Liberals) with 29. The two parties formed a coalition government, with Rolandas Paksas of the Liberal Union as Prime Minister and Artūras Paulauskas of the New Union as Speaker.

However, the coalition was not long-lived, and at the end of June 2001, the New Union formed a new coalition government with the Social Democratic Party, with Algirdas Brazauskas as Prime Minister. In the 2000 elections, the Social-Democratic Coalition of Algirdas Brazauskas, consisting of Democratic Labour Party, the Social Democratic Party, the Union of the Russians of Lithuania and the New Democracy Party, had won 51 seats. The Democratic Labour Party and Social Democrats, which had together won 45 of those seats, merged in 2001 under the name of the latter.

Paksas, who had left the Liberal Union by the end of 2001, was elected President of Lithuania in 2003. In April 2004 he was impeached by the Seimas and removed from office, with Paulauskas serving as the acting president until elections later that year.

Lithuania became a member of the European Union on 9 May 2004. The first elections to the European Parliament took place at the same day as the presidential election. The Labour Party, which was founded in October 2003, received almost one-third of all votes in the European elections and the party was seen as the frontrunner for the parliamentary elections.

== Electoral system ==
All seats in the 141-member Seimas were up for election in parallel voting, with 71 members elected in single-seat constituencies and 70 members elected by proportional representation in a single nationwide constituency. Voting in the elections was open to all citizens of Lithuania who are at least 18-years-old. 70 seats were allocated to the participating political parties using the largest remainder method, with a 5% threshold (7% for multi-party lists) to enter the parliament. Candidates took the seats allocated to their parties based on the preference lists submitted before the elections and adjusted by preference votes given by the voters. These elections were the first ones, when positive preference votes were given in the parliamentary election (this system was introduced in 1999 for 2000 Lithuanian municipal elections and in 2003 for 2004 European Parliament election). Each voter has five preference votes at maximum.

Due to amendment in the Constitution of Lithuania in July 2004, the first round took place on 10 October 2004 (the second Sunday of October). Also, these elections were first ones with permanently set voting day (in 1992, 1996 and 2000 parliamentary elections voting date were set on initiative of Supreme Soviet or President of Republic).

In a change from the elections in 2000, members of the Seimas in the 71 single-seat constituencies were once again elected by a majority vote, with a run-off held on 24 October. Also, changes to Seimas Elections' Act were imposed to the elections in single member constituencies. Prior these changes, voting results in single member constituencies would not be declared valid if voter turnout was below 40 per cent mark (due to this, second round voting in Kaišiadorys constituency from 1993 to 1995 took place four times before member of Seimas was elected). After these changes, second round voting results would be declared valid no matter of voter turnout.

To be eligible for election, candidates had to be at least 25-years-old on the election day, not under allegiance to a foreign state and permanently resident in Lithuania. Persons serving or due to serve a sentence imposed by the court 65 days before the elections were not eligible. Also, judges, citizens performing military service, and servicemen of professional military service and officials of statutory institutions and establishments could not stand for election.

In February 2003, the Municipal Elections' Act was amended. The amendement forbade dual mandate of Seimas and municipal council membership.

In May 2004, the Constitutional Court of Lithuania decided that a person removed from office through impeachement for breaching the oath of office can not stand in parliamentary or presidential elections, or serve on the government, disqualifying Paksas from the elections.

== Politicians not standing ==
- Ramūnas Karbauskis (VNDPS)

== Campaign ==
Opinion polls suggested that Labour Party, coalition "Working for Lithuania", Homeland Union and Liberal and Centre Union would be the main contenders in the elections.

Labour Party was founded in October 2003, a year before the elections, by a Russian-born businessman and member of the Seimas Viktor Uspaskich and won the elections to the European Parliament earlier in 2004. The populist party campaigned on the promise of increasing living standards and fighting corruption. Many of its promises, such as lowering prices by 10 to 20%, increasing the minimum salary and pensions, tax holidays for newly established companies, all within less than three years, were criticized by economists as unfeasible. Nevertheless, the party garnered strong support in rural areas and small towns.

"Working for Lithuania" was the coalition of the Social Democrats (led by Prime Minister, Algirdas Brazauskas) and the New Union (led by the Speaker of the Seimas, Artūras Paulauskas) parties, which had led the government since 2001. The coalition campaigned on their record in the government and promised further economic growth, lower unemployment and increases in salaries and pensions. The prospects for electoral coalition was raised by July 2004, when the New Union (Social Liberals) failed to reach five per cent threshold in 2004 European Parliament elections. In two single-member constituencies (No. 30 (Alytus) and No. 56 (Trakai-Elektrėnai)) Julius Sabatauskas and Dangutė Mikutienė competed with Artūras Skardžius and Vytautas Petkevičius respectively, who were supported by the coalition.

Conservative Homeland Union, led by Andrius Kubilius, once again campaigned pointed to dangers posed to Lithuania by Russia. The party allied itself with the Liberal and Centre Union, led by Artūras Zuokas but headed in the elections by Petras Auštrevičius. Several members of the party, including Zuokas, had been under investigation for corruption and financial fraud.

Finally, the Liberal Democratic Party of Rolandas Paksas led a coalition "For the Order and Justice". Since Paksas was barred from participating in the elections, its electoral list was headed by Valentinas Mazuronis. Paksas had expressed hopes that the electoral list would win 50 seats in the Seimas.

Altogether, around 600 candidates competed in the single-seat constituencies, while over 1,100 candidates were included in the electoral lists for the nationwide constituency.

== Opinion polls ==
View source data.

== Results ==
Party or alliance		Proportional			Constituency (first round)			Constituency (second round)			Total seats	+/–
Party or alliance		Votes	%	Seats	Votes	%	Seats	Votes	%	Seats	Total seats	+/–
Labour Party		340,035	28.44	22	248,214	21.39	1	328,454	34.11	16	39	New
Working for Lithuania	Social Democratic Party of Lithuania	246,852	20.65	9	152,698	13.16	3	113,417	11.78	8	20	–28
Working for Lithuania	New Union (Social Liberals)	246,852	20.65	7	51,772	4.46	0	50,779	5.27	4	11	–18
Homeland Union (Lithuanian Conservatives)		176,409	14.75	11	167,220	14.41	0	168,296	17.48	14	25	+16
For Order and Justice	Liberal Democratic Party	135,807	11.36	9	81,570	7.03	0	14,962	1.55	1	10	New
For Order and Justice	For a Fair Lithuania (Note: Julius Veselka headed the For a Fair Lithuania list, but ran (and was elected) in the single-member constituencies as an independent.)	135,807	11.36	0	5,264	0.45	0				0	New
Liberal and Centre Union		109,872	9.19	7	143,658	12.38	0	133,079	13.82	11	18	New
Peasants and New Democratic Party Union		78,902	6.60	5	89,006	7.67	0	41,266	4.29	5	10	New
Electoral Action of Poles in Lithuania		45,302	3.79	0	41,805	3.60	1	20,514	2.13	1	2	0
Christian Conservative Social Union		23,426	1.96	0	21,695	1.87	0	14,836	1.54	0	0	–1
Lithuanian Christian Democrats		16,362	1.37	0	29,375	2.53	0	6,458	0.67	0	0	–2
National Centre Party		5,989	0.50	0	2,400	0.21	0				0	New
Republican Party		4,326	0.36	0	3,440	0.30	0				0	0
Lithuanian Social Democratic Union		3,977	0.33	0	9,340	0.80	0				0	0
Lithuanian Liberty Union		3,337	0.28	0	3,481	0.30	0				0	–1
National Party Lithuanian Way		2,577	0.22	0	797	0.07	0				0	New
Lithuanian Nationalist Union		2,482	0.21	0	5,904	0.51	0				0	0
Lithuanian Russian Union					13,065	1.13	0				0	–3
Lithuanian Polish People's Party					4,840	0.42	0				0	New
Young Lithuania					2,252	0.19	0				0	–1
Independents					82,703	7.13	0	70,971	7.37	6	6	+3
Total		1,195,655	100.00	70	1,160,499	100.00	5	963,032	100.00	66	141	0
Valid votes		1,195,655	97.31		1,160,499	94.53		963,032	96.20			
Invalid/blank votes		32,998	2.69		67,149	5.47		38,072	3.80			
Total votes		1,228,653	100.00		1,227,648	100.00		1,001,104	100.00			
Registered voters/turnout		2,666,196	46.08		2,666,199	46.04		2,486,750	40.26			
Source: Nohlen & Stöver, Strathclyde University, VRK

== Analysis ==
The elections were won by the Labour Party, which claimed 39 of the 141 seats in the Seimas. Nevertheless, newspaper Rzeczpospolita indicated that the result was a disappointment for the party, which had expected a better result in the second round of voting in single-seat constituencies.

Coalition "Working for Lithuania" finished second in elections, with Social Democrats and New Union winning 20 and 11 seats, respectively. Homeland Union won 25 seats, more than double their tally in the previous elections.

=== Voting irregularities ===
Several aspects of the electoral campaign and voting came under criticism. In particular, allegations of vote buying, mostly implicating the Labour Party, emerged in voting by post, prompting the Seimas to consider changes in voting procedures. Social Democrats and New Union also accused the Labour Party of violating the rules for electoral campaigns and exceeding campaign spending limits.

== Government formation ==
Several possible coalitions emerged after the elections. Homeland Union and Liberal and Centre Union indicated their willingness to join a "rainbow" coalition with the Social Democratic Party, excluding only Labour and Liberal Democrats. Labour joined forces with Peasants and New Democratic Party Union and invited Social Democratic Party to join. Brazauskas initially ruled out a coalition with Labour Party, but eventually Social Democratic Party and New Union (Social Liberals) joined forces with the Labour Party and the Peasants, with Brazauskas as the Prime Minister.
