= 2008 Lithuanian nuclear power referendum =

| 12 October 2008 |
- I support the extended operation of the Ignalina nuclear power plant for a technically safe period of time, but no longer than until the completion of a new nuclear power plant.
- Outcome: Proposal failed as less than 50% of registered voters voted in favour

Results
| Choice | Votes | % |
|---|---|---|
| Yes | 1,156,738 | 91.40% |
| No | 108,798 | 8.60% |
| Valid votes | 1,265,536 | 96.91% |
| Invalid or blank votes | 40,289 | 3.09% |
| Total votes | 1,305,825 | 100.00% |
| Registered voters/turnout | 2,696,090 | 48.43% |

A referendum on extending the operation of the Ignalina Nuclear Power Plant was held in Lithuania on 12 October 2008 alongside parliamentary elections. The country's government was obliged to close down Ignalina as part of its treaty of accession to the European Union.

The electorate were asked to vote on the statement: "I approve of the extension of operation of the Ignalina Nuclear Power Plant for a technically safe period, but not longer than completion of the construction of a new nuclear power plant."

Although 91.4% of voters voted in favour of continuing the plant's operation, voter turnout was below the 50% threshold required to make the results valid.

== Results ==
| Choice | Votes | % |
|---|---|---|
| For | 1,156,738 | 91.40 |
| Against | 108,798 | 8.60 |
| Invalid/blank votes | 40,289 | – |
| Total | 1,305,825 | 100 |
| Registered voters/turnout | 2,696,090 | 48.43 |
Source: Central Election Commission
