= Christian Party (Lithuania) =

Christian Party Krikščionių partija
- Leader: Gediminas Vagnorius
- Founded: 23 January 2010
- Dissolved: 26 October 2013
- Merger of: Christian Conservative Social Union; Lithuanian Party of Christian Democracy
- Merged into: Labour Party
- Headquarters: Odminių g. 5, Vilnius
- Ideology: Christian democracy Conservatism; Social conservatism
- Political position: Centre-right
- Colours: Green
- Seats in the Seimas: 0 / 141
- European Parliament: 0 / 12
- Municipal councils: 15 / 1,526

Website
- www.krikscioniupartija.lt

The Christian Party (Lithuanian: Krikščionių partija, KP) was a centre-right political party in Lithuania. It was led by Gediminas Vagnorius throughout its three years of existence.

== History ==
The Christian Party was founded on 23 January 2010 as a merger of the Christian Conservative Social Union (Krikščionių konservatorių socialinė sąjunga) and the Lithuanian Christian Democracy Party (Lietuvos krikščioniškosios demokratijos partija).

In 2013, during a meeting in Kėdainiai, Labour Party leader Vytautas Gapšys announced the party's merger into the Lithuanian Labour Party.

== Membership ==
The party had eight members in the Seimas. The leader, Vidmantas Žiemelis was elected for the Homeland Union – Lithuanian Christian Democrats, Jonas Ramonas for Order and Justice, and eight were elected for the National Resurrection Party: Ligitas Kernagis, Vytautas Kurpuvesas, Aleksandr Sacharuk, Jonas Stanevičius, Donalda Meiželytė Svilienė, Zita Užlytė, Mantas Varaška, and Rokas Žilinskas. However, Varaška and Žilinskas defected to the group of the Homeland Union in Spring 2011.
