= Rokas Žilinskas =

Lithuanian journalist and politician (1972–2017)

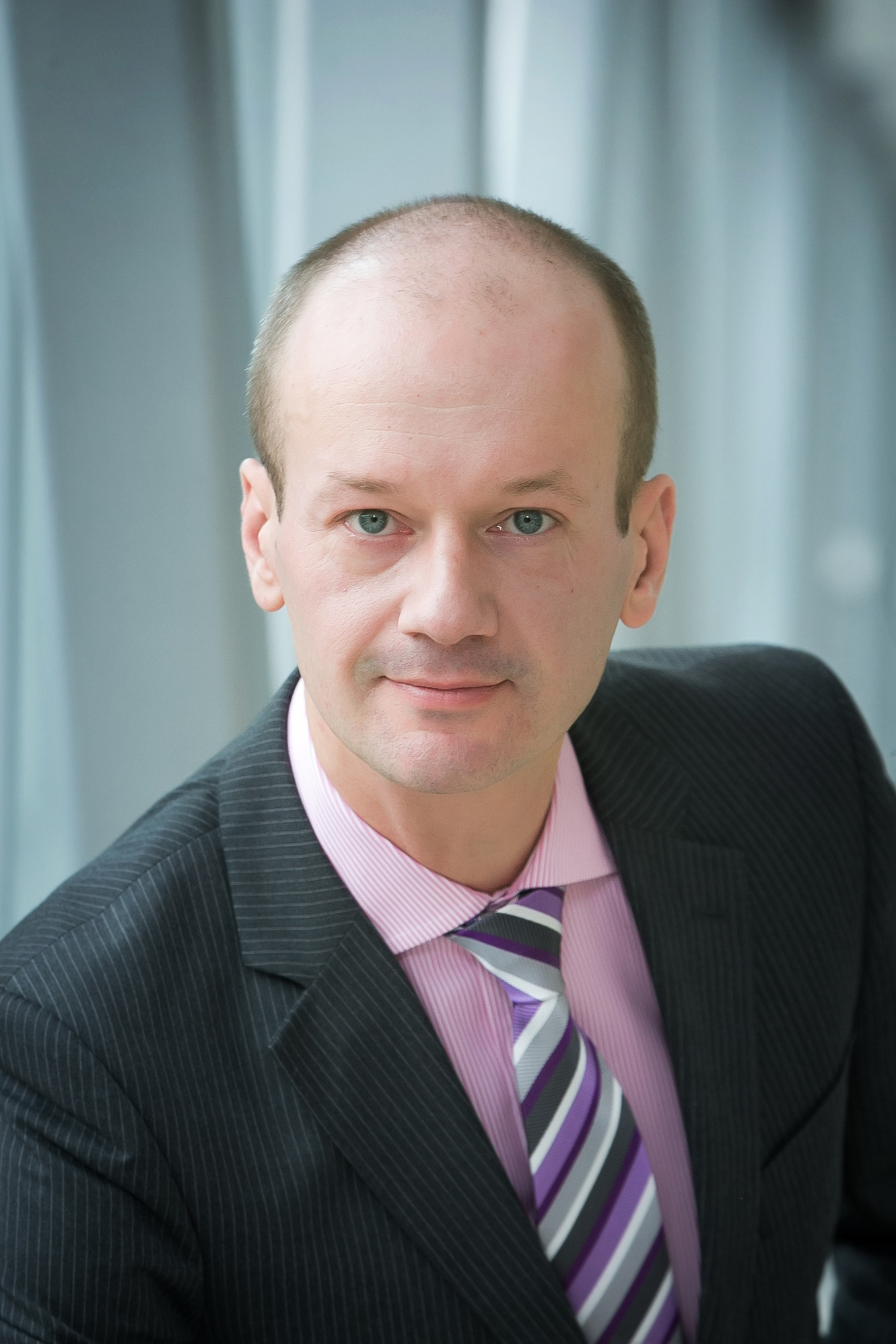

Member of the Seimas
- In office 17 November 2008 – 6 June 2017
- Succeeded by: Andrius Navickas
- Constituency: Multi–member

Personal details
- Born: 20 July 1972 Vilnius, Lithuanian SSR, USSR
- Died: 6 June 2017 (aged 44) Vilnius, Lithuania
- Party: National Resurrection Party (2008–2011); Christian Party; Homeland Union (2011–2017)
- Parent: Jūratė Žilinskienė Gediminas Žilinskas
- Education: University of Vilnius
- Profession: Journalist

Rokas Žilinskas (20 July 1972 – 6 June 2017) was a Lithuanian journalist and politician. He was elected to the Seimas in 2008 and was a member of the Lithuanian Parliament until his death. He was the first openly gay member of the parliament.

== Biography ==
Rokas Žilinskas was born to a swimming coach and a kindergarten teacher. While at school, Rokas became interested in geography, and later politology and politics. He studied journalism at the University of Vilnius. Before being elected to the Lithuanian Parliament, Rokas Žilinskas was a famous Lithuanian journalist, editor, and TV News anchor, having worked at LRT news service from 1993 to 1998 and LNK television from 1998 to 2008.

In 2009, one year after the Parliament elections, Žilinskas openly declared that he was gay, hence becoming the first elected LGBT politician in Lithuania. He, however, expressed disapproval for the equal rights for gays, such as gay marriages and gay adoption, but unexpectedly decided to participate in the first homosexual parade in Vilnius, despite being opposed to it for a long time.

Žilinskas damaged his public image after he cursed at policemen when he was under the influence of alcohol. In 2011, Žilinskas was expelled from the Christian Party, after he was noticed allegedly being drunk in Seimas.

In 2012, he became a member of the conservative Homeland Union and was re-elected to the Seimas that year as well as in 2016.

== Addiction challenges ==
Active performance and openness made MP Rokas Žilinskas a special example on Lithuania's political arena. He openly talked about his addiction problems, his path to recovery, and voluntarily helped other people that had similar problems and experiences.

He worked to balance the harm of addictions and the potential of addiction-incurring businesses to level it by contributing to education, addiction prevention, treatment, and rehabilitation.

He personally led his own working groups and contributed to the groups under Offices of the President and the Government of Lithuania to develop and introduce a socially responsible model in relations between addiction-incurring industries and businesses, and society.

== Honors and awards ==
- Charity trust fund "Mūsų krantai" Golden Cross Order 3rd Class “For the Sake of Society”;
- News website DELFI’ “Titan” “For the Most Daring Article of the Year”;
- By the Decree of the President of the Republic of Lithuania – Medal of Honor “For Personal Contribution to Lithuania’s Chairmanship of European Council in 2013”.

== Death ==
Žilinskas was hospitalized in May 2017. On 6 June 2017, Žilinskas died of pneumonia from complications of HIV at Vilnius University Santaros Clinics at age 44. He was buried in Antakalnis Cemetery in Vilnius.

== In popular culture ==
- Žilinskas was presented in a British documentary film Starsuckers, where he was interviewed.
- Žilinskas was a subject of parody by a Lithuanian humorist Justinas Jankevičius who parodied Žilinskas's TV-announcer-like way of speaking.
- Žilinskas was a subject of parody by famous Lithuanian actress Ineta Stasiulytė in the show "Pakartok". https://play.tv3.lt/pakartok-rokas-zilinskas-10170797
