= Christian Conservative Social Union =

Political party in Lithuania

Christian Conservative Social Union Krikščionių konservatorių socialinė sąjunga
- Leader: Gediminas Vagnorius
- Founded: 2004
- Dissolved: 2010
- Merged into: Christian Party
- Headquarters: Odminių g. 5, Vilnius
- Ideology: Conservatism; Christian democracy
- Political position: Centre-right

The Christian Conservative Social Union (Lithuanian: Krikščionių konservatorių socialinė sąjunga, KKSS) was a centre-right, Christian-conservative political party in Lithuania.

== History ==
The party was established as the Union of Moderate Conservatives (Nuosaikiųjų konservatorių sąjunga) in 2000 as a breakaway from the Homeland Union. Initially led by the former prime minister, Gediminas Vagnorius, it contested the 2000 elections, receiving 2% of the vote and winning a single seat.

By the 2004 elections, the party had been renamed the Christian Conservative Social Union. It received again 2% of the vote, but lost its single seat in the Seimas.

On 23 January 2010, it merged with a faction of the Lithuanian Christian Democracy Party to form the Christian Party.
