= Konstantas Ramelis =

Lithuanian politician (1938–2026)

Member of the Seimas
- In office 2008–2012

Personal details
- Born: 12 March 1938 Zarzecze, Poland (now Užupis, Lithuania)
- Died: 2 April 2026 (aged 88)
- Party: LVŽS
- Education: Vilnius University

Konstantas Ramelis (12 March 1938 – 2 April 2026) was a Lithuanian politician. A member of the Lithuanian Farmers and Greens Union, he served in the Seimas from 2008 to 2012.

Ramelis died on 2 April 2026, at the age of 88.
