= Liberal and Centre Union =

Liberal and Centre Union Liberalų ir centro sąjunga
- Leader: Artūras Melianas
- Founded: 31 May 2003
- Dissolved: 12 July 2014
- Merger of: LLS, LCS, MKDP
- Merged into: Lithuanian Freedom Union
- Headquarters: Vilniaus g. 22/1, Vilnius
- Ideology: Conservative liberalism Liberalism
- Political position: Centre-right

Website
- www.lics.lt

The Liberal and Centre Union (Lithuanian: Liberalų ir centro sąjunga, LiCS) was a conservative-liberal political party in Lithuania active between 2003 and 2014.

It was a member of the Liberal International and the Alliance of Liberals and Democrats for Europe (ALDE).

== History ==
LiCS was formed in 2003 by a merger of the Liberal Union of Lithuania, Centre Union of Lithuania and Modern Christian Democratic Union.

The combined party was led by Gintautas Babravičius. In the 2004 European Parliamentary Elections it gained 11.2% of the vote and returned two MEPs.

In the 2004 parliamentary elections on 10 October 2004, the party won 9.1% of the popular vote and 18 out of 141 seats in the Seimas. Initially, the party joined the opposition with the Homeland Union. In early 2006, Liberal Movement was formed by dissident members of LiCS. After the fall of Brazauskas-led government later the same year, LiCS joined the new government of Gediminas Kirkilas.

In the October 2008 parliamentary elections, LiCS retained eight seats out of its previous 18 and received 5.3% of the national vote, and formed a coalition with the Homeland Union – Lithuanian Christian Democrats, Liberal Movement, and National Resurrection Party (TPP).

On 22 September 2011, the party agreed to absorb the TPP, whose MPs had been sitting in the LiCS parliamentary group.

In the October 2012 parliamentary elections, the party lost all eight seats, taking just 2.1% of the national vote.

On 12 July 2014, the LiCS merged with YES to form the Lithuanian Freedom Union (LLS).

== Election results ==
=== Seimas ===
Election	Votes (Note: Proportional representation votes.)	%	Seats	+/–	Government
2004	109,872	9.19 (#5)	18 / 141	▲18	Opposition (2004−2006)
2004	109,872	9.19 (#5)	18 / 141	▲18	Coalition (2006−2008)
2008	66,078	5.34 (#7)	8 / 141	▼10	Coalition
2012	28,263	2.15 (#9)	0 / 141	▼8	Extra-parliamentary

== See also ==
- Liberalism in Lithuania
