= Lithuanian Social Democratic Union =

Lithuanian Social Democratic Union Lietuvos socialdemokratų sąjunga
- Leader: Arvydas Akstinavičius
- Founded: December 27, 1999
- Dissolved: December 4, 2014
- Split from: Social Democratic Party of Lithuania
- Headquarters: Vilniaus g. 22, Vilnius
- Membership: 1222
- Ideology: Social democracy Left-wing nationalism
- Political position: Centre-left
- Colours: Violet and red
- Seimas: 0 / 141
- European Parliament: 0 / 12
- Municipal councils: 6 / 1,526

Website
- www.lsds.lt

Lithuanian Social Democratic Union (Lithuanian: Lietuvos socialdemokratų sąjunga) was a minor social democratic political party in Lithuania. The party had 6 representatives at the municipal level by 2011 and had no seats in either Seimas or EP. The leader of the party was Arvydas Akstinavičius.

In 2012 it participated in the Parliamentarian election having formed joint alliance with 2 euroskeptic nationalist parties, named "For Lithuania in Lithuania". The controversial symbol of this electoral union was a white sheep kicking a black sheep out of the logo. The alliance received 0.94% of votes.

By the end of 2014 party dissolved itself.
