= Order and Justice =

Order and Justice Tvarka ir teisingumas
- Abbreviation: TT
- Leader: Almantas Petkus (last)
- Founder: Rolandas Paksas
- Founded: 9 March 2002
- Dissolved: 2 January 2025
- Split from: Liberal Union of Lithuania
- Merged into: Freedom and Justice
- Headquarters: Gedimino pr. 10 / Totorių g. 1, Vilnius
- Membership: 12,043 (2018)
- Ideology: Right-wing populism; Soft Euroscepticism
- Political position: Right-wing
- European affiliation: AEN (until 2009); ADDE (2014–2017)
- European Parliament group: UEN (2004–2009); EFD (2009–2014); EFDD (2014–2019)
- Colours: Yellow; Blue

Website
- www.tvarka.lt

Order and Justice (Lithuanian: Tvarka ir teisingumas, TT), formerly the Liberal Democratic Party (Liberalų Demokratų Partija, LDP) was a right-wing political party in Lithuania that self-identified as "left-of-centre", at least on economic matters. It had eight members in the Seimas, the unicameral Lithuanian parliament, as of the last election it participated in (2016).

Formed as the 'Liberal Democratic Party' in 2002, the party achieved almost immediate success with the election of leader Rolandas Paksas as President of Lithuania within its first year. Paksas's impeachment led to the party reorganising itself as 'Order and Justice' to compete in the 2004 parliamentary election. Since then, it was the fourth-largest party in the Seimas, and finished third in the elections to the European Parliament and to the presidency.

The party sat on the right, possessed a radical and anti-establishment identity, and has been described as both socially conservative and 'liberal' or 'right-liberal', in line with its original identity. Its support was strongest in the north-west Samogitia region. The party's two MEPs sat in the Europe of Freedom and Direct Democracy group in the European Parliament, with the party having previously belonged to the now-defunct Union for Europe of the Nations (UEN) and Europe of Freedom and Democracy (EFD) groups.

In 2020, the party chairman Remigijus Žemaitaitis signed an agreement with the chairman of the Lithuanian Freedom Union (Liberals), Artūras Zuokas, and former MP Arturas Paulauskas to unite their political movements to form the Freedom and Justice party. Žemaitaitis was later expelled from said party and founded a new party called Dawn of Nemunas. The party was officially liquidated in January 2025.

== History ==
=== Early years (2002–2004) ===
After being defeated in the leadership election for the Liberal Union, Rolandas Paksas founded the Liberal Democratic Party (LDP) in 2002, taking with him 13 of his supporters from Liberal parliamentary group in the Seimas, making the party the fourth-largest party. Nationally, founders of the new party were not only Liberal Union's members. It attracted members of Lithuanian Centre Union (e. g. Kęstutis Trečiokas) and New Union (Social Liberals).

Paksas finished second in the first round of the presidential election on 22 December, with 19.7%: qualifying him for a run-off against incumbent President Valdas Adamkus. For the run-off, Paksas represented a youthful alternative to the ageing candidate, adopting the slogan 'Vote for Change'; despite all the parties except the LDP backing Adamkus, he won across almost all of the country, with 54.7%. The campaign was likened to the previous spring's French presidential election and Paksas to Jean-Marie Le Pen for his populism. However, unlike Le Pen, the Paksas immediately announced his support for Lithuania's ongoing process of accession to the European Union and NATO.

In June, 2003, Paksas set about fighting political corruption that saw 700 public officials under the old administration acquire land illegally. However, this was soon overshadowed by revelations in October that Paksas gave citizenship to, and heard requests for political favours from, Yury Borisov, a Russian businessman that had donated $400,000 to Paksas's campaign, and that high-ranking members of Paksas's staff had connections to Russian criminal groups. Although Paksas was found not to have been influenced by the criminals, his staff had been; Paksas offered that his six close advisers named in the report resign, but calls for Paksas himself to resign mounted.

Paksas alleged that the parliamentary commission set up to investigate the claims was set up for political reasons, and refused to cooperate. In response, the four other parties (Social Democratic Party of Lithuania, New Union (Social Liberals), Liberal and Centre Union and Homeland Union) initiated impeachment proceedings. In December, the Constitutional Court ruled that granting citizenship to Borisovas was illegal and impeachable. Despite this, Paksas remained popular with the public. On 6 April 2004, the Seimas voted to impeach him and remove him from office on three counts with 86, 86, and 89 MPs voting to impeach, with 85 required. Nonetheless, after his impeachment, he was tried in the criminal courts, and acquitted on all charges. The Constitutional Court found that Paksas shall be precluded for life from being elected as president, as a member of the Seimas and some other high-ranking official positions. Paksas complained against the lifetime duration of the impeachment and filed a complaint with the European Court of Human Rights (Strasbourg). In January 2011 the Court rendered his judgement in favor of Paksas. In spite of the Conventual obligation to fulfill Judgements of the Court and in spite of enforcement proceedings by the Council of Europe the Judgement of the European Court of Human Rights has not been fulfilled. In 2012 Paksas complained to the United Nations Human Rights Committee. In March 2014 the Committee found that the lifelong disqualification from political office violates the International Covenant on Civil and Political Rights. As of 2018 the violations of Human Rights as found by the European Court of Human Rights and the UN Committee on Human Rights still persist.

=== Recovery (2004–2006) ===
Another presidential election was scheduled to elect a replacement for Paksas. The LDP nominated Paksas, giving the people a referendum on his impeachment. Whilst his nomination was initially accepted, it was then thrown out by the Constitutional Court, leaving the LDP without a nominee in the election. In the first election to the European Parliament, the LDP won 6.8% of the vote, and one seat. The member of the European Parliament from the Lithuanian Liberal Democratic party was Rolandas Pavilionis, a former rector of Vilnius University. He joined the Union for Europe of the Nations.

Throughout Paksas's scandal and impeachment, the Liberal Democrats presented soft opposition to the governing centre-left coalition, alongside the united Liberal and Centre Union and Homeland Union. In the parliamentary election in October, the LDP formed a coalition called Coalition for Rolandas Paksas 'For Order and Justice' , which was successful in winning 11 seats. However, the centre-left coalition managed to hold on to power, thanks to a failure of the centre-right parties to agree to cooperate.

=== Renaming and joining the government (2006–2016) ===
The congress of the party, held on 13 May 2006, declared, that the party had passed a difficult stage of its establishment successively, encouraging people of Lithuania to constantly oppose corruption and power misapplication in the country and changing the name of the party to 'Order and Justice'. The formal reason for changing the name was the fact that four different political groups used the word 'liberal' in their names. According to unofficial views of some party members, the new name mirrors the party's more conservative position than when it was founded in 2002.

In the 2007 municipal elections, although the party was disappointed with the general results, it won a plurality in Vilnius, and formed a coalition with the Social Democratic Party (LSDP) under mayor Juozas Imbrasas. This was despite Law and Order members of the Seimas then supporting motions of no confidence in several LSDP cabinet members for handling of the privatisation of Alita.

The Order and Justice Party ran in the 2008 election to the Seimas with a tactic of decontaminating Paksas, despite Paksas's inability to hold political office after his impeachment, and released a film that was shown in cinemas nationwide. Aiming to greatly increase its number of seats and form the new government, the party saw its share of the vote increase only slightly, to 12.7%, and its number of seats increase by 4, to 15. This minor increase was attributed to the rise of the National Resurrection Party, which shared the same electorate as the Order and Justice. The dramatic doubling of the centre-right's share of seats allowed them to form a government: including three parties, but not the Order and Justice.

At the 2009 European elections, the Order and Justice won two seats, up from one in 2004, coming third. After the election, they left the disbanding Union for Europe of the Nations (UEN), and joined the more eurosceptic Europe of Freedom and Democracy (EFD).

In May 2012, ahead of the October 2012 election, Order and Justice signed a pact with the Labour and the Social Democrats to cooperate in any post-election negotiations. The Order and Justice joined government with these parties, which lasted up until 2016.

Following the 2014 European election, the Order and Justice MEPs rejoined the EFD group in the European Parliament, which was renamed Europe of Freedom and Direct Democracy (EFDD) for the new parliamentary term. In October 2016 election, the party fared poorly by getting 8 seats in Seimas. After this result, Rolandas Paksas resigned as party's chairman.

=== Decline and dissolution (2016–2025) ===
By the summer of 2018, negotiations started between Lithuanian Farmers and Greens Union, Social Democratic Labour Party of Lithuania and the Order and Justice considering possible cooperation between them. On September 11, 2018, those parties signed a confidence and supply agreement. On May 29, 2019, Social Democratic Labour Party of Lithuania and Order and Justice chairmen Gediminas Kirkilas and Remigijus Žemaitaitis announced to public that talks about expanded coalition between these parties and Lithuanian Farmers and Greens Union has started. On June 7, 2019, Electoral Action of Poles in Lithuania – Christian Families Alliance council agreed that party should join these talks, which were concluded on July 5, 2019.

New coalition lasted just for two months as the Order and Justice parliamentary group dissolved itself on September 10, 2019, when majority of the Order and Justice parliamentary group's members founded new parliamentary group called "For the Welfare of Lithuania" (which by itself existed up until mid-January 2020). On September 19, 2019, this parliamentary group signed a confidence and supply agreement with coalition's parties. On October 23, 2019, the Order and Justice had been expelled from coalition.

By the end of 2018, Rolandas Paksas left the party. By this Order and Justice lost its representative in the European Parliament. In 2019 and 2020 the party lost many notorious members (e. g. Petras Gražulis, Kęstas Komskis) by expulsions or resignations. On September 25, 2019, Remigijus Žemaitaitis proposed formation of new party called "Sovereign Lithuania" or "United Lithuania – Sovereign Lithuania".

Prior the 2020 parliamentary election, former party members joined ranks not only in the Freedom and Justice, but also in the Lithuanian Farmers and Greens Union (e. g. Algimantas Dumbrava) and in the Liberal Movement (e. g. most of Pagėgiai Municipality members along with the mayor, Vaidas Bendaravičius).

Party underwent a prolonged disestablishment, partly due to being a defendant in criminal proceedings. Almantas Petkus, the former secretary-general lead the party through this time. Finally, the party was convicted for BK 226, influence peddling in November 2023 and ordered to pay around €113 thousand in damages while another €279 thousand were confiscated as illicit gains. However then the party was subsequently liquidated on 2 January 2025.

== Leaders ==
- Rolandas Paksas (2002–2003 and 2004–2016)
- Valentinas Mazuronis (2003–2004)
- Remigijus Žemaitaitis (2016–2020)
- Almantas Petkus (2020–2024)

== Notable members ==
- Petras Gražulis, a controversial conservative politician, a staunch opponent of the LGBT rights, known for his anti-gay statements
- Juozas Imbrasas, former member of the European Parliament and mayor of Vilnius
- Marija Aušrinė Pavilionienė, a famous Lithuanian feminist and human rights activist, used to be a member of the party
- Rolandas Pavilionis (1944–2006), a former dean of Vilnius University

== Elections ==
=== Presidential elections ===
- 2002–3: Rolandas Paksas wins election with 54.7% of votes in run-off, after finishing 2nd, with 19.7%, in first round.
- 2004: Did not enter
- 2009: Valentinas Mazuronis finishes 3rd, with 6.16%.
- 2014: Did not enter
- 2019: Did not enter

=== Parliamentary elections ===
Election	Votes	%	Seats	+/–	Position	Government
2004	135,807 (PR) (as part of the R. Paksas coalition “Order and Justice”)	11.36	11 / 141	▲11	▲5th	Opposition
2008	156,777 (PR)	12.68	15 / 141	▲4	▲4th	Opposition
2012	100,120 (PR)	7.63	11 / 141	▼4	4th	Coalition
2016	67,817 (PR)	5.55	8 / 141	▼3	▼5th	Opposition (2016–2019)
2016	67,817 (PR)	5.55	8 / 141	▼3	▼5th	Coalition (2019)
2016	67,817 (PR)	5.55	8 / 141	▼3	▼5th	Opposition (2019–2020)

=== European Parliament elections ===
- 2004: 6th, 6.8% of the vote and 1 seat (of 13).
- 2009: 3rd, 11.9% of the vote and 2 seats (of 12).
- 2014: 4th, 14.25% of the vote and 2 seats (of 11).
- 2019: 11th, 2.73% of the vote and did not receive any seats (former party leader Rolandas Paksas ran as an independent and received 4% of the vote).
