= Andrius Kubilius =

Lithuanian politician (born 1956)

Andrius Kubilius MEP
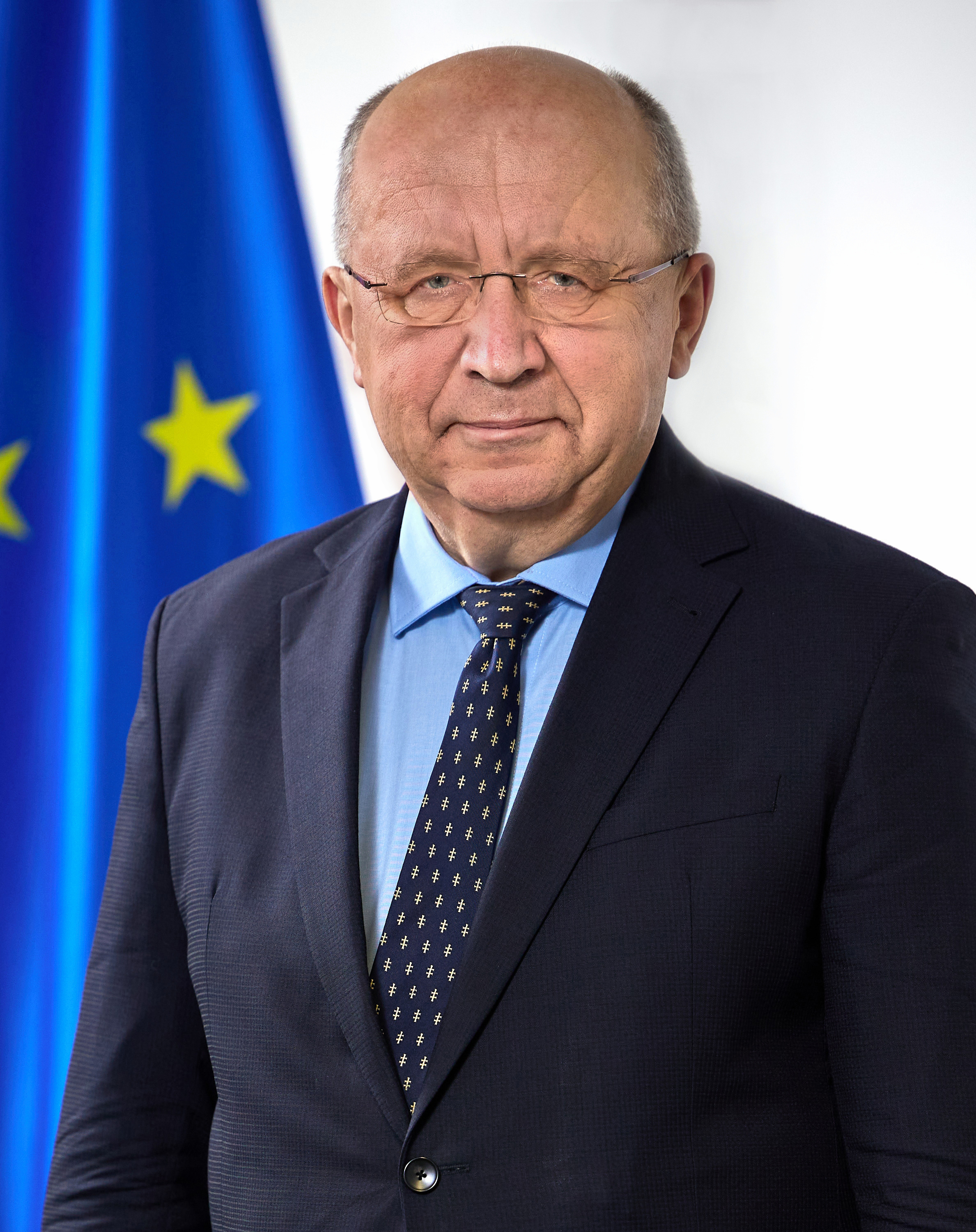
- Official portrait, 2024

European Commissioner for Defence and Space
- Incumbent
- Assumed office 1 December 2024
- Commission: Von der Leyen II
- Preceded by: position established

Leader of the Opposition (Lithuania)
- In office 20 December 2012 – 14 November 2016
- Preceded by: Vytautas Gapšys
- Succeeded by: Viktorija Čmilytė-Nielsen (2019)
- In office 20 January 2005 – 9 October 2006
- Preceded by: Gintaras Steponavičius (2001)
- Succeeded by: Gediminas Kirkilas (2008)

10th and 14th Prime Minister of Lithuania
- In office 9 December 2008 – 13 December 2012
- Preceded by: Gediminas Kirkilas
- Succeeded by: Algirdas Butkevičius
- In office 3 November 1999 – 26 October 2000
- Preceded by: Irena Degutienė (Acting)
- Succeeded by: Rolandas Paksas
Party roles
Chairman of the Homeland Union
In office 24 May 2003 – 25 April 2015
Preceded by	Vytautas Landsbergis
Succeeded by	Gabrielius Landsbergis
Parliamentary roles
Member of the European Parliament
In office 2 July 2019 – 30 November 2024
Succeeded by	Liudas Mažylis
Constituency	Lithuania
Member of the Seimas
In office 14 November 2016 – 1 July 2019
Constituency	Multi-member
In office 15 November 2004 – 13 November 2016
Preceded by	Rolandas Paksas
Succeeded by	Ingrida Šimonytė
Constituency	Antakalnis
In office 25 November 1992 – 14 November 2004
Constituency	Multi-member

Personal details
- Born: 8 December 1956 (age 69) Vilnius, then part of Lithuanian SSR, Soviet Union
- Party: Homeland Union
- Spouse: Rasa Kubilienė
- Children: 2
- Education: Vilnius University
- Occupation: Physical engineer • Politician

Andrius Kubilius (Note: Lithuanian pronunciation: [ˈɐnʲdʲrʲʊs kʊˈbɪlʲʊs]) (born 8 December 1956) is a Lithuanian politician who is currently serving as the European Commissioner for Defence and Space in the Second von der Leyen Commission. He previously served as a Member of the European Parliament (MEP) from 2019 to 2024 and as Prime Minister of Lithuania from 1999 to 2000 and again from 2008 to 2012. He was the leader of the conservative political party Homeland Union from 2003 to 2015, of which he continues to be a member.

== Early life and education ==
Kubilius was born in Vilnius. After graduation from the 22nd secondary school in Vilnius, Kubilius was accepted to Vilnius University and studied in the Faculty of Physics until 1979. He continued his academic career and postgraduate studies at Vilnius University from 1981 to 1984.

== Career in Lithuanian politics ==
=== Early career ===
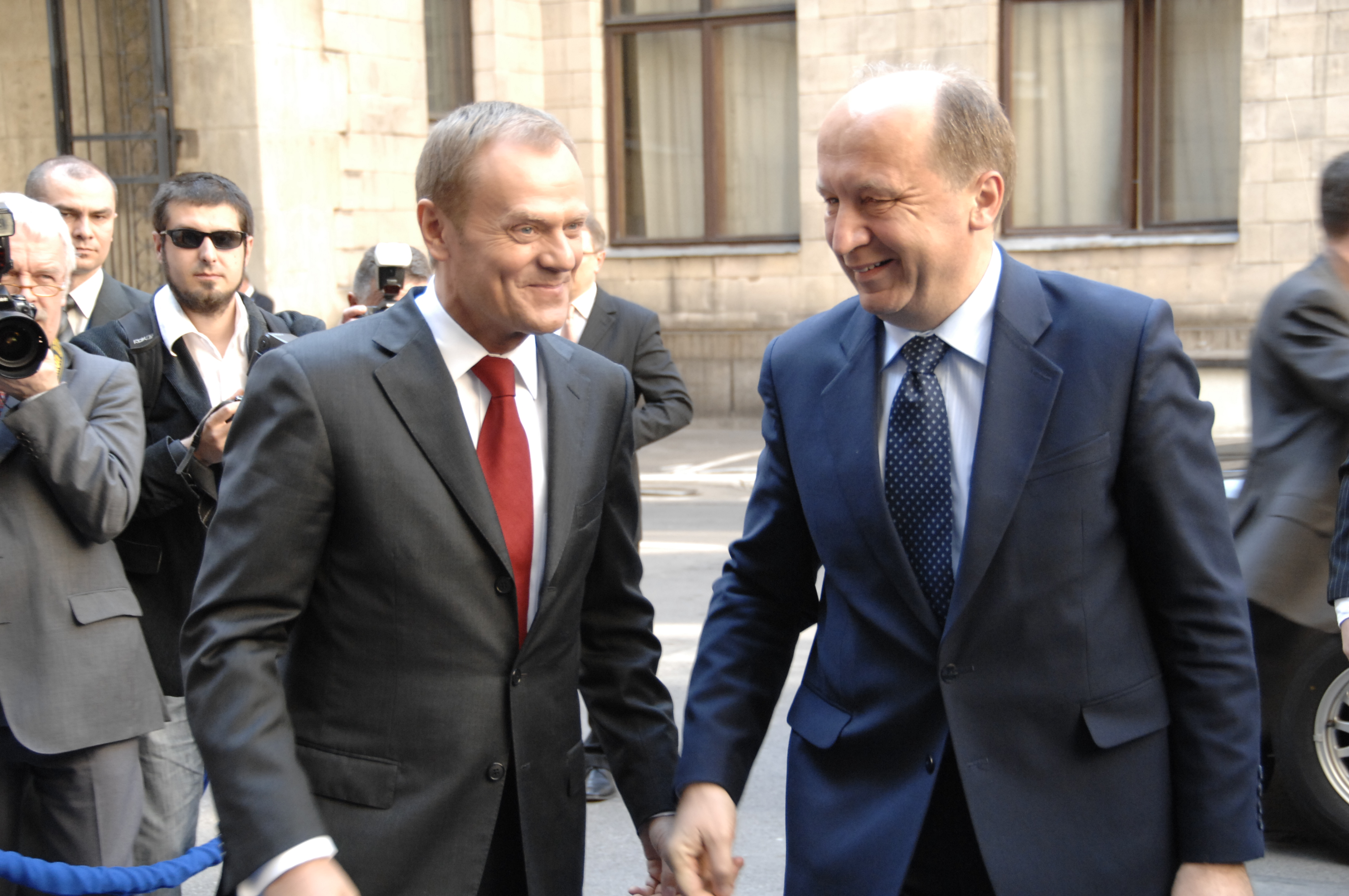
Kubilius with Polish Prime Minister Donald Tusk in Warsaw, 29 April 2009

Kubilius became a member of the pro-independence Sąjūdis movement, who favoured independence from the occupation of the Soviet Union. He later became the Executive Secretary of the Sąjūdis Council. Soon after the re-establishment of Lithuania's independence, Kubilius was elected to the Seimas (parliament). Since then Kubilius has been an active figure in Lithuanian politics. He became a member of the Homeland Union – Lithuanian Christian Democrats in 1993.

Between 1996 and 1999 Kubilius served as Deputy Speaker of Seimas.

=== 10th Prime Minister of Lithuania, 1999–2000 ===
After Rolandas Paksas resigned as the Prime Minister of Lithuania, Kubilius became prime minister forming the first Kubilius cabinet and serving until the 2000 parliamentary election.

In 2000, he supported a law passed on 13 June by the Seimas seeking compensation from Russia for damages inflicted during the illegal Soviet occupation of Lithuania and the Baltics, a key issue for the prime minister and Homeland Union. The move was endorsed by Estonian Prime Minister Mart Laar and Latvian Prime Minister Andris Berzins, who both supported cooperation in the Baltic Assembly on the issue.

=== 14th Prime Minister of Lithuania, 2008–2012 ===
Kubilius led the Homeland Union – Lithuanian Christian Democrats Party into elections on 28 October 2008. His Homeland Union won the election representing a victory for Lithuania's center right after seven years of leftist rule. Kubilius was already known as a sharp critic of the Russian regime; Homeland Union promised to combat dependence on Russian energy and enact needed economic reforms. Following the election Kubilius was, as expected, nominated as the Homeland Union's candidate for Prime Minister. The coalition agreement was signed on 17 November. On 27 November 2008 Kubilius was officially appointed as Prime Minister of Lithuania forming the second Kubilius cabinet. The cabinet received 89 votes in favour, 27 against, and 16 abstentions in the confidence vote in the Seimas.

After taking office, he "cut public spending by 30%, slashed pensions by 11% and even took a pay cut of 45% himself". He followed a policy of diversifying Lithuania's energy supplies away from Russia including filing a lawsuit against Gazprom, then Lithuania's sole supplier of natural gas, seeking over €1 billion in damages and depriving the Russian company of control over Lithuanian infrastructure. He was active in seeking financial compensation from Russia for the illegal Soviet occupation of Lithuania, labeling the issue a priority upon taking office in 2008. In 2011, the issue continued to be a priority with his foreign minister labeling it "ridiculous to talk with Russia without resolving issues related to the occupation." He instituted a commission on 23 May 2012 to move the issue forward. He also called for the issue of financial compensation from Russia to be included as a condition of EU-Russia relations. His strong stance towards the Russian regime resulted in a freeze of relations between Lithuania and Moscow.

As a result of his policies, Lithuania made one of strongest economic recoveries in Europe. Kubilius is considered by some as being the best Prime Minister in Lithuania's modern history. Among his accomplishments were reining in public expenditures, preparation to join the Eurozone, and reform of the energy sector. However, his Homeland Union party lost the 2012 election to succeed him leading to the Butkevičius Cabinet. Kubilius became the first prime minister of Lithuania to serve his entire term. According to The Economist, "the election came too early for Mr. Kubilius to benefit from a recovery from the painful austerity measures that he imposed when he realised that Lithuania risked becoming the Baltic Greece." He was viewed as having "sacrificed his political popularity" to save the country from bankruptcy following leftist rule.

== European Union career ==
=== Member of the European Parliament, 2019–2024 ===
In 2019, Kubilius was elected a Member of the European Parliament for Homeland Union and served as a member of the European People's Party Group. He served on the Committee on Foreign Affairs and the Committee on Industry, Research and Energy.

In addition to his committee assignments, Kubilius was part of the parliament's delegations to the Euronest Parliamentary Assembly and to the EU-Ukraine Parliamentary Association Committee. He was also a member of the Spinelli Group.

In November 2021, Kubilius joined a group of seven Members of the European Parliament led by Raphaël Glucksmann to Taiwan to send a strong signal in support of the self-ruling island, despite a threat of retaliation from China.

==== Standing rapporteur on Russia ====
In 2020, he was appointed the parliament's standing rapporteur on relations with Russia. In this role, he was responsible for forming the European Parliament's position on the subject matter. Accepting the role, Kubilius stated, "My critical view of the Kremlin regime was formed long ago, and it is unchanging. I have made no effort to conceal it while at the European Parliament.”

In 2021, he stated it is "impossible" to have good relations with Russia and called for the EU to phase out its imports of oil and natural gas from Russia. He praised Turkey for "proving thrice [in Syria, Libya and Nagorno-Karabakh] that the Kremlin fears the fist." On the 12th anniversary of the Russian invasion of Georgia in 2020, Kubilius noted Russia's "continued provocations" in Georgia stating that they "grossly violate international law". He led the call by the European People's Party for sanctions against all those responsible for Russia's poisoning of Alexei Navalny.

=== European Commission, 2024–present ===
In July 2024, Kubilius was nominated by the Lithuanian government to be his country's EU commissioner. Lithuanian President Gitanas Nausėda gave his approval on 22 August. His nomination was approved by the Seimas in 3 September with Kubilius eyeing portfolios related to defence, security, and EU enlargement as ideal for Lithuania given Europe's security crisis.

In September, President von der Leyen allocated the Defence and Space portfolio to Kubilius. He is the first to hold the post. The creation of the post indicated that security had become a key item on the EU's agenda. His nomination was approved by the European Parliament on 7 November allowing him to take the office. Upon taking office he stated that his priority would be strengthening the bloc's defence military deterrence capabilities.

== Personal life ==
Kubilius is married to Rasa Kubilienė, a violinist in the Lithuanian National Symphony Orchestra; the couple have two sons: Andrius Kubilius and Vytautas Kubilius, and three grandchildren. In addition to his native Lithuanian, Kubilius also speaks English and Russian.

Political offices
Preceded by Irena Degutienė; Acting	Prime Minister of Lithuania; 1999–2000	Succeeded by Rolandas Paksas
Preceded by Gediminas Kirkilas	Prime Minister of Lithuania; 2008–2012	Succeeded by Algirdas Butkevičius
