= Eleventh Seimas =

Eleventh Seimas of Lithuania
←	Tenth Seimas of Lithuania	Twelfth Seimas of Lithuania	→
- Seimas Palace

Overview
- Legislative body: Seimas
- Jurisdiction: Lithuania
- Term: 2012—2016

The Eleventh Seimas of Lithuania was a parliament (Seimas) elected in Lithuania. Elections took place on 14 October 2012, with the run-off on 28 October. The Seimas commenced its work on 17 November 2012 and served a four-year term, with the last session taking place on 10 November 2016.

== Elections ==
In the elections in 2012, 70 members of the parliament were elected on proportional party lists and 71 in single member constituencies. Elections took place on 14 October 2012. Run-off elections were held on 28 October in the single-seat constituencies where no candidate secured a seat in the first round.

Party	Proportional			Constituency seats	Total seats	+/–
Party	Votes	%	Seats	Constituency seats	Total seats	+/–
Labour Party	271,520	20.69	17	12	29	+19
Social Democrats	251,610	19.18	15	23	38	+13
Homeland Union	206,590	15.75	13	20	33	–12
Liberal Movement	117,476	8.95	7	3	10	–1
The Way of Courage	109,448	8.34	7	–	7	New
Order and Justice	100,120	7.63	6	5	11	–4
Electoral Action of Poles in Lithuania	79,840	6.08	5	3	8	+5
Peasant and Greens Union	53,141	4.05	–	1	1	–2
Liberal and Centre Union	28,263	2.15	–	–	–	–8
YES	24,129	1.84	–	–	–	New
Socialist People's Front	16,515	1.26	–	–	–	0
Christian Party	16,494	1.26	–	–	–	New
For Lithuania in Lithuania	12,854	0.98	–	–	–	New
Young Lithuania	8,632	0.66	–	–	–	0
Democratic Labour and Unity Party	4,383	0.33	–	–	–	New
Emigrants' Party	4,015	0.31	–	–	–	New
Republican Party	3,661	0.28	–	–	–	New
Lithuanian People's Party	3,399	0.26	–	–	–	New
Independents	–	–	–	3	3	–1
Invalid/blank votes	57,924	–	–	–	–	–
Total	1,370,014	100	70	70	140	–
Registered voters/turnout	2,588,418	52.93	–	–	–	–
Source: Central Electoral Commission

== Activities ==
Speaker of the Seimas

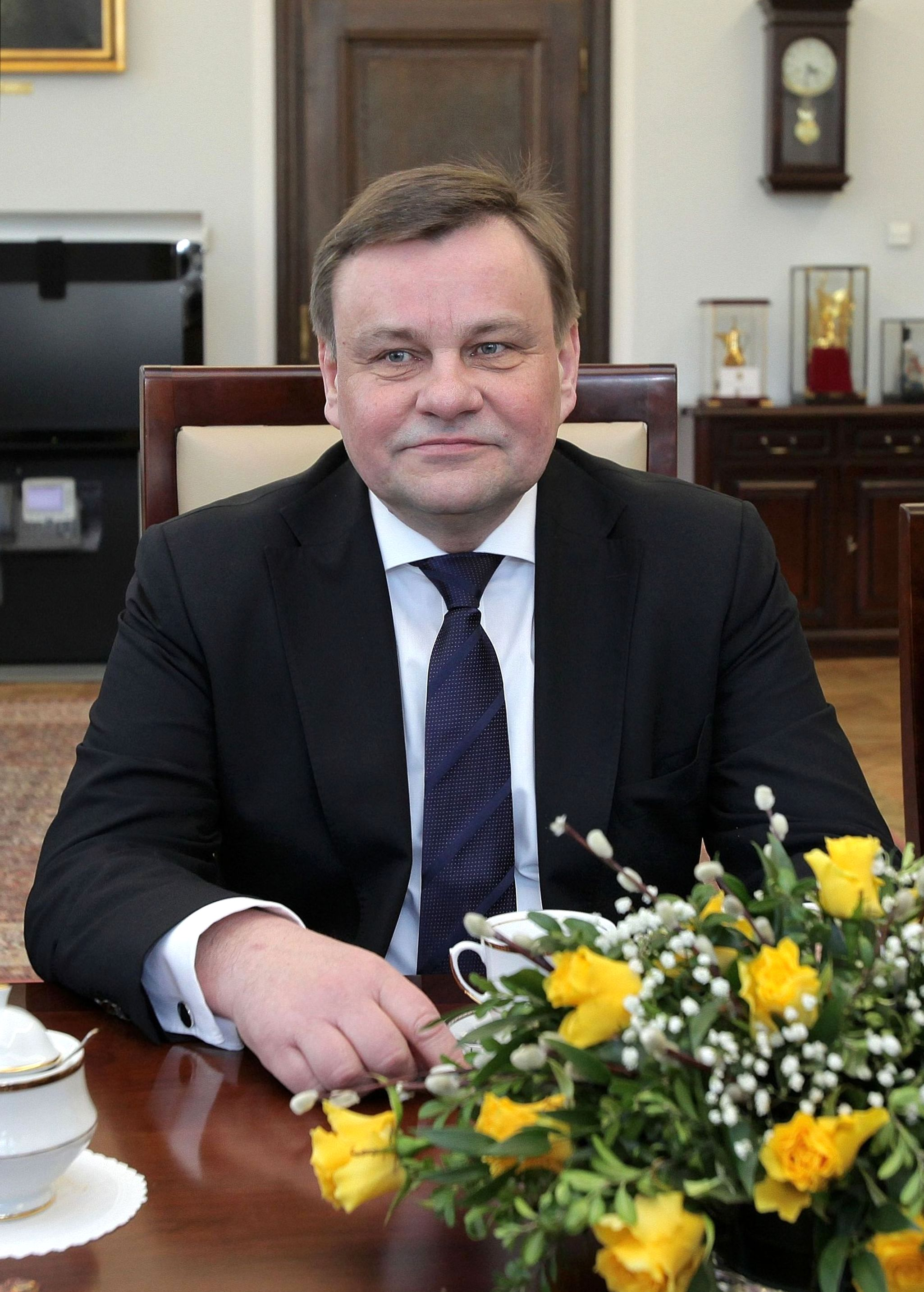
Vydas Gedvilas (Labour Party)
17 November 2012 – 3 October 2013

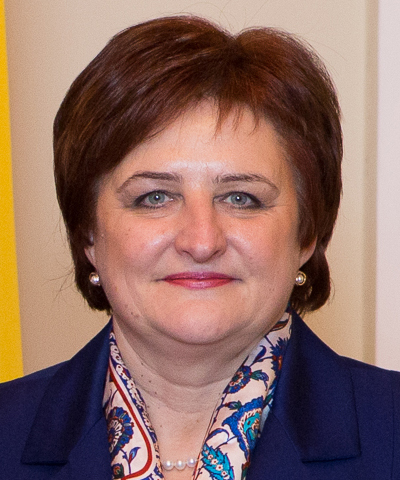
Loreta Graužinienė (Labour Party)
3 October 2013 – 14 November 2016

Social Democrats have been the largest party in the Eleventh Seimas and form a coalition government with the Labour Party and the Order and Justice party. Electoral Action of Poles in Lithuania was initially a member of the ruling coalition, but left in 2014.

Vydas Gedvilas of the Labour Party was elected as the Speaker of the Seimas during the first session. He resigned less than a year later and was replaced by Loreta Graužinienė for the rest of the term.

This parliament led to the adoption of the euro and introduced direct mayoral elections.

== Composition ==
=== Parliamentary groups ===
After the elections, the parliamentary groups were formed in the Seimas, largely on the party lines: Social Democratic Party of Lithuania (LSDPF), Labour Party (DPF), Liberal Movement (LSF), Order and Justice (FTT), Electoral Action of the Poles in Lithuania (LLRAF), Homeland Union - Lithuanian Christian Democrats (TSLKDF), Way of Courage (DKF) and the Mixed Group of Members of the Seimas (MSNG).

By the end of the term of the Seimas, the following parliamentary groups were active.

Name	Abbr.	Members
Social Democratic Party of Lithuania	LSDPF	39
Homeland Union	TS-LKDF	30
Labor Party	DPF	28
Liberal Movement	LSF	12
Order and Justice	TTLDF	9
Electoral Action of Poles in Lithuania – Christian Families Alliance	LLRA–KŠSF	8
Others	MSNG	13
Vacant		2

=== Members ===
155 members have served on the Eleventh Seimas. After the resignation of Vytautas Gapšys, Aurimas Truncė qualified for a Seimas seat through the electoral list of the Labour Party but relinquished the seat before taking oath.

Name, Surname	Constituency	Electoral list	Notes
Remigijus Ačas	Nationwide	TT	
Mantas Adomėnas	Nationwide	TS	
Vilija Aleknaitė-Abramikienė	Nationwide	TS	
Vytenis Andriukaitis	4 Žirmūnų	LSDP	Until 15 September 2014
Arvydas Anušauskas	2 Senamiesčio	TS	
Petras Auštrevičius	Nationwide	LS	Until 27 June 2014
Audronius Ažubalis	6 Šeškinės	TS	
Zigmantas Balčytis	Nationwide	LSDP	Until 16 November 2012
Linas Balsys	8 Karoliniškių	Independent	
Virginija Baltraitienė	43 Kėdainių	DP	
Kęstutis Bartkevičius	38 Mažeikių	TT	
Mindaugas Bastys	64 Šakių	LSDP	
Rima Baškienė	45 Šiaulių kaimiškoji	LVŽS	
Juozas Bernatonis	Nationwide	LSDP	
Agnė Bilotaitė	Nationwide	TS	
Šarūnas Birutis	53 Ignalinos - Švenčionių	DP	
Vilija Blinkevičiūtė	Nationwide	LSDP	Until 16 November 2012
Bronius Bradauskas	59 Kaišiadorių - Elektrėnų	LSDP	
Stasys Brundza	Nationwide	DK	From 1 July 2014
Saulius Bucevičius	39 Akmenės - Joniškio	DP	
Valentinas Bukauskas	40 Telšių	DP	
Algirdas Butkevičius	68 Vilkaviškio	LSDP	
Vida Marija Čigriejienė	18 Panemunės	TS	
Petras Čimbaras	54 Molėtų - Švenčionių	DP	
Viktorija Čmilytė-Nielsen	Nationwide	LS	From 21 April 2015
Rimantas Dagys	11 Šilainių	TS	
Kęstutis Daukšys	Nationwide	DP	
Irena Degutienė	1 Naujamiesčio	TS	
Sergej Dmitrijev	Nationwide	DP	
Larisa Dmitrijeva	Nationwide	DP	
Arūnas Dudėnas	Nationwide	LSDP	
Algimantas Dumbrava	52 Zarasų - Visagino	TT	From 22 March 2013
Arimantas Dumčius	15 Kalniečių	TS	
Vilija Filipovičienė	Nationwide	DP	
Viktoras Fiodorovas	Nationwide	DP	
Vitalijus Gailius	46 Pakruojo - Joniškio	LS	
Vytautas Gapšys	Nationwide	DP	Until 7 August 2016
Vydas Gedvilas	Nationwide	DP	
Eugenijus Gentvilas	Nationwide	LS	
Povilas Gylys	Nationwide	DK	
Kęstutis Glaveckas	Nationwide	LS	
Loreta Graužinienė	Nationwide	DP	
Petras Gražulis	31 Gargždų	TT	
Kazys Grybauskas	61 Ukmergės	LSDP	From 22 March 2013
Šarūnas Gustainis	4 Žirmūnų	LS	From 24 March 2015
Gediminas Jakavonis	Nationwide	DP	
Saulius Jakimavičius	Nationwide	DP	From 14 September 2016
Donatas Jankauskas	66 Kauno kaimiškoji	TS	
Zbignev Jedinskij	Nationwide	LLRA	From 19 November 2012
Edmundas Jonyla	42 Raseinių	LSDP	
Sergejus Jovaiša	Nationwide	TS	
Rasa Juknevičienė	14 Žaliakalnio	TS	
Benediktas Juodka	Nationwide	LSDP	
Vytautas Juozapaitis	Nationwide	TS	
Vytautas Kamblevičius	Nationwide	TT	
Algis Kašėta	70 Varėnos - Eišiškių	LS	Until 8 April 2015
Liutauras Kazlavickas	Nationwide	TS	
Gediminas Kirkilas	Nationwide	LSDP	
Kęstas Komskis	Nationwide	TT	
Jonas Kondrotas	Nationwide	DP	
Vanda Kravčionok	Nationwide	LLRA	
Dainius Kreivys	5 Fabijoniškių	TS	
Andrius Kubilius	3 Antakalnio	TS	
Dalia Kuodytė	Nationwide	LS	
Rytas Kupčinskas	12 Aleksoto - Vilijampolės	TS	
Kazimieras Kuzminskas	16 Dainavos	TS	
Juzef Kvetkovskij	Nationwide	LLRA	
Orinta Leiputė	Nationwide	LSDP	From 19 November 2012
Arminas Lydeka	Nationwide	LS	From 1 July 2014
Michal Mackevič	Nationwide	LLRA	
Vincė Vaidevutė Margevičienė	13 Centro	TS	
Raimundas Markauskas	69 Dzūkijos	DP	
Eligijus Masiulis	21 Marių	LS	Until 19 May 2016
Kęstutis Masiulis	Nationwide	TS	
Antanas Matulas	47 Pasvalio - Panevėžio	TS	
Vytautas Antanas Matulevičius	Nationwide	DK	
Andrius Mazuronis	Nationwide	TT	
Valentinas Mazuronis	Nationwide	TT	Until 25 June 2014
Vidas Mikalauskas	70 Varėnos - Eišiškių	LSDP	From 29 June 2015
Gintautas Mikolaitis	Nationwide	LSDP	From 19 November 2012
Dangutė Mikutienė	58 Trakų - Elektrėnų	DP	
Kristina Miškinienė	71 Lazdijų - Druskininkų	LSDP	
Albinas Mitrulevičius	29 Marijampolės	LSDP	
Arvydas Mockus	24 Saulės	LSDP	
Alma Monkauskaitė	41 Kelmės	LSDP	
Audrius Nakas	Nationwide	DK	From 14 April 2015
Jaroslav Narkevič	57 Vilniaus - Trakų	LLRA	
Petras Narkevičius	26 Nevėžio	DP	
Antanas Nesteckis	Nationwide	LSDP	
Juozas Olekas	63 Suvalkijos	LSDP	
Andrius Palionis	67 Prienų - Birštono	Independent	
Zdzislav Palevič	Nationwide	LLRA	Until 16 November 2012
Raimundas Paliukas	20 Baltijos	DP	
Algirdas Vaclovas Patackas	Nationwide	DK	Until 3 April 2015
Artūras Paulauskas	Nationwide	DP	
Bronius Pauža	62 Jurbarko	LSDP	
Marija Aušrinė Pavilionienė	Nationwide	LSDP	
Milda Petrauskienė	51 Utenos	LSDP	
Darius Petrošius	34 Tauragės	LSDP	
Domas Petrulis	28 Aukštaitijos	LSDP	
Audronė Pitrėnienė	37 Skuodo - Mažeikių	DP	
Raminta Popovienė	65 Kauno - Kėdainių	LSDP	
Juras Požela	Nationwide	LSDP	
Giedrė Purvaneckienė	Nationwide	LSDP	
Naglis Puteikis	19 Danės	TS	
Jurgis Razma	35 Plungės - Rietavo	TS	
Irina Rozova	Nationwide	LLRA	From 19 November 2012
Rimas Antanas Ručys	Nationwide	TT	From 26 June 2014
Julius Sabatauskas	30 Alytaus	LSDP	
Algimantas Salamakinas	44 Radviliškio	LSDP	
Ričardas Sargūnas	49 Anykščių - Kupiškio	DP	
Paulius Saudargas	7 Justiniškių	TS	
Vytautas Saulis	50 Rokiškio	LSDP	
Valerijus Simulik	25 Dainų	LSDP	
Rimantas Sinkevičius	60 Jonavos	LSDP	
Algirdas Sysas	Nationwide	LSDP	
Valdas Skarbalius	Nationwide	DP	
Artūras Skardžius	32 Šilutės - Pagėgių	LSDP	
Aurelija Stancikienė	Nationwide	DK	
Kazys Starkevičius	17 Pramonės	TS	
Gintaras Steponavičius	Nationwide	LS	
Algis Strelčiūnas	9 Lazdynų	TS	
Valentinas Stundys	Nationwide	TS	
Eduardas Šablinskas	Nationwide	LSDP	
Rimantė Šalaševičiūtė	Nationwide	LSDP	
Stasys Šedbaras	Nationwide	TS	
Irena Šiaulienė	Nationwide	LSDP	
Remigijus Šimašius	Nationwide	LS	Until 20 April 2015
Leonard Talmont	56 Vilniaus - Šalčininkų	LLRA	
Rita Tamašunienė	55 Širvintų - Vilniaus	LLRA	
Gintaras Tamošiūnas	Nationwide	DP	From 5 June 2014
Dalia Teišerskytė	Nationwide	LS	
Valdemar Tomaševski	Nationwide	LLRA	Until 16 November 2012
Darius Ulickas	Nationwide	DP	
Povilas Urbšys	27 Vakarinė	Independent	
Sergej Ursul	10 Naujosios Vilnios	DP	
Viktor Uspaskich	Nationwide	DP	Until 3 June 2016
Jolita Vaickienė	36 Kretingos	TT	
Ona Valiukevičiūtė	Nationwide	TT	
Egidijus Vareikis	Nationwide	TS	
Jonas Varkala	Nationwide	DK	
Valdas Vasiliauskas	Nationwide	DK	
Neringa Venckienė	Nationwide	DK	Until 19 June 2014
Julius Veselka	61 Ukmergės	TT	Until 16 November 2012
Birutė Vėsaitė	Nationwide	LSDP	
Arvydas Vidžiūnas	Nationwide	TS	
Vitalija Vonžutaitė	Nationwide	DP	
Mečislovas Zasčiurinskas	Nationwide	DP	
Aleksandras Zeltinis	48 Biržų - Kupiškio	LSDP	From 22 March 2013
Emanuelis Zingeris	Nationwide	TS	
Edvardas Žakaris	23 Aušros	LSDP	
Pranas Žeimys	22 Pajūrio	TS	
Remigijus Žemaitaitis	33 Šilalės - Šilutės	TT	
Rokas Žilinskas	Nationwide	TS	
Zita Žvikienė	Nationwide	DP	
