= 2016 Lithuanian parliamentary election =

- 9 October 2016 (first round); 23 October 2016 (second round)
- All 141 seats in the Seimas; 71 seats needed for a majority
- Turnout: 50.61% (▼2.32pp)
Party	Leader	Vote %	Seats	+/–
TS–LKD	Gabrielius Landsbergis	22.63	31	−2
LVŽS	Ramūnas Karbauskis	22.45	54	+53
LSDP	Algirdas Butkevičius	15.04	17	−21
LS	Remigijus Šimašius	9.45	14	+4
LCP–LPP	N. Puteikis & K. Krivickas	6.32	1	New
LLRA–KŠS	Valdemar Tomaševski	5.72	8	0
TT	Rolandas Paksas	5.55	8	−3
DP	Valentinas Mazuronis	4.88	2	−27
LŽP	Linas Balsys	2.03	1	New
LS	Darius Kuolys	1.80	1	New
Independents	–	–	4	+1
This lists parties that won seats. See the complete results below.
Single-member constituencies – first place after the first round
Prime Minister before	Prime Minister after
Algirdas Butkevičius; LSDP	Saulius Skvernelis; Independent (endorsed by LVŽS)

Parliamentary elections were held in Lithuania on 9 and 23 October 2016 to elect the 141 members of the Seimas. 71 were elected in single-member constituencies using the two-round system, and the remaining 70 in a single nationwide constituency using proportional representation. The first round was held on 9 October and the second round on 23 October.

The Lithuanian Farmers and Greens Union emerged as the largest party with 22% of the popular vote and 54 seats, up from just 4% and a single seat in the previous elections in 2012. The success of the party was attributed to voter dissatisfaction with established parties in light of low wages and persistent emigration. Homeland Union, the largest opposition party in the preceding Seimas, finished a distant second with 31 seats, though winning a slightly larger share of the national vote.

The parties of the outgoing government suffered major losses, falling from 78 seats to 28. The Social Democratic Party of Lithuania, which had been the largest party prior to the elections, lost over half its seats and finished in third place with 17. Their coalition partner the Labour Party fared even worse, falling from 29 seats to just 2. Order and Justice won 8 seats, down from 11.

== Background ==
The 2012 parliamentary elections were held on 14 October 2012, with the run-off on 28 October. The elections were won by the Social Democratic Party of Lithuania, which took 38 seats in the 141-member Eleventh Seimas. Social Democrats were joined in the coalition government by Labour, Order and Justice and the Electoral Action of Poles in Lithuania. The Polish party withdrew from the government in 2014.

The resulting government was headed by the leader of the Social Democrats, Algirdas Butkevičius, as the Prime Minister.

== Electoral system ==
The Seimas has 141 members, elected to a four-year term in parallel voting, with 71 members elected in single-member constituencies and 70 members elected by proportional representation in a single nationwide constituency. Voting in the elections is open to all citizens of Lithuania who are at least 18-years-old.

Members of the Seimas from the 71 single-member constituencies are elected by a majority vote. A candidate is elected in the first round by obtaining an absolute majority of all votes cast (including blank/invalid votes) in given constituency and turnout there is at least 40%. If these criteria are not fulfilled, a run-off between the two highest-placed candidates is held within 15 days. In the second round, the candidate who obtains the most votes is elected (an absolute majority is not required), but if turnout in a given constituency is under 40% again, the whole election process there is repeated.

The remaining 70 seats are allocated to the participating political parties using the largest remainder method. In the nationwide constituency, party lists need to receive at least 5% (7% for multi-party electoral lists) of the total votes cast (including blank/invalid votes) to be eligible for a seat (irrespective of the number of seats gained in single-member constituencies). Candidates take the seats allocated to their parties based on the preference lists submitted before the elections and adjusted by preference votes given by the voters.

To be eligible for election, candidates must be at least 25 years old on the election day, not under allegiance to a foreign state and permanently resident in Lithuania. Persons serving or due to serve a sentence imposed by the court 65 days before the elections are not eligible. Also, judges, citizens performing military service, and servicemen of professional military service and officials of statutory institutions and establishments may not stand for election. In addition, a person who has been removed from office through impeachment may not be elected.

=== Changes before the elections ===
The 71 single-seat constituencies in Lithuania were drawn in 1992, based on the principle that the number of voters in each constituency should be between 90 and 110 percent of the average number of voters per constituency. As the demographic situation changed, the Seimas Elections' Act was amended to allow a deviation in the range from 80 and 120 percent, in order to avoid major changes to constituency boundaries.

In October 2015, the Constitutional Court of Lithuania decided that the existing system, which allows the largest constituency to be as much as 50% larger than the smallest one, is unconstitutional, since it does not give sufficiently equal weight to all votes. The court stated that the constituencies should be redrawn in such a way that the number of voters in each constituency is between 90 and 110 percent of the average.

The decision of the Constitutional Court was implemented in December 2015, when the new constituencies were announced. Major changes included two additional constituencies in Vilnius.

== Opinion polls ==
Election outcome
Result	Parties										Invalid votes, %		Turnout, %	Lead, %
Result	LSDP	TS-KD	DP	TT	LRLS	LLRA	DK	LVŽS	ŽP	Other	Invalid votes, %		Turnout, %	Lead, %
Seats	17	31	2	8	14	8	0	54	1	6	4.1		50.6	23
PR vote, %	14.4	21.7	4.7	5.3	9.0	5.5	0.3	21.6	1.9	11.5	4.1		50.6	0.1
Polls by Vilmorus for Lietuvos Rytas
Date	Parties										Won't vote	Don't know	No answer	Lead
Date	LSDP	TS-KD	DP	TT	LRLS	LLRA	DK	LVŽS	ŽP	Other	Won't vote	Don't know	No answer	Lead
2–10 September 2016	16.0	9.2	5.1	4.8	2.7	2.0	0.2	12.6	1.5	9.5	12.9	20.7	2.7	3.4
1–10 July 2016	14.2	10.8	7.0	5.5	5.9	2.6	-	12.0	2.5	1.6	14.9	21.6	2.0	2.2
3–10 June 2016	16.2	10.9	8.2	6.3	3.6	2.9	-	13.0	2.6	1.4	11.4	21.0	1.8	3.2
5–13 May 2016	16.2	8.9	8.2	5.3	8.9	2.8	-	12.5	2.4	0.5	13.8	18.3	2.2	3.7
6–15 April 2016	15.7	8.0	7.7	8.4	9.6	2.5	0.8	11.1	1.8	0.8	12.1	19.5	2.0	4.6
8–13 March 2016	21.2	10.2	7.9	7.7	10.4	3.2	0.3	7.1	2.3	0.5	11.3	18.1	1.8	10.8
11–19 February 2016	23.0	9.9	6.8	7.4	8.7	3.6	0.7	7.1	2.5	0.8	10.9	16.5	2.1	13.1
14–20 January 2016	20.7	9.1	7.7	7.7	9.6	3.6	0.2	5.9	1.4	0.6	11.8	18.5	3.2	11.1
4–11 December 2015	23.5	8.4	9.2	7.0	9.8	2.9	0.3	6.0	1.9	0.6	10.5	17.5	2.4	13.7
5–14 November 2015	24.3	9.9	9.2	7.8	11.0	2.7	0.1	6.3	1.6	0.9	10.7	13.7	1.8	13.3
Polls by "Spinter tyrimai" for Delfi.lt
Date	Parties										Won't vote	Don't know	No answer	Lead
Date	LSDP	TS-KD	DP	TT	LRLS	LLRA	DK	LVŽS	ŽP	Other	Won't vote	Don't know	No answer	Lead
19–27 September 2016	15.6	13.7	5.2	4.9	5.0	4.2	-	14.0	-	9.6	16.3	11.5		1.6
23–30 August 2016	17.2	10.5	6.6	5.1	6.3	4.7	-	12.4	2.0	7.0	15.8	12.4		4.8
19–26 July 2016	15.8	10.7	7.3	6.2	6.1	4.8	-	13.4	2.3	5.3	16.1	12.0		2.4
21–29 June 2016	16.8	10.5	7.6	7.5	6.3	4.3	-	12.2	2.3	5.3	14.3	12.9		4.6
19–26 May 2016	15.5	9.3	7.5	7.6	6.6	4.3	-	11.5	3.0	3.0	16.7	15.0		4.0
19–25 April 2016	17.2	7.5	7.1	8.0	15.5	4.5	-	11.3	2.1	2.0	14.1	10.7		1.7
15–25 March 2016	18.8	10.6	5.9	9.0	15.0	4.5	-	8.2	1.7	2.3	14.4	9.6		3.8
19–27 February 2016	19.6	10.5	7.0	7.4	14.2	4.8	-	6.6	2.0	1.6	15.4	10.9		5.4
20–27 January 2016	20.9	9.9	7.4	8.6	13.0	4.0	-	6.8	2.2	1.8	25.4		-	7.9
12–18 December 2015	23.0	9.5	7.0	8.5	13.5	4.0	-	5.5	1.8	3.0	16.5	7.7	-	9.5
16–23 November 2015	22.4	10.6	7.0	9.1	14.6	3.5	-	5.6	2.0	2.3	14.6	8.3	-	7.8
Preceding elections
Result	Parties										Invalid votes, %		Turnout, %	Lead, %
Result	LSDP	TS-KD	DP	TT	LRLS	LLRA	DK	LVŽS	ŽP	Other	Invalid votes, %		Turnout, %	Lead, %
Seats	38	33	29	11	10	8	7	1	-	3	4.2		52.9	5
PR vote, %	18.4	15.1	19.9	7.3	8.6	5.8	8.0	3.9	-	8.9	4.2		52.9	1.5

== Politicians not standing ==
- Stasys Brundza (DK)
- Povilas Gylys (DK)
- Jonas Kondrotas (DP)
- Kazimieras Kuzminskas (TS–LKD)
- Vytautas Matulevičius (DK)
- Aurelija Stancikienė (DK)
- Vitalija Vonžutaitė (DP)
- Pranas Žeimys (TS–LKD)

== Campaign ==
=== Announcement ===
On 7 April 2016 the President of Lithuania, Dalia Grybauskaitė, officially announced 9 October 2016 as the election date. The announcement, which came into effect on 9 April 2016, launched the election campaign, allowing the potential participants to register for the elections, raise funds and campaign in public.

=== Campaign financing ===
In January 2016, the Central Electoral Commission announced the spending limits for political campaigns in 2016. A party participating in the elections in the nationwide constituency could spend a total of 770 thousand euros on the campaign. Participants in the election races in single-seat constituencies could spend between 18 and 22 thousand euros, depending on the size of the constituency. As a result, a political party with candidates in every single-seat constituency could spend just over 2.2 million euros on its election campaign.

Only citizens of Lithuania could contribute financially to the election campaigns. Each citizen could contribute up to 7,570 euros to a candidate, as long as their total contributions during the year did not exceed 10% of their stated annual income. A candidate could contribute up to 15,140 euros to their own election campaign.

=== Participating parties ===
23 political parties were eligible to participate in the elections, having submitted their membership rolls before 1 March 2016, in compliance with legal requirements. 16 political parties registered for the elections before the deadline on 5 August 2016. 12 of them participated in the elections independently, while the remaining 4 formed two separate electoral coalitions, bringing the total number of electoral lists to 14, down from 18 in 2012. The electoral lists were assigned numbers in a random draw on 25 August.

Number	Party / Electoral list		Leader		Ideology	European affiliation	Current seats
Number	Party / Electoral list		Party	Electoral list	Ideology	European affiliation	Current seats
1	Social Democratic Party of Lithuania		Algirdas Butkevičius		Social democracy	Party of European Socialists	40
2	Homeland Union-Lithuanian Christian Democrats		Gabrielius Landsbergis		Christian democracy, conservative liberalism	European People's Party	30
3	Lithuanian Freedom Union (Liberals)		Artūras Zuokas		Conservative liberalism	Alliance of Liberals and Democrats for Europe	-
4	Coalition of S. Buškevičius and the Nationalists "Against corruption and poverty"	Young Lithuania	Stanislovas Buškevičius	Stanislovas Buškevičius	Nationalism, right-wing populism	none	-
4	Coalition of S. Buškevičius and the Nationalists "Against corruption and poverty"	Lithuanian Nationalist Union	Audrius Rudys	Stanislovas Buškevičius	Nationalism, national conservatism, right-wing populism	none	-
5	Order and Justice		Rolandas Paksas	Remigijus Žemaitaitis	Nationalism, national conservatism, soft euroscepticism	Alliance for Direct Democracy in Europe	9
6	Lithuanian Farmers and Greens Union		Ramūnas Karbauskis	Saulius Skvernelis	Green politics, agrarianism, Christian democracy, national conservatism	none	1
7	Liberal Movement		Remigijus Šimašius	Eugenijus Gentvilas	Liberalism, classical liberalism	Alliance of Liberals and Democrats for Europe	12
8	Labour Party		Valentinas Mazuronis	Kęstutis Daukšys	Social liberalism, populism, centrism	Alliance of Liberals and Democrats for Europe	27
9	The Way of Courage		Jonas Varkala		Anti-corruption, populism	none	7
10	Lithuanian People's Party		Rolandas Paulauskas		Russophilia, Right-wing populism, nationalism	none	-
11	Electoral Action of Poles in Lithuania - Christian Families Alliance		Valdemar Tomaševski	Rita Tamašunienė	Polish minority interests, Christian democracy, euroscepticism	Alliance of European Conservatives and Reformists	8
12	Lithuanian Green Party		Linas Balsys		Green politics, left liberalism	none	1
13	Political Party "Lithuanian List"		Darius Kuolys		Centrism, anti-austerity politics	none	-
14	Anti-corruption coalition of Kristupas Krivickas and Naglis Puteikis	Lithuanian Centre Party	Naglis Puteikis	Naglis Puteikis	Nationalism, euroscepticism	none	-
14	Anti-corruption coalition of Kristupas Krivickas and Naglis Puteikis	Lithuanian Pensioners' Party	Vytautas Jurgis Kadžys	Naglis Puteikis	Social justice, elders' interest	none	-

Over the year preceding the elections, six political parties consistently polled above the 5 percent threshold for seats in the nationwide constituency: Social Democrats, Homeland Union, Liberal Movement, Farmers and Greens Union, Labour, and Order and Justice.

After their election victory in 2012, the Social Democrats led the governing coalition, with Algirdas Butkevičius as Prime Minister. Butkevičius, his government and the Social Democrats maintained very high approval ratings among the public and performed well in the elections to the European parliament in 2014 (where they finished a close second) and the municipal elections in 2015 (where they won the most mandates and mayoral posts). Their ratings suffered in 2016, damaged by a corruption scandal related to construction in protected areas near Druskininkai, but the Social Democrats remained the most popular party according to opinion polls. The electoral program of the party was focused on spreading the benefits of the growing economy by increasing salaries and retirement benefits.

Homeland Union was the largest opposition party in the Eleventh Seimas. Andrius Kubilius, who had led the first government in modern Lithuanian history to survive a full term in office, did not seek another term as leader of the party. In 2015 he was replaced by Gabrielius Landsbergis, the grandson of the patriarch of the party, Vytautas Landsbergis. The party surprised political observers by winning the largest share of the vote in the European Parliament elections in 2014 and tended to outperform the opinion polls due to the higher participation rate among their supporters. The program of the party promised higher quality public services and reduced bureaucratic waste, new well-paid employment opportunities and improved public education.

The Liberal Movement had emerged as one of the main political forces in Lithuania, finishing a close third in the European Parliament elections in 2014 and the municipal elections in 2015. Until May 2016, the party was consistently the second most popular party in opinion polls (behind only the Social Democrats) and was seen as the most likely coalition partner for both the Social Democrats and Homeland Union. The party lost most of its support after its leader, Eligijus Masiulis, was accused of taking a substantial bribe from one of the leading business groups in the country. Masiulis promptly resigned and was eventually replaced by the mayor of Vilnius, Remigijus Šimašius. As part of its platform, the party proposed a smaller government, lower taxes (especially VAT) and more flexible labor relationships. The party also expressed support for same-sex unions in Lithuania.

Lithuanian Peasant Popular Union rebranded itself as the Lithuanian Farmers and Greens Union (LVŽS) in 2012. Led by businessman Ramūnas Karbauskis, the party received 6.6% of the vote in the European Parliament elections in 2014, earning a single mandate, and emerged as a dark horse in the electoral race in the spring of 2016. The rise of LVŽS was attributed to the popularity of Karbauskis, who had been active in campaigning against alcohol, and their lack of involvement in political scandals. LVŽS was further boosted by the announcement that Saulius Skvernelis, a Minister of Interior in Butkevičius Cabinet and one of the most popular politicians in Lithuania, would head the party's electoral list in the elections, without joining the party. Before the elections, the party ruled out the possibility of participating in a ruling coalition which involved Labour or Order and Justice.

The Labour Party was led in the elections by Valentinas Mazuronis, an MEP who had originally been elected to the European Parliament on the electoral list of Order and Justice. Labour was the second-largest party in Lithuania in terms of members, but had been plagued by accusations of fraudulent bookkeeping, and by the departure of its founder Viktor Uspaskich. Before the elections, the party promised to fight the influx of refugees into the country, despite the number of refugees actually settled in Lithuania being in single digits. The party also proposed higher pensions and minimum wage, a higher non-taxable allowance, reduced VAT rates on food and medicine and one-off payouts to those reaching the age of maturity.

Order and Justice, led by the former President of Lithuania Rolandas Paksas, was also involved in a corruption scandal before the elections. Paksas, who is barred from being elected to the Seimas, was suspected of accepting a bribe from Gedvydas Vainauskas, a media magnate, in exchange for favors related to construction permits. The party proposed to link salaries and pensions to an inflation index, to exempt reinvested profits from corporate income taxes and to create new employment opportunities. Generous payments on childbirth were proposed to address demographic issues.

In total, 1416 candidates competed for Seimas seats in the elections, with 673 participating in the electoral races in single-seat constituencies.

=== Debates ===
As before every elections, televised debates took place on the national television channel. The debates took place over 4 weeks from 13 September to 6 October. Representatives from the 14 electoral lists were split into three groups for each week of debates, debating on different days of the week on the same topic. The topics for the four weeks of debates were: economy, demographics, justice and social policy. The parties were mostly represented by the leaders of their electoral lists, with support from other members.

In May 2016, five political parties (the Social Democrats, the Liberal Movement, the Homeland Union, Labour and the Farmers and Greens Union) agreed to participate in the debates together, leaving out Order and Justice. The agreement remained in place even after the corruption scandal involving the leader of the Liberal Movement, Eligijus Masiulis, and the subsequent slide in the party's ratings.

Topic: Economy
13 September	14 September	15 September
Order and Justice; Green Party; Electoral action of Poles; Lithuanian Liberty Union; Coalition of S. Buškevičius and the Nationalists	Liberal Movement; Social Democrats; Homeland Union; Farmers and Greens Union; Labour Party	The Way of Courage; Lithuanian List; People's Party; Coalition of N. Puteikis and K. Krivickas

The main party debate on economy took place on 14 September 2016. Prime Minister Butkevičius and Gabrielius Landsbergis of the Homeland Union clashed over the responsibility for the high poverty rate, while all parties identified what they saw as the main issues facing the economy. Kęstutis Daukšys of the Labour Party reiterated the promise from the party's electoral program to increase the salaries and pensions while Saulius Skvernelis, representing the Farmers and Greens Union, labeled such promises as populism and proposed to remove it from political decision making by indexing the minimum wage and pensions to economic indicators. At the same time Skvernelis proposed and Landsbergis supported reforms to the system of personal taxation, while Eugenijus Gentvilas of the Liberal Movement proposed wide-ranging tax cuts, having asserted that high taxes are one of the main stumbling blocks for economic progress in the country. Experts polled by the National Television judged the debates as a marginal victory for Butkevičius and Social Democrats.

Topic: Demographics
20 September	21 September	22 September
Coalition of S. Buškevičius and the Nationalists; Lithuanian List; People's Party; Coalition of N. Puteikis and K. Krivickas	Order and Justice; Green Party; Electoral action of Poles; Lithuanian Liberty Union; The Way of Courage	Liberal Movement; Social Democrats; Homeland Union; Farmers and Greens Union; Labour Party

The main party debate on demographics took place on 22 September 2016. Butkevičius defended the Social Democrats' record in government, which was attacked by the Homeland Union. All parties proposed reforms to the education sector and other measures they see as necessary to reverse the emigration trends. Experts polled by the National Television judged the debates as a marginal victory for Homeland Union, represented by Landsbergis, with Farmers and Greens, represented by Skvernelis, in a close second place. An improved performance from Skvernelis, compared to the first debate, was noted.

Topic: Justice
27 September	28 September	29 September
Order and Justice; Green Party; Electoral action of Poles; Lithuanian Liberty Union; The Way of Courage	Coalition of S. Buškevičius and the Nationalists; Lithuanian List; People's Party; Coalition of N. Puteikis and K. Krivickas	Liberal Movement; Social Democrats; Homeland Union; Farmers and Greens Union; Labour Party

The main party debate on justice took place on 29 September 2016. Experts polled by the National Television judged the debates as a marginal victory for Farmers and Greens, represented by Skvernelis, closely followed by the Homeland Union. Social Democrats, on the other hand, were criticized for failing to propose new ideas, instead of pointing out how situation was already improving.

Topic: Social policy
4 October	5 October	6 October
Coalition of S. Buškevičius and the Nationalists; Lithuanian List; People's Party; Coalition of N. Puteikis and K. Krivickas	Order and Justice; Green Party; Electoral action of Poles; Lithuanian Liberty Union; The Way of Courage	Liberal Movement; Social Democrats; Homeland Union; Farmers and Greens Union; Labour Party

The main party debate on social policy took place on 6 October 2016. Candidates presented their positions on social issues and health. At the end of the debate the representatives gave their final statements to voters. Experts polled by the National Television criticized the lack of substantial proposals for reforms in the debate, but judged Farmers and Greens to have performed most convincingly. Homeland Union again finished close second, with Landsbergis' final speech considered as the most successful.

== Results ==
The election was a surprise victory for Farmers and Greens Union, which won 54 seats in the parliament, after failing to clear the electoral threshold of 5% and winning just one seat in the preceding elections. Including the two candidates that won their single-member constituencies as independents but ran on the party's electoral list in the nationwide constituency, this represented the largest tally by any party in Lithuania in 20 years. Analysts attributed the victory to the desire by the electorate to see new faces in the parliament, in light of low wages and rampant emigration.

Homeland Union won the largest share of the vote (22.63%) and 20 mandates in the nationwide constituency, improving on their result from 2012. However, a disappointing performance in single-member constituencies, where they picked up only 11 seats, left the party a distant second with 31 seats, two fewer than in the previous elections.

Government parties suffered a major setback in the elections. Social Democrats, who had been leading the polls consistently since the previous elections, finished third with 15.04% of the vote and 17 seats. Order and Justice finished with 5.72% and 8 seats (down from 7.63% and 11 seats), while Labour Party, which had led the popular vote in the elections of 2012, failed to clear the electoral threshold for proportionally allocated seats and picked up only two seats in single-member constituencies. The failure of government parties has been attributed to sluggish economic growth, scandals that had surfaced over the months preceding the elections and the adoption of a new labour code that was deeply unpopular with voters.

Algirdas Butkevičius, who was serving as the Prime Minister, lost his single-member constituency that he had held since 1996.

Party or alliance		Proportional			Constituency (first round)			Constituency (second round)			Total seats	+/–
Party or alliance		Votes	%	Seats	Votes	%	Seats	Votes	%	Seats	Total seats	+/–
Homeland Union		276,275	22.63	20	258,835	21.57	1	247,920	28.06	10	31	–2
Lithuanian Farmers and Greens Union		274,108	22.45	19	229,769	19.15	0	311,611	35.27	35	54	+53
Social Democratic Party of Lithuania		183,597	15.04	13	183,267	15.27	0	115,576	13.08	4	17	–21
Liberal Movement		115,361	9.45	8	139,522	11.63	0	70,891	8.02	6	14	+4
Anti-Corruption; Coalition	Lithuanian Centre Party	77,114	6.32	0	36,621	3.05	0	6,876	0.78	1	1	New
Anti-Corruption; Coalition	Lithuanian Pensioners' Party	77,114	6.32	0							0	New
Electoral Action of Poles in Lithuania		69,810	5.72	5	63,291	5.27	2	13,526	1.53	1	8	0
Order and Justice		67,817	5.55	5	70,958	5.91	0	28,894	3.27	3	8	–3
Labour Party		59,620	4.88	0	79,824	6.65	0	25,803	2.92	2	2	–27
Lithuanian Freedom Union (Liberals)		27,274	2.23	0	39,987	3.33	0	10,130	1.15	0	0	New
Lithuanian Green Party		24,727	2.03	0	11,047	0.92	0	5,627	0.64	1	1	New
Lithuanian List		21,966	1.80	0	17,519	1.46	0	8,709	0.99	1	1	New
Lithuanian People's Party		12,851	1.05	0	9,767	0.81	0				0	0
Against Corruption and Poverty	Young Lithuania	6,867	0.56	0	2,628	0.22	0				0	0
Against Corruption and Poverty	Lithuanian Nationalist and Republican Union	6,867	0.56	0	1,522	0.13	0				0	New
The Way of Courage		3,498	0.29	0	4,619	0.38	0				0	–7
Independents					50,738	4.23	0	37,919	4.29	4	4	+1
Total		1,220,885	100.00	70	1,199,914	100.00	3	883,482	100.00	68	141	0
Valid votes		1,220,885	95.88		1,199,914	94.28		883,482	96.41			
Invalid/blank votes		52,469	4.12		72,788	5.72		32,937	3.59			
Total votes		1,273,354	100.00		1,272,702	100.00		916,419	100.00			
Registered voters/turnout		2,514,657	50.64		2,514,657	50.61		2,405,143	38.10			
Source: VRK, CLEA

Single-member constituencies – seats won in the first round

Single-member constituencies – first place after the first round

Single-member constituencies – seats won after the second round

=== Preference votes ===
Alongside votes for a party, voters were able to cast a preferential votes for a candidate on the party list.

Party	Pos.	Candidate	Votes
Homeland Union – Lithuanian Christian Democrats	1	Gabrielius Landsbergis	132,227
Homeland Union – Lithuanian Christian Democrats	4	Ingrida Šimonytė	118,263
Lithuanian Farmers and Greens Union	1	Saulius Skvernelis	116,550
Lithuanian Farmers and Greens Union	2	Ramūnas Karbauskis	111,525
Homeland Union – Lithuanian Christian Democrats	3	Andrius Kubilius	72,731
Homeland Union – Lithuanian Christian Democrats	2	Irena Degutienė	66,723
Social Democratic Party of Lithuania	1	Algirdas Butkevičius	63,558
Homeland Union – Lithuanian Christian Democrats	5	Agnė Bilotaitė	50,983
Lithuanian Farmers and Greens Union	3	Rima Baškienė	41,819
Liberal Movement	1	Eugenijus Gentvilas	41,408

== Aftermath ==
Soon after the results of the first round of voting were clear, Mazuronis resigned as the leader of the Labour Party, while Paksas resigned as the leader of Order and Justice. After the second round of voting, Butkevičius also offered his resignation as the chairman of the Social Democrats, but his resignation was rejected. However, Butkevičius ruled out standing for reelection as the chairman in 2017. Landsbergis announced new leadership election in the Homeland Union in early 2017.

Soon after the election results became clear, the victorious Farmers and Greens started coalition consultations with Homeland Union and the Social Democrats. Farmers and Greens expressed their desire for a broad coalition involving both parties, a concept that Homeland Union ruled out. On 9 November, Farmers and Greens signed a coalition agreement with the Social Democrats, under which the Social Democrats would be allocated 3 of the 14 seats in the cabinet, while Farmers and Greens got the right to nominate the prime minister and the speaker of the Seimas.

The newly elected Twelfth Seimas convened for its first session on 14 November 2016 and elected Viktoras Pranckietis as the Speaker of the Seimas. On 22 November, President Dalia Grybauskaitė appointed Saulius Skvernelis as the prime minister.
