= Lithuanian List =

Political Party "Lithuanian List" Politinė partija „Lietuvos sąrašas“
- Abbreviation: PPLS
- Leader: Darius Kuolys
- Founded: 5 July 2012
- Headquarters: Literatų g. 5, Vilnius
- Membership (2025): 1,994
- Ideology: Anti-establishment politics
- Colours: Crimson
- Seimas: 0 / 141
- European Parliament: 0 / 12
- Municipal councils: 0 / 1,526

Website
- www.lietuvossarasas.lt

The Political Party "Lithuanian List" (Lithuanian: Politinė partija „Lietuvos sąrašas“) is an anti-establishment, anti-corruption political party in Lithuania. It was represented in the Lithuanian unicameral legislature, Seimas, from 2016 to 2019.

== History ==
=== Foundation ===
The party emerged from 2012 protests against corruption in the Lithuanian justice system after the dismissal of the chairman of the Financial Crime Investigation Service by interior minister Raimundas Palaitis. The leader of the protests was former Minister of Education and TV host Darius Kuolys. Together with Valdas Vasiliauskas, the former chief editor of Lietuvos žinios, who claimed to have been dismissed after pressure from President Dalia Grybauskaitė, as well as other founding members, he established the Lithuanian List on 5 July 2012. It described itself as an "nonpartisan party" and sought to fight against what it described as "party nomenklatura".

Soon after foundation, it grew close to the Way of Courage, another anti-establishment party established in 2012 after a scandal in the Lithuanian justice system - the case of Drąsius Kedys. It did not run in the 2012 parliamentary election. Members of the party ran on the Way of Courage electoral list, including Valdas Vasiliauskas, who subsequently left the party.

The party won four seats on the municipal council of Vilnius in the 2015 municipal election, where their list was joined by economist Aušra Maldeikienė and Member of the Seimas Naglis Puteikis, who had left the Homeland Union the year prior. However, this was short-lived, as Puteikis chose to establish the "Anti-Corruption Coalition" with Kristupas Krivickas and the Lithuanian Centre Party instead.

In the 2016 parliamentary election, the party finished tenth with 1.80 percent of the vote. Maldeikienė was elected to parliament in the single-seat constituency of Žirmūnai, however, she was not a member of the party.

=== Decline ===
In 2017, the Electoral Commission reported that the party had violated electoral law by taking a loan from a private individual during the 2016 electoral campaign - even though, according to law, parties are only allowed to take loans from banks.

The party intended to run in the 2019 municipal elections, but did not register as an election participant in time. According to Kuolys, this was the result of a "human error", as the party's secretary was exhausted by work and had misinterpreted the date. In the same year, the party lost its only Member of the Seimas, as Maldeikienė chose to run in the 2019 European Parliament election with an independent electoral committee, "Aušra Maldeikienė's Train" (Lithuanian: Visuomeninis komitetas „Aušros Maldeikienės traukinys“), and was elected.

In the early 2020s, the party had effectively ceased formal activities, failing to submit membership data in four out of five mandatory reporting periods between 2023 and 2025. It missed out on the 2023 Lithuanian municipal elections as a result. On 3 October 2023, the Electoral Commission announced the initiation of the party's liquidation due to its failure to provide a list of members consecutively for both periods of 2023. While it corrected this for the following reporting period, passing the members threshold by two people, the party was still unable to field candidates in any of the three 2024 Lithuanian elections, having again failed to submit the required data before them. In the summer of 2025, it eventually avoided being disestablished by providing membership information to the Ministry of Justice.

== Ideology ==
The Lithuanian List described itself as a "nonpartisan party" and did not define itself with a political ideology, mainly expressing opposition to the party establishment and political corruption. It declared its intent to "restore the democratic Republic of Lithuania". In its "List of Tasks for Lithuania" (Lithuanian: Lietuvos darbų sąrašas), it demanded to turn the Seimas into a "representation of the Nation", replace the parallel voting system with pure first-past-the-post voting, establish nonpartisan councils of experts in every Seimas committee, and reform the justice system and the State Security Department of Lithuania.

Most of the party's votes came from Vilnius. According to political scientist Matas Baltrukevičius, it represents the same electorate as the National Alliance.

== Election results ==
=== Seimas ===
Election	Votes (Note: Proportional representation votes.)	%	Seats	+/–	Government
2016	21,966	1.80 (#10)	1 / 141	-	Opposition
2020	-	-	0 / 141	▼1	Extra-parliamentary

=== Municipal ===
Election	Votes (Note: Municipal council election votes.)	%	Council seats	Mayors	+/–
2015	14,572	1.31 (#10)	4 / 1,416	0 / 60	-
2019	-	-	0 / 1,442	0 / 60	▼4
