= Butkevičius Cabinet =

- 2012–2016
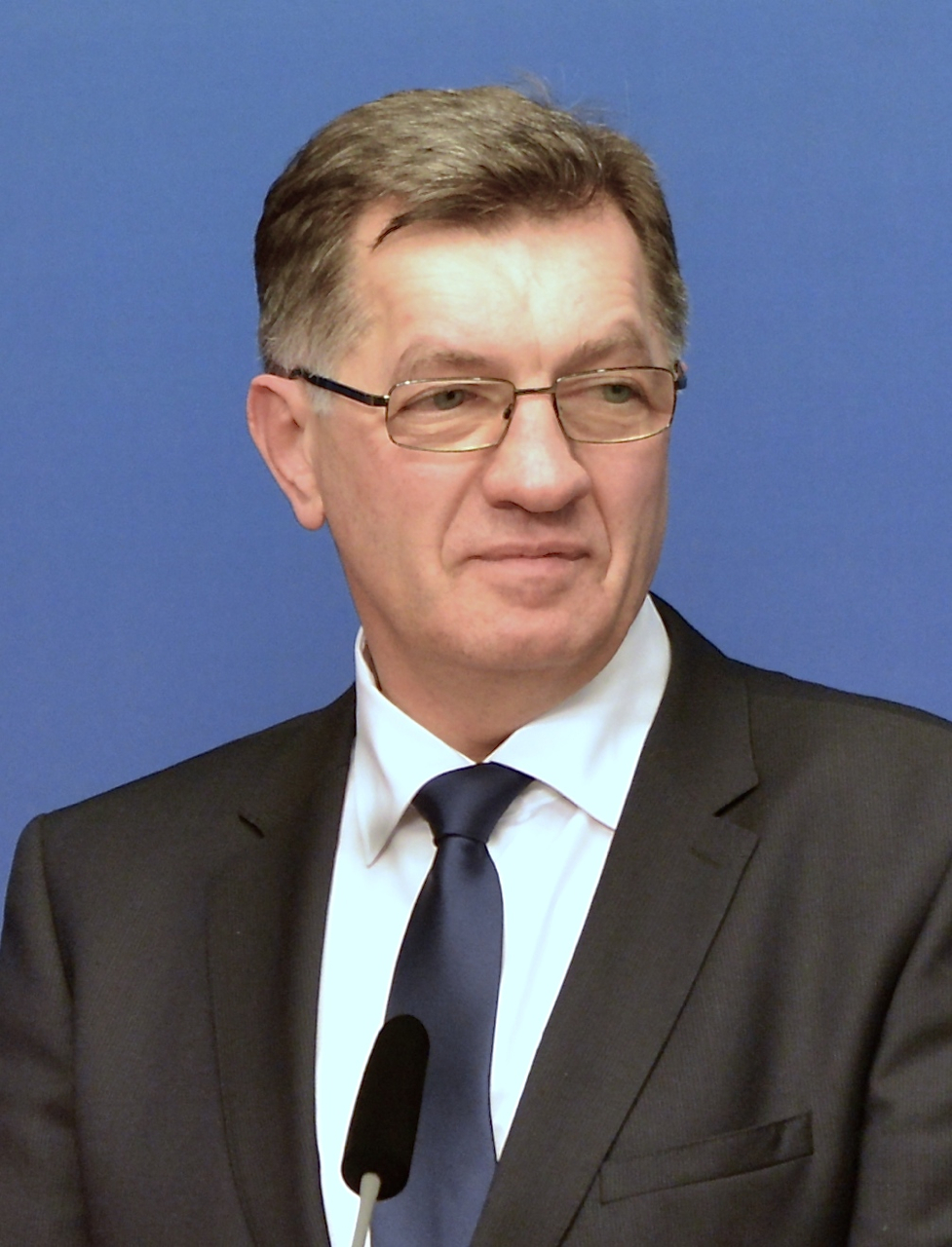
- Date formed: December 13, 2012
- Date dissolved: December 13, 2016

People and organisations
- Head of state: Dalia Grybauskaitė
- Head of government: Algirdas Butkevičius
- Member parties: Social Democratic Party of Lithuania; Labour Party; Order and Justice; Electoral Action of Poles in Lithuania (2012–2014)
- Status in legislature: Majority coalition government
- Opposition parties: Homeland Union – Lithuanian Christian Democrats; Liberal Movement; Electoral Action of Poles in Lithuania (2014–2016)
- Opposition leader: Andrius Kubilius

History
- Election: 2012
- Legislature term: Eleventh Seimas
- Predecessor: Kubilius Cabinet II
- Successor: Skvernelis Cabinet

The Butkevičius Cabinet was the 16th cabinet of Lithuania since 1990. It consisted of the Prime Minister, who was the Head of Government, and 14 government ministers from the Social Democratic Party of Lithuania, the Labour Party, the Order and Justice, as well as the Electoral Action of Poles in Lithuania until it left the coalition in 2014.

== History ==
After the parliamentary elections in 2012, President Dalia Grybauskaitė appointed Algirdas Butkevičius, leader of the Social Democratic Party of Lithuania, as the Prime Minister on 26 November 2012. The cabinet received its mandate on 13 December 2012. At that time, the ministers in the Butkevičius Cabinet had the highest average age of all the cabinets in the independent Lithuanian history, with the average age of its members exceeding 54 years.

It initially consisted of four parties (Social Democratic Party of Lithuania, the Labour Party, the Order and Justice, and the Electoral Action of Poles in Lithuania), but the Electoral Action of Poles left the government in August 2014.

The Butkevičius cabinet became the second successive government of Lithuania to serve the full four-year term of the Seimas, returning its mandate on 14 November 2016 after the elections to the Seimas that October. This government was the first one to retain its majority in the Seimas throughout the full four year term. The government continued to serve in an acting capacity after the 2016 elections until the Skvernelis Cabinet took office on 13 December 2016.

== Cabinet ==
Position	Name	Party	From	To
Prime Minister	Algirdas Butkevičius	Social Democratic Party of Lithuania	December 13, 2012	December 13, 2016
Education and Science	Dainius Pavalkis	Labour Party	December 13, 2012	May 11, 2015
Education and Science	Audronė Pitrėnienė	Labour Party	June 2, 2015	December 13, 2016
Energy	Jarosław Niewierowicz	Independent (endorsed by LLRA)	December 13, 2012	August 25, 2014
Energy	Rokas Masiulis	Independent (endorsed by DP)	September 25, 2014	December 13, 2016
Finance	Rimantas Šadžius	Social Democratic Party of Lithuania	December 13, 2012	June 15, 2016
Finance	Rasa Budbergytė	Social Democratic Party of Lithuania	June 23, 2016	December 13, 2016
Economy	Birutė Vėsaitė	Social Democratic Party of Lithuania	December 13, 2012	June 3, 2013
Economy	Evaldas Gustas	Social Democratic Party of Lithuania	June 11, 2013	December 13, 2016
Transport	Rimantas Sinkevičius	Social Democratic Party of Lithuania	December 13, 2012	December 13, 2016
Culture	Šarūnas Birutis	Labour Party	December 13, 2012	December 13, 2016
Defence	Juozas Olekas	Social Democratic Party of Lithuania	December 13, 2012	December 13, 2016
Social Security and Labour	Algimanta Pabedinskienė	Labour Party	December 13, 2012	December 13, 2016
Agriculture	Vigilijus Jukna	Labour Party	December 13, 2012	July 11, 2014
Agriculture	Virginija Baltraitienė	Labour Party	July 17, 2014	December 13, 2016
Interior	Dailis Alfonsas Barakauskas	Order and Justice	December 13, 2012	October 30, 2014
Interior	Saulius Skvernelis	Independent (endorsed by TT)	November 11, 2014	April 13, 2016
Interior	Tomas Žilinskas	Independent (endorsed by TT)	April 13, 2016	December 13, 2016
Foreign Affairs	Linas Antanas Linkevičius	Social Democratic Party of Lithuania	December 13, 2012	December 13, 2016
Justice	Juozas Bernatonis	Social Democratic Party of Lithuania	December 13, 2012	December 13, 2016
Environment	Valentinas Mazuronis	Order and Justice	December 13, 2012	June 15, 2014
Environment	Kęstutis Trečiokas	Order and Justice	July 17, 2014	December 13, 2016
Health	Vytenis Andriukaitis	Social Democratic Party of Lithuania	December 13, 2012	July 10, 2014
Health	Rimantė Šalaševičiūtė	Social Democratic Party of Lithuania	July 17, 2014	February 17, 2016
Health	Juras Požela	Social Democratic Party of Lithuania	March 10, 2016	16 October 2016 †
