= Vanda Kravčionok =

Lithuanian politician

Member of the Seimas
- In office 2012–2020

Personal details
- Born: 6 August 1969 (age 57) Šilėnai, Lithuanian SSR, USSR
- Party: Electoral Action of Poles in Lithuania – Christian Families Alliance
- Education: University of Humanities and Economics in Lodz

Vanda Kravčionok (Polish: Wanda Krawczonok, born 6 August 1969) is a politician from the Electoral Action of Poles in Lithuania and a member of the Eleventh and Twelfth Seimas of Lithuania. She is the deputy chairperson of the Electoral Action of Poles in Lithuania – Christian Families Alliance group.

== Early life ==
Vanda Kravčionok was born in Vilnius District Municipality's Šilėnai village on 6 August 1969.

== Career ==
From 1987 to 1991, Kravčionok was an operator at the manufacturing plant of AB Plasta. She joined the Union of Lithuanian Poles and the Electoral Action of Poles in Lithuania in 1994. Five years later, she became a treasurer of the latter and joined the Vilnius City Municipal Council in 2007. Prior to that, she worked as an assistant secretary to Waldemar Tomaszewski.

In 2012, she became the deputy-chairperson of Electoral Action of Poles in Lithuania – Christian Families Alliance and entered the Seimas, the Lithuanian parliament, following the 2012 Lithuanian parliamentary election. She was a member of the Committee on State Administration and Local Authorities and Anticorruption Commission. She was re-elected to the Twelfth Seimas in 2016. In 2023, she was re-elected to the Vilnius City Municipal Council.
