= Case of Drąsius Kedys =

Criminal case in Lithuania

Kedys

The Drąsius Kedys case is a high-profile criminal case in Lithuania centering on allegations of sexual molestation of two Lithuanian girls and a double homicide. In November 2008, Drąsius Kedys accused Laimutė Stankūnaitė of allowing Jonas Furmanavičius and Andrius Ūsas to sexually molest their underage daughter. Frustrated by lack of progress in the investigation, Kedys took the case public. He published a video with his daughter's testimony, sent out DVDs to politicians, and appeared in the media. Still no case was brought before trial. In October 2009, Jonas Furmanavičius, a district judge and accused pedophile, and Violeta Naruševičienė, aunt of his daughter and accused procurer, were found dead and Kedys became the main murder suspect. While Kedys went into hiding, some of the Lithuanian public sided with him, portraying Kedys as a desperate father trying to protect his daughter against pedophiles. In April 2010 his body was found near Kaunas Reservoir. His death was ruled an accident – choking on vomit after heavy drinking. The main suspect in the pedophilia case, Andrius Ūsas, was found drowned in a lake after a motorcycle accident in June 2010. In a posthumous trial Ūsas was found innocent. A separate court ruling restored the girl's custody to Stankūnaitė. Some Lithuanians disagreed with the ruling and began a vigil at the house of Kedys' relatives in Garliava, where the girl lived at the time. Officials were able to take custody of the girl with the help of riot police in May 2012. The Way of Courage, a political party founded by Kedys' sister and supporters, participated in the 2012 Lithuanian parliamentary election and received almost 8% of the votes.

== Pedophile scandal ==
Drąsius Kedys (born 4 September 1972 in Garliava) and his former girlfriend Laimutė Stankūnaitė (born 1986) had a daughter in February 2004. Stankūnaitė was underage when she gave birth to Kedys' daughter. The couple split in 2006 and the parents got embroiled in a bitter custody battle. His former girlfriend, with the help from Andrius Ūsas, a politician and advisor to the former Speaker of the Seimas Viktoras Muntianas, obtained custody in November 2006. Kedys had visitation rights every other weekend. But later Stankunaite gave up her custody rights, giving them to the father.

On 29 November 2008 Kedys submitted a formal complaint to the police, claiming Ūsas paid Stankūnaitė to sexually molest his daughter. On this basis, in December 2008, Kedys obtained full custody of his daughter with no visitation rights for Stankūnaitė. The courts repeatedly confirmed that Stankūnaitė had no case to answer, thus dismissing Kedys' allegations against his former girlfriend as unsubstantiated. The pre-trial investigation against Ūsas continued. In February 2009, Kedys further pressed accusations against Violeta Naruševičienė, Stankūnaitė's sister, claiming the former had participated with allowing men to molest her 4-year-old daughter. In July 2009, Kedys accused Jonas Furmanavičius, a district judge, and an individual known as Aidas of partaking in the molestation. All of those people (except for Aidas) professed their innocence, and accused Kedys of slander, criminal libel, and death threats.

Frustrated with the apparent lack of progress in official investigations and convinced that the case was being deliberately stonewalled, Kedys sent out 200 DVDs to Lithuanian politicians, media outlets, and law-enforcement agencies, featuring homemade video footage of his daughter's explicit testimony against three "uncles". He promised to send the subtitled version to Members of the European Parliament. Many sources criticized Kedys, who acted as the cameraman, for asking his daughter leading questions and heavily editing the film (it contained 50 segments filmed across nine occasions).

== Double homicide ==
On 5 October 2009 Furmanavičius and Naruševičienė were shot dead in Kaunas. Kedys became the prime suspect. On the same day, a national search of Kedys was announced, soon followed by an announcement of an international search, as he was thought to have left the country shortly after the murders. Kedys' friends Raimundas Ivanauskas and Eglė Barauskaitė were charged with accessory to murder. As of December 2013, that court case is ongoing.

The story caused an uproar in Lithuania, with much of the public siding with Kedys: in the public mind, the case was seen as largely a father's futile attempts in pursuing justice and trying to protect his daughter, and being driven to desperate measures by anger at the injustice. Others questioned whether the killings were in fact commissioned by Kedys himself.

== Death of Kedys ==
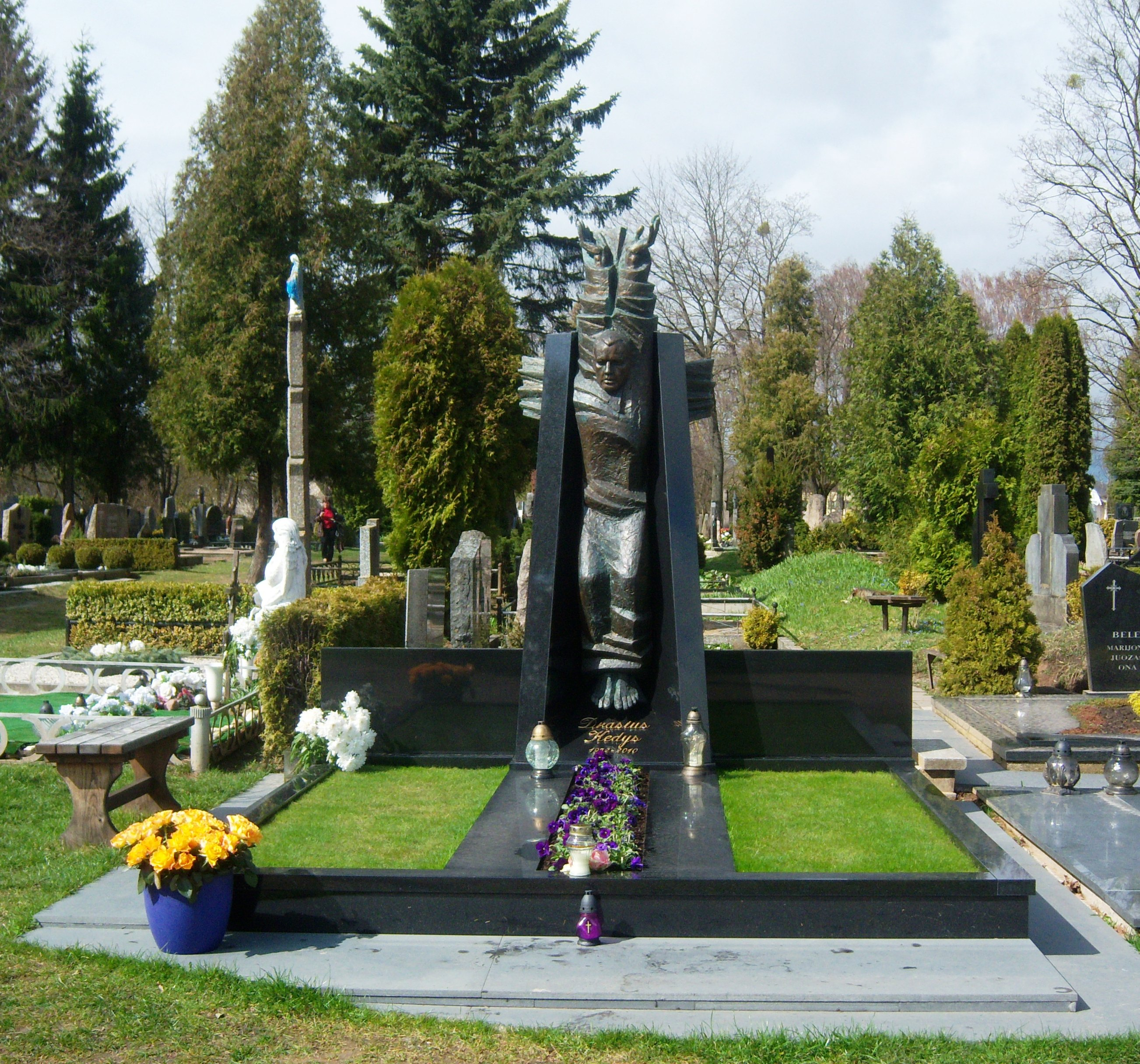
Tombstone of Drąsius Kedys in Jonučiai cemetery

On April 17, 2010, 6:49 AM, after six months of the police search, Drąsius Kedys' body was found near Kaunas Reservoir by an angler. An autopsy concluded he had died between an evening of April 15 and morning of 16th. According to the official report, the cause of death was "choking on vomit" whilst being heavily intoxicated. However, his relatives were convinced that Kedys was murdered, pointing out wounds on his body. Kedys' relatives demanded a second opinion from independent experts. In April 2011, a report was received from the Swedish National Forensic Service (Rättsmedicinalverket) confirming Kedys had died from alcohol and drug poisoning, and that he choked on the contents of his own stomach. The Swedish report differed from the Lithuanian experts in determining "the injuries on the body appeared before his death" and that the "possibility of drowning is not excluded".

On 24 April, Kedys was buried in Jonučiai cemetery. According to media reports, 6–10,000 people from across the country attended the ceremony.

== Death of Ūsas ==
Ūsas, the main suspect in the pedophilia case, was officially charged with the sexual molestation of a minor. However, he was found drowned in a swamp in June 2010. The death was ruled an accident. The court case against Ūsas continued. The court found him innocent in November 2012.

== Custody battle ==
On 17 May 2012, following a court order, Kedys' daughter, who was previously living with Kedys' relatives in Garliava, was forcibly reunited with her mother Stankūnaitė. Owing to the continuous presence of protesters disagreeing with the 5-month old court decision, the operation was carried out with the assistance of riot police, and 39 protesters were detained.

== Aftermath ==
The sister of Drąsius Kedys Neringa Venckienė was elected to the Lithuanian Parliament, but fled the country for the United States after the Parliament removed her legal immunity in 2013. In November 2019, she was extradited back to Lithuania and was brought to the Court under four criminal charges.

== In popular culture ==
A children magazine Flintas created a comic named Gynėjas Drąsius (Drąsius the Defender), inspired by the story of the deceased Drąsius Kedys.

The protest events in Garliava was depicted in a 2013 opinion journalism documentary movie Lost. A political animal of the European Union.

In 2013, the pedophilia case was recreated in a popular Korean mystery TV show "Surprise Mystery".

As of 2022 Lithuanian director Jonas Vaitkus was creating a play based on Kedys case, titled "Clan".

The case was portrayed in the Lithuanian television show The Price of Courage. It was aired by TV3 and had 86 episodes.
