= Matulevičius =

- Lithuanian surname
- m.: Matulevičius
- f.: (unmarried): Matulevičiūtė
- f.: (married): Matulevičienė
- Related names: Polish: Matulewicz; Russian: Matulevich

Matulevičius is a Lithuanian-language surname of East Slavic origin, as identified by the patronymic suffix -ičius corresponding to the East Slavic -ich.

The surname may refer to:

- Deivydas Matulevičius (born 1989), Lithuanian footballer
- Vytautas Matulevičius (born 1952), Lithuanian journalist, political figure
- Blessed Jurgis Matulaitis-Matulevičius, Roman Catholic Bishop of Vilnius
- Ona Matulevičienė, a Lithuanian Righteous Among the Nations
- Margarita Matulevičiūtė, Lithianian hammer thrower
