= Saulius Bucevičius =

Lithuanian politician (born 1967)

Member of the Seimas
- Incumbent
- Assumed office 14 November 2024
- In office 15 November 2004 – 14 November 2016
- Constituency: Akmenės–Joniškio

Personal details
- Born: 10 October 1967 (age 58)
- Party: NA (since 2024)
- Other political affiliations: DP (2004–2016, 2019–2024); LS (2016–2019)

Saulius Bucevičius (born 10 October 1967) is a Lithuanian politician of the Dawn of Nemunas. He has been a member of the Seimas since 2024, having previously served from 2004 to 2016. He was a member of the Labour Party until 2016, when he switched to the Liberals' Movement.
