= Jonas Kondrotas =

Lithuanian politician (1943–2022)

Jonas Kondrotas (15 August 1943 – 28 January 2022) was a Lithuanian agronomist and politician, member of the 10th (2011–2012) and 11th (2012–2016) Seimas, member of the Labour Party.

Jonas Kondrotas was born in the village of Užgulbinė, Biržai district, Lithuania. In 1971 he graduated from the Lithuanian Academy of Agriculture.

He held the honorary title of Meritorious Lithuanian agronomist.
