= Lithuanian People's Party (2012) =

Lithuanian People's Party Lietuvos žmonių partija
- Leader: Joana Šimanauskienė
- Founded: February 12, 2012
- Headquarters: J. Gruodžio g. 9, Kaunas
- Membership: 1288 (2013)
- Ideology: Populism; Personalism
- Political position: Centre

The Lithuanian People's Party (Lithuanian: Lietuvos žmonių partija) was a minor political party in Lithuania with an unclear political orientation. It was established by the initiative of Russian-Lithuanian businessman Vladimir Romanov and only participated in the 2012 Lithuanian parliamentary election. After Romanov fled to Russia to avoid prosecution for a trial for bank fraud, the party ceased existing.

== History ==
Vladimir Romanov, owner of the majority of shares in the bank Ūkio bankas and majority shareholder of the Scottish Premier League football club Hearts and Lithuanian Basketball League club Žalgiris, announced his intention to establish a political party in February 2012. The party was described as centrist. Required signatures for the party's creation were collected from employees of Romanov's companies, who were pressured to participate.

The party was founded on 12 February 2012. The founding conference was opened by Romanov in a speech in which he spoke about his pseudohistorical views, including Lithuania's alleged past name "Basilica" and Sarmatia, and Lithuania's 5000 year old runic script, all which he claimed was erased from the historical record by "German historians and modern scientists". He was proposed as the party's chairman, but refused, instead putting forward disabled rights activist Joana Šimanauskienė, who was elected.

Three of Žalgiris's basketball players, Rimantas Kaukėnas, Kšyštof Lavrinovič and Darjuš Lavrinovič, ran for election on the party's list, as well as former players and others sports figures. Neither of the Lavrinovič brothers voted in the election.

The party performed the worst of all parties participating in the 2012 parliamentary election, receiving only 0.25 percent of the vote and no seats. Romanov later claimed that the party's intention was not to win, but "to show people how other parties deceive the population, destroy the state".

Ūkio bankas was suspended in February 2013. In August 2013, Lithuanian prosecutors announced an international search for Romanov on suspicion of embezzlement and misappropriation of high value assets. Romanov fled to Russia, where he was given asylum. The party ceased activity.

== Platform ==
According to the party's program, its goal is to preserve the national identity of the state, the nation and its citizens. The party claimed to oppose "divide-and-conquer strategies of global bureaucrats", and supported direct mayoral elections. It opposed the existing project for the Visaginas Nuclear Power Plant. According to Romanov, only Russia could construct a nuclear power plant in Lithuania.

== Election results ==
=== Seimas ===
Election	Votes (Note: Proportional representation votes.)	%	Seats	+/–	Government
2012	3,399	0.26 (#18)	0 / 141	0	Opposition
