= Vydas Gedvilas =

Lithuanian politician

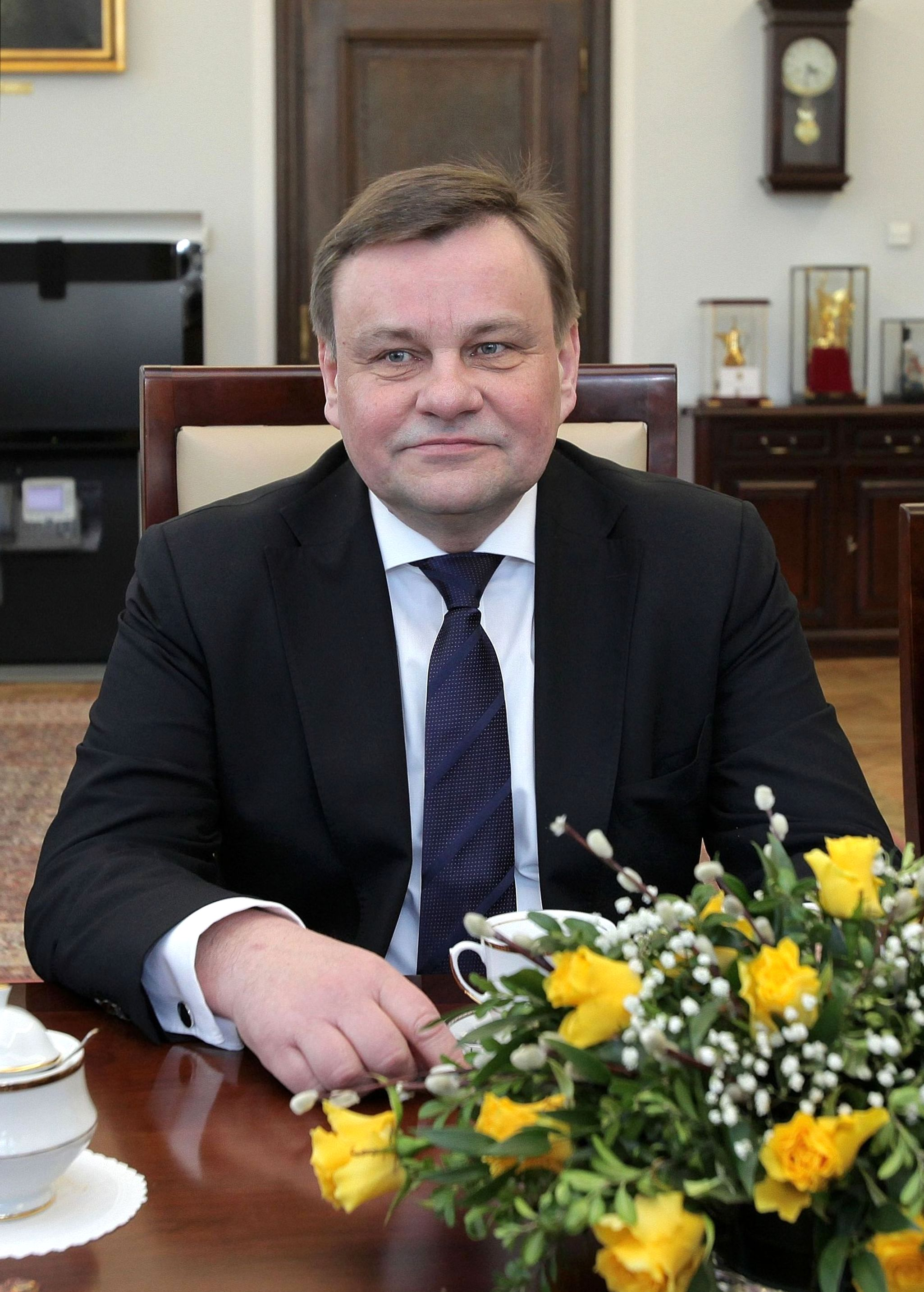
- Gedvilas in 2013

Speaker of the Seimas
- In office 16 November 2012 – 3 October 2013
- Preceded by: Irena Degutienė
- Succeeded by: Loreta Graužinienė

Personal details
- Born: 17 May 1959 (age 67) Užgiriai, Kelmė, Lithuanian Soviet Socialist Republic
- Party: Labour Party
- Education: Lithuanian Sports University

Vydas Gedvilas (born 17 May 1959) is a Lithuanian basketball coach and politician, former Speaker of the Seimas, member of the Labour Party.

Gedvilas graduated from the Lithuanian State Institute of Physical Education (now Lithuanian Sports University) in 1981 and started teaching in the institute. In 1999, he acquired a doctorate degree from the same institution.

Between 1988 and 1993, Gedvilas was the coach of the LSU-Atletas men's basketball team. In 1993, he started as the head coach of the women's team of the Lithuanian Academy of Physical Education, "Viktorija". He guided the team to Lithuanian and Baltic championship titles. Between 1996 and 2002, he worked as the head coach of the Lithuanian women's national basketball team, leading the team to its first European title.

In 2004, he was elected to the parliament of Lithuania, the Seimas under the electoral list of the Labour Party. He served as the acting Speaker of the Seimas in on 12 April 2006. He was elected to the Seimas again in 2008 and 2012. Between 16 November 2012 and 3 October 2013, Gevilas served as the Speaker of the Seimas.

In 2013, Gedvilas called for reintroducing capital punishment.

== See also ==
- List of EuroBasket Women winning head coaches

Political offices
Preceded by Irena Degutienė	Speaker of the Seimas; 2012–2013	Succeeded by Loreta Graužinienė
Preceded by Artūras Paulauskas	Speaker of the Seimas; Acting; 2006	Succeeded by Viktoras Muntianas
