= Irena Degutienė =

Lithuanian politician (born 1949)

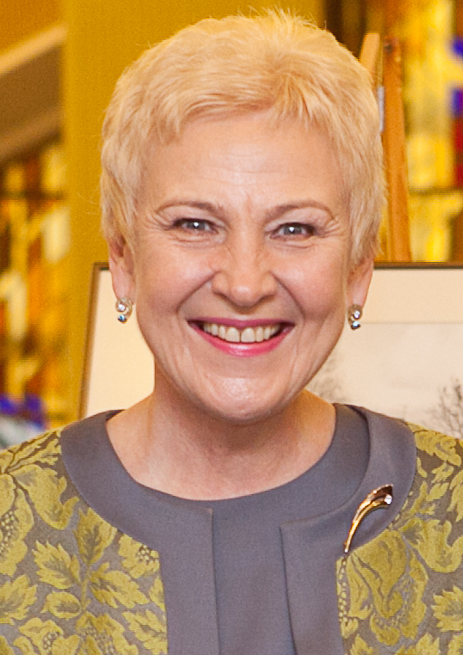
- Degutienė in 2012

Deputy Speaker of the Seimas
- In office 16 November 2012 – 13 November 2020

Speaker of the Seimas
- In office 17 September 2009 – 14 September 2012
- Preceded by: Arūnas Valinskas
- Succeeded by: Vydas Gedvilas

First Deputy Speaker of the Seimas
- In office 20 November 2008 – 16 September 2009
- Preceded by: Algis Čaplikas
- Succeeded by: Raimondas Šukys

Prime Minister of Lithuania Acting
- In office 27 October 1999 – 3 November 1999
- President: Valdas Adamkus
- Preceded by: Rolandas Paksas
- Succeeded by: Andrius Kubilius
- In office 4 May 1999 – 18 May 1999
- President: Valdas Adamkus
- Preceded by: Gediminas Vagnorius
- Succeeded by: Rolandas Paksas

Minister for Social Security and Labour
- In office 4 December 1996 – 27 October 2000
- Prime Minister: Gediminas Vagnorius
- Preceded by: Mindaugas Mikaila
- Succeeded by: Vilija Blinkevičiūtė

Member of Seimas
- In office 14 November 2016 – 13 November 2020
- Constituency: Multi-member
- In office 15 November 2004 – 14 November 2016
- Preceded by: Vytautas Kvietkauskas
- Succeeded by: Žygimantas Pavilionis
- Constituency: Naujamiestis
- In office 25 November 1996 – 14 November 2004
- Constituency: Multi-member

Personal details
- Born: 1 June 1949 (77 years old) Šiauliai, then part of Lithuanian SSR, Soviet Union
- Party: Homeland Union
- Spouse: Gediminas Degutis
- Education: Vilnius University

Irena Degutienė (born 1 June 1949) is a Lithuanian politician and member of the conservative Homeland Union. She is currently the Deputy Speaker of Seimas, and was twice the acting Prime Minister of Lithuania, first from 4 May 1999 to 18 May 1999 and then from 27 October 1999 to 3 November 1999. She has also been the Speaker of Seimas from 15 September 2009 to 14 September 2012, as well as Minister for Social Security and Labour from 1996 to 2000. In 1978, she graduated from Vilnius University with a degree in medicine. For almost twenty years, she worked in Vilnius Red Cross Hospital before becoming a secretary in the Ministry of Health in 1994. She was initially elected to Seimas in 1996. Degutienė is the first woman to be Speaker of Seimas in Lithuania's history.

== MG Baltic bribery scandal ==
In 2017, Eligijus Masiulis 250-thousand-euro bribery scandal sparked one of the largest corruption investigations in Lithuania's history. Secret surveillance by VSD revealed that MG Baltic, a Lithuanian conglomerate, has been exerting influence and systematically bribing prosecutors, politicians and government bureaucrats. Irena Degutienė is implicated in the corruption scandal – MG Baltic preferred and favoured her nomination as head of her political party.

== Honours ==
=== National honours ===
- Lithuania Grand Cross of the Order of Vytautas the Great (6 July 2019)

Seimas
Preceded by Vytautas Kvietkauskas	Member of the Seimas for Naujamiestis; 2004–2016	Succeeded by Žygimantas Pavilionis
Political offices
Preceded by Gediminas Vagnorius	Prime Minister of Lithuania; Acting; 1999	Succeeded by Rolandas Paksas
Preceded by Rolandas Paksas	Prime Minister of Lithuania; Acting; 1999	Succeeded by Andrius Kubilius
Preceded by Arūnas Valinskas	Speaker of the Seimas; 2009–2012	Succeeded by Vydas Gedvilas
