= Audrius Nakas =

Lithuanian politician and actor (born 1967)

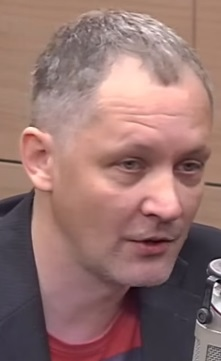

Member of the Seimas
- In office 14 April 2015 – 14 November 2016
- Preceded by: Algirdas Vaclovas Patackas
- Constituency: Multi–member

Personal details
- Born: 1967 (age 57–58); Kaunas, Lithuania
- Political party: The Way of Courage

Audrius Nakas (born 1967) is a Lithuanian politician and a former member of the Seimas. He graduated from the Lithuanian Academy of Music and Theatre and worked as an actor before a career in politics.

Nakas was sworn into the parliament on 14 April 2015, after MP Algirdas Vaclovas Patackas had died.
