= Naglis Puteikis =

Lithuanian politician (born 1964)

Naglis Puteikis MP
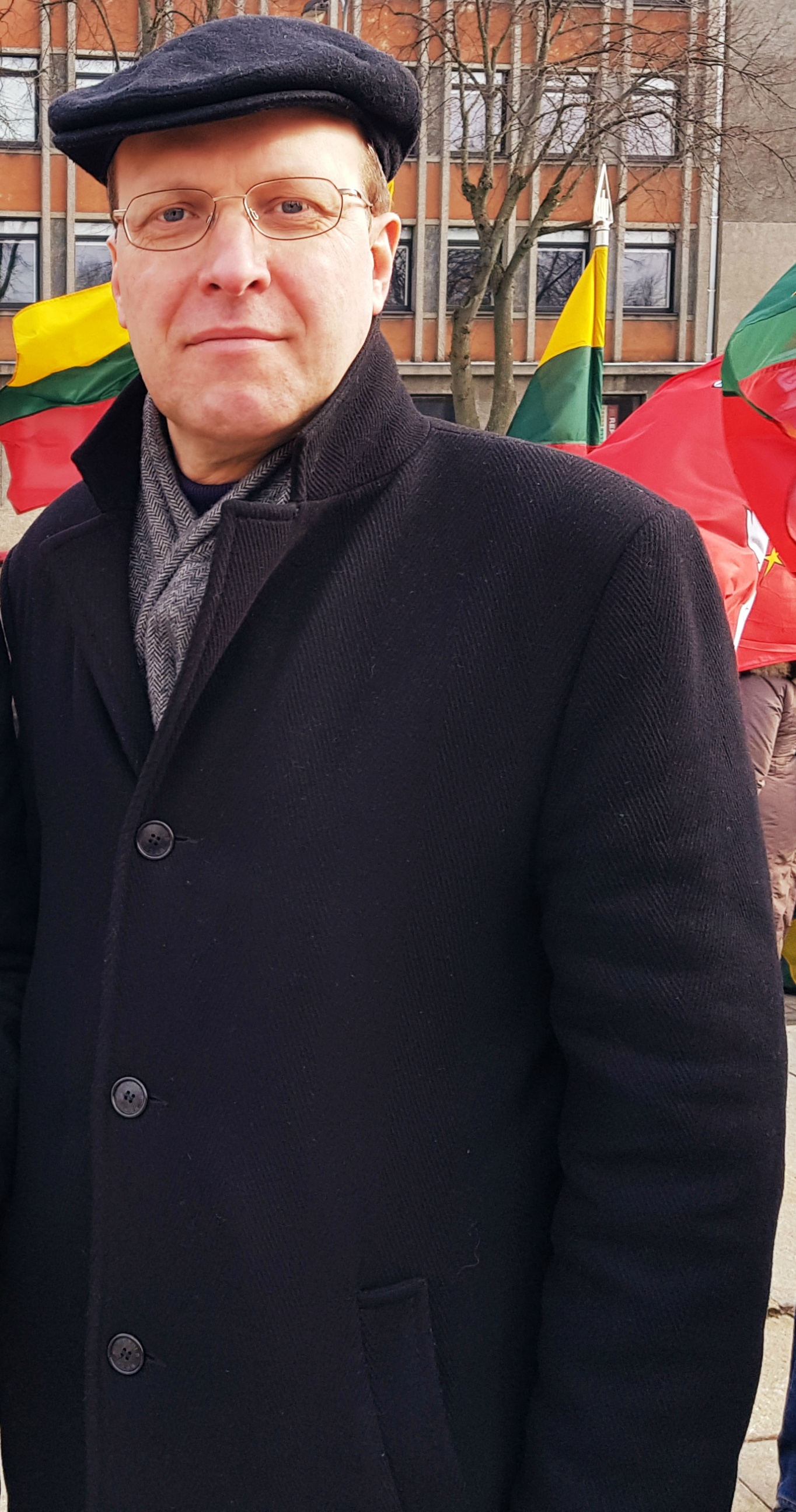

Member of Seimas for Danė constituency
- In office 14 November 2016 – 13 November 2020
- Preceded by: Post created
- Succeeded by: Arvydas Pocius

Chairman of the Lithuanian Centre Party
- In office 28 May 2016 – 29 September 2021
- Preceded by: Albinas Stankus
- Succeeded by: Petras Gražulis

Vice-chairman of the Audit Committee of the Seimas
- In office 17 November 2016 – 13 November 2020
- Preceded by: Post created

Personal details
- Born: 2 September 1964 (age 62) Vilnius, Lithuanian SSR, Soviet Union
- Party: Homeland Union (1996–2014); Independent (2014–2017); Centre Party (2017–present)
- Spouse: Nina Puteikienė
- Children: 2
- Education: Vilnius University
- Profession: Historian, Archaeologist, Museologist
- Website: www.puteikis.lt

Naglis Puteikis (born 2 September 1964) is a Lithuanian politician and member of the Seimas.

== Biography ==
Naglis Puteikis was born on 2 September 1964 in Vilnius. In 1984, he graduated from the Faculty of History at Vilnius University and worked with preservation of historical heritage. Puteikis headed the Inspectorate of Cultural Heritage and, later, the Department for Protection of Cultural Valuables.

Puteikis joined Homeland Union in 1996. In 1997, he briefly served on the Seventh Seimas, having been elected through the party's electoral list in 1996, but not initially taking his seat in the parliament. Between 1997 and 2001 he served on the Council of Klaipėda City Municipality. Puteikis again served on the parliament between 2011 and 2012. In the elections in 2012 he was elected to the Seimas in the single-seat constituency of Danė (19).

In 2014, Puteikis left the Homeland Union, criticizing the party on a number of policy issues, including its support for incumbent President Dalia Grybauskaitė in the elections in 2014. He challenged the President in the 2014 election, receiving 9.37% of the votes and coming in 4th. Puteikis joined Lithuanian Centre Party in 2016 and was appointed its chairman. He announced his intentions to participate in the elections to the Seimas later the same year together with TV producer and personality Kristupas Krivickas. Although their coalition failed to clear the 7% threshold for Seimas seats in the nationwide constituency, Puteikis was elected to the parliament in the single-member constituency of Danė (23) in Klaipėda.

In November 2018, Puteikis registered as a candidate for the 2019 Presidential Election.

Seimas
Preceded by Vytautas Grubliauskas	Member of the Seimas for Danė electoral district 2011–2020	Succeeded by Arvydas Pocius
