= Vytautas Matulevičius =

Lithuanian television presenter, journalist and politician

Member of the Seimas
- In office 2012–2016

Personal details
- Born: 31 July 1952 (age 73) Šilavotas, Prienai district, Lithuanian SSR, USSR
- Party: The Way of Courage (2012–16)
- Spouse: Svetlana Matulevičienė
- Children: 3

Vytautas Antanas Matulevičius (born 31 July 1952) is a Lithuanian journalist, publicist, political figure and a former member of the Seimas.

== Biography ==
In 1970, he finished Vilnius 22nd High School and in 1975 he graduated from Vilnius University Faculty of History where he gained the speciality of journalism. Later on, Matulevičius had postgraduate studies at the Department of Culture of the Academy of Social Sciences. In 1989, Matulevičius defended his dissertation called Contradictions in Public Life and Artistic Conflict (Lithuanian: Visuomenės gyvenimo prieštaravimai ir meninis konfliktas).

He was a correspondent and the secretary-in-chief of a newspaper The Truth of Communist Youth (Lithuanian: Komjaunimo tiesa). Later he went to Moscow and became the secretary-in-chief of a newspaper Press of the Youth (Russian: Molodiozhnaja pechat). He also worked on a journal Friendship (Russian: Druzhba). When Matulevičius returned to Lithuania in 1989, he became the correspondent of a newspaper Truth (Russian: Pravda). However, in 1990, after Lithuanian daily newspaper The Republic (Lithuanian: Respublika) publicly announced that Pravda advocates against the emancipation processes in Lithuania, Matulevičius left his position.

After Lithuania declared its independence from the USSR in 1990, he debuted with a show The Mirror (Lithuanian: Veidrodis). Following the Russian paratrooper's capture of Lithuanian television in 1991, Matulevičius participated in recreating television programs as a journalist and as editor-in-chief of public broadcasting. At the time, the building of Supreme Soviet of the Lithuanian SSR served as a residence where journalistic programs were broadcast. One of such was Shore (Lithuanian: Krantas). Between 1992 and 1997 the latter program was broadcast by Lithuanian television and then 1997 until 2001 by Baltijos TV. In 2002, a new program The Vytautas Matulevičius Show (Lithuanian: Vytauto Matulevičiaus laida) started on BTV channel.

Starting from 2002 to 2006 he was the director of the private enterprise Krantas. Between 2004 and 2005 he worked in Lietuvos rytas TV.

In 2020, he, along with journalists Rūta Janutienė and Valdas Vasiliauskas, created a Lithuanian alternative media channel OpTV (short for Oppositional Television) on YouTube aimed at providing "the freedom of speech, investigative journalism, opinions of experts and society, and debates about politics of Lithuania, the Baltic States, and the post-Soviet states at large". This union was formed after all three lost their jobs working for mainstream media channels. According to the description of the channel, their mission is to create channel that is "free from political and informal centres of power".

== Political career ==
From 2009 to 2012 Matulevičius worked as an assistant for the Lithuanian President Rolandas Paksas. In 2012, he joined the political party Way of Courage and was elected to the Seimas until 2016. He also supported a Lithuanian judge and a former member of Seimas Neringa Venckienė.

== Filmography ==
| Year | Film title in Lithuanian | Film title in English | Notes |
|---|---|---|---|
| 2006 | Visi prieš vieną | All Against One | film featuring Lithuanian President Rolandas Paksas |
| 2008 | Pilotas | The Pilot | screenwriter; narrative film by director Saulius Vosylius |
