= Viktoras Muntianas =

Lithuanian politician (born 1951)

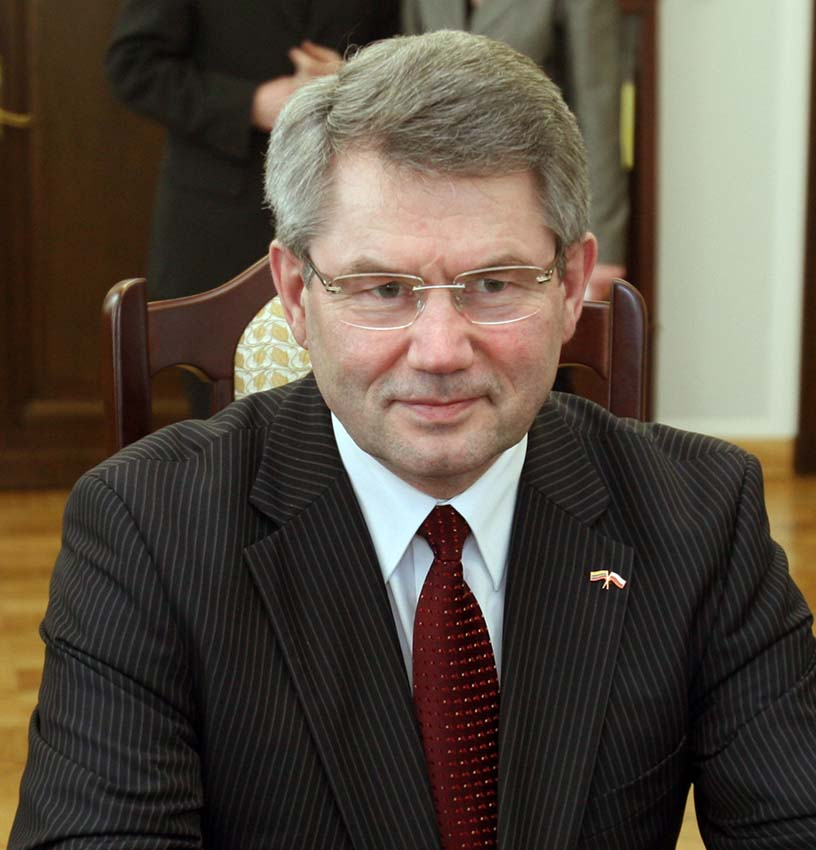
- Muntianas in 2007

Speaker of Seimas
- In office 13 April 2006 – 1 April 2008
- Preceded by: Vydas Gedvilas (acting)
- Succeeded by: Česlovas Juršėnas

Personal details
- Born: 11 November 1951 (age 73); Marijampolė, Lithuanian SSR
- Political party: Liberal Movement (2010s); Civic Democratic Party (2006–2010); Labour Party (2003-2006); New Union (Social Liberals) (1999-2003); Lithuanian Peasants Party (1995-1999); Independent (1989-1995); Communist Party of Lithuania (until 1989)

Viktoras Muntianas (born 11 November 1951) is a Lithuanian politician of Moldovan descent and former Speaker of the Seimas. In 1968 he graduated from the high school in Marijampolė. In 1973 he enrolled in the Vilnius Civil Engineering Institute, completing his studies in 1978. Between 1986 and 1990 he was first deputy of Kėdainiai municipality chairman. Later he started a career in business, becoming manager of Ūkio bankas filial in Kėdainiai in 1994. After two years he became vice-president of Vikonda concern.

Soon afterwards Muntianas renewed his political career. On 1997 he became mayor of Kėdainiai; in 2004 he was elected to the Seimas. Muntianas was Speaker of the Seimas from 2006 until resigning on 1 April 2008.

Political offices
| Preceded by Vydas Gedvilas; Acting | Speaker of the Seimas; 2006–2008 | Succeeded by Česlovas Juršėnas |
