= The Way of Courage =

The Way of Courage Drąsos kelias
- Leader: Neringa Venckienė
- Chairperson: Jonas Varkala
- Founded: March 19, 2012
- Dissolved: June 30, 2025
- Headquarters: Garliava, Vytauto g. 57-2
- Membership (Oct 2024): 2,070
- Ideology: Anti-pedophile activism Populism; Anti-corruption

Website
- http://www.drasoskeliaspartija.lt/

The Way of Courage (Lithuanian: Drąsos Kelias) was a one-issue populist political party in Lithuania. It was founded in 2012 and had an anti-corruption platform. It became inactive in the 2020s and was formally liquidated on 30 June 2025.

== History ==
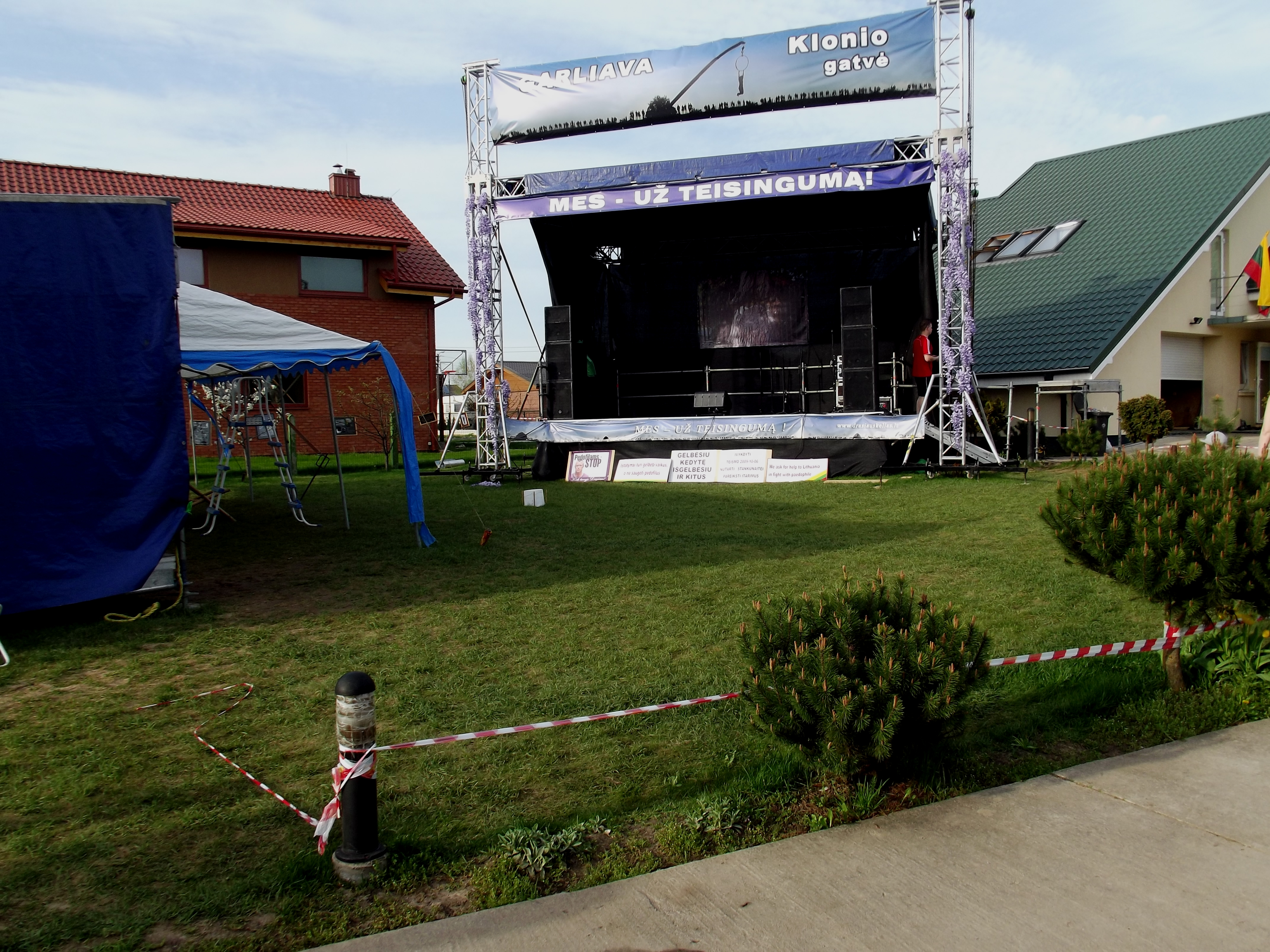
Anti-pedophile political advertisements of The Way of Courage in Garliava.

The party was established by supporters of Drąsius Kedys, who claimed that justice officials had whitewashed a ring of pedophiles after he had accused another person of sexually molesting his daughter. Kedys had died under unclear circumstances in 2010. Among the party's founders is Neringa Venckienė, a former judge and sister of Drąsius Kedys.

The party's name alludes to Kedys' first name Drąsius which means "the brave". The goals include changes in the justice system, e.g. the establishment of trial by jury. In the 2012 parliamentary election the party gained approximately 8% of the popular vote. The party had its best performance in Kaunas and Kaunas District Municipality.

After the party's leader Neringa Venckiene applied for asylum in the United States, many party members decided not to participate in the future elections because of the "exile" of their leader.

The party's chairman is Jonas Varkala, a former Catholic priest, who officially left the church in February 2012. He was a constant critic of the ethics of the leaders of the church, particularly in regards to sexual abuse of children.

With impeachment of Neringa Venckienė and Valdas Vasiliauskas moving to the Order and Justice parliamentary group on 2014, the party's parliamentary group was dissolved as it had less than 7 members.

In 2016, the party won just over 1 per cent of the votes and lost all representatives in parliament.

In 2024, Varkala confirmed that the party is no longer active and will be liquidated. It was later confirmed that the procedure had started in mid-2024.

== Member of Seimas (2012–2016) ==
- Neringa Venckiene (born 1971), (MP until 2014, Impeached), Judge
- Jonas Varkala (born 1951), Priest
- Aurelija Stancikienė (born 1966), Architect
- Algirdas Vaclovas Patackas (born 1943), (MP until 2015, Died), Signer of the Lithuanian Declaration of Independence
- Dr. Vytautas Antanas Matulevičius (born 1952), Journalist
- Prof. Povilas Gylys (born 1948), Economist
- Valdas Vasiliauskas (born 1951), Journalist
- Prof. dr. Gintaras Aleknonis (born 1961), (refused to be sworn in), Journalist.
- Prof. Stasys Brundza (born 1947), (MP from 2014), Economist
- Audrius Nakas (born 1967), (MP from 2015), Actor

== Political ideology ==
The party is generally considered populist. Some researchers have described it as "a single issue protest community". It included members from across the political spectrum. While some of its leaders, such as Jonas Varkala and Algirdas Patackas, were conservative, others were more liberal, such as Vytautas Matulevičius, who was one of the first Lithuanian politicians to support same-sex partnerships.

In its 2012 electoral program, the party promised various populist measures such as higher pensions, simplified referendum law and abolishing Lithuania's parallel voting system in favor of first-past-the-post. It also vowed to combat corruption, establish progressive taxation and ban advertisement of alcohol.

== Election results ==
=== Seimas ===
Election	Votes (Note: Proportional representation votes.)	%	Seats	+/–	Government
2012	109,448	8.34 (#5)	7 / 141	▲7	External support
2016	3,498	0.29 (#14)	0 / 141	▼7	—
2020	13,337	1.18 (#13)	0 / 141	0	—
2024	Did not compete		0 / 141	0	—

=== Municipal ===
Election	Votes (Note: Municipal council election votes.)	%	Council seats	Mayors	+/–
2015	1,243	0.11 (#18)	0 / 1,473	0 / 60	New entry
2019	Did not compete		0 / 1,442	0 / 60	0
