= Valentinas Mazuronis =

Lithuanian politician

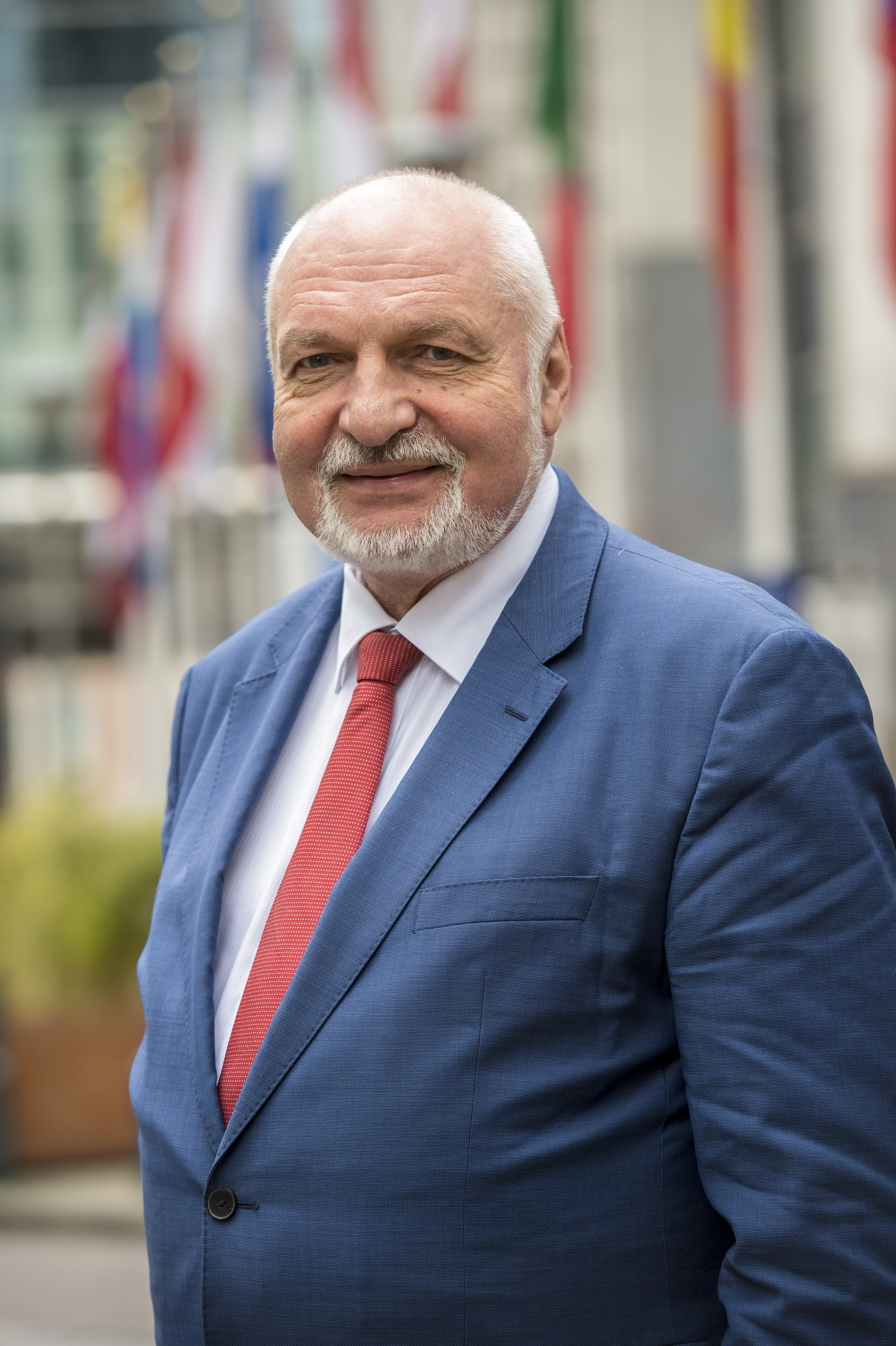

Minister of Environment
- In office 13 December 2012 – 26 June 2014
- Prime Minister: Algirdas Butkevičius
- Preceded by: Algis Kašėta
- Succeeded by: Kęstutis Trečiokas

Member of the European Parliament for Lithuania
- In office 2014–2019

Personal details
- Born: 18 November 1953 (age 72) Molėtai, Lithuanian SSR, USSR (now Lithuania)
- Party: Lithuanian Liberal Union (1991–2001); Order and Justice (2001–2015); Labour Party (2015–2016)

Valentinas Mazuronis (born 18 November 1953) is a Lithuanian politician and a member of the European Parliament.

== Background ==
Valentinas Mazuronis was born in Molėtai. After graduating from high school in Utena in 1971, he studied in Lithuanian state institute of arts (now Vilnius Academy of Arts), attaining a degree in architecture in 1976.

After the independence, Mazuronis worked as an architect between 1991 and 2004 under sole proprietorship "Valentino Mazuronio projektavimo biuras".

== Political career ==
Between 1991 and 2002 Mazuronis was a member of Šiauliai city council. Until 2001, he was the member of the Lithuanian Liberal Union. Upon the split in the party in 2001, Mazuronis joined the Liberal Democratic Party, becoming its chairman in 2002. In 2004, he was elected to the Seimas under the electoral list of the coalition "for the order and justice", headed by Rolandas Paksas. Mazuronis led the Liberal Democratic parliamentary group. He was elected to the Seimas again in 2004 and was the leader of the opposition.

In 2012, Mazuronis was elected to the Seimas for a third term, under the electoral list of Order and Justice party (formerly Liberal Democratic Party). In December 2012 he was appointed the Minister of Environment.

In 2014 Mazuronis was elected as a member of the European Parliament, resigning from his position in the cabinet. In April 2015, Mazuronis left the Order and Justice and joined the ranks of Labour Party. He was appointed the chairman of the party in May 2015, but resigned after the disappointing performance by the party in the first round of Seimas elections in 2016.
