= Neringa Venckienė =

Lithuanian politician

Member of the 11th Seimas of Lithuania
- In office 16 November 2012 – 19 June 2014 (Impeached)
- Prime Minister: Algirdas Butkevicius
- Succeeded by: Gintaras Aleknonis (refused to be sworn in)
- Succeeded by: Stasys Brundza

Personal details
- Born: 21 May 1971 (age 55) Kaunas, Lithuanian SSR, Soviet Union
- Party: Way of Courage
- Spouse: Aidas Venckus (until 2014)
- Education: Vilnius University
- Profession: Judge

Neringa Venckienė (born 21 May 1971 in Kaunas) is a former Lithuanian judge and member of the Seimas of Lithuania.

In 2008–2009, Venckienė's brother Drąsius Kedys accused three men of sexually molesting his four-year-old daughter. One of the men and the girl's aunt were murdered in October 2009. Kedys became the prime suspect but he was found dead in June 2010. The girl's custody was initially awarded to Venckienė. The courts later awarded the custody to the girl's mother. These court ruling caused a popular uproar in Lithuania and members of the public started a vigil guarding the house where the girl lived so that the police could not take her away. Armed riot police forcibly took away the girl on 17 May 2012. Few days later, charges were brought against Venckienė who resigned from her job as a judge. She became leader of the new The Way of Courage political party and was elected to the Seimas in the October 2012 elections. In April 2013, the Seimas voted to remove Venckienė's legal immunity and she fled to the United States seeking political asylum. In June 2014, Venckienė was impeached and her mandate was removed. In November 2019, she was extradited back to Lithuania, where she was released on bail and is tried for relative minor offenses. She was found guilty in 2021 and sentenced to 21 months in prison but released due to time already served.

== Early life and education ==
Venckienė was born as Neringa Kedytė in Kaunas, Lithuanian Soviet Socialist Republic in 1971.

In 1989, she graduated from Garliava 1st High School with high honors. From 1989 to 1995, she studied at the Law Faculty of Vilnius University. From 2005, she studied for her doctorate at Mykolas Romeris University.

From 1995 to 1999, Venckienė worked as a jurist at the Lithuanian University of Agriculture (now Aleksandras Stulginskis University). Between 1999 and 2007 she worked as a Kaunas District Court judge and served as an appeal judge at Kaunas Regional Court from 2007 to 2012.

== Pedophilia case ==
=== Pedophilia and murders ===
Venckienė's brother Drąsius Kedys (b. 1972), and his former girlfriend, Laimutė Stankūnaitė (b. 1986) had an out-of-wedlock daughter in February 2004. The couple split up in 2006. His former girlfriend originally obtained the custody of the girl. But later gave custody to the father, stating that she could not afford to take care of the child.

On 29 November 2008, Kedys submitted a formal complaint to the police, claiming that Andrius Ūsas, an advisor to the speaker of the Parliament, paid Stankūnaitė to sexually molest his daughter. In February 2009, Kedys further pressed accusations against Violeta Naruševičienė, a sister of Stankūnaitė, claiming the former had allowed men to molest his 4-year-old daughter. In July 2009, Kedys also accused Jonas Furmanavičius, a district judge, and an unidentified individual known only as Aidas, of partaking in the molestation. All of those people (except for the unidentified Aidas) professed their innocence, and in turn accused Kedys of slander, criminal libel, and death threats.

On 5 October 2009, Furmanavičius and Naruševičienė were shot dead in Kaunas. Kedys became the prime suspect. The story caused an uproar in Lithuania, much of the public siding with Kedys: in the public mind, the case was seen as largely a father's futile attempts in pursuing justice and trying to protect his daughter, and by being driven to desperate measures by anger at the injustice. After six months of police search, Drąsius Kedys' body was found near Kaunas Reservoir on 20 April 2010. According to the official report, the cause of death was "choking on his own vomit" whilst being heavily intoxicated. However, his relatives were convinced that Kedys had been murdered, pointing to some wounds on his body, and the fact that there was no vomit found on the scene. Ūsas, the main suspect in the pedophilia case, was officially charged with sexual molestation of a minor. However, he was found dead in June 2010. According to the police, he fell off his all-terrain vehicle and drowned in 8 inches of water. The death was ruled an accident. The court case against Ūsas continued. The court found him innocent in November 2012.

=== Custody fight ===
The custody of the girl was initially given to Kedys' sister Venckienė. In May 2010, the court gave custody of the girl to the biological mother Stankūnaitė. Outraged by this decision, according to different sources, up to 2000 people surrounded Venckienė's home and would not let the police pass. After the continued protests and demonstrations, the court reversed its decision to transfer the custody of the girl to the mother. But in 2011, the custody was once again awarded to the biological mother. The vigil outside Venckienė's house started again.

On 23 March 2012, police surrounded the house and attempted to take the girl by force. The girl refused to go. The failed attempt was broadcast on national TV. People were outraged at the footage of the mother and her bodyguard attempting to pull the screaming girl away from the grandmother. This attempt was stopped by child protective services, stating that it was traumatizing the child. After 23 March the girl developed PTSD.

At 6 am on 17 May 2012, 240 police officers went to Venckienė's home. The police shut down the roads, closed the local school, and enforced a lockdown of a 2-mile (3-km) perimeter around Venckienė's house. The protesters were pulled aside, 39 of them arrested. Police used rubber sticks, electric shock, police dogs, tear gas and rubber bullets. After a failed attempt to get in the house through the main entrance, the police broke the side glass door. Police turned off the security cameras inside the home. The girl was carried away screaming.

After the girl was transferred, the footage of the police operation went viral. Around 200 people spontaneously showed up to protest at the Presidential Palace in Vilnius. Smaller protests occurred in other Lithuanian cities as well. President Dalia Grybauskaite addressed the nation, requesting an investigation into whether force was used against the girl. On 19 May, according to various sources, 1000–5000 Venckienė's supporters protested at the Presidential Palace in Vilnius. On the same day, the President attended a NATO Summit in Chicago. A few hundred Lithuanian-Americans surrounded Grybauskaite's car and would not let her pass. On 26 May, a few thousand Venckienė's supporters marched from the Seimas building to the Presidential Palace.

== Seimas, impeachment and extradition ==
In March 2011, Venskienė was reprimanded by the Judicial Discipline and Ethics Commission because "Venckienė in her actions and statements in the public media violated Judges etiquette code of conduct regarding respecting a person, loyalty to the country, unbiasedness, selflessness, respect and example principles".

On 23 May 2012, few days after the police forcibly removed her niece from the house in Garliava, six charges were brought against Venckienė, including not following a court order, assault, disrespecting the court. According to the Constitution of Lithuania, judges cannot be arrested or tried without the approval by the parliament. In June 2012, Venckienė resigned her judgeship after the parliament voted to remove her legal immunity.

Venckienė became the face of the new The Way of Courage political party. The goals include changes in the justice system, the establishment of trial by jury, and stricter punishments for corruption, rape and pedophilia. According to "Vilmorus" polls, Venckienė became one of the top ten politicians in the country. Media speculated about her run for the presidency in 2014, challenging Dalia Grybauskaitė. In October 2012, Venckienė and six of her supporters were elected to the Parliament of Lithuania. She was selected as the chairwoman of The Way of Courage faction.

The parliament approved the prosecutors' request to remove Venckienė's legal immunity on 9 April 2013. She fled to the United States on the day of the removal of her immunity. In June 2014, Venckienė was impeached and her mandate removed. She was the first person to be impeached without being present or legally informed about the proceedings. Gintaras Aleknonis, who was supposed to take Venckienė's place in parliament, refused to be sworn in.

In 2015, the Lithuanian authorities requested the extradition of Venckienė back to Lithuania. At the time she faced 39 criminal charges, including illegal surveillance, disrespecting the national anthem, and public statements to infringe on sovereignty of Lithuania. Additional charges were brought against Venckienė, including an attempt to overthrow the government, spying, and a threat to the state. These charges were later dropped.

In February 2018, Venckienė was arrested in Chicago and detained in Chicago's federal prison. On 18 April 2018, Venckienė, giving an interview to Associated Press stated that "they have no reason to have me back but to kill me". American Judge Virginia Kendall refused to block Venckienė's extradition. She was extradited to Lithuania in November 2019.

In Lithuania, she was released on a 10,000 euro bail and faces trial for relatively minor offences of hitting a person, refusing to obey a court order, and resisting a police officer. In July 2021, Venckienė was found guilty on all charges and was sentenced to one year and nine months in prison. However, she was released as time already served under arrest exceeded the sentence. She was also ordered to pay 6,800 euros to the Lithuanian government for the extradition expenses as well as 6,300 euros to Stankūnaitė and 3,500 euros to two other individuals. Venckienė lost her case in the appeals court in January 2022 and appealed further to the Supreme Court of Lithuania in May 2022.

== International reaction ==
On 25 June 2018, U.S. Congressman Chris Smith from New Jersey introduced a private bill in the House of Representatives "for the relief of Judge Neringa Venckienė, who the Government of Lithuania seeks on charges related to her pursuit of justice against Lithuanian public officials accused of sexually molesting her young niece". On 27 June, Congressman Randy Hultgren introduced an identical bill. Both bills are similarly short titled: "Give Judge Venckienė Her Day In Court Act".

On 27 September, the Commission on Security and Cooperation in Europe, also known as the U.S. Helsinki Commission held a hearing titled: "Politically Motivated (In)Justice – The Extradition Case of Judge Venckienė". The commission is independent U.S. government agency which was created 1975 to monitor Human Rights Violations and to encourage compliance with the Helsinki Final Act. The Government of Lithuania decided not to participate in the hearing.

On 2 February 2019, Rep. Smith re-introduced the "Give Judge Venckienė Her Day In Court Act" in the 116th Congress of the United States. In May 2020, after a classified video of the 2012 police operation surfaced – showing violence being used by police officers and Stankunaitė against the girl and Venckienė, Rep. Smith released a statement condemning Lithuania's actions and "[calling] on the Lithuanian government to cease the prosecution of Judge Venckienė".

== Publications ==
- Drasius' Hope To Save The Girl (Drąsiaus viltis – išgelbėti mergaitę) (2011), 328 pages.
- The Way of Courage (Drąsos keliu) (2012), 128 pages.
