= Algirdas Vaclovas Patackas =

Lithuanian politician

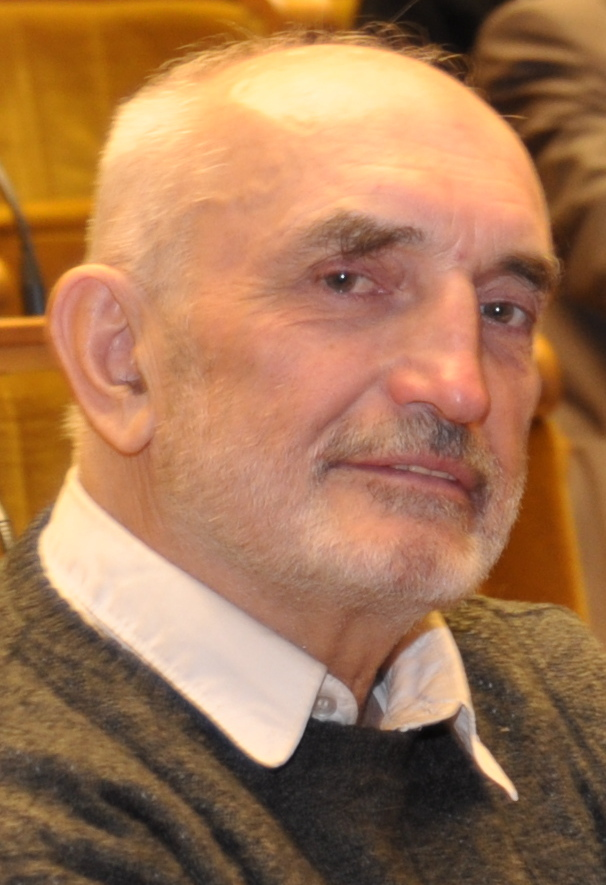
Algirdas Patackas

Algirdas Vaclovas Patackas (28 September 1943 — 3 April 2015) was a Lithuanian politician, dissident, poet, writer. In 1990 he was among those who signed the Act of the Re-Establishment of the State of Lithuania.

Patackas died on 3 April 2015. Audrius Nakas took his seat in the parliament.

Seimas
New constituency	Member of the Seimas for Žaliakalnis; 1990–1996	Succeeded by Joana Danguolė Sadeikienė
