= Eligijus Masiulis =

Lithuanian politician (born 1974)

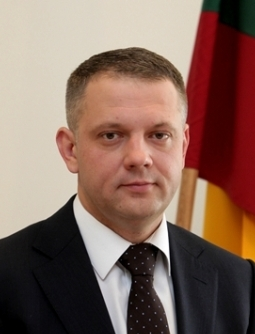

Member of the Seimas for Marios constituency
- In office 17 November 2008 – 24 May 2016
- Preceded by: Vaclav Stankevič
- Succeeded by: Naglis Puteikis

Minister of Transport and Communications of Lithuania
- In office 9 December 2008 – 13 December 2012
- President: Dalia Grybauskaitė
- Prime Minister: Andrius Kubilius
- Preceded by: Algirdas Butkevičius
- Succeeded by: Rimantas Sinkevičius

Member of the Seimas
- In office 19 October 2000 – 17 November 2008

Personal details
- Born: 15 October 1974 (age 51) Klaipėda, Lithuanian SSR, Soviet Union
- Citizenship: Lithuanian
- Party: Liberal Movement (2006-2016)
- Other political affiliations: Liberal Union of Lithuania (1996-2003); Liberal and Centre Union of Lithuania (2003-2006)
- Domestic partner: Ieva
- Children: Vilius and Elzė
- Education: Klaipėda University (B.Sc. in political science)

Eligijus Masiulis (born 15 October 1974) is a former Lithuanian politician. He has represented Liberal Movement party from 2008 to 2016. From 2008 to 2012 he was Minister of Transport and Communications of Lithuania.

In May 2016 Liberal Movement leader Masiulis stepped down after €106,000 bribe allegations from MG Baltic, one of the largest business groups in the Baltic countries. Antanas Guoga, was made the temporary leader of the Liberal Movement following the potential bribery scandal that prompted Eligijus Masiulis to step down. Masiulis may not have been the only person involved in potentially corrupt activities. After 2 years of investigation, the case charging Masiulis and MG Baltic has reached the court. National Security and Defence Committee of Seimas is currently investigating businesses influence on Lithuanian politics.

On 23 November 2023 he was convicted by the appeals court for bribery, influence peddling and illegal enrichment. He was sentenced to 5 years and 6 months in prison.
