= Labour Party (Lithuania) =

Lithuanian political party

Labour Party Darbo partija
- Abbreviation: DP
- Chairperson: Rolandas Janickas
- Vice Chairpeople: Alvydas Meištas; Raimundas Markauskas; Vaida Pocė; Aidas Gedvilas; Vigilijus Jukna; Vaida Giraitytė-Juškevičienė; Alicija Ščerbaitė; Rolandas Janickas; Antanas Makarevičius; Valentinas Bukauskas; Marijus Velička; Vaidas Kuzmarskis; Ieva Kačinskaitė-Urbonienė; Viktoras Fiodorovas
- Executive Secretary: Ingrida Karpuškaitė
- Founder: Viktor Uspaskich
- Founded: 18 October 2003
- Registered: 25 November 2003
- Headquarters: Ankštoji g. 3, Vilnius
- Membership (2023): 9357
- Ideology: Populism
- Political position: Centre-left
- European affiliation: EDP (2004–2012); ALDE Party (2012–2021)
- European Parliament group: ALDE Group (2004–2019); Renew Europe (2019–2021); Non-Inscrits (2021–2024)
- Colours: Blue; White
- Seimas: 0 / 141
- European Parliament: 0 / 11
- Municipal councils: 46 / 1,473
- Mayors: 0 / 60

Website
- www.darbopartija.lt

The Labour Party (Lithuanian: Darbo partija, DP) is a populist centre-left political party in Lithuania. The party was founded in 2003 by the Russian-born millionaire businessman and member of Seimas Viktor Uspaskich.

== History ==
=== Foundation and first government (2003–2006) ===
In its first electoral test, the 2004 European parliamentary elections, it was by far the most successful party, gaining 30.2% of the vote and returning five MEPs. It joined the European Democratic Party and thus the Alliance of Liberals and Democrats for Europe (ALDE) Group. At the legislative elections of 2004, the party won 28.4% of the popular vote and 39 out of 141 seats, making it the largest single party in the Parliament of Lithuania. After the election, Labour formed a coalition government with the Social Democratic Party of Lithuania, New Union and Lithuanian Peasant Popular Union.

After the 2004 Lithuanian parliamentary election, sociologist Vladas Gaidys speculated that the Labour Party supporters had previously voted for New Union (Social Liberals) between 2000 and 2004.

=== The "dark accounting" case ===
On 17 May 2006, a pre-trial investigation of the Labour Party began after information from the State Security Department of Lithuania revealed that the party may be funded from illegal activities. During the period from its foundation to 2006, the party's bookkeeping did not report 7 million Euros of additional income. Allegations were first raised on the party's accounting and secretaries, but on 29 June, it was declared that the party will be tried as a juridical person.

Uspaskich resigned from party leadership and fled to Moscow. After a European Arrest Warrant was given to arrest him, he was arrested on 15 August and extradited to Lithuania on 27 August. While in Moscow, Uspaskich organized press conferences where he declared Lithuania to be a "undemocratic state", and described the case as a politicized attempt to destroy the Labour Party.

The Labour Party was acquitted on 2013, as it united with the Labourist Party, a satellite party established in 2008, and was no longer the same legal entity. Though the Supreme Court of Lithuania made a ruling that this reorganization should have been ignored and the case should have been continued, it was not renewed due to an expired statute of limitations. Individual party leaders received fines and prison terms - however, they were acquitted in 2016, on the leadup to the 2016 parliamentary election.

=== Opposition (2006–2012) ===
Because of the ongoing "dark accounting" case, the party was expelled from the ruling coalition and moved to opposition in June 2006, while some of its members (including Speaker of the Seimas Viktoras Muntianas) founded the Civic Democratic Party and joined the new coalition led by Gediminas Kirkilas. At the legislative elections of 2008 the party lost heavily, retaining only 10 seats in the Seimas from its previous 39 and obtaining 9% of the national vote.

In 2011, the New Union (Social Liberals) merged with the party. In May 2012, the Labour Party joined the Alliance of Liberals and Democrats for Europe (ALDE) party.

=== Second government and opposition (since 2012) ===
At the 2012 parliamentary election the party had considerable success, obtaining 19.82% of the votes (+11.83% compared with the 2008 election) in the proportional representation quota and a total tally of 29 seats. Following the results, the Labour Party joined the coalition cabinet led by Algirdas Butkevičius, with four portfolio ministers out of 15. In 2013, the Christian Party merged with the party.

At the 2016 parliamentary election, the party obtained just 4.88% of the votes in the proportional representation quota (5% of the votes are needed for representation) and won only two seats in single member constituencies. In 2017 the party started to lose its members (including long–time members like former chairman Živilė Pinskuvienė) en masse, which formed various movements in local government or joined the Social Democratic Labour Party of Lithuania in 2018.

On 15 April 2018, former chairman Viktor Uspaskich was selected as the new chairman of the party. After this, the party made speedy recovery – in the 2019 municipal election, the party obtained 5.09% of the votes and in 2019 European Parliament election it won nearly 9% of the votes. At the 2020 parliamentary election, the Labour Party won about 10% of the votes. This gain of support was attributed to votes' shedding of Electoral Action of Poles in Lithuania – Christian Families Alliance, which by itself failed to reach 5% threshold in nationwide constituency.

In 2021, the party's board decided to withdraw from its affiliation of the Alliance of Liberals and Democrats for Europe Party. This came following the expulsion of party leader MEP Viktor Uspaskich from the Renew Europe group at the European Parliament due to his homophobic comments.

== Ideology ==
In the 2010s, the Labour Party was considered to be one of the main left-wing parties in Lithuania, together with the Social Democratic Party of Lithuania. However, it is also considered a personalistic populist party with an unclear ideological orientation. It describes itself as a "party of the centre open to everyone." The party owes its success and existence to the wealth and charisma of millionaire Russian-born businessman Viktor Uspaskich, who promoted a populist platform of opposing the elite and taking care of "the common man". The Centre for Eastern Studies and Center for Strategic and International Studies place the party left of center. The party is opposed to austerity policies and is known for its ambitious plans of social support. Its populism revolves around mobilizing dissatisfaction with established politicians for neglecting the poor social groups of Lithuania. The party's rhetoric has been described as "basically social democratic". At the same time, the party is also connected with major businesses in Lithuania, and it has been described as the political arm of the Lithuanian Confederation of Business Employers (Lithuanian: Lietuvos verslo darbdavių konfederacija), which Uspaskich was the president of from 1997 to 2003 and which was the origin of several of the party's founding members, including Romualda Kšanienė, Dangutė Mikutienė, Vitalija Vonžutaitė, Viktoras Muntianas, Šarūnas Birutis and Antanas Bosas.

During electoral campaigns, it generally advertises itself by promising raw increases to pensions and minimum wages, often beyond the country's ability to accomplish such promises; in the electoral campaign for the 2016 parliamentary elections, the Labour Party manifesto called to double minimum wages immediately after election, setting them at 60 percent of the average wage, a balance higher than in any European country. During the European migrant crisis, the Labour Party embraced anti-migrant rhetoric. The party's leader Valentinas Mazuronis called for Lithuania to block the distribution of refugees among EU member states. The party focuses on protecting and improving workers' rights in Lithuania, but also supports improving business conditions and boosting private investment, especially in the country's rural regions.

According to studies, the Labour Party garners support from voters with a positive judgment of the Soviet period and voters who see Russia as a potential partner to Lithuania rather than a threat, as well as non-Lithuanian voters. The party is commonly described as pro-Russian, though it has resented such claims, and officially supports membership in EU and NATO. The party's founder, Viktor Uspaskich, has led the party directly or indirectly ever since its foundation in 2003. According to Member of the Seimas and former Labour Party member Antanas Guoga, it is a "cult with a spiritual leader". Professor of the Institute of International Relations and Political Science in Vilnius University Tomas Janeliūnas described the party as "a collection of conformists", unified by Uspaskich. These descriptions came in the aftermath of a scandal in December 2020, in which Viktor Uspaskich used his Facebook account to advertise "ŪPAS" mineral water, which, according to him, provides a person with immunity against COVID-19, without the need of vaccination. Guoga was the only Labour Party MP to condemn the action, and it was either defended or unaddressed by other members of the party.

== Election results ==
=== Seimas ===
Election	Leader	Votes (Note: Proportional representation votes.)	%	Seats	+/–	Government
2004	Viktor Uspaskich	340,035	28.44 (#1)	39 / 141	New	Coalition (2004−2006)
2004	Viktor Uspaskich	340,035	28.44 (#1)	39 / 141	New	Opposition (2006−2008)
2008 (Note: Run in a joint list with Youth.)	Viktor Uspaskich	111,149	8.99 (#5)	10 / 141	▼29	Opposition
2012	Viktor Uspaskich	271,520	20.69 (#1)	29 / 141	▲19	Coalition
2016	Viktor Uspaskich	59,620	4.88 (#8)	2 / 141	▼27	Coalition (2016–2018)
2016	Viktor Uspaskich	59,620	4.88 (#8)	2 / 141	▼27	Opposition (2018)
2016	Viktor Uspaskich	59,620	4.88 (#8)	2 / 141	▼27	Coalition (2018–2019)
2020	Viktor Uspaskich	110,780	9.77 (#3)	10 / 141	▲8	Opposition
2024 (Note: Run as part of the Coalition of Peace (DP, LKDP and ŽP).)	Viktor Uspaskich	27,298	2.24 (#11)	0 / 141	▼10	Extra-parliamentary

=== European Parliament ===
Election	List leader	Votes	%	Seats	+/–	EP Group
2004	Ona Juknevičienė	363,931	30.16 (#1)	5 / 13	New	ALDE
2009	Viktor Uspaskich	48,368	8.79 (#4)	1 / 12	▼4	ALDE
2014	Viktor Uspaskich	146,607	12.81 (#5)	1 / 11	0	ALDE
2019	Viktor Uspaskich	112,964	8.99 (#4)	1 / 11	0	RE (until 2021)
2019	Viktor Uspaskich	112,964	8.99 (#4)	1 / 11	0	NI (from 2021)
2024	Valentinas Bukauskas	11,232	1.66 (#13)	0 / 11	▼1	–
