= 2012 Lithuanian parliamentary election =

- 14 October 2012 (first round); 28 October 2012 (second round)
- All 141 seats in the Seimas; 71 seats needed for a majority
- Turnout: 52.93% (▲4.34 pp)
Party	Leader	Vote %	Seats	+/–
DP	Viktor Uspaskich	20.69	29	+19
LSDP	Algirdas Butkevičius	19.18	38	+13
TS–LKD	Andrius Kubilius	15.75	33	−12
LS	Eligijus Masiulis	8.95	10	−1
DK	Neringa Venckiene	8.34	7	New
TT	Rolandas Paksas	7.63	11	−4
LLRA	Valdemar Tomaševski	6.08	8	+5
LVŽS	Ramūnas Karbauskis	4.05	1	−2
Independents	–	–	3	−1
This lists parties that won seats. See the complete results below.
Prime Minister before	Prime Minister after
Andrius Kubilius; TS–LKD	Algirdas Butkevičius; LSDP

Parliamentary elections were held in Lithuania on 14 October 2012, with a second round on 28 October in the constituencies where no candidate won a majority in the first round of voting. All 141 seats in the Seimas were up for election; 71 in single-seat constituencies elected by majority vote and the remaining 70 in a nationwide constituency based on proportional representation. Together with the elections, a referendum on the construction of a new nuclear power plant was held.

The Homeland Union, which had led the outgoing government, suffered as a result of its deeply unpopular austerity policies. The Lithuanian Social Democratic Party became the largest party in the Seimas after the elections, initially winning 38 seats (increasing to 39 after two by-elections). The Social Democratic Party and other left-wing parties had campaigned on the promise of ending the austerity, increasing the minimum wage, reducing unemployment and boosting public spending.

The Social Democratic Party formed a coalition with the Labour Party, Order and Justice and the Electoral Action of Poles in Lithuania. The resulting government was led by Algirdas Butkevičius.

== Background ==
The 2008 parliamentary elections were held on 12 October 2008, with the run-off on 26 October. The elections were won by the Homeland Union, which took 45 seats in the 141-member Tenth Seimas. The Homeland Union led a coalition in the parliament with the Liberal Movement, the Liberal and Centre Union and the National Resurrection Party. The populist National Resurrection Party splintered in 2010, with part of its representatives forming the Christian Party, while the remaining were absorbed by the Liberal and Centre Union in 2011. Social Democratic Party of Lithuania was the largest opposition party.

The leader of the Homeland Union, Andrius Kubilius, was appointed the Prime Minister heading a coalition government. Early in the term, the economy of Lithuania headed into severe recession, putting a strain on public finances which the government attempted to control by introducing broad austerity measures, including cuts to public spending and higher taxes. Despite the unpopularity of the measures and the resulting public protests, the coalition government became the first government in the history of Lithuania to serve the full term of the parliament.

== Electoral system ==
All seats in the 141-member Seimas were up for election in parallel voting, with 71 members elected in single-seat constituencies and 70 members elected by proportional representation in a single nationwide constituency. Voting in the elections was open to all citizens of Lithuania who are at least 18-years-old.

The first round took place on 9 October 2012. Members of the Seimas in the 71 single-seat constituencies were elected by a majority vote, with a run-off held on 28 October. The remaining 70 seats were allocated to the participating political parties using the largest remainder method, with a 5% threshold to enter the parliament. Candidates took the seats allocated to their parties based on the preference lists submitted before the elections and adjusted by preference votes given by the voters.

To be eligible for election, candidates had to be at least 25-years-old on the election day, not under allegiance to a foreign state and permanently resident in Lithuania. Persons serving or due to serve a sentence imposed by the court 65 days before the elections are not eligible. Also, judges, citizens performing military service, and servicemen of professional military service and officials of statutory institutions and establishments may not stand for election.

In addition, a person who has been removed from office through impeachment may not be elected. This provision was declared to be in violation of European Convention on Human Rights in 2011, but the necessary changes to the constitution were not implemented before the election.

== Election campaign ==
The election campaign started in April 2012, when the President of Lithuania, Dalia Grybauskaitė, officially announced the election date. Before the elections, five parties were expected to win representation in the Seimas based on the opinion polls: opposition Social Democrats, Order and Justice and Labour, as well as the ruling Homeland Union and Liberal Movement.

Social Democratic Party, led by Algirdas Butkevičius, had been ahead in the polls for most of the year before the elections. Focusing on the public dissatisfaction with the government of Andrius Kubilius, Social Democrats promised to end the hated austerity measures and increase public spending, even as analysts suggested it would have little room to maneuver.

Populist Labour Party had consistently ranked second in the polls, led by Russian-born businessman-turned-politician Viktor Uspaskich. As part of the election campaign, the party promised to reduce unemployment and massively increase the minimum wage. The party's vague but attractive message resonated with voters despite Uspaskich and the party long being under criminal investigation in Lithuania for false bookkeeping and tax evasion.

Order and Justice was led by another controversial politician, Rolandas Paksas. Paksas, who was elected the President of Lithuania in 2003 and impeached in 2004. The lifetime ban preventing Paksas from running for office was deemed in violation of European Convention on Human Rights in 2011, creating the prospect of him heading the electoral list of Order and Justice. Nevertheless, the constitutional court ruled that amendments to the constitution were required to implement the decision, and Paksas was prevented from running. Order and Justice campaigned on an anti-corruption platform, also promising to reduce inequality and reduce unemployment by distributing state land to farmers.

Homeland Union, which had led the government for the preceding four years, and their coalition partners Liberal Movement took much of the blame for the unpopular austerity measures, suffering in the polls as a result. However, the Homeland Union exceeded expectations in the municipal elections in 2011, garnering the second-largest share of the vote (behind the Social Democrats), raising hopes that both parties could take advantage of the improving economic situation following the Great Recession. President Grybauskaitė, foreign governments and the International Monetary Fund had also praised the government for the measures it took to avoid insolvency during the economic crisis.

Other significant parties featuring in the polls included the Electoral Action of Poles in Lithuania, a party with substantial support in areas with significant Polish and Russian minorities, the Way of Courage, a party focused on fighting an alleged pedophile conspiracy, and YES, a movement led by the Mayor of Vilnius Artūras Zuokas.

== Politicians not standing ==
- Česlovas Juršėnas (LSDP)

== Opinion polls ==
	Parties											Won't vote	Don't know
	TS-KD	TT	LSDP	DP	LRLS	LiCS	LLRA	LVŽS	DK	YES	Other	Won't vote	Don't know
Previous elections
Seats	45	15	25	10	11	8	3	3	New	New	-	-	-
PR vote, %	19.6	12.7	11.8	9.0	5.7	5.3	4.8	3.7	-	-	-	-	-
Polls by "Spinter tyrimai" for Delfi.lt (% of respondents)
March 2012	8.2	9.0	12.0	14.8	7.2	1.3	-	4.2	5.0	-	2.6	29.6	6.1
April 2012	7.7	10.4	14.1	12.6	5.8	1.1	-	2.4	4.2	-	2.9	28.4	10.4
May 2012	7.2	9.3	13.6	12.3	5.7	1.3	-	2.0	3.9	-	2.9	30.2	11.6
June 2012	8.5	11.2	14.2	13.3	6.1	1.5	-	1.3	4.5	3.5	1.2	25.0	9.7
July 2012	7.7	9.4	17.9	16.9	5.2	1.0	1.7	3.2	3.8	1.6	0.6	20.2	10.8
August 2012	7.6	9.5	16.3	14.5	4.8	2.2	1.9	2.3	3.7	3.7	1.1	22.6	9.8
September 2012	7.9	8.2	16.9	15.8	5.8	2.6	2.8	2.7	2.7	3.9	1.7	21.3	7.7
Polls by Vilmorus for Lietuvos Rytas (% of respondents with an opinion)
September 2012	12.3	13.9	23.4	21.1	5.3	2.7	1.5	3.5	1.5	6.5	-	11.6	28.1

Note: The National Resurrection Party (16 seats) had merged into the Liberal and Center Union in 2011. The New Union (Social Liberals) (1 seat) had merged into the Labour Party during the same year. Additionally, four seats were held by independent candidates.

== Results ==
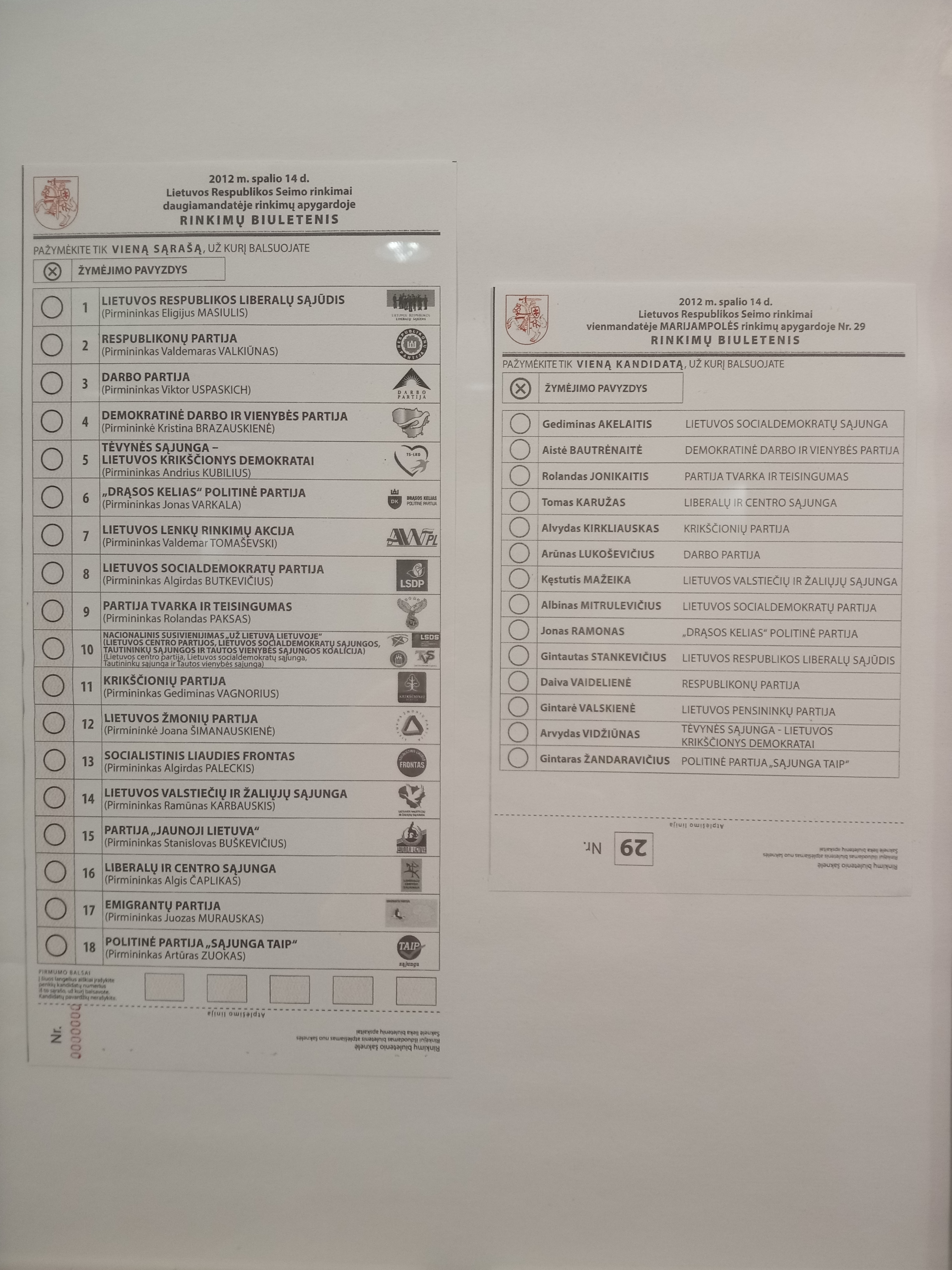
Ballot papers for nationwide proportional (left) and single mandate constituency (right) voting

The elections resulted in a win for Social Democratic Party, which took 38 seats in the Eleventh Seimas (up from 25). Other left-leaning parties performed well, with Labour Party winning 29 seats (up from 10) and Order and Justice getting 11 (down from 15), largely with the support of poorer and rural voters.

The ruling Homeland Union suffered in the elections, winning 33 seats (compared to 45 in the previous elections). The result was attributed to the party paying the price for unpopular austerity measures. Nevertheless, their result was better than had been expected before the elections, and the party was able to maintain its advantage in the second-largest city Kaunas, a historical stronghold of the party, as well as move ahead in the capital Vilnius for the first time. Their coalition partners, the Liberal Movement (10 seats, down from 11), secured the lead in Lithuania's third largest city, Klaipėda.

Party or alliance		Proportional			Constituency (first round)			Constituency (second round)			Total seats	+/–
Party or alliance		Votes	%	Seats	Votes	%	Seats	Votes	%	Seats	Total seats	+/–
Labour Party		271,520	20.69	17	217,914	16.87	1	193,563	23.38	11	29	+19
Social Democratic Party of Lithuania		251,610	19.18	15	222,953	17.26	1	181,160	21.89	22	38	+13
Homeland Union		206,590	15.75	13	215,257	16.66	0	233,515	28.21	20	33	–12
Liberal Movement		117,476	8.95	7	95,166	7.37	0	35,814	4.33	3	10	–1
The Way of Courage		109,448	8.34	7	88,871	6.88	0	44,622	5.39	0	7	New
Order and Justice		100,120	7.63	6	104,997	8.13	0	46,638	5.63	5	11	–4
Electoral Action of Poles in Lithuania		79,840	6.08	5	75,686	5.86	1	36,906	4.46	2	8	+5
Peasant and Greens Union		53,141	4.05	0	61,981	4.80	0	11,430	1.38	1	1	–2
Liberal and Centre Union		28,263	2.15	0	58,792	4.55	0	11,905	1.44	0	0	–8
YES		24,129	1.84	0	33,295	2.58	0				0	New
Socialist People's Front		16,515	1.26	0	5,820	0.45	0				0	0
Christian Party		16,494	1.26	0	15,480	1.20	0				0	New
For Lithuania in Lithuania	LCP	12,854	0.98	0	3,146	0.24	0				0	0
For Lithuania in Lithuania	LSDS	12,854	0.98	0	9,343	0.72	0				0	0
For Lithuania in Lithuania	TS	12,854	0.98	0	7,231	0.56	0				0	New
For Lithuania in Lithuania	TVS	12,854	0.98	0	3,380	0.26	0				0	New
Young Lithuania		8,632	0.66	0	2,595	0.20	0				0	0
Democratic Labour and Unity Party		4,383	0.33	0	6,692	0.52	0				0	New
Emigrant Party		4,015	0.31	0	1,586	0.12	0				0	New
Republican Party		3,661	0.28	0	6,283	0.49	0				0	New
Lithuanian People's Party		3,399	0.26	0							0	New
Independents					55,505	4.30	0	32,173	3.89	3	3	–1
Vacant										1	1	+1
Total		1,312,090	100.00	70	1,291,973	100.00	3	827,726	100.00	68	141	0
Valid votes		1,312,090	95.77		1,291,973	94.31		827,726	94.52			
Invalid/blank votes		57,924	4.23		77,936	5.69		47,955	5.48			
Total votes		1,370,014	100.00		1,369,909	100.00		875,681	100.00			
Registered voters/turnout		2,588,418	52.93		2,588,418	52.92		2,438,641	35.91			
Source: Central Electoral Commission

Election results in one constituency were declared invalid by the Central Election Commission due to allegations of vote-buying. The parliament subsequently invalidated the results of another constituency due to voting irregularities following a verdict of the constitutional court. New elections were held in the two constituencies, as well as in another where the member of the parliament (Julius Veselka) had died in office, on 3 March 2013, with a run-off on 17 March. As a result, Social Democrats gained one seat from the table above.

== Voting irregularities ==
Allegations of vote buying surfaced after the first round of the elections. In total, the police has investigated 27 cases of possible irregularities, including 18 suspected cases of vote buying, mostly involving the Labour Party. The Central Electoral Commission, as well as prosecution authorities, claimed that two Labour Party members had purchased votes and the Commission invalidated the results in one single-seat constituency. Labour Party leader Uspaskich denounced the allegations as politically motivated and warned that no one should disrespect the popular choice.

== Government formation ==
Following the elections, the winning Social Democrats proposed forming a government coalition with the Labour Party and Order and Justice, with Algirdas Butkevičius as the designated Prime Minister. President Grybauskaitė indicated that she would not accept the Labour Party as part of the government, due to the allegation of electoral fraud and fraudulent bookkeeping. The outgoing prime minister Kubilius presented the Homeland Union as an alternative coalition partner, a suggestion that Butkevičius quickly rejected.

After the longest period of government formation in modern Lithuanian history, a coalition government consisting of Social Democrats, Labour, Order and Justice and the Electoral Action of Poles in Lithuania was appointed in December. President Grybauskaitė confirmed the government after initially rejecting all of the ministers proposed by the Labour Party.
