= Ninth Seimas =

Ninth Seimas of Lithuania
←	Eighth Seimas of Lithuania	Tenth Seimas of Lithuania	→
- Seimas Palace

Overview
- Legislative body: Seimas
- Jurisdiction: Lithuania
- Term: 2004—2008

The Ninth Seimas of Lithuania was a parliament (Seimas) elected in Lithuania. Elections took place on 10 October 2004, with the run-off on 24 October. The Seimas commenced its work on 15 November 2004 and served a four-year term, with the last session on 16 November 2008.

== Elections ==
In the elections in 2004, 70 members of the parliament were elected on proportional party lists and 71 in single member constituencies. Elections took place on 10 October 2004. Run-off elections were held on 24 October in the single-seat constituencies where no candidate secured a seat in the first round.

Party or alliance		Proportional			Constituency			Total seats
Party or alliance		Votes	%	Seats	Votes	%	Seats	Total seats
Labour Party (DP)		340,035	28.4	22		21.4	17	39
Working for Lithuania (UDL)	Social Democratic Party of Lithuania	246,852	20.7	16		17.6	15	20
Working for Lithuania (UDL)	New Union (Social Liberals)	246,852	20.7	16		17.6	15	11
Homeland Union (Lithuanian Conservatives) (TS)		176,409	14.8	11		14.4	14	25
For the Order and Justice (TT)	Liberal Democratic Party	135,807	11.3	9		8.4	1	10
For the Order and Justice (TT)	Lithuanian People's Union For a Fair Lithuania	135,807	11.3	9		8.4	1	10
Liberal and Centre Union (LiCS)		109,872	9.2	7		12.4	11	18
Peasants and New; Democratic Party Union (VNDPS)	Lithuanian Peasants Party	78,902	6.6	5		7.7	5	10
Peasants and New; Democratic Party Union (VNDPS)	New Democracy Party	78,902	6.6	5		7.7	5	10
Electoral Action of Poles in Lithuania (LLRA)		45,302	3.8	0		4.5	2	2
Christian Conservative Social Union		23,426	1.9	0		1.9	0	0
Lithuanian Christian Democrats		16,362	1.4	0		2.5	0	0
National Centre Party		5,989	0.5	0			0	0
Republican Party		4,326	0.4	0			0	0
Union of Lithuanian Socialists		3,977	0.3	0			0	0
Lithuanian Liberty Union		3,337	0.3	0		0.2	0	0
National Party Lithuanian Road		2,577	0.2	0		0.5	0	0
Lithuanian Nationalist Union		2,482	0.2	0			0	0
Young Lithuania		–	–	–		0.2	0	0
Lithuanian Russian Union		–	–	–		0.2	0	0
Independents		–	–	–			6	6
Invalid/blank votes		32,998	–	–	67,149	–	–	–
Total		1,228,653	100	70	1,227,648	100	71	141
Registered voters/turnout		2,666,196	46.1	–	2,666,199	46.1	–	–
Source: Nohlen & Stöver, Strathclyde University, VRK

== Activities ==
Speaker of the Seimas

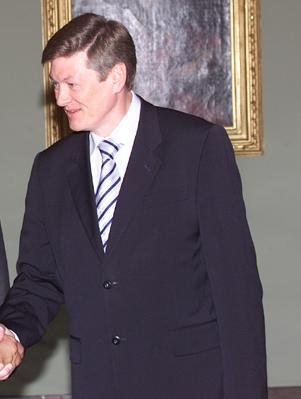
Artūras Paulauskas (New Union (Social Liberals))
15 November 2004 - 11 April 2006

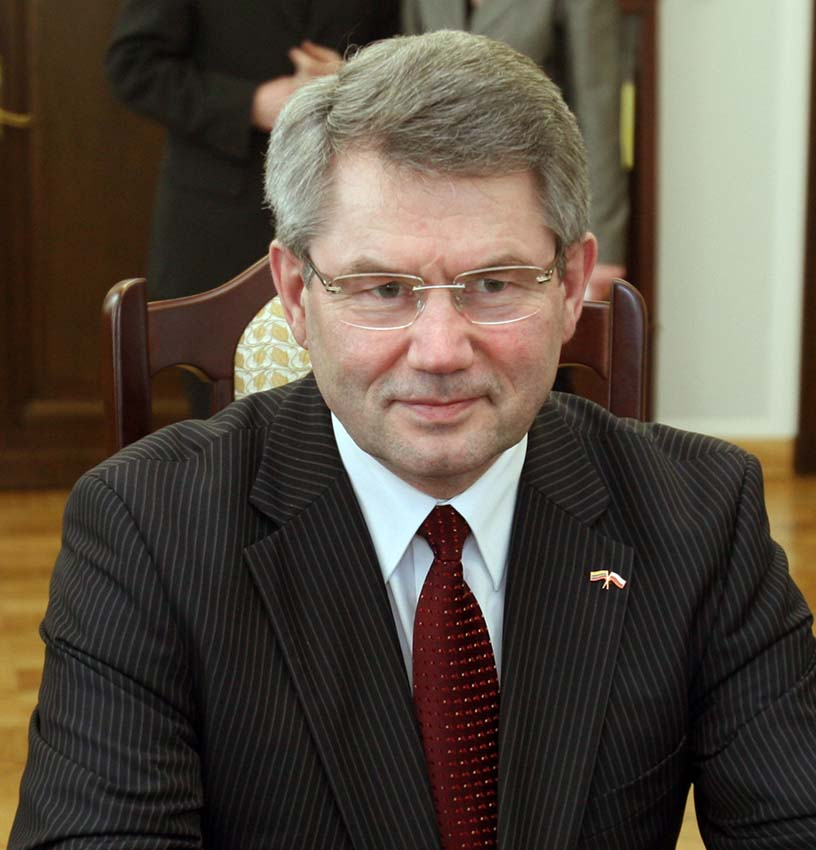
Viktoras Muntianas (Labor Party/Civic Democratic Party)
13 April 2006 - 1 April 2008

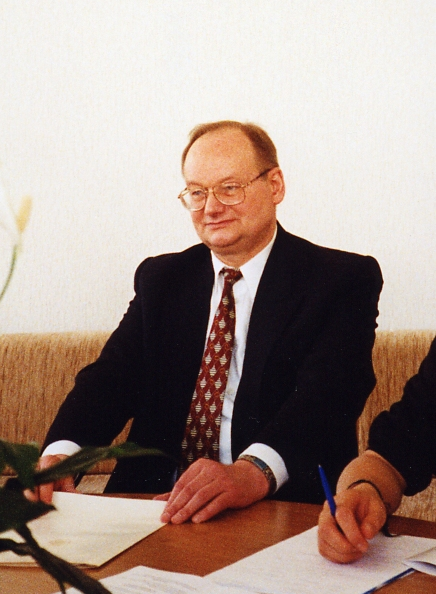
Česlovas Juršėnas (Social Democrats)
1 April 2008 - 17 November 2008

After the elections, Social Democrats led the coalition together with the New Union (Social Liberals), Labor and Peasants and New Democratic Party Union. Artūras Paulauskas was reelected as the Speaker of the Ninth Seimas, having served as the Speaker in the previous term.

In April 2006 the parliament expressed no confidence in the Speaker and Paulauskas was forced to resign, taking New Union out of the coalition. He was replaced as the Speaker of the Seimas by Viktoras Muntianas of Labor Party, who soon left the party to form Civic Democratic Party.

After another disagreement in May 2006, Labor Party joined the opposition. The decision was affected by the decision of the leader of the Party Viktor Uspaskich to resign as the Minister of the Economy after being accused of conflicts of interest. Opposition Liberal and Centre Union joined the minority government that ruled with some support of other opposition parties. At the beginning of 2008 New Union rejoined the coalition. Viktoras Muntianas resigned as the Speaker of the Seimas after a corruption scandal in April 2008 and Česlovas Juršėnas was elected in his stead.

This parliament passed legislation for possible introduction of euro.

== Composition ==
=== Parliamentary groups ===
During the first session of the Seimas the following parliamentary groups were registered: Social Democratic Party of Lithuania (LSDPF), Labour Party (DPF), Liberal and Centre (LCSF), Liberal Democrats (LDF), New Union (NSF), Homeland Union (TSF), Peasant and New Democracy (VNDF, later VLF) and the Mixed Group of Members of the Seimas (MSNG).

The term of the Seimas was noted for particularly significant shifts among parliamentary groups. For example, only 20 Social Democrats were elected to the Seimas, but Social Democratic Party political group in the Seimas had 38 members at the end of the term. Parliamentary groups formed during the term included Liberals (LF), Order and Justice Liberal Democrats (TTLDF), Civic Democratic (PDF), as well as Peasant Popular and Civic Democratic (VLPDF) groups.

By the end of the term of the Seimas, the following parliamentary groups were active.

Composition of the Seimas at the end of 2004-2008 term.
Name	Abbr.	Members
Social Democratic Party of Lithuania	LSDPF	38
Homeland Union	TSF	26
Labor Party	DPF	23
Peasant Popular Union	VLF	14
Order and Justice	TTLDF	11
Liberal and Center Union	LCSF	10
New Union (Social Liberals)	NSF	9
Liberal Movement	LSF	9
Others	MSNG	1

=== Members ===
A total of 158 members served on the Ninth Seimas.

Name, Surname	Constituency	Electoral list	Parliamentary group	Notes
Remigijus Ačas	Nationwide	TT	LDF; TTLDF (from 23 May 2006)	
Vilija Aleknaitė-Abramikienė	Nationwide	TS	TSF	
Petras Auštrevičius	Senamiesčio	LiCS	LCSF; LF (from 20 October 2005); LSF (from 26 April 2006)	
Audronius Ažubalis	Nationwide	TS	TSF	
Petras Baguška	Nationwide	DP	DPF; MSNG (from 22 December 2005); PDF (from 2 May 2006); VLPDF (from 8 May 2007); PDF (from 17 January 2008); LSDPF (from 4 April 2008)	From 21 December 2004
Zigmantas Balčytis	Šilalės – Šilutės	UDL	LSDPF	
Aldona Balsienė	Nationwide	TT	LDF	Until 17 March 2006
Virginija Baltraitienė	Nationwide	DP	DPF	From 13 December 2005
Dailis Alfonsas Barakauskas	Nationwide	TT	LDF; TTLDF (from 23 May 2006)	From 18 March 2006
Andrius Baranauskas	Nationwide	DP	DPF; PDF (from 2 May 2006); VLPDF (from 8 May 2007); PDF (from 17 January 2008); LSDPF (from 4 April 2008)	
Rimantas Bašys	Saulės	DP	DPF	
Rima Baškienė	Šiaulių kaimiškoji	VNDPS	VNDF; VLF (from 13 December 2005); VLPDF (from 8 May 2007); VLF (18 January 2008)	
Danutė Bekintienė	Karoliniškių	TS	TSF	
Juozas Bernatonis	Nationwide	UDL	LSDPF	From 16 April 2007
Vilija Blinkevičiūtė	Šeškinės	UDL	NSF; LSDPF (from 25 May 2006)	
Kazys Bobelis	Nationwide	VNDPS	VNDF; VLF (from 13 December 2005); LDF (from 20 April 2006); TTLDF (from 23 May 2006)	Until 31 May 2006
Vytautas Bogušis	Nationwide	LiCS	LCSF	
Violeta Boreikienė	Nationwide	LiCS	LCSF; MSNG (from 18 October 2005); LSF (from 25 April 2006); LSDPF (from 27 March 2007)	
Antanas Bosas	Baltijos	DP	DPF	
Bronius Bradauskas	Kaišiadorių – Elektrėnų	UDL	LSDPF	
Saulius Bucevičius	Akmenės – Joniškio	DP	DPF	
Valentinas Bukauskas	Telšių	DP	DPF	
Algirdas Butkevičius	Vilkaviškio	UDL	LSDPF	
Gintautas Bužinskas	Nationwide	DP	DPF	Until 20 December 2004
Algis Čaplikas	Žirmūnų	LiCS	LCSF	
Jonas Čekuolis	Nationwide	LiCS	LCSF	From 16 November 2004
Vytautas Čepas	Nationwide	LiCS	LCSF; LF (from 20 October 2005); LSF (from 20 April 2006); LSDPF (from 4 July 2007)	
Vida Marija Čigriejienė	Panemunės	Independent	TSF	
Rimantas Jonas Dagys	Šilainių	TS	TSF	
Kęstutis Daukšys	Nationwide	DP	DPF	
Julius Dautartas	Nevėžio	TS	TSF	
Irena Degutienė	Naujamiesčio	TS	TSF	
Virginijus Domarkas	Kretingos	DP	DPF; VLF (from 19 July 2006); VLPDF (from 8 May 2007); VLF (from 18 January 2008)	
Vytautas Sigitas Draugelis	Suvalkijos	DP	DPF	
Arimantas Dumčius	Kalniečių	TS	TSF	
Audrius Endzinas	Šilutės – Pagėgių	Independent	LCSF; LF (from 20 October 2005); LSF (from 20 April 2006)	
Algirdas Gaižutis	Nationwide	VNDPS	-	13 June 2006
Vytautas Galvonas	Anykščių – Kupiškio	TT	LDF; TTLDF (from 23 May 2006)	
Ramūnas Garbaravičius	Nationwide	TS	TSF	
Aidas Gedvilas	Nationwide	DP	DPF	Until 16 January 2005
Vydas Gedvilas	Nationwide	DP	DPF	
Saulius Girdauskas	Nationwide	DP	DPF	
Kęstutis Glaveckas	Dainavos	LiCS	LCSF; LF (from 20 October 2005); LSF (from 20 April 2006)	
Loreta Graužinienė	Nationwide	DP	DPF	
Petras Gražulis	Gargždų	Independent	MSNG; TTLDF (from 11 September 2007)	
Vytautas Grubliauskas	Danės	LiCS	LCSF; LF (from 20 October 2005); LSF (from 20 April 2006)	
Algirdas Ivanauskas	Nationwide	DP	DPF; PDF (from 2 May 2006); VLPDF (from 8 May 2007); PDF (from 17 January 2008); LSDPF (from 4 April 2008)	
Jonas Jagminas	Plungės – Rietavo	DP	DPF; LSDPF (from 14 September 2006)	
Gediminas Jakavonis	Nationwide	UDL	NSF; VLF (16 July 2008)	
Povilas Jakučionis	Nationwide	TS	TSF	
Donatas Jankauskas	Kauno kaimiškoji	TS	TSF	
Juozas Jaruševičius	Jonavos	DP	DPF; PDF (from 2 May 2006); VLPDF (from 8 May 2007); PDF (from 17 January 2008); LSDPF (from 4 April 2008)	
Rasa Juknevičienė	Žaliakalnio	TS	TSF	
Jonas Juozapaitis	Pakruojo – Joniškio	UDL	LSDPF	
Česlovas Juršėnas	Ignalinos – Švenčionių	UDL	LSDPF	
Vytautas Kamblevičius	Nationwide	DP	DPF; TTDPF (from 10 March 2008)	From 17 January 2005
Vaclovas Karbauskis	Tauragės	UDL	NSF	
Justinas Karosas	Lazdijų – Druskininkų	UDL	LSDPF	
Etela Karpickienė	Nationwide	DP	DPF	From 13 April 2006
Algis Kašėta	Varėnos – Eišiškių	LiCS	LCSF; LF (from 20 October 2005); LSF (from 20 April 2006)	
Gediminas Kirkilas	Nationwide	UDL	LSDPF	
Egidijus Klumbys	Nationwide	TT	LDF; TTLDF (from 23 May 2006)	
Romualda Kšanienė	Nationwide	DP	DPF	
Andrius Kubilius	Antakalnio	TS	TSF	
Rytas Kupčinskas	Aleksoto – Vilijampolės	TS	TSF	
Saulius Lapėnas	Jurbarko	LiCS	LCSF	
Arminas Lydeka	Nationwide	LiCS	LCSF	
Jonas Lionginas	Nationwide	DP	DPF; PDF (from 2 May 2006); LSDPF (from 3 May 2007)	
Vincė Vaidevutė Margevičienė	Centro	TS	TSF	
Bronius Markauskas	Nationwide	VNDPS	-	1 June 2006
Vilma Martinkaitienė	Nationwide	DP	DPF	
Eligijus Masiulis	Nationwide	LiCS	LCSF; LF (from 20 October 2005); LSF (from 20 April 2006)	
Antanas Matulas	Pasvalio – Panevėžio	TS	TSF	
Algimantas Matulevičius	Nationwide	TT	LDF; PDF (from 2 May 2006); VLPDF (from 8 May 2007); PDF (from 17 January 2008); MSNG (from 4 April 2008)	
Valentinas Mazuronis	Nationwide	TT	LDF; TTLDF (from 23 May 2006)	
Stasys Mikelis	Nationwide	DP	DPF	Until 23 March 2006
Gintautas Mikolaitis	Raseinių	UDL	LSDPF	
Dangutė Mikutienė	Trakų – Elektrėnų	Independent	DPF	
Zenonas Mikutis	Kelmės	DP	DPF	
Laima Mogenienė	Nationwide	VNDPS	VNDPF; VLF (13 December 2005); VLPDF (from 8 May 2007); VLF (from 18 January 2008)	
Algirdas Monkevičius	Nationwide	UDL	NSF	
Viktoras Muntianas	Kauno – Kėdainių	DP	DPF; PDF (from 17 January 2008); LSDPF (from 4 April 2008)	
Vytas Navickas	Nationwide	VNDPS	VNDF; VLF (from 13 December 2005); VLPDF (from 8 May 2007); VLF (from 18 January 2008)	
Juozas Olekas	Nationwide	UDL	LSDPF	
Vladimir Orechov	Nationwide	DP	DPF; PDF (from 2 May 2006); VLPDF (from 8 May 2007); PDF (from 17 January 2008); LSDPF (from 4 April 2008)	
Skirmantas Pabedinskas	Nationwide	DP	DPF; VLF (from 19 July 2006); VLPDF (from 8 May 2007); VLF (from 18 January 2008)	
Žilvinas Padaiga	Nationwide	DP	-	Until 15 November 2004
Raimundas Palaitis	Pajūrio	LiCS	LCSF	
Algirdas Paleckis	Nationwide	UDL	LSDPF	Until 15 April 2007
Juozas Palionis	Prienų	UDL	LSDPF	
Artūras Paulauskas	Nationwide	UDL	NSF	
Bronius Pauža	Nationwide	DP	DPF; LSDPF (from 26 September 2006)	
Marija Aušrinė Pavilionienė	Nationwide	TT	LDF; TTLDF (from 23 May 2006); LSDPF (from 25 October 2007)	
Rolandas Pavilionis	Nationwide	TT	LDF	Until 15 November 2004
Saulius Pečeliūnas	Nationwide	TS	TSF	
Alfredas Pekeliūnas	Aukštaitijos	VNDPS	VNDF; VLF (from 13 December 2005); VLPDF (from 8 May 2007); VLF (18 January 2008)	
Milda Petrauskienė	Nationwide	UDL	LSDPF	
Jonas Pinskus	Nationwide	DP	DPF	From 21 December 2004
Audronė Pitrėnienė	Skuodo – Mažeikių	DP	DPF	
Leokadija Počikovska	Širvintų – Vilniaus	LLRA	VNDF; VLF (from 13 December 2005); VLPDF (from 8 May 2007); VLF (18 January 2008)	
Vladimiras Prudnikovas	Nationwide	DP	DPF	Until 20 December 2004
Kazimira Danutė Prunskienė	Molėtų – Švenčionių	VNDPS	VNDF; VLF (from 13 December 2005); VLPDF (from 8 May 2007); VLF (18 January 2008)	
Edmundas Pupinis	Utenos	TS	TSF	
Jonas Ramonas	Šakių	VNDPS	VNDF; VLF (from 13 December 2005); MSNG (from 9 January 2006); PDF (from 4 May 2006); MSNG (from 8 May 2007); LCSF (from 10 May 2007); TTLDF (from 26 September 2007)	
Jurgis Razma	Nationwide	TS	TSF	
Rimantas Remeika	Justiniškių	LiCS	LCSF	
Algis Rimas	Marijampolės	UDL	LSDPF	
Viktoras Rinkevičius	Biržų – Kupiškio	VNDPS	VNDF; VLF (from 13 December 2005); VLPDF (from 8 May 2007); VLF (18 January 2008)	
Bronis Ropė	Nationwide	VNDPS	-	Until 15 November 2004
Irina Rozova	Nationwide	VNDPS	VLF; VLPDF (from 8 May 2007); VLF (18 January 2008)	From 11 July 2006
Julius Sabatauskas	Alytaus	Independent	LSDPF	
Liudvikas Sabutis	Nationwide	TS	TSF	
Alvydas Sadeckas	Nationwide	UDL	NSF	
Algimantas Salamakinas	Nationwide	UDL	LSDPF	
Vytautas Saulis	Rokiškio	UDL	LSDPF	
Albertas Sereika	Nationwide	TT	LDF; LSDPF (from 30 June 2005)	
Valerijus Simulik	Dainų	UDL	NSF	
Kazys Sivickis	Nationwide	VNDPS	-	29 June 2006
Algirdas Sysas	Nationwide	UDL	LSDPF	
Artūras Skardžius	Nationwide	UDL	NSF; MSNG (from 20 July 2006); VLF (from 17 October 2006); VLPDF (from 8 May 2007); VLF (18 January 2008)	
Rimantas Smetona	Nationwide	VNDPS	VNDF; MSNG (from 17 June 2005); LDF (from 2 May 2006); TTLDF (from 23 May 2006)	
Vaclav Stankevič	Marių	UDL	NSF	
Aldona Staponkienė	Nationwide	VNDPS	VNDF; VLF (from 13 December 2005); VLPDF (from 8 May 2007); VLF (18 January 2008)	From 16 November 2004
Kazys Starkevičius	Pramonės	TS	TSF	
Antanas Napoleonas Stasiškis	Nationwide	TS	TSF	
Nijolė Steiblienė	Nationwide	UDL	NSF	
Gintaras Steponavičius	Lazdynų	LiCS	LCSF; LF (from 20 October 2005); LSF (from 20 April 2006)	
Mindaugas Subačius	Nationwide	DP	DPF; LSDPF (from 7 December 2007)	From 16 November 2004
Rytis Šatkauskas	Nationwide	DP	-	From 2 April 2006 until 4 April 2006
Irena Šiaulienė	Nationwide	UDL	LSDPF	
Gintaras Šileikis	Vakarinė	LiCS	LCSF; LF (from 20 October 2005); LSF (from 20 April 2006)	
Viačeslav Škil	Nationwide	DP	DPF; LSDPF (from 11 September 2007)	
Raimondas Šukys	Fabijoniškių	LiCS	LCSF	
Dalia Teišerskytė	Nationwide	LiCS	LCSF; LF (from 20 October 2005); LSF (from 20 April 2006)	
Valdemar Tomaševski	Vilniaus – Šalčininkų	LLRA	VNDF; VLF (from 13 December 2005); VLPDF (from 8 May 2007); VLF (18 January 2008)	
Rimvydas Turčinskas	Nationwide	DP	DPF; PDF (from 2 May 2006); LSDPF (from 3 May 2007)	
Gema Umbrasienė	Nationwide	VNDPS	-	22 June 2006
Viktor Uspaskich	Kėdainių	DP	DPF	Until 22 June 2005
Antanas Valionis	Nationwide	UDL	NSF	
Ona Valiukevičiūtė	Nationwide	TT	LDF; TTLDF (from 23 May 2006)	
Egidijus Vareikis	Nationwide	TS	TSF	
Romas Venclovas	Mažeikių	DP	DPF; PDF (from 2 May 2006); VLPDF (from 8 May 2007); PDF (from 17 January 2008); DPF (from 30 January 2008)	
Vilija Vertelienė	Nationwide	DP	DPF; LSDPF (14 September 2006)	
Birutė Vėsaitė	Nationwide	UDL	LSDPF	
Julius Veselka	Ukmergės	TT	LDF; TTLDF (from 23 May 2006); MSNG (from 14 December 2006); TTLDF (from 25 October 2007)	
Pranas Vilkas	Nationwide	DP	DPF; LSDPF (from 3 October 2006); DPF (from 19 October 2006)	
Ramunė Visockytė	Nationwide	DP	DPF	
Vladimiras Volčiok	Vilniaus – Trakų	DP	DPF; LCSF (from 21 December 2007)	
Algirdas Vrubliauskas	Dzūkijos	TS	TSF	Until 11 April 2007
Emanuelis Zingeris	Nationwide	TS	TSF	
Jadvyga Zinkevičiūtė	Naujosios Vilnios	DP	DPF	
Artūras Zuokas	Nationwide	LiCS	-	Until 15 November 2004
Edvardas Žakaris	Aušros	UDL	LSDPF	
Roma Žakaitienė	Nationwide	UDL	LSDPF	
Vidmantas Žiemelis	Nationwide	TS	TSF; MSNG (from 19 October 2006); TSF (from 27 June 2008)	
Manfredas Žymantas	Zarasų – Visagino	DP	DPF	
Henrikas Žukauskas	Nationwide	TT	DPF; MSNG (from 9 December 2004); PDF (from 2 May 2006); MSNG (from 8 May 2007); LCSF (from 10 May 2007)	
Zita Žvikienė	Radviliškio	DP	DPF	
