= Eighth Seimas =

Eighth Seimas of Lithuania
←	Seventh Seimas of Lithuania	Ninth Seimas of Lithuania	→
- Seimas Palace

Overview
- Legislative body: Seimas
- Jurisdiction: Lithuania
- Term: 2000—2004

The Eighth Seimas of Lithuania was a parliament (Seimas) elected in Lithuania. Elections took place on 8 October 2000. The Seimas commenced its work on 19 October 2000 and served a four-year term, with the last session on 11 November 2004.

== Elections ==
In the elections in 2000, 70 members of the parliament were elected on proportional party lists and 71 in single member constituencies. Elections took place on 8 October 2000. No run-off was held in single seat constituencies and the candidate with the most votes was declared a winner.

Liberal Union became the largest party in the parliament after winning 34 seats, followed by 29 seats won by New Union (Social Liberals). The Social-Democratic Coalition of Algirdas Brazauskas won 51 seats, with the largest party in the coalition, Democratic Labour Party of Lithuania, winning 26.

Party		Abbr.	Proportional			Constituency			Total seats
Party		Abbr.	Votes	%	Seats	Votes	%	Seats	Total seats
Social-Democratic; Coalition of Algirdas Brazauskas	Democratic Labour Party of Lithuania	LDDP	457,294	31.08	12	156,354	10.66	14	26
Social-Democratic; Coalition of Algirdas Brazauskas	Social Democratic Party of Lithuania	LSDP	457,294	31.08	12	120,672	8.23	7	19
Social-Democratic; Coalition of Algirdas Brazauskas	Union of the Russians of Lithuania		457,294	31.08	3	4,446	0.3	0	3
Social-Democratic; Coalition of Algirdas Brazauskas	New Democracy Party	ND	457,294	31.08	1	12,454	0.85	2	3
New Union (Social Liberals)^{[a]}		NS	288,895	19.64	18	225,878	15.41	11	29
Liberal Union of Lithuania^{[a]}		LLS	253,823	17.25	16	229,438	15.65	18	34
Homeland Union – Lithuanian Conservatives		TSLK	126,850	8.62	8	104,631	7.14	1	9
Christian Democratic Union		LKDS	61,583	4.19	0	33,221	2.27	1	1
Lithuanian Peasants Party		LVP	60,040	4.08	0	96,853	6.61	4	4
Lithuanian Christian Democratic Party		LKDP	45,227	3.07	0	69,827	4.76	2	2
Lithuanian Centre Union		LCS	42,030	2.86	0	89,837	6.13	2	2
Union of Moderate Conservatives		NKS	29,615	2.01	0	42,116	2.87	1	1
Electoral Action of Poles in Lithuania		LLRA	28,641	1.95	0	40,376	2.75	2	2
Lithuanian People's Union "For Just Lithuania"			21,583	1.47	0	5,323	0.36	0	0
Lithuanian Liberty Union		LLS	18,622	1.27	0	23,202	1.58	1	1
Union of Young Lithuania, New Nationalists and Political Prisoners		JL	16,941	1.15	0	16,729	1.14	1	1
Lithuanian; Nationalist Union	Lithuanian Nationalists Union		12,884	0.88	0	5,567	0.38	0	0
Lithuanian; Nationalist Union	Lithuanian Liberty League		12,884	0.88	0	4,685	0.32	0	0
Lithuanian Party "Social Democracy – 2000"			7,219	0.49	0	32,336	2.21	0	0
Modern Christian-Democratic Union^{[a]}		MKDS	–	–	–	17,929	1.22	1	1
Lithuanian Union of Political Prisoners and Deportees			–	–	–	8,495	0.58	0	0
Homeland People's Party			–	–	–	7,038	0.48	0	0
National Democratic Party of Lithuania			–	–	–	5,082	0.35	0	0
Lithuanian Democratic Party			–	–	–	3,323	0.23	0	0
Lithuanian Socialist Party			–	–	–	1,701	0.12	0	0
Republican Party			–	–	–	1,380	0.09	0	0
Lithuanian Justice Party			–	–	–	515	0.04	0	0
Independents			–	–	–	106,806	7.28	3	3
Invalid/blank votes			68,496	–	–	73,517	–	–	–
Total			1,539,743	100	70	1,539,743	100	71	141
Registered voters/turnout			2,626,321	58.63	–	2,626,321	58.63	–	–
Source: University of Essex

^{a} Two Modern Christian-Democratic Union candidates were elected in the proportional vote, having run on the lists of the New Union (Social Liberals) and the Liberal Union of Lithuania.

== Activities ==
Speaker of the Seimas

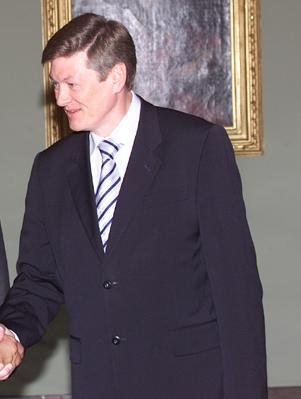
Artūras Paulauskas (New Union (Social Liberals))
19 October 2000 - 14 November 2004

Artūras Paulauskas was elected as the Speaker of the Eighth Seimas. After the impeachment of Rolandas Paksas, Paulauskas acted as the President of Lithuania from 6 April 2004 until 12 July 2004. Česlovas Juršėnas acted as the Speaker of the Seimas during the time.

The Eighth Seimas saw an initial ruling coalition of Liberals and New Union (Social Liberals), which lasted less than a year. By July 2001, New Union (Social Liberals) joined the Social Democratic Coalition, headed by Algirdas Brazauskas. Under the term of the Seimas, Lithuania joined the European Union and NATO. It continued privatizations of energy enterprises (e. g. Lietuvos dujos and Lietuvos energija). Also this Seimas oversaw the impeachment of President of Republic Rolandas Paksas.

== Composition ==
=== Parliamentary groups ===
During the first session of the Seimas the following parliamentary groups were registered: Social Democratic Coalition, Liberals, New Union (Social Liberals), Homeland Union - Conservatives, Peasant and New Democracy Parties and the Mixed Group of Members of the Seimas.

At the beginning of the session, a quota (7 members) for parliamentary group formation has been introduced. This change came after experience with previous Seimas, in which parliamentary group might have been as small as 2 members.

Substantial shifts between parliamentary groups occurred during the term. In 2001, numerous members of the Liberals parliamentary group either joined Independent parliamentary group (in 2002 it renamed itself to the Liberal Democratic parliamentary group) or Homeland Union - Conservatives parliamentary group. In 2003, this parliamentary group was joined by the several members from Mixed Group and formed Liberal and Center parliamentary group.

Similar process happened in New Union (Social Liberals) parliamentary group between 2002 and 2004, when numerous members moved to the Social Democratic Coalition or Liberal Democratic parliamentary group. By the end of the term of the Seimas, the following parliamentary groups were active.

Composition of the Seimas at the end of 2000-2004 term.
Name	Abbr.	Members
Social Democratic Coalition	SDK	53
Liberal and Center	LiCF	21
New Union (Social Liberals)	NSF	19
Liberal Democrats	LDF	15
Homeland Union - Conservatives	TSKF	10
Peasants and New Democracy	VNDPF	7
Others	MSNG	8
Vacant		7

=== Members ===
A total of 151 members served on the Eighth Seimas.

Name, Surname	Constituency	Electoral list	Parliamentary group	Notes
Vilija Aleknaitė-Abramikienė	Nationwide	TSLK	TSLK	From 17 August 2004
Vytenis Andriukaitis	4. Žirmūnų	LSDP	SDKF	Until 24 July 2004
Audronius Ažubalis	Nationwide	TSLK	TSLK	From 23 June 2004 until 28 June 2004
Ona Babonienė	Nationwide	SDK	SDKF	
Gintautas Babravičius	Nationwide	LLS	LF; LiCF (from 5 June 2003)	
Zigmantas Balčytis	33. Šilalės – Šilutės	LDDP	SDKF	
Dailis Alfonsas Barakauskas	23. Aušros	LLS	LF; NF (from 12 January 2002); LDF (from 1 July 2002)	
Vydas Baravykas	69. Dzūkijos	LDDP	SDKF	
Mindaugas Bastys	64. Šakių	LDDP	SDKF	
Antanas Baura	49. Anykščių – Kupiškio	LVP	VNDPF	
Juozas Bernatonis	Nationwide	SDK	SDKF	
Kazys Bobelis	29. Marijampolės	LKDS	MSNG; VNDPF (from 5 July 2004)	
Bronius Bradauskas	59. Kaišiadorių – Elektrėnų	LDDP	SDKF	
Jonas Budrevičius	Nationwide	SDK	SDKF	
Sigita Burbienė	Nationwide	SDK	SDKF	
Stanislovas Buškevičius	15. Kalniečių	JL	MSNG	
Algirdas Butkevičius	68. Vilkaviškio	LSDP	SDKF	
Jonas Čekuolis	Nationwide	LLS	LF	
Jonas Čiulevičius	Nationwide	NS	MSNG	
Gediminas Dalinkevičius	Nationwide	NS	NSF; SDKF (from 21 January 2003)	
Irena Degutienė	Nationwide	TSLK	TSLK	
Gintaras Didžiokas	Nationwide	SDK	VNDPF	Until 22 June 2004
Sergejus Dmitrijevas	Nationwide	SDK	SDKF	
Vytautas Einoris	46. Pakruojo – Joniškio	LDDP	SDKF	
Vasilij Fiodorov	10. Naujosios Vilnios	NS	NSF; MSNG (from 5 July 2004)	
Kęstutis Glaveckas	16. Dainavos	Independent	JF; LiCF (from 5 June 2003)	
Petras Gražulis	31. Gargždų	LKDP	MSNG	
Valentinas Greičiūnas	19. Danės	LDDP	SDKF	
Algirdas Gricius	Nationwide	LLS	LF; LiCF (from 5 June 2003)	
Algimantas Valentinas Indriūnas	Nationwide	NS	NSF	
Gediminas Jakavonis	Nationwide	NS	NSF	
Povilas Jakučionis	Nationwide	TSLK	TSLK	
Jonas Jučas	Nationwide	LLS	LF; LiCF (from 5 June 2003)	
Rasa Juknevičienė	Nationwide	TSLK	TSLK	
Jūratė Juozaitienė	18. Panemunės	LLS	LF; SDKF (from 12 March 2002)	
Jonas Jurkus	38. Mažeikių	LSDP	SDKF	
Česlovas Juršėnas	53. Ignalinos – Švenčionių	LDDP	SDKF	
Vytautas Juškus	Nationwide	SDK	-	2 June 2004
Edvardas Kaniava	Nationwide	SDK	SDKF	
Ramūnas Karbauskis	45. Šiaulių kaimiškoji	LVP	VNDPF	
Vaclovas Karbauskis	34. Tauragės	NS	NSF	
Edvardas Karečka	37.Skuodo – Mažeikių	LVP	VNDPF; SDKF (from 27 May 2003)	
Justinas Karosas	71. Lazdijų – Druskininkų	LDDP	SDKF	
Algis Kašėta	70. Varėnos – Eišiškių	MKDS	JF; LiCF (from 5 June 2003)	
Gediminas Kirkilas	Nationwide	SDK	SDKF	
Dobilas Jonas Kirvelis	Nationwide	SDK	SDKF	From 3 July 2004
Audrius Klišonis	Nationwide	LLS	LF; LiCF (from 5 June 2003)	
Egidijus Klumbys	Nationwide	NS	MSNG	
Gintautas Kniukšta	Nationwide	NS	NSF	
Jonas Korenka	Nationwide	SDK	SDKF	
Jeronimas Kraujelis	Nationwide	NS	NSF	
Kęstutis Kriščiūnas	Nationwide	SDK	SDKF	
Stasys Kružinauskas	Nationwide	SDK	SDKF	
Andrius Kubilius	Nationwide	TSLK	TSLK	
Algirdas Kunčinas	Nationwide	SDK	SDKF	
Dalia Kutraitė-Giedraitienė	2. Senamiesčio	LLS	LF; NF (from 12 January 2002); LDF (from 1 July 2002)	Until 25 February 2003
Kęstutis Kuzmickas	Nationwide	NS	NSF	
Vytautas Kvietkauskas	1. Naujamiesčio	NS	NSF	Until 27 July 2004
Vytautas Landsbergis	Nationwide	TSLK	TSLK	Until 22 June 2004
Saulius Lapėnas	62. Jurbarko	LLS	LF; LiCF (from 5 June 2003)	
Vytautas Lapėnas	Nationwide	LLS	LF; LDF (from 1 July 2002)	
Jonas Lionginas	8. Karoliniškių	LLS	LF; LDF (from 1 July 2002)	
Arminas Lydeka	Nationwide	LLS	LF; LiCF (from 5 June 2003)	
Alfonsas Macaitis	Nationwide	SDK	SDKF	
Zenonas Mačernius	41. Kelmės	LDDP	SDKF	
Eugenijus Maldeikis	Nationwide	LLS	LF; LDF (from 1 July 2002)	
Virginijus Martišauskas	32. Šilutės – Pagėgių	LCS	JF	Until 10 October 2004
Eligijus Masiulis	21. Marių	LLS	LF; LiCF (from 5 June 2003)	
Kęstutis Masiulis	Nationwide	TSLK	-	From 28 July 2004 until 16 August 2004
Algimantas Matulevičius	51. Utenos	LLS	LF; LDF (from 8 April 2003)	
Juozas Matulevičius	Nationwide	LLS	LF; LiCF (from 5 June 2003)	
Vitas Matuzas	26. Nevėžio	TSLK	TSLK	Until 12 March 2003
Alvydas Medalinskas	6. Šeškinės	LLS	LF	Until 25 February 2003
Nikolaj Medvedev	Nationwide	SDK	SDKF	
Artūras Melianas	Nationwide	LLS	LF; LiCF (from 5 June 2003)	
Gintautas Mikolaitis	42. Raseinių	LSDP	SDKF	
Dangutė Mikutienė	58. Trakų – Elektrėnų	NS	NSF	
Gabriel Jan Mincevič	55. Širvintų – Vilniaus	LLRA	MSNG; LDF (from 18 March 2003)	
Algirdas Monkevičius	39. Akmenės – Joniškio	NS	NSF	
Janė Narvilienė	36. Kretingos	ND	VNDPF; SDKF (from 27 May 2003)	
Saulius Nefas	Nationwide	TSLK	TSLK	From 29 June 2004
Visvaldas Nekrašas	35. Plungės – Rietavo	LSDP	SDKF	
Juozas Olekas	63. Suvalkijos	LSDP	SDKF	
Vladimiras Orechovas	Nationwide	SDK	SDKF	
Rolandas Paksas	3. Antakalnio	LLS	LF; LDF (from 1 July 2002)	Until 15 February 2003
Raimundas Palaitis	22. Pajūrio	LLS	LF; LiCF (from 5 June 2003)	
Juozas Palionis	67. Prienų	NS	NSF; SDKF (from 22 March 2004)	
Petras Papovas	52. Zarasų – Visagino	LDDP	SDKF	
Artūras Paulauskas	24. Saulės	NS	NSF	
Rolandas Pavilionis	Nationwide	NS	NSF	Until 1 July 2004
Artur Plokšto	Nationwide	SDK	SDKF	
Aleksander Poplavski	57. Vilniaus – Trakų	NS	NSF; LF (from 26 September 2001); LiCF (from 5 June 2003)	
Vasilijus Popovas	Nationwide	SDK	SDKF	
Mykolas Pronckus	Nationwide	SDK	SDKF	
Kazimira Prunskienė	54. Molėtų – Švenčionių	ND	VNDPF	
Alfonsas Pulokas	47. Pasvalio – Panevėžio	LDDP	SDKF	
Giedrė Purvaneckienė	Nationwide	SDK	SDKF	
Juozas Raistenskis	7. Justiniškių	LLS	LF; SDKF (from 12 January 2002)	Check
Alvydas Ramanauskas	Nationwide	NS	NSF	
Jurgis Razma	Nationwide	TSLK	TSLK	
Algis Rimas	Nationwide	SDK	SDKF	
Klemensas Rimšelis	13. Centro	LLS	LF; LiCF (from 5 June 2003)	
Viktoras Rinkevičius	48. Biržų – Kupiškio	LVP	VNDPF	
Rimantas Ruzas	Nationwide	SDK	SDKF	Until 14 October 2002
Julius Sabatauskas	Nationwide	SDK	SDKF	
Alvydas Sadeckas	Nationwide	NS	NSF	
Aloyzas Sakalas	Nationwide	SDK	SDKF	Until 1 July 2004
Algimantas Salamakinas	Nationwide	SDK	SDKF	
Algirdas Saudargas	12. Aleksoto – Vilijampolės	LKDP	MSNG	
Vytautas Saulis	50. Rokiškio	LDDP	SDKF	
Eimundas Savickas	17. Pramonės	LLS	LF; LDF (from 26 March 2003)	
Romanas Algimantas Sedlickas	Nationwide	LLS	LF; LiCF (from 5 June 2003)	
Valerijus Simulik	25. Dainų	NS	NSF	
Rimantas Sinkevičius	60. Jonavos	LDDP	SDKF	
Algirdas Sysas	Nationwide	SDK	SDKF	
Kęstutis Skamarakas	Nationwide	NS	NSF; LDF (from 16 March 2004)	
Egidijus Skarbalius	20. Baltijos	LLS	LF; LDF (from 1 July 2002)	
Artūras Skardžius	30. Alytaus	NS	NSF	
Vaclov Stankevič	Nationwide	NS	NSF	
Antanas Napoleonas Stasiškis	Nationwide	TSLK	TSLK	
Nijolė Steiblienė	Nationwide	NS	NSF	
Gintaras Steponavičius	9. Lazdynų	LLS	LF; LiCF (from 5 June 2003)	
Ilona Stulpinienė	Nationwide	NS	NSF	From 2 July 2004
Eduardas Šablinskas	Nationwide	NS	JF	
Irena Šiaulienė	Nationwide	SDK	SDKF	
Gintaras Šileikis	27. Vakarinė	LCS	LF; LiCF (from 5 June 2003)	
Gintautas Šivickas	65. Kauno – Kėdainių	NS	NSF	
Gražina Šmigelskienė	Nationwide	SDK	SDKF	From 23 June 2004
Raimondas Šukys	5. Fabijoniškių	LLS	LF; LiCF (from 5 June 2003)	
Vytautas Šustauskas	11. Šilainių	LS	MSNG	
Dalia Teišerskytė	Nationwide	LLS	LF; LiCF (from 5 June 2003)	
Valdemar Tomaševski	56. Vilniaus – Šalčininkų	LLRA	MSNG; LDF (from 29 April 2003)	
Valerij Tretjakov	Nationwide	NS	NSF	
Viktor Uspaskich	43. Kėdainių	Independent	MSNG	
Jurgis Utovka	Nationwide	SDK	SDKF	
Gediminas Vagnorius	40. Telšių	NKS	MSNG	
Rimas Valčiukas	Nationwide	NS	NSF	
Antanas Valys	Nationwide	SDK	SDKF	From 15 October 2002
Egidijus Vareikis	Nationwide	NS	NSF	
Rimvydas Vaštakas	Nationwide	LLS	LF; LiCF (from 5 June 2003)	Until 31 October 2003
Artūras Vazbys	Nationwide	LLS	JF; TSLK (from 13 March 2003)	
Domininkas Velička	Nationwide	LLS	LF; NSF (from 11 November 2003)	
Virmantas Velikonis	28. Aukštaitijos	LDDP	SDKF	
Birutė Vėsaitė	Nationwide	SDK	SDKF	
Julius Veselka	61. Ukmergės	Independent	MSNG; VNDPF (from 29 April 2003)	
Arvydas Vidžiūnas	Nationwide	TSLK	TSLK	Until 27 July 2004
Pranas Vilkas	Nationwide	LLS	LF; LDF (from 12 March 2003)	
Vytautas Zabiela	Nationwide	LLS	VNDPF	From 1 November 2003
Roma Žakaitienė	44. Radviliškio	LSDP	SDKF	
Vladas Žalnerauskas	66. Kauno kaimiškoji	LLS	LF; LDF (from 1 July 2002)	
Henrikas Žukauskas	14. Žaliakalnio	LLS	LF; LDF (from 1 July 2002)	
