= 2021 Homeland Union – Lithuanian Christian Democrats leadership election =

← 2017	28 February (27–28 March)	2025 →
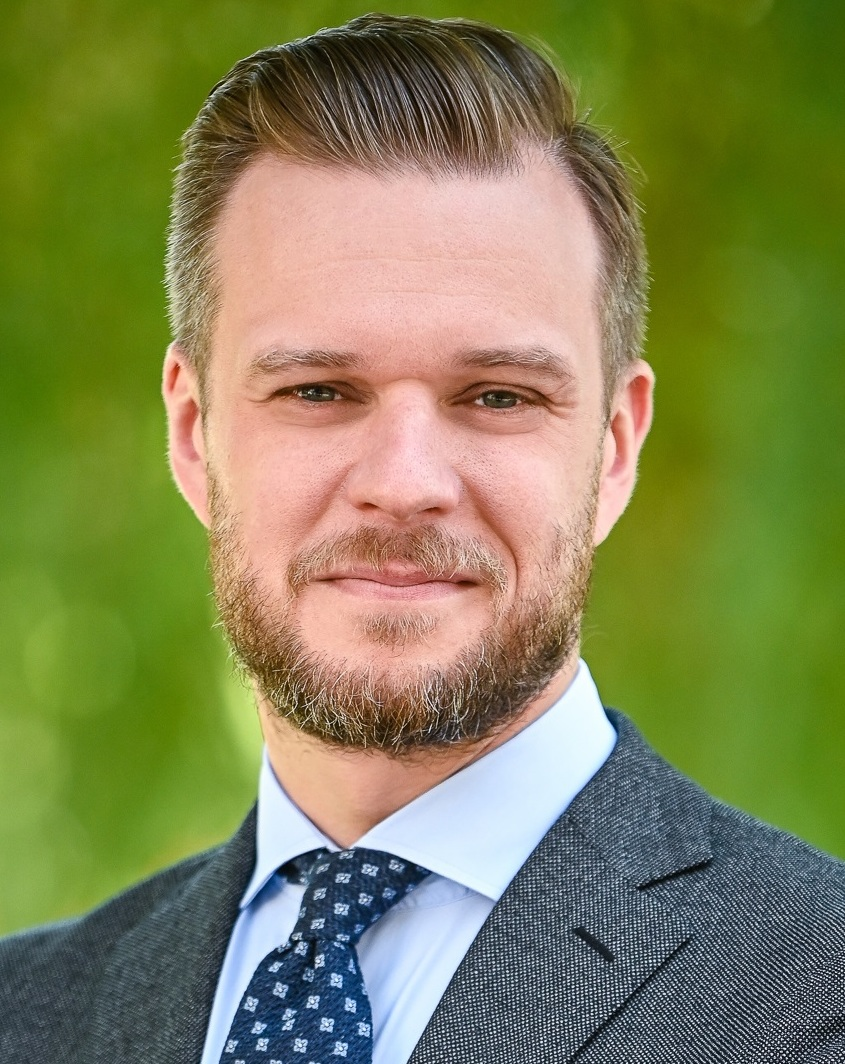
Nominee	Gabrielius Landsbergis
Popular vote	122
Percentage	94.57%
Leader before election
Gabrielius Landsbergis
Elected Leader
Gabrielius Landsbergis

The 2021 Homeland Union – Lithuanian Christian Democrats leadership election was planned to take place on 27–28 March 2021 to elect the leader of the Homeland Union - Lithuanian Christian Democrats.

For the first time, not only the members of the party would be able to vote. Those over the age of 16 and are citizens of the Republic of Lithuania, do not belong to other parties or election committees, and support the values of Homeland Union - Lithuanian Christian Democrats also would be able to register for the election.

On 26 February 2021, it was announced that the only candidate to participate in the leadership election will be the current party leader Gabrielius Landsbergis, others have refused in his favor and signed a general refusal to run in this election.

The party's council decided not to hold an election and to approve the candidate at a council meeting. On 28 February 2021, Gabrielius Landsbergis was approved as the leader for another four-year term.

== Candidates ==
According to the voting procedure, the candidates are nominated by the party's council, LKD, fractions, communities and departaments' meetings. The list of proposed candidates was announced on 23 February 2021.

On 26 February 2021, it was announced that the only candidate to participate in the leadership election will be the current party leader Gabrielius Landsbergis, others have refused in his favor and signed a general refusal to run in this election. They base such a decision on a special pandemic situation, which requires concentration and united work in the Seimas and the Government.

According to the procedure for the leadership election, in the event of a situation where only one candidate is present and approved, the decision on the further course of the election will be proposed by the party's Supervisory Committee and approved by the party's council.

=== Declared ===
Candidate	Political office
Gabrielius Landsbergis	Leader of Homeland Union - Lithuanian Christian Democrats (2015–present); Member of the European Parliament (2014–2016); Member of the Seimas (2016–present); Leader of Opposition (2020); Minister of Foreign Affairs (2020–present)

=== Proposed and withdrawn candidates ===
- Paulius Saudargas
- Laurynas Kasčiūnas
- Radvilė Morkūnaitė-Mikulėnienė
- Gintarė Skaistė
- Jurgita Šiugždinienė
- Žygimantas Pavilionis
- Arvydas Anušauskas
- Monika Navickienė
- Audronius Ažubalis
- Valdas Benkunskas
- Irena Degutienė
- Rasa Juknevičienė
- Mykolas Majauskas
- Kazys Starkevičius
- Šarūnas Vaitkus

== Results ==
The party's council decided not to hold an election and to approve the candidate at a council meeting. On 28 February 2021, Gabrielius Landsbergis was approved as the leader for another four-year term.

Candidate (party membership)	For		Against		Abstain	
Candidate (party membership)	Votes	%	Votes	%	Votes	%
Gabrielius Landsbergis	122	94.57	5	3.88	2	1.55
Source: lrt.lt
