= Pavilionis =

- Lithuanian surname
- m.: Pavilionis
- f.: (unmarried): Pavilionytė
- f.: (married): Pavilionienė

Pavilonis is a Lithuanian surname.

== People with the surname ==
- Rolandas Pavilionis (1944–2006), Lithuanian politician
- Žygimantas Pavilionis (born 1971), Lithuanian politician and diplomat
