= 2017 Homeland Union – Lithuanian Christian Democrats leadership election =

← 2015	11–12 February	2021 →
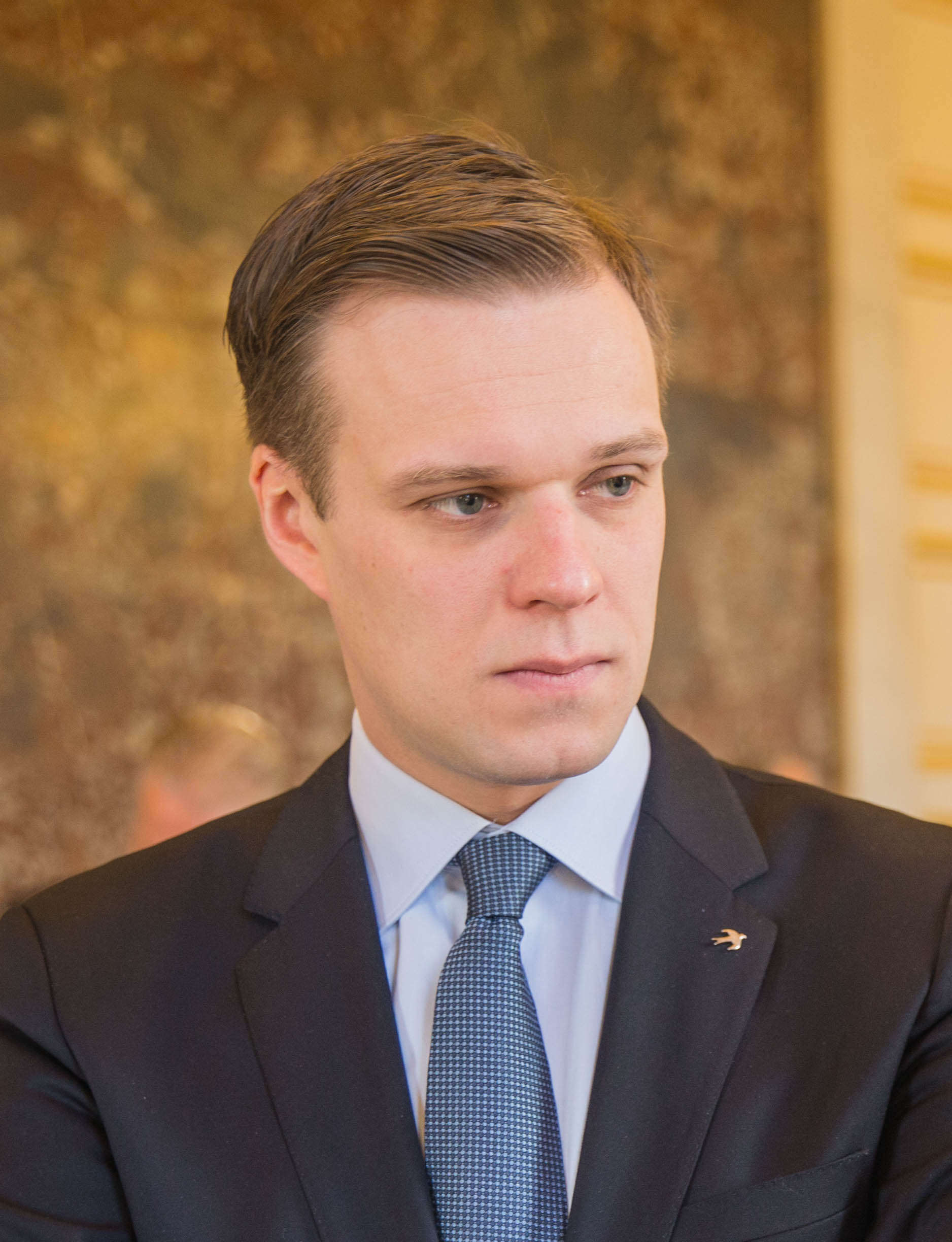

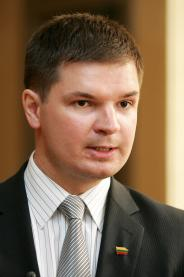

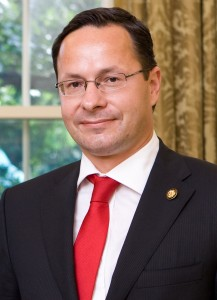

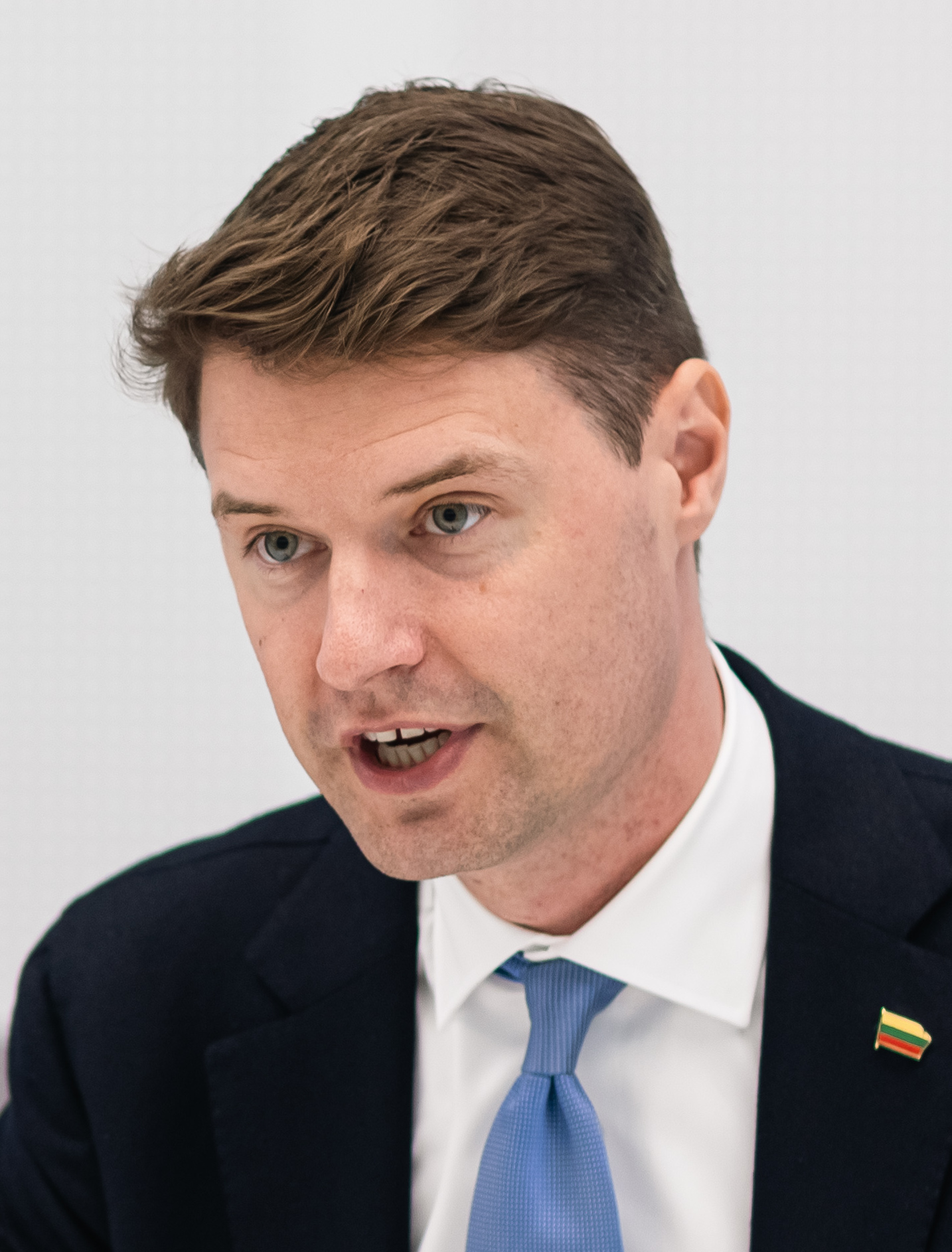
Nominee	Gabrielius Landsbergis	Paulius Saudargas
Popular vote	5,539	1,696
Percentage	62%	19%
Nominee	Žygimantas Pavilionis	Mykolas Majauskas
Popular vote	1,065	577
Percentage	12%	6%
Leader before election
Gabrielius Landsbergis
Elected Leader
Gabrielius Landsbergis

The 2017 Homeland Union – Lithuanian Christian Democrats leadership election took place on 11–12 February 2017 to elect the leader of the Homeland Union - Lithuanian Christian Democrats.

Gabrielius Landsbergis, leader of Homeland Union - Lithuanian Christian Democrats, asked to bring forward the election of the party leader, because he wanted to check the mandate of trust in the party after the 2016 Lithuanian parliamentary election.

The chairman of this party was elected for the first time for four years. Until this election, term has lasted two years.

== Candidates ==
The candidates were announced on 9 January 2017. Incumbent leader Gabrielius Landsbergis was able to run.

=== Declared ===
Candidate	Political office
Gabrielius Landsbergis	Leader of Homeland Union - Lithuanian Christian Democrats (2015–present); Member of the European Parliament (2014–2016); Member of the Seimas (2016–present)
Mykolas Majauskas	Shadow Minister of Finance (2013–2016); Vilnius City Councillor (2015–2016); Member of the Seimas (2016–present)
Žygimantas Pavilionis	Ambassador to the United States of America and Mexico (2010–2015); Member of the Seimas (2016–present)
Paulius Saudargas	Member of the Seimas (2008–present)

=== Withdrawn ===
- Agnė Bilotaitė, Member of the Seimas (2008–present)

== Results ==
Voting took place in 81 party's departments, 2 of them – abroad. Gabrielius Landsbergis was re-elected as party's leader.

Candidates (party membership)	First round	
Candidates (party membership)	Votes	%
Gabrielius Landsbergis	5,539	62
Paulius Saudargas	1,696	19
Žygimantas Pavilionis	1,065	12
Mykolas Majauskas	577	7
Total	8,987	100
Registered voters/turnout	15,540	57.83
Source: tsajunga.lt
