= Mykolaitis =

- Lithuanian surname
- m.: Mykolaitis
- f.: (unmarried): Mykolaitytė
- f.: (married): Mykolaitienė
- Origin: given name Mykolas
- Related names: Mikolaitis

Mykolaitis is a Lithuanian-language patronymic surname derived from the given name Mykolas (Michael). Notable people with the surname include:

- Povilas Mykolaitis (born 1983), Lithuanian long jumper
- Saulius Mykolaitis (1966 – 2006), Lithuanian director, actor, and singer-songwriter
- Vincas Mykolaitis (1893–1967), Lithuanian poet and writer
- Solveiga Mykolaitytė, Lithuanian film actress and model
