= Lydeka =

- Lithuanian surname
- m.: Lydeka
- f.: (unmarried): Lydekaitė
- f.: (married): Lydekienė
- Origin: lydeka, "pike"

Lydeka is a Lithuanian surname literally meaning "pike". Notable people with the surname include:

- Arminas Lydeka (born 1968), Lithuanian politician
- Tautvydas Lydeka (born 1983), Lithuanian basketball player
- Zigmas Lydeka (born 1954), Lithuanian economist and professor, former rector of the Vytautas Magnus University
