= 2025 Homeland Union – Lithuanian Christian Democrats leadership election =

← 2021	9 February 2025	2029 →
- Turnout: ▲17 018
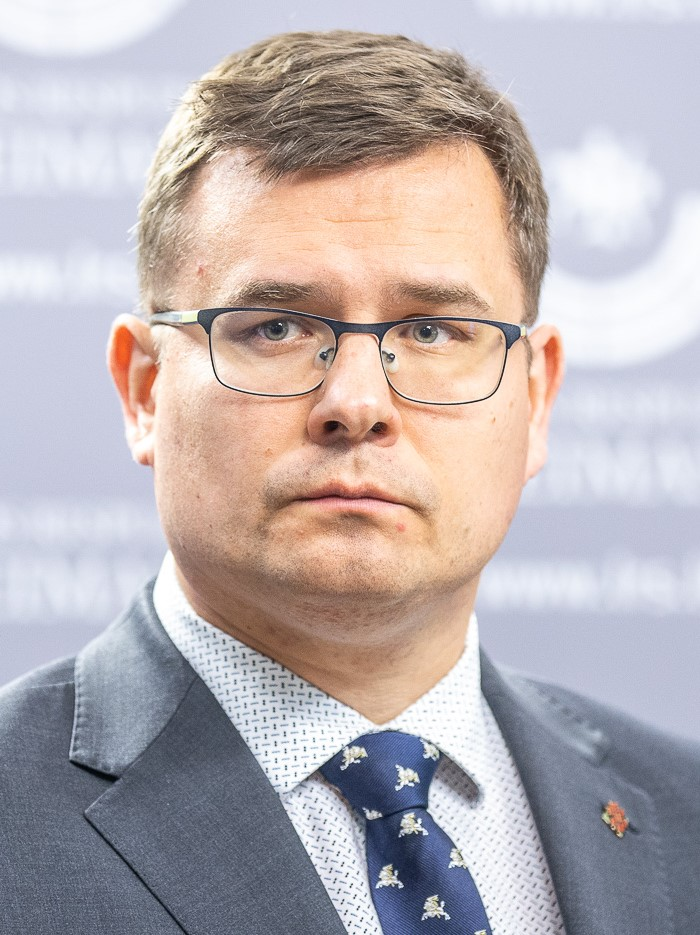

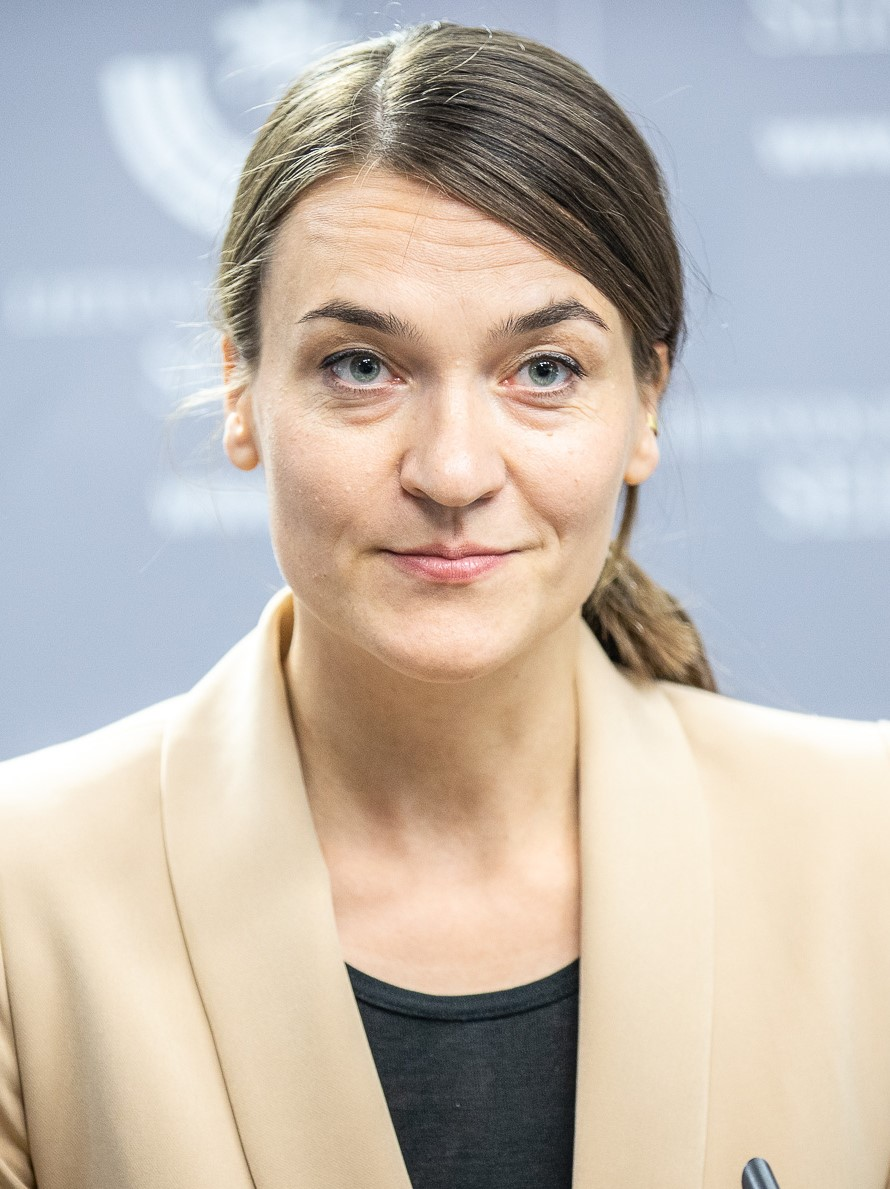

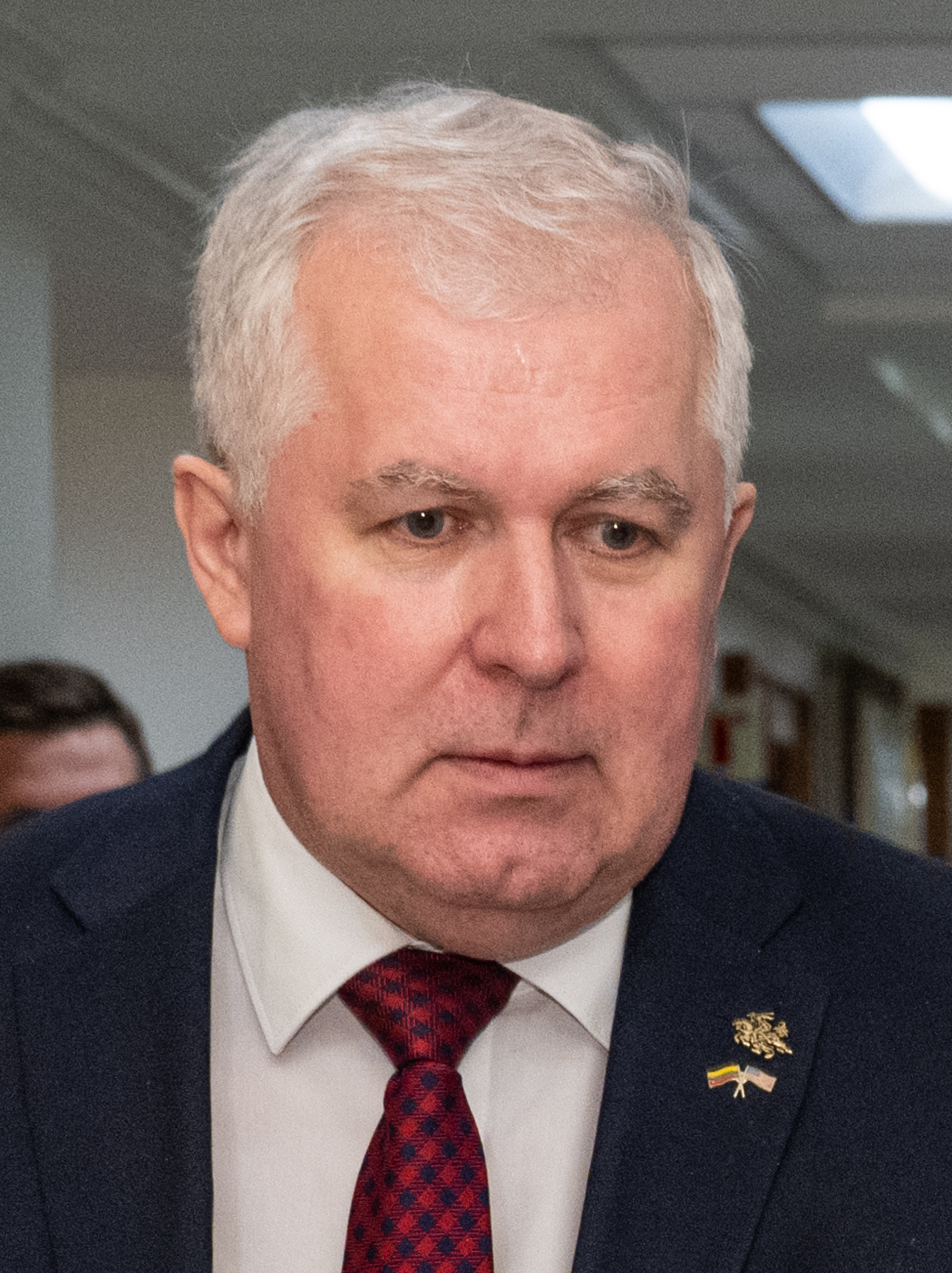

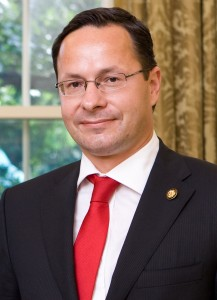
Candidate	Laurynas Kasčiūnas	Radvilė Morkūnaitė-Mikulėnienė	Arvydas Anušauskas
Popular vote	13 488	2942	392
Percentage	79.3%	17.3%	2.3%
Candidate	Žygimantas Pavilionis	Daivaras Rybakovas
Popular vote	298	59
Percentage	▼1.75%	0.35%
Chairwoman before election
Radvilė Morkūnaitė-Mikulėnienė
Elected Chairman
Laurynas Kasčiūnas

The 2025 Homeland Union – Lithuanian Christian Democrats leadership election was held on 9 February 2025 to elect a new chairperson of the Homeland Union - Lithuanian Christian Democrats.

Ingrida Šimonytė, the former Prime Minister of Lithuania, officially announced on 23 December 2024, that she will not be running for leader.

In late December 2024, it became clear who the candidates were: Arvydas Anušauskas, Daivaras Rybakovas, Laurynas Kasčiūnas, Radvilė Morkūnaitė-Mikulėnienė, and Žygimantas Pavilionis.

== Candidates ==
=== Declared ===
Candidate	Political office
Laurynas Kasčiūnas	Minister of National Defence (25 March 2024 – 11 December 2024); Member of the Seimas (present)
Radvilė Morkūnaitė-Mikulėnienė	Minister of Education, Science and Sports (27 June 2024 – 14 November 2024); Member of the European Parliament (14 July 2009 – 30 June 2014); Member of the Seimas (present)
Arvydas Anušauskas	Minister of National Defence (11 December 2020 – 25 March 2024); Member of Seimas (present)
Žygimantas Pavilionis	Member of the Seimas (present)
Daivaras Rybakovas	Advisor to the Minister of Agriculture (until August)

== Results ==
Laurynas Kasčiūnas was elected chairman of the Homeland Union – Lithuanian Christian Democrats (TS-LKD), securing nearly 80% of the vote.
