= Vincė Vaidevutė Margevičienė =

Lithuanian politician

Member of the Seimas
- In office 15 November 2004 – 14 November 2016
- Preceded by: Klemensas Rimšelis
- Succeeded by: Post abolished
- Constituency: Centras constituency

Vice chairwoman of the Homeland Union
- In office 25 April 2015 – 4 March 2017

Personal details
- Born: 12 May 1949 (age 77) Irkutsk Oblast, Russia
- Party: Lithuanian Union of Political Prisoners and Deportees (1990-2003); Homeland Union (2003-present)
- Spouse: Edmundas Margevičius
- Education: Vilnius University; Kaunas University of Technology

Vincė Vaidevutė Margevičienė (born 12 May 1949) is a Lithuanian biologist, political prisoner, politician and a former member of the Seimas. She was designated as the vice chairwoman of the Homeland Union in 2015.

Seimas
Preceded by Klemensas Rimšelis	Member of the Seimas for Centras; 2004–2016	Succeeded by Gabrielius Landsbergis (Centras-Žaliakalnis)
