= Janė Narvilienė =

Lithuanian politician (1945–2022)

Member of the Seimas
- In office 2000–2004

Personal details
- Born: 20 September 1945 Ignalina District Municipality, Lithuanian SSR, Soviet Union
- Died: 3 February 2022 (aged 76) Kretinga, Lithuania
- Party: NDP; LSDP
- Education: Vilnius Pedagogical Institute

Janė Narvilienė (20 September 1945 – 3 February 2022) was a Lithuanian politician. A member of the Social Democratic Party of Lithuania, she served in the Seimas from 2000 to 2004. She died in Kretinga on 3 February 2022, at the age of 76.
