= Gabrielius Landsbergis =

Lithuanian politician (born 1982)

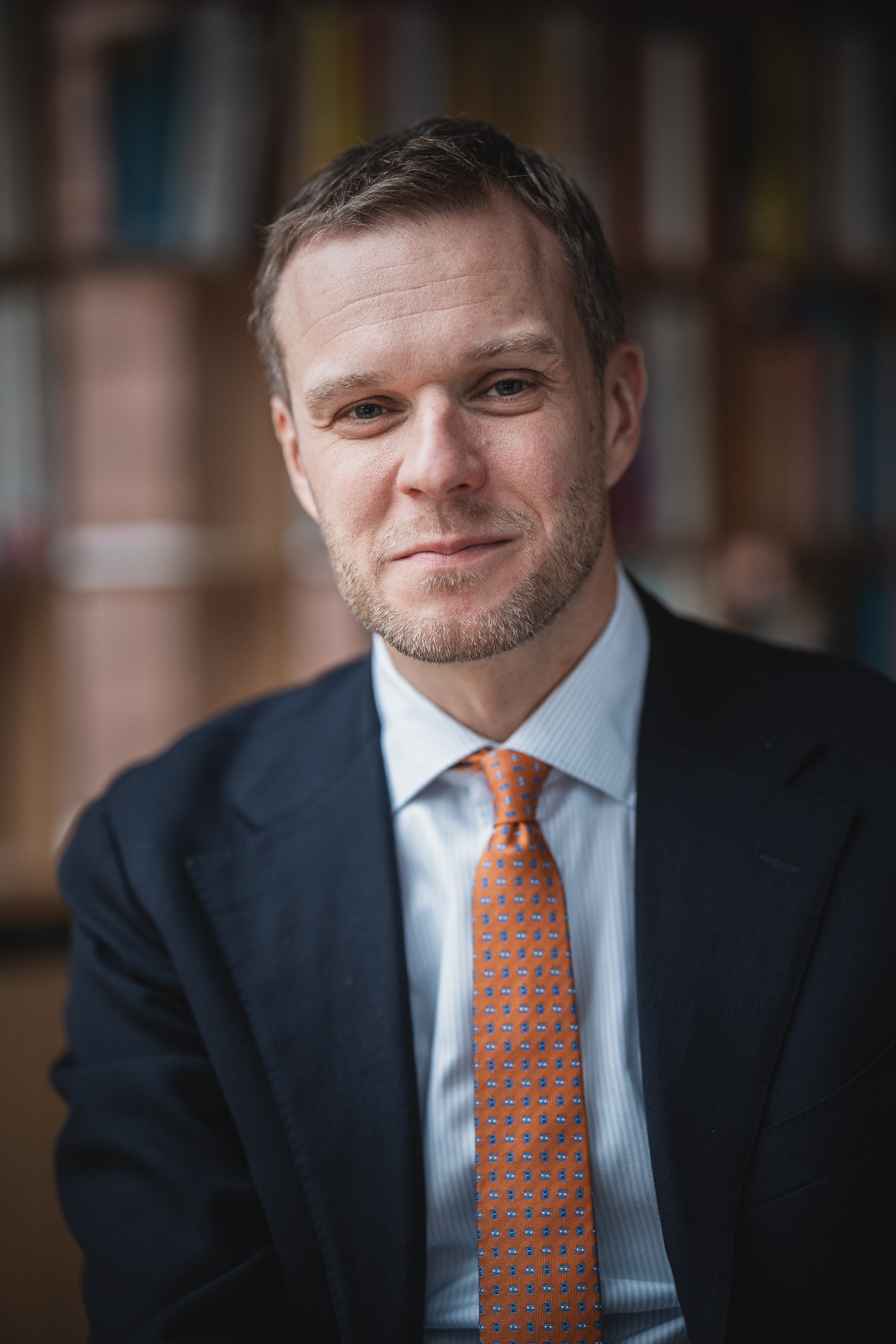
- Official portrait, 2024

Minister for Foreign Affairs
- In office 11 December 2020 – 11 December 2024
- Prime Minister: Ingrida Šimonytė
- Preceded by: Linas Linkevičius
- Succeeded by: Kęstutis Budrys

President of the Committee of Ministers of the Council of Europe
- In office 17 May 2024 – 13 November 2024
- Preceded by: Dominique Hasler
- Succeeded by: Xavier Bettel

Member of Seimas
- In office 14 November 2016 – 14 November 2024
- Preceded by: Rasa Juknevičienė (Žaliakalnis); Vincė Vaidevutė Margevičienė (Centras)
- Succeeded by: Simonas Kairys
- Constituency: Centras – Žaliakalnis

Chairman of the Homeland Union
- In office 25 April 2015 – 28 October 2024
- Preceded by: Andrius Kubilius
- Succeeded by: Laurynas Kasčiūnas; Radvilė Morkūnaitė-Mikulėnienė (acting)

Leader of the Opposition (Lithuania)
- In office 10 March 2020 – 12 November 2020
- Preceded by: Julius Sabatauskas
- Succeeded by: Saulius Skvernelis (2021)

Member of the European Parliament for Lithuania
- In office 1 July 2014 – 12 May 2016
- Succeeded by: Laima Liucija Andrikienė

Personal details
- Born: 7 January 1982 (age 44) Vilnius, Lithuanian SSR, Soviet Union
- Party: Homeland Union
- Spouse: Austėja Landsbergienė
- Relations: Vytautas Landsbergis (grandfather)
- Children: 4
- Education: Vilnius University

Gabrielius Landsbergis (born 7 January 1982) is a Lithuanian politician and diplomat who served as Lithuania's Minister of Foreign Affairs from December 2020 until November 2024 in the Šimonytė Cabinet. A key figure in Lithuanian politics, Landsbergis previously served as a Member of the Seimas from 2016 to 2024, representing the Centras–Žaliakalnis constituency. He is also a former Member of the European Parliament (2014–2016), where he represented Lithuania as part of the Group of the European People's Party (Christian Democrats). During his tenure in the European Parliament, Landsbergis served on the Committee on International Trade and the Subcommittee on Security and Defence, focusing on global trade and defense policy.

Since 2015, Landsbergis has been Chairman of the Homeland Union (Lithuanian Christian Democrats), Lithuania's center-right political party. Under his leadership, the Homeland Union became a leading force in Lithuanian politics. After the party's second-place finish in the 2024 Lithuanian parliamentary election, Landsbergis stepped down as chairman and declined a proportional-list seat in the Seimas, stating his intention to take a break from politics.

As Minister of Foreign Affairs, Landsbergis was a vocal advocate for European integration, NATO solidarity, and democratic values. His tenure was defined by Lithuania's strong support for Ukraine during the Russian invasion of Ukraine, as well as efforts to counter Russian influence in the region. Landsbergis emphasized Lithuania's role in fostering stronger ties between the European Union and global democracies, alongside efforts to diversify Lithuania's economic partnerships and reduce reliance on authoritarian regimes.

== Early life and education ==
Gabrielius Landsbergis was born in Vilnius on 7 January 1982. His grandfather, Vytautas Landsbergis, became a prominent politician in 1988.

He earned a bachelor's degree from the Faculty of History at Vilnius University in 2003. In 2005, he completed a master's degree in International Relations at the Vilnius University Institute of International Relations and Political Science.

== Career ==
Gabrielius Landsbergis began his career at the Ministry of Foreign Affairs of Lithuania and the President's Chancellery. In 2007, he joined the staff of the Lithuanian embassy in the Kingdom of Belgium and the Grand Duchy of Luxembourg, focusing on bilateral relations and diplomatic outreach.

After returning to Lithuania in 2011, he worked at the Chancellery of the Government of Lithuania, contributing to policy analysis and administrative coordination. Landsbergis is a native Lithuanian speaker and is fluent in English.

=== MEP, MP, Minister of Foreign Affairs ===
In January 2014, Landsbergis was selected as the leading candidate for the Homeland Union's list in the 2014 European Parliament election. He was elected as a Member of the European Parliament (MEP), serving from 2014 to 2016.

During his time in the European Parliament, Landsbergis served on the Committee on International Trade and the Subcommittee on Security and Defence. He was also a member of the European Parliament Intergroup on Children's Rights.

In April 2015, Landsbergis was elected Chairman of the Homeland Union, defeating former Speaker of the Seimas Irena Degutienė. He was reelected in 2017 and again in 2021, the latter time unopposed after other nominees withdrew.

In November 2015, Landsbergis announced his candidacy for the Žaliakalnis single-member constituency in the 2016 Lithuanian parliamentary election. After constituency borders were redrawn, he ran in the newly established Centras–Žaliakalnis constituency. He resigned from the European Parliament in March 2016 and was the only Homeland Union candidate to win a single-member constituency in Kaunas.

As Minister of Foreign Affairs from 2020, Gabrielius Landsbergis focused on strengthening Lithuania's strategic partnerships with the United States, NATO, and Taiwan. He prioritized collective security, democratic values, and unity among allies to counter regional threats, including Russian aggression, while providing steadfast support for Ukraine.

In late 2023, Landsbergis was ranked among Lithuanian public figures trusted by 1.8% of respondents in a public opinion poll. Following the 2024 Lithuanian parliamentary election, during which Landsbergis lost his single-member constituency, he resigned as party chair and declined a proportional-list seat, stating his intention to take a break from politics.

Landsbergis is a member of the European Council on Foreign Relations, a think tank.

== Policies while minister ==
=== NATO and Regional Security ===
As Minister of Foreign Affairs, Landsbergis prioritized strengthening regional security through cooperation with NATO and the European Union. In response to Russian aggression, he urged NATO to establish clear red lines to counter hybrid warfare tactics, including disinformation campaigns and energy security threats.

Landsbergis also advocated for increased support for Ukraine during the Russian invasion of Ukraine, emphasizing the need for greater military aid and stronger sanctions against Russia. He worked to unify EU member states in addressing these challenges, underscoring Lithuania's commitment to collective defense and democratic resilience.

=== Taiwan ===
In June 2020, Gabrielius Landsbergis, together with his future deputy minister Mantas Adomėnas, outlined a proposed foreign policy approach towards China in an article advocating for greater alignment with democratic values and reduced reliance on authoritarian regimes.

This policy was implemented with the opening of a Taiwanese trade office in Lithuania, marking a shift from the conventional "Taipei" naming to "Taiwanese," which played on linguistic nuances in Lithuanian. The decision sparked diplomatic tensions, resulting in the closure of the Chinese embassy in Vilnius and Lithuania's embassy in Beijing.

Economic expectations did not fully materialize. Taiwanese investments totaled approximately €16.2 million across three Lithuanian startups, with some funding involving co-investment rather than direct financing. Additional cooperation included a €10 million technology transfer agreement with Teltonika, aimed at bolstering Lithuania's tech sector. However, bilateral trade between Lithuania and Taiwan showed signs of stagnation during the same period.

Lithuania also secured a $600 million financing agreement with the Export–Import Bank of the United States to support U.S. exports to Lithuania. Additionally, Taiwan's Export–Import Bank extended an €8 million credit line to Solitek, a Lithuanian solar company.

Public opinion on the policy was divided. A 2021 poll, funded by the Foreign Ministry, found that only 13% of Lithuanians supported the government's approach toward China and Taiwan.

== Family ==
Gabrielius Landsbergis is married to Austėja Landsbergienė (née Čijauskaitė). The couple has four children.

In February 2022, six days before the Russian invasion of Ukraine, Austėja Landsbergienė purchased a villa on the island of Aegina, Greece, for €795,000. The purchase raised questions about its timing, though the family did not provide further details. In July 2024, Lithuania began drafting evacuation plans for citizens in case of war.

Landsbergis is among the wealthiest members of the 2016–2020 Seimas, with an estimated net worth of €19.9 million. Much of this wealth is attributed to his wife's chain of private schools and kindergartens, some of which receive public funding. The State Tax Inspectorate initiated an investigation into a company linked to Austėja Landsbergienė following the release of public declarations.

Gabrielius Landsbergis' father, Vytautas V. Landsbergis, is a Lithuanian writer, and his mother, Giedrė Bukelytė, is a psychologist. He is the grandson of Vytautas Landsbergis, a key figure in Lithuania's independence movement, former Chairman of the Reconstituent Seimas, and a founder of Sąjūdis.

His great-grandfather, Vytautas Landsbergis-Žemkalnis, was a prominent architect and political figure. Despite controversial ties during occupations by the Soviets and Nazis, he held various high-ranking positions, including Minister in the Provisional Government of Lithuania in 1941. His wife, Ona Jablonskytė-Landsbergienė, was the daughter of linguist Jonas Jablonskis, who standardized the Lithuanian language. During the Nazi occupation, Ona saved a Jewish girl, earning her recognition as a Righteous Among the Nations.

During a state visit to Israel in 2023, Landsbergis paid tribute to his great-grandmother at Yad Vashem's Garden of the Righteous Among the Nations.

The Landsbergis family name is of German origin, with ancestral ties to estate management for a noble family.

== Honors ==
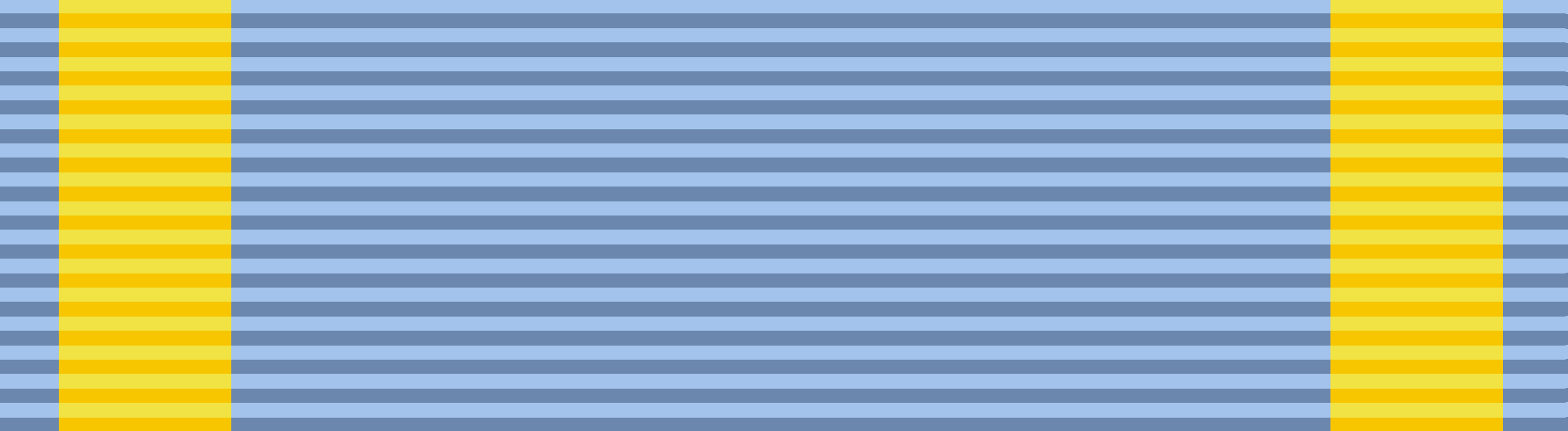
- Order of Prince Yaroslav the Wise, 3rd class (Ukraine, 23 August 2022)
- Order of Brilliant Star with Grand Cordon, Taiwan, 14 January 2025)

Seimas
Preceded by Vincė Vaidevutė Margevičienė (Centras); Rasa Juknevičienė (Žaliakalnis)	Member of the Seimas for Centras and Žaliakalnis; 2016–present	Incumbent
Political offices
Preceded by Linas Antanas Linkevičius	Minister of Foreign Affairs; 2020–present	Incumbent
