= Naujamiestis, Vilnius =

Naujamiestis
- Eldership
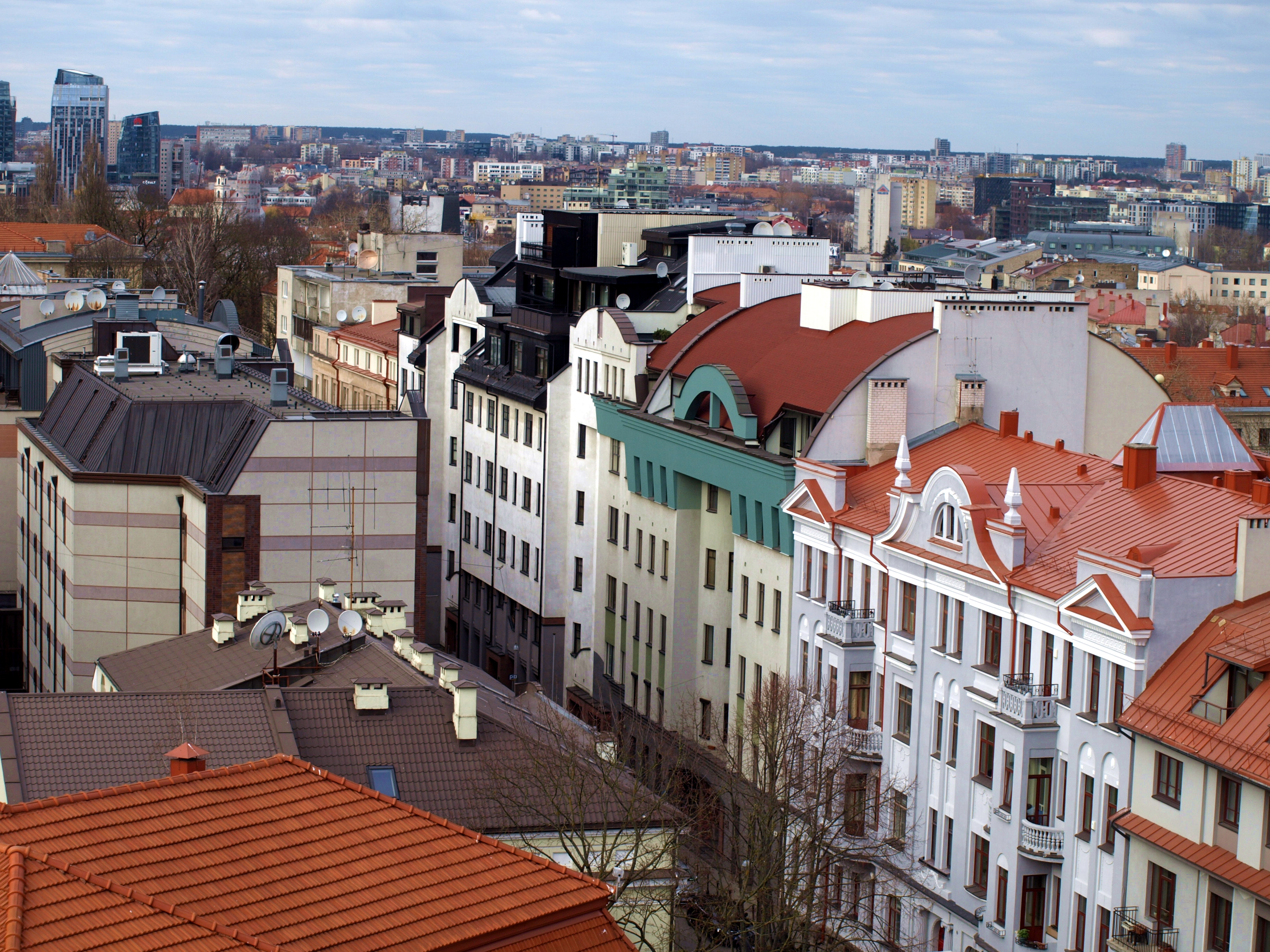
- Luxurious apartment buildings, built in the late 1990s in Naujamiestis offer panoramic views of the Old Town

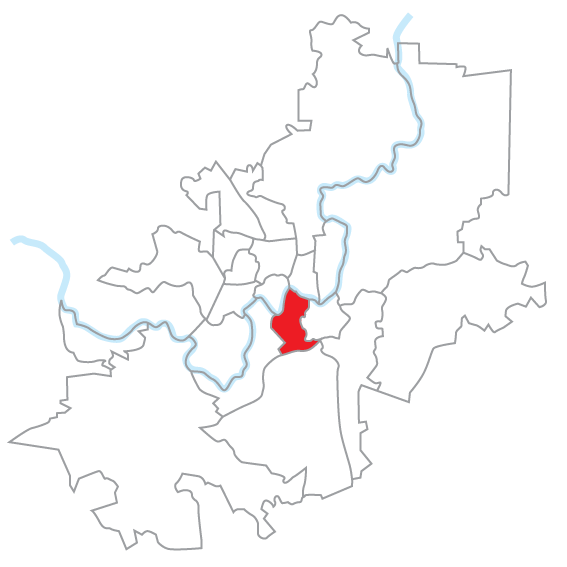

- Location within Lithuania
- Country: Lithuania
- County: Vilnius County
- Municipality: Vilnius city municipality

Area
  - Total: 4.9 km^{2} (1.9 sq mi)

Population (2021)
  - Total: 34,668
  - Density: 7,100/km^{2} (18,000/sq mi)
- Time zone: UTC+2 (EET)
  - Summer (DST): UTC+3 (EEST)

Naujamiestis (in English branding often referred to as Uptown) is an eldership in the Vilnius city municipality, Lithuania. It occupies 4.9 km². According to the 2021 census, it had a population of 28,157, giving it a population density of 5,745 people per square kilometer.

== Tourist attractions, theatres, and museums ==
- Lithuanian National Opera and Ballet Theatre
- The Opera and Ballet Theater Fountains
- Opera Park
- Vytautas Kasiulis Art Museum
- Beatričė Grincevičiūtė House Museum
- State Small Theatre of Vilnius
- Lukiškės Square
- Interactive Fountains
- Museum of Occupations and Freedom Fights
- The Green House
- The Venclova house-museum
- Aurochs Mountain
- Marriage Palace Park
- Old Theatre of Vilnius
- Helios City Building and Mall

== Transportation ==
- Vilnius railway station
- European route E272
