= Giedrė Purvaneckienė =

Lithuanian physicist and university teacher

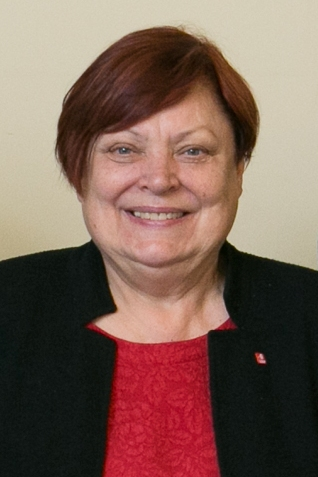
- Purvaneckienė in 2015, by Ernests Dinka
- Born: Giedrė Vazalinskaitė; 8 March 1945 (age 81); Kaunas, Lithuanian Soviet Socialist Republic
- Occupations: academic, politician, women's rights activist
- Years active: 1968-present
- Known for: Co-founding the first women's studies center in Lithuania

Giedrė Purvaneckienė (born 1945) is a Lithuanian politician and academic. She was one of the founders and initial instructors of the Women's Studies Centre in Vilnius. She served as the state advisor on women, children, and the family from 1994 to 2000 to the government of Lithuania and the United Nations Development Program. She was a member of the Seimas between 2001 and 2004 and 2012 to 2016. Purvaneckienė led the Lithuanian delegation of the Baltic Assembly between 2004 and 2005, before becoming president of the Assembly in 2015.

== Early life and education ==
Giedrė Vazalinskaitė was born on 8 March 1945 in Kaunas, Lithuanian Soviet Socialist Republic to Vytautas Vazalinskas, a Lithuanian agronomist who was responsible for establishing agricultural testing stations and agrarian institutes throughout the country and served in the Supreme Soviet of the Lithuanian Soviet Socialist Republic from 1955 until his death in 1984. Vazalinskaitė was very close to her father as a child and remembered him as teaching she and her siblings how to ride a bicycle, skate and swim. He was a polyglot and also played the guitar. After graduating from Vilnius Salomėja Nėris Secondary School in 1963, she attended Vilnius University becoming a semiconductor physicist in 1968. After her graduation, in 1969, she married Raimundas Purvaneckas.

== Career ==
=== Academia ===
Between 1968 and 1973, Purvaneckienė worked as a junior research fellow for the Lithuanian Academy of Sciences. The following year, she became a laboratory assistant at Vilnius University, and was promoted in 1975 to head the teaching laboratory of their Institute of Semiconductors. In 1982, she earned her candidate's degree in pedagogy from Vilnius University. Purvaneckienė was a research associate from 1986 through 1991 in the social sciences faculty. Simultaneously she taught as a senior lecturer between 1989 and 1994 and headed the department from 1991 to 1994. Purvaneckienė has completed several internships abroad, including at the University of Oslo in 1993, at the University of Minnesota in 1995, and at the University of Gothenburg in 1996. She became an associate professor at Vilnius University in 1995. That year, she became one of the founders and first instructors at the Women's Studies Centre in Vilnius.

== Politics ==
Purvaneckienė was active in the women's movement in Lithuania throughout the 1990s and was led through her activism into politics. She served as the state advisor on women, children, and family matters between 1994 and 1997. During that time, she participated in the Fourth World Conference on Women held in Beijing, China in 1995. From 1997 to 2000, she was an advisor on gender to the United Nations Development Program and published handbooks on women for the organization. In 1998, she joined the Social Democratic Party of Lithuania and the following year became vice chair of the party's women's caucus. The women's caucus worked to secure passage of the law on Equal Opportunities of Men and Women and national implementation plans for equality.

In 2000, Purvaneckienė was elected as a member of the Seimas, Lithuania's parliament. She served as chair of the Family and Child Affairs Commission between 2001 and 2004 and in the latter year was appointed to lead the country's delegation to the Baltic Assembly. Her term in politics ended in 2004 and she returned to teaching, until she was re-elected to the Seimas in 2012. In 2015, when Lithuania took over the presidency of the Baltic Assembly, she became President of the assembly.

== Research and selected works ==
Purvaneckienė has published over sixty academic works. Many of her works had to do with policies about education, women and family issues, such as the discrimination faced by working women.

- Purvaneckienė, Giedrė (1995). Women in Lithuanian Society: Project Report. Vilnius: United Nations Development Programme. ISBN 978-9986-442-28-8.
- Purvaneckienė, Giedrė (1998). Gender in Development: Handbook for CEE and Baltic Countries. Vilnius: United Nations Development Programme, Regional Bureau for Europe and the CIS, Regional Support Center. ISBN 978-9986-639-10-7.
- Bulajeva, Tatjana; Duoblienė, Lilija; Aramavičiūtė, Vanda; Būdienė, Virginija; Čiužaitė, Giedrė; Leišytė, Liudvika; Kaminskas, Kęstutis; Purvaneckienė, Giedrė (2009). Lietuvos švietimo politikos transformacijos: monografija [Monographs on the Transformation of Lithuanian Education Policy] (in Lithuanian). Vilnius: Vilniaus universiteto leidykla. ISBN 978-9955-33-518-4.
- Novelskaitė, Aurelija; Purvaneckienė, Giedrė, eds. (2011). Moteris: fiziniuose ir technologijos moksluose: mokinė, studentė, mokslininkė [Women in Physical and Technological Sciences: Pupil, Student, Researcher] (in Lithuanian). Vilnius: Vilniaus universiteto leidykla. ISBN 978-9955-33-638-9.
