= Gintautas Mikolaitis =

Lithuanian politician (born 1959)

Gintautas Mikolaitis (born December 19, 1959) is a Lithuanian engineer and politician, member of the Seimas (Lithuanian parliament) during the 2000–2004, 2004–2008 and 2012–2016 convocations representing the Social Democratic Party of Lithuania.

He was born in the village of Liepynai, Raseiniai District to a peasant family. In 1984, he graduated from the Kaunas Polytechnic Institute with a specialty of mechanical engineering of light industry.
