= Marija Aušrinė Pavilionienė =

Lithuanian politician

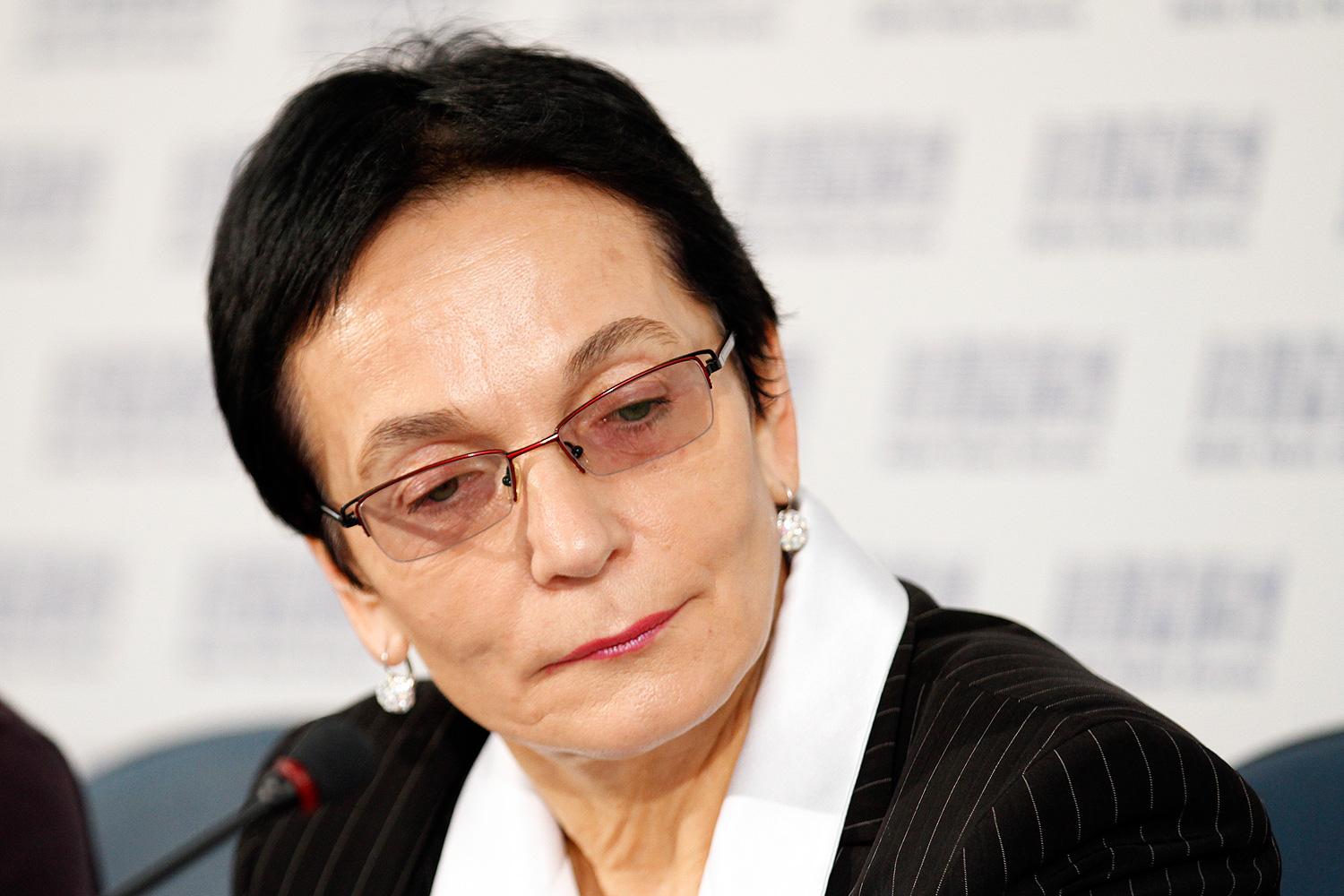

Member of the Seimas
- In office 7 July 2009 – 14 November 2016
- Preceded by: Vilija Blinkevičiūtė
- In office 15 November 2004 – 17 November 2008

Personal details
- Born: Marija Aušrinė; 6 April 1944 (age 82) Kaunas, Lithuania
- Party: Liberal Democratic Party (2004-2008); Social Democratic Party of Lithuania (2008-2017)
- Spouse: Rolandas Pavilionis (died 2006)
- Children: 2 (Šarūnas, Žygimantas)
- Parents: Vladas Fedotas-Sipavičius, Sipaitis (father); Jadvyga Ramanauskaitė (mother)
- Education: Vilnius University

Marija Aušrinė Pavilionienė (née Aušrinė; born 6 April 1944) is a Lithuanian philologist, professor, human rights activist, feminist writer and politician. She was a member of Seimas from 2009 to 2016 as a member of the Social Democratic Party, having previously represented the Liberal Democratic Party as a member from 2004 to 2008.

Marija Aušrinė was born in Kaunas to a family of actors, including Vladas Fedotas-Sipavičius and Jadvyga Ramanauskaitė. She graduated from the 23rd Vilnius School. In 1967, she graduated from Vilnius State University, continuing her studies in American literature problems. In 1977, she completed a PhD in philology from Taras Shevchenko National University of Kyiv.

Her husband Rolandas Pavilionis was a Member of the European Parliament and had been a dean of Vilnius University from 1990 to 2000. The two have two sons, one of whom is an ambassador to the United States.

== Political activism and scientific work ==
Marija Aušrinė Pavilionienė is one of the most well-known LGBT rights activists in Lithuania, and the chairman of ad hoc Group of Seimas Members for Equality. She is also a prominent feminist thinker and occasionally publishes articles about gender issues.

Pavilionienė was a member of the Groups of Seimas concerning human rights in Tibet and Belarus during her first term in Seimas.

== Bibliography ==
- The Universal Literature of the 20th century. (XX amžiaus visuotinė literatūra). Kaunas: Šviesa, 1992;
- Western Literature of the 20th century. (XX a. Vakarų literatūra) Vilnius: Vilnius University, 1994–1995;
- Feminism and Literature (Feminizmas ir literatūra). Vilnius: Vilnius University, 1996;
- The Drama of Genders (Lyčių drama). Vilnius: Vilnius University, 1998;
- Romanticism in Western Literature (Romantizmas Vakarų literatūroje). Vilnius: Vilnius University, 2000;
- The Performances of Life and Theatre: Western Drama of the 20th Century (Gyvenimo ir teatro vaidinimai: XX amžiaus Vakarų drama). Vilnius: Charibdė, 2004;
- Expectancies and Disappointment (Viltys ir nusivylimai). 2011
