= Dalia Teišerskytė =

Lithuanian journalist and politician (1944–2023)

Member of the Seimas
- In office 19 October 2000 – 10 November 2016

Personal details
- Born: 27 November 1944 Leonava, Šiluvos County, Lithuanian SSR, USSR (now Lithuania)
- Died: 27 November 2023 (aged 79) Kaunas, Lithuania
- Party: LMP (1995–1999); LLS (1999–2003); LS
- Education: Vilnius University
- Occupation: Journalist

Dalia Teišerskytė (27 November 1944 – 27 November 2023) was a Lithuanian journalist and politician. A member of the Liberal Union of Lithuania and later the Liberals' Movement, she served in the Seimas from 2000 to 2016.

Teišerskytė died in Kaunas on 27 November 2023, her 79th birthday.
