= Birutė Vėsaitė =

Lithuanian politician

Member of the Seimas
- Incumbent
- Assumed office 14 November 2024
- Constituency: Multi-member
- In office 19 October 2000 – 14 November 2016
- Constituency: Multi-member

Personal details
- Born: 19 August 1951 (age 75) Kaunas
- Party: Lithuanian Social Democratic Party

Birutė Vėsaitė (born 19 August 1951) is a Lithuanian politician and a member of the Lithuanian Social Democratic Party. She has served in the Seimas since November 2024, having previously been a member from 2000 to 2016. She was Lithuania's minister of economy in Algirdas Butkevičius's government from December 2012 to June 2013. She also served briefly as a Member of the European Parliament in 2004.

== Life ==
Vėsaitė was born in Kaunas on 19 August 1951. She graduated from the Kaunas Polytechnic Institute, now Kaunas University of Technology, in 1974 with a qualification in chemical technology. She also studied English language and literature at Vilnius University and undertook postgraduate studies at the Leningrad Institute of Textile and Light Industry, receiving a doctorate in technical sciences.

From 1974 to 1984, she worked as an engineer at the Kaunas artificial fibre factory. She subsequently joined the Lithuanian Veterinary Academy, becoming an associate professor in its chemistry department in 1990 and teaching biochemistry and clinical chemistry.

== Political career ==
Vėsaitė joined the Lithuanian Social Democratic Party in 1991 and served on the Kaunas City Municipal Council from 1997 to 2000. She was first elected to the Seimas in 2000. She served four consecutive parliamentary terms until 2016. During the 2004–2008 term, she chaired the Seimas Committee on Economics.

She was an observer at the European Parliament from April 2003 to April 2004 and became a member following Lithuania's accession to the European Union. Her parliamentary term ran from 1 May to 19 July 2004. She belonged to the Group of the Party of European Socialists and served on the Committee on Industry, External Trade, Research and Energy.

In December 2012, Vėsaitė became minister of economy in the government of Algirdas Butkevičius. In May 2013, she faced criticism after travelling to a business forum in Kazakhstan on an aircraft chartered by the Lithuanian company Arvi. On 29 May, President Dalia Grybauskaitė signed a decree dismissing her at the prime minister's request. The decree took effect on 3 June, with Justice Minister Juozas Bernatonis assuming the economy portfolio on an acting basis.

On 26 June 2013, the Seimas Ethics and Procedures Commission concluded that Vėsaitė had not violated conflict-of-interest rules in connection with the flight.

From 2016 to 2024, she worked as an assistant to a member of the Seimas. She returned to parliament on 14 November 2024 after being elected on the Social Democratic Party's list. As the oldest member of the newly elected parliament, she presided over its opening sitting.
