= Egidijus Klumbys =

Lithuanian politician (born 1952

Egidijus Klumbys (born 2 September 1952 in Kaunas) is a Lithuanian politician. In 1990 he was among those who signed the Act of the Re-Establishment of the State of Lithuania.
