= Algirdas Sysas =

Lithuanian politician

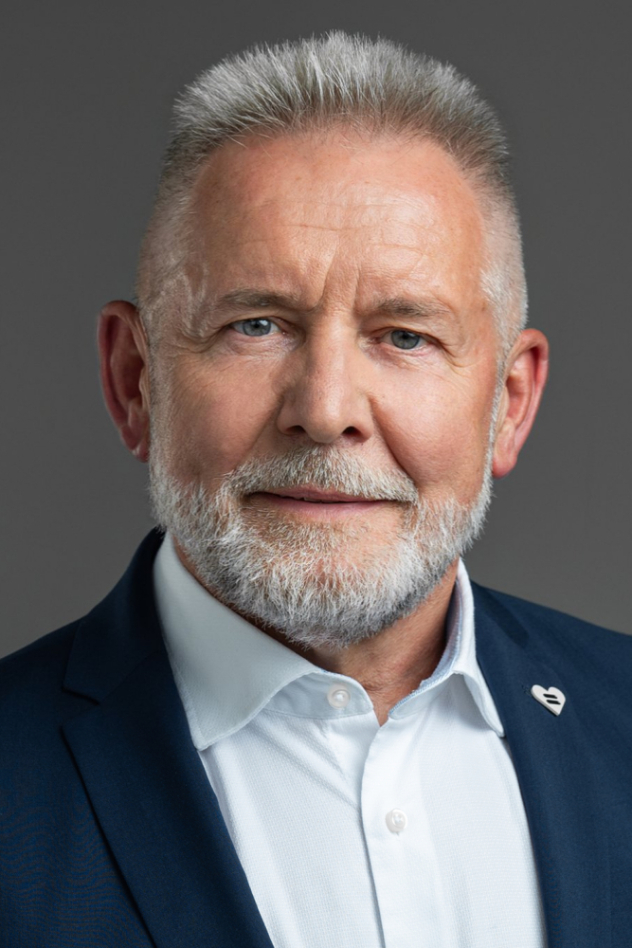

Member of the Seimas
- Incumbent
- Assumed office 25 November 1996
- Constituency: Multi-member

Personal details
- Born: 5 March 1954 (age 72) Vilnius, Lithuania
- Party: Social Democratic Party of Lithuania

Algirdas Sysas (born 5 March 1954 in Vilnius, Lithuania) is a Lithuanian social democratic politician and trade unionist. He is the Deputy Speaker of the Seimas (Parliament) of the Republic of Lithuania since November 2012 and Deputy Chair of the Lithuanian Social Democratic Party (LSDP) since 2009. Prior to political activities, Sysas was the leader and initiator of the independent Lithuanian trade unions.

== Education ==
Sysas first studied radio-electronics and graduated Vilnius Polytechnic College in 1973. After three years of compulsory service at the Soviet Navy (Military Maritime Fleet of the Soviet Union), he continued his studies at Faculty of Economics at Vilnius University. He graduated in 1982 receiving a diploma in Labour Economics.

== Trade unions ==
Sysas started his professional career as a worker at a radio measurement device factory. In 1976 he joined a company producing magnetic tape recorders VILMA. From worker to head of shop, and subsequently deputy head of a major division, Sysas was elected chairman of the factory trade union in 1987. From 1989, he led the independent Lithuanian Metalworkers' Union as its elected chairman, and a year later he organised and chaired Unification, the independent Lithuanian Trade Union. As the Soviet Union was crumbling and Lithuania was regaining political independence, the Unification was cooperating and supporting the independent Social Democratic Party. Finally, Sysas lead the consolidation of the Unification and another major national Trade Union Centre to become the Lithuanian Trade Union Confederation.

== Political career ==
In 1995 he was elected at Vilnius municipal elections as a trade union candidate listed on the Social Democratic Party list, and worked at the municipal Social Affairs Committee. In 1996 he was listed as a non-party member on the Social Democratic Party list and was elected for the first time to the Seimas (Lithuanian Parliament), where Social Democrats won 9 seats. Sysas was re-elected in 2000, 2004, 2008 and 2012 (five consecutive mandates). He joined the Social Democratic Party in 2006.

=== Political offices in the Seimas ===
- 1996–2000: Member of Committee on Social Affairs and Labour
- 2000–2001: Deputy Chair of Committee on Social Affairs and Labour
- 2001–2008: Chair of Committee on Social Affairs and Labour
- 2004–present: Member of the parliamentary Commission on Drugs and Alcoholism Prevention
- 2008–2012: Member of Committee on Social Affairs and Labour
- 2012–2013: Member of the parliamentary Audit Committee
- 2012–present: Deputy Speaker of the Seimas, Member of Committee on Social Affairs and Labour,
- As of 2013: Member of parliamentary groups of Child Welfare, Development Co-operation and Reproductive Health and Rights.

Sysas belongs to the inter-parliamentary relations groups with Austria, China, France, Germany, Japan, North European countries (Denmark, Finland, Iceland, Norway, Sweden), Poland and Romania.

Since 2012, Sysas is Chair of the Seimas Delegation in the Parliamentary Assembly of the Organization for Security and Co-operation in Europe as well as a Member in the Seimas Delegation in the Inter-Parliamentary Lithuanian–Polish Assembly.

== Personal life and activities ==
Sysas is married and has two children and one granddaughter.

Sysas has been promoting healthy lifestyle and daily exercise. He has been adept at orienteering since the 1970s, participating in numerous local, national and international competitions. Sysas is President of local club Labirintas (Labyrinth) and was President of Lithuanian Orienteering Federation in 1999–2006. He is also a long-distance (including marathon and half-marathon) runner, participates in multichallenge (multisports, that include running or orienteering, cycling, water sports, etc.) competitions, practices skiing (cross-country and mountain), etc.

== Political views and quotes ==
1. Social dialogue. A. Sysas has been promoting social dialogue, but it has not been among priorities of Lithuanian governments, even leftist.
2. On social insurance. 'If we want to have more people joining the national social insurance system, we have to guarantee higher social benefits from the fund. On the other hand, fixed ceiling is not acceptable'.
3. Effective tax rates. Sysas is the proponent of progressive tax system which would apply to all income and wealth. He argues that it has been a mistake of a number of Lithuanian governments and the non-existent progressive tax has damaged the idea of solidarity in the society, added to the divide and social exclusion as well as huge emigration to countries of progressive taxation (UK, Ireland, Norway, Germany, etc.). 'Progressive taxation characterises society where social justice is prevalent. Harsh criticism of progressive tax is the sign of envy. It is common in some societies which still live in culture of poverty (Dickensian), where people tend to be narrow-minded and of low social intelligence. Societies, where people fear that those living in poverty might be living better at some point'.
4. On Nuclear Power Station in Lithuania. 'I can only speak for myself - I do not want nuclear power plant. I support the majority who said „No to the power plant“ in the referendum. In case we decide to go against this decision, we need to hold referendum again. Judging from what is happening around, what the electricity needs are, what technologies exist, we have already incurred losses. Neighboring countries are building two nuclear power plants which implies that there will be enough electricity in the region and it will be possible to buy it on the market.
