= Raimundas Palaitis =

Lithuanian politician

Minister of the Interior
- In office 9 December 2008 – 13 December 2012
- Prime Minister: Andrius Kubilius

Personal details
- Born: 23 October 1957 (age 68) Palanga, Lithuania

Raimundas Palaitis (born 23 October 1957) is a Lithuanian politician. He was a Minister of the Interior from 2008 to 2012.
