= Pranas Vilkas =

Lithuanian politician

Pranas Vilkas MP

Member of the Seimas
- In office 19 October 2000 – 17 November 2008

Personal details
- Born: 20 July 1936 Gaižiūnai, Jonava District Municipality
- Party: Liberal Union (2000–2003); Liberal Democratic Party (2003-2004); Labour Party (2004–2008)
- Education: Kaunas University of Technology

Pranas Vilkas (born 1936) is a Lithuanian politician.

Vilkas was a member of the Seimas (Lithuanian parliament) from 2000 to 2008. From 2000 to 2003, Vilkas was a member of the Liberal Union. From 2003 to 2004 he was a member of the Liberal Democratic Party (now called Order and Justice). From 2004 to 2008, Vilkas was a member of Seimas as a representative of the Labour Party.
