= Rasa Juknevičienė =

Lithuanian politician (born 1958)

Rasa Juknevičienė MEP
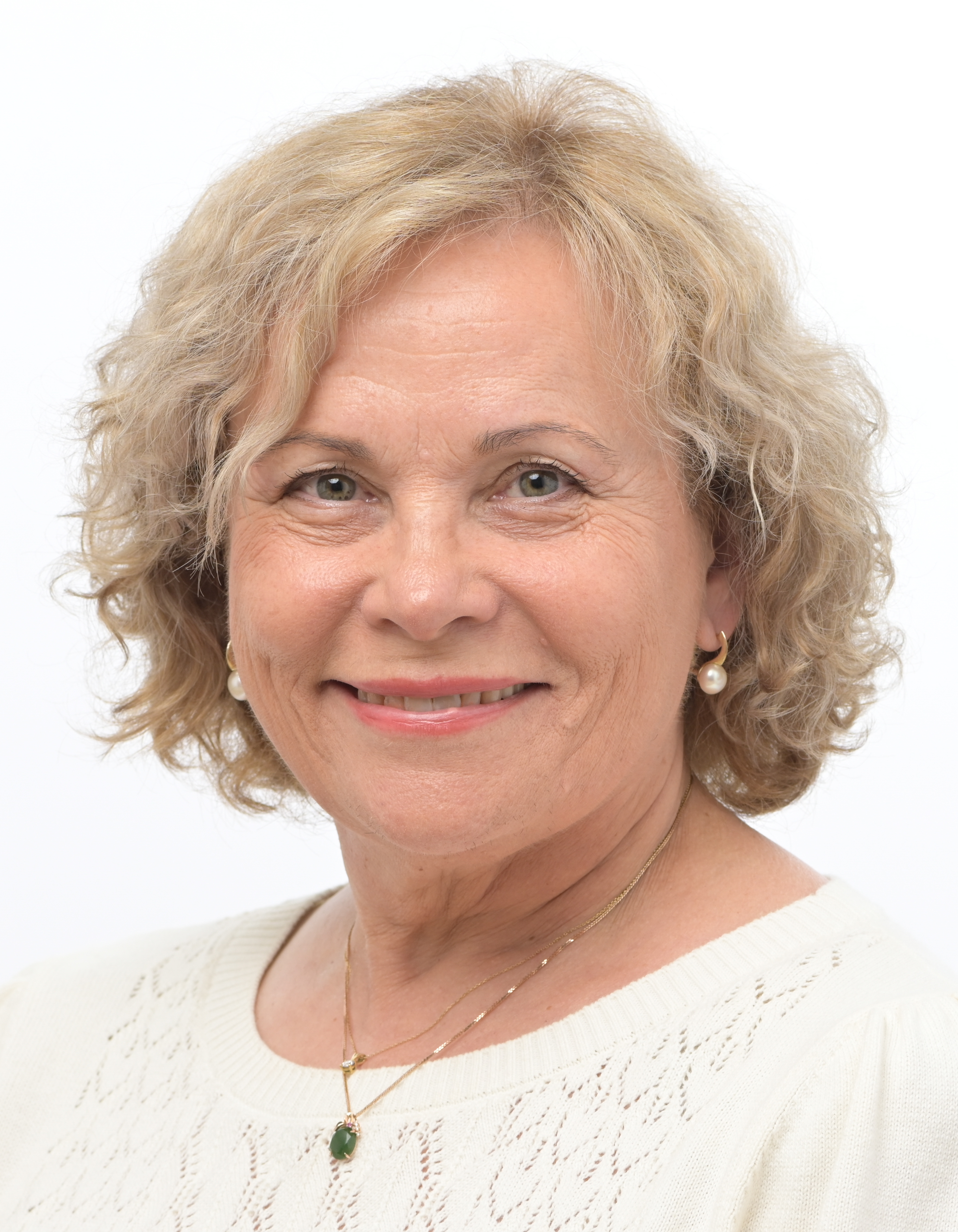
- Juknevičienė in 2018

Member of the European Parliament
- Incumbent
- Assumed office 2 July 2019
- Constituency: Lithuania

President of the NATO Parliamentary Assembly
- In office 24 March 2018 – 19 November 2018
- Preceded by: Paolo Alli
- Succeeded by: Madeleine Moon

Vice President of the NATO Parliamentary Assembly
- In office 21 November 2016 – 24 March 2018

Minister of National Defence
- In office 9 December 2008 – 13 December 2012
- President: Valdas Adamkus; Dalia Grybauskaitė
- Prime Minister: Andrius Kubilius
- Preceded by: Juozas Olekas
- Succeeded by: Juozas Olekas

Deputy Speaker of the Seimas
- In office 9 November 1999 – 18 October 2000

Member of the Seimas
- In office 14 November 2016 – 1 July 2019
- Succeeded by: Aistė Gedvilienė
- Constituency: Multi-member
- In office 15 November 2004 – 14 November 2016
- Preceded by: Henrikas Žukauskas
- Succeeded by: Post abolished Gabrielius Landsbergis (Centras-Žaliakalnis)
- Constituency: Žaliakalnis
- In office 19 October 2000 – 14 November 2004
- Constituency: Multi-member
- In office 25 November 1996 – 18 October 2000
- Preceded by: Feliksas Kolosauskas
- Succeeded by: Antanas Baura
- Constituency: Anykščiai-Kupiškis

Personal details
- Born: 26 January 1958 (age 68) Tiltagaliai, Lithuanian SSR, Soviet Union
- Party: Homeland Union
- Spouse

Rasa Juknevičienė (née Urbonaitė, born 26 January 1958) is a Lithuanian politician who has been serving as a Member of the European Parliament since 2019. She served as Minister of Defense of Lithuania since 2008 to 2012. She is a member of the Homeland Union.

== Early life and education ==
Juknevičienė is a graduate of the Lithuanian University of Health Sciences (LSMU) and worked as a doctor until 1992. She was born in Tiltagaliai,Lithuania.

== Political career ==
=== Career in national politics ===
With interruptions, Juknevičienė was a member of the Seimas (parliament of Lithuania) from 1996 until 2019. During her time in parliament, she held positions as deputy chair of the Committee on National Security and Defense and head of the Seimas Delegation to the NATO Parliamentary Assembly.

Juknevičienė has been member of the Lithuanian delegation to the NATO Parliamentary Assembly since 1999. She was rapporteur of the Sub-Committee on NATO Partnerships from 2007 to 2008. She served as the Assembly's vice-president from 2016 until 2018, when she became president.

=== Member of the European Parliament, 2019–present ===
Since the 2019 European Parliament election, Juknevičienė has been serving on the Parliament's Committee on Development. In 2021, she became vice-chair of the Group of the European People's Party in the European Parliament.

In addition to her committee assignments, Juknevičienė is part of the European Parliament Intergroup on Artificial Intelligence and Digital and the MEPs Against Cancer group.

In 2024, Juknevičienė was awarded the Order of Friendship by the Chechen government in exile for her support for Chechnya.

== Other activities ==
- European Council on Foreign Relations (ECFR), Member
- Center for European Policy Analysis (CEPA), Member of the Advisory Council (since 2014)
- Facebook.

Seimas
Preceded by Henrikas Žukauskas	Member of the Seimas for Žaliakalnis; 2004–2016	Succeeded by Gabrielius Landsbergis (Centras-Žaliakalnis)
