= Žygimantas Pavilionis =

Lithuanian diplomat and politician

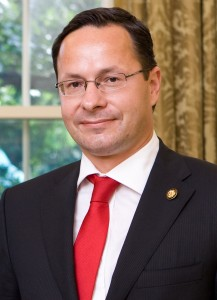

Deputy Speaker of the Seimas
- In office 16 July 2024 – 14 November 2024
- Preceded by: Radvilė Morkūnaitė-Mikulėnienė
- Succeeded by: Rasa Budbergytė

Member of the Seimas
- Incumbent
- Assumed office 13 November 2020
- Preceded by: Himself (Naujamiestis)
- Constituency: Naujamiestis – Naujininkai
- In office 14 November 2016 – 12 November 2020
- Preceded by: Irena Degutienė
- Succeeded by: Post abolished
- Constituency: Naujamiestis

Ambassador of the Republic of Lithuania to the United States of America and Mexico
- In office 5 August 2010 – 30 July 2015
- President: Dalia Grybauskaitė
- Prime Minister: Algirdas Butkevičius; Andrius Kubilius
- Preceded by: Audrius Brūzga
- Succeeded by: Rolandas Kriščiūnas

Personal details
- Born: 22 July 1971 (age 55) Vilnius, Lithuanian SSR, Soviet Union
- Party: Homeland Union
- Spouse(s): Lina Pavilionienė (m.1995; d.2019); Asta Mikutavičiūtė-Pavilionienė (m.2021)
- Children: 4
- Education: Vilnius University

Žygimantas Pavilionis (born 22 July 1971 in Vilnius) is a Lithuanian politician, Member of the Seimas, and former Lithuanian diplomat. From August 2010 to July 2015, he served as Lithuania's Ambassador to United States and Mexico (2011).

== Early life and education ==
Žygimantas Pavilionis was born in 1971 in Vilnius, Lithuania.

In 1994 graduated from Vilnius University Institute of International Relations and Political Science. In 1995 he received a master's degree from Vilnius University's Faculty of Philosophy.

== Diplomatic service ==
Between 1993 and 1999 he worked as the 3rd Secretary of the Ministry of Foreign Affairs of Lithuania for Western Europe, Assistant of Director of the Political Department, 1st Secretary of the Political Cooperation Division of the European Integration Department, Head of this Division.

From 1999 to 2001 he worked in Brussels, as an Advisor to the Lithuanian Permanent Mission to the European Union, Minister-Adviser. Between 2001 and 2002 Pavilionis was an Adviser to the Minister of the Lithuanian Mission to the European Communities.

From 2002 to 2006 he was Head of the Department of European (later European Union) Integration of the Ministry of Foreign Affairs of Lithuania, was the Deputy of Chief Negotiator of Lithuania with the EU Vygaudas Ušackas.

Between 2006 and 2009 worked as Secretary of the Ministry of Foreign Affairs of Lithuania, 2009–2010 – Ambassador Extraordinary and Plenipotentiary to the Department of Transatlantic Cooperation and Politics, coordinated the Lithuanian Presidency of the Community of Democracies.

On 19 July 2010 President Dalia Grybauskaitė appointed Pavilionis as Lithuanian Ambassador Extraordinary and Plenipotentiary to the United States and Mexico. He left the office on 30 July 2015.

== Political life ==
Since November 2016 he is Member of the Seimas elected in Naujamiestis constituency (from 2020 Naujamiestis-Naujininkai constituency). Pavilionis was considered one of the potential candidates in 2019 presidential election.

== Private life ==
Pavilionis's father is the academic Rolandas Pavilionis, and his mother is the professor Marija Aušrinė Pavilionienė. His ex-wife Lina is a physician, and they have four sons: Augustas, Dominykas, Simonas, and Vincentas. In addition to Lithuanian, which is his native language, he is fluent in English, Italian, Russian, French, German, Latin, and Hebrew.

Seimas
Preceded by Irena Degutienė (Naujamiestis)	Member of the Seimas for Naujamiestis/Naujamiestis and Naujininkai; 2016–present	Incumbent
