= Rolandas Pavilionis =

Lithuanian academic and politician (1944–2006)

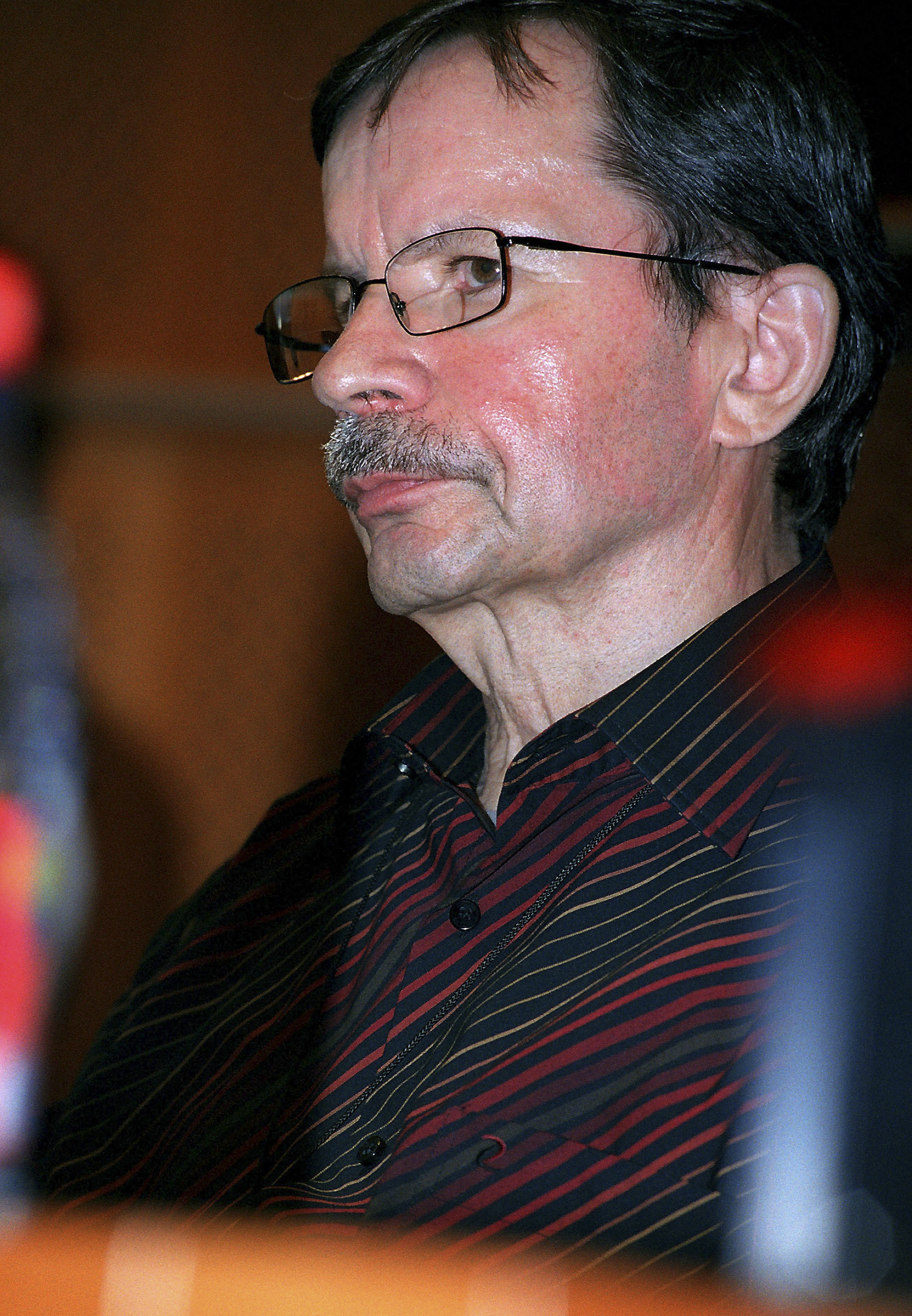
- Pavilionis in 2004

Member of the European Parliament for Lithuania
- In office 20 July 2004 – 10 May 2006

Member of the Seimas
- In office 8 October 2000 – 20 July 2004

Personal details
- Born: 3 July 1944 Šiauliai, Lithuania
- Died: 10 May 2006 (aged 61) Vilnius, Lithuania
- Party: Liberal Democratic Party
- Spouse: Marija Aušrinė
- Children: 2 (Šarūnas, Žygimantas)
- Education: Vilnius University; Sorbonne University

Rolandas Pavilionis (3 July 1944 – 10 May 2006) was a Lithuanian academic and politician who was a Member of the European Parliament from 2004 to 2006 as a member of the Liberal Democratic Party; part of the Union for a Europe of Nations. He previously served as rector of Vilnius University from 1990 to 2000, and as a member of the Seimas from 2000 to 2004.

== Biography ==
Rolandas Pavilionis was born on 3 July 1944 in the western Lithuanian city of Šiauliai. In 1962, he graduated from a night-school for workers in Šiauliai, attending the school at night after finishing his work at a bicycle factory. The same year he was admitted to Vilnius University to study foreign languages. In 1968 he graduated the university with a degree in philology. From 1968 to 1971 he continued postgraduate studies at the Academy of Sciences of Ukraine and earned a doctor's degree in logic. Pavilionis then returned to Lithuania and joined Vilnius University as member of the faculty (1971–1977 docent, 1982–1990 professor). For some time he was the head of the Department of History of Philosophy and Logic.

Pavilionis took courses at the Sorbonne University of Paris under Algirdas Julius Greimas. In 1981 Pavilionis defended his thesis in the field of language logic and philosophy of logic, earning degree of Habilitated Doctor of Logic.

In 1990 Pavilionis was elected as the rector of Vilnius University. He held the post until 2000, when was elected to Seimas (parliament). In 2004, he was elected to the European Parliament.

Pavilionis died at Santariškės hospital in Vilnius.

== Works ==
Pavilionis was the author of works in Russian, Lithuanian and English.

- „Язык и логика“, 1975,
- „Kalba. Logika. Filosofija“, Vilnius: Mintis, 1981.
- „Проблема смысла: современный логико-философский анализ языка“, Москва: Мысль, 1983.
- „Meaning and conceptual systems“, Moscow: Progress, 1990.
- „Prieš absurdą“, 2000.
- „Tarp šviesos ir tamsos“, 2000.
- „Prieš absurdą II“, 2004.
- „Prasmė ir tapatumas, arba kelionė į save“, Vilnius: Lietuvos mokslas, 2005.
