= Arminas Lydeka =

Lithuanian politician (born 1968)

Member of the Seimas
- Incumbent
- Assumed office 13 November 2020
- In office 8 July 2014 – 14 November 2016
- Preceded by: Petras Auštrevičius
- In office 19 October 2000 – 16 November 2012

Member of the European Parliament for Lithuania
- In office 1 May 2004 – 19 July 2004

Personal details
- Born: 21 February 1968 (age 58)
- Party: LS (since 2010); LiCS (2003–2010); LLS (1998–2003)
- Other political affiliations: ELDR

Arminas Lydeka (born 21 February 1968) is a Lithuanian politician of the Liberals' Movement. He has been a member of the Seimas since 2020, having previously served from 2000 to 2012 and from 2014 to 2016. He was an observer to the European Parliament from 2003 to 2004, and a member of the European Parliament from May to July in 2004.
