= Lomena Landscape Sanctuary =

Protected area in Lithuania

Šušvė Landscape Sanctuary
- IUCN category VI (protected area with sustainable use of natural resources)
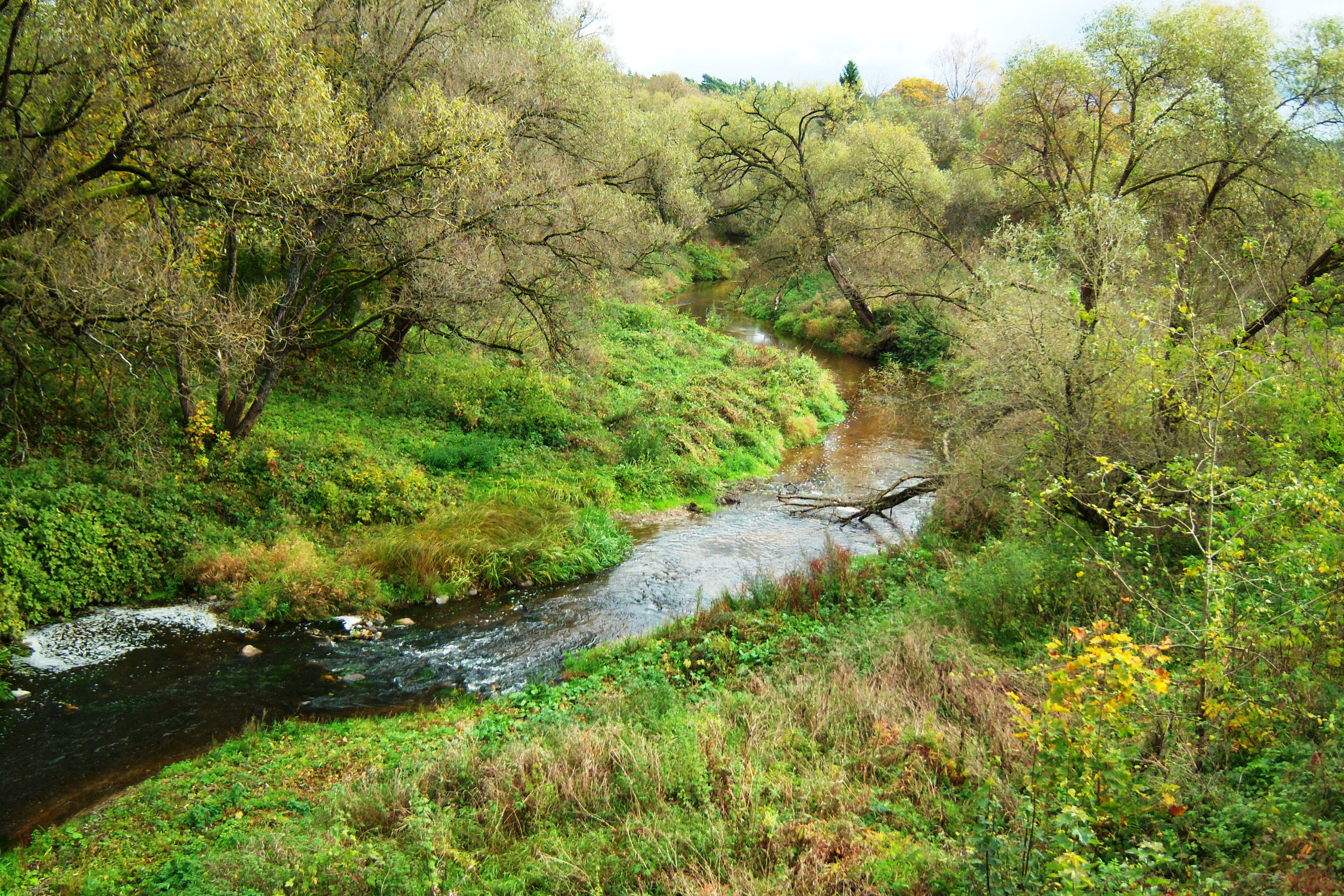
- Lomena next to KK143

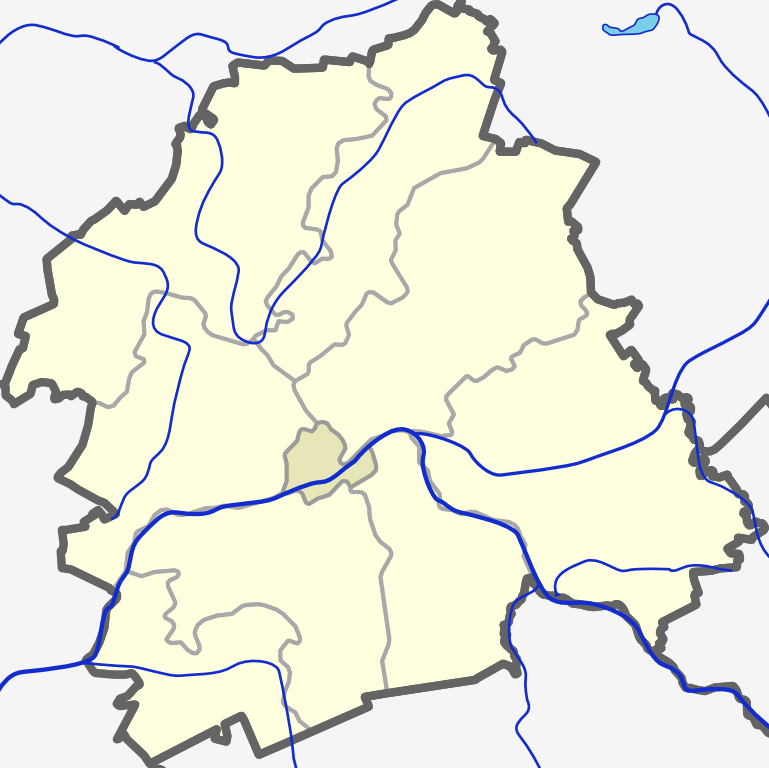
- Location within Lithuania Location within Jonava District Municipality
- Location: Rukla Eldership, Jonava District Municipality, Palomenė Eldership, Kaišiadorys District Municipality
- Nearest town: Rukla, Tartokas, Palomenė
- Coordinates: 55°00′09″N 24°26′06″E
- Area: 5.4 km^{2} (2.1 sq mi)
- Established: 1997
- Governing body: Lithuanian Service of Protected Areas

The Lomena Landscape Sanctuary (Lithuanian: Lomenos kraštovaizdžio draustinis) is a protected area of a state importance between Rukla Eldership, Jonava District Municipality and Palomenė Eldership, Kaišiadorys District Municipality, in central Lithuania. It was established in 1997 and covers an area of 5.4 square kilometres (2.1 sq mi), including the course of the Lomena river.

The aim of the sanctuary is to protect the valley of the Lomena river, including its boulders, flora and fauna.
