= Gaižiūnai Forest =

Forest in Lithuania

Gaižiūnai Forest Lithuanian: Gaižiūnų miškai
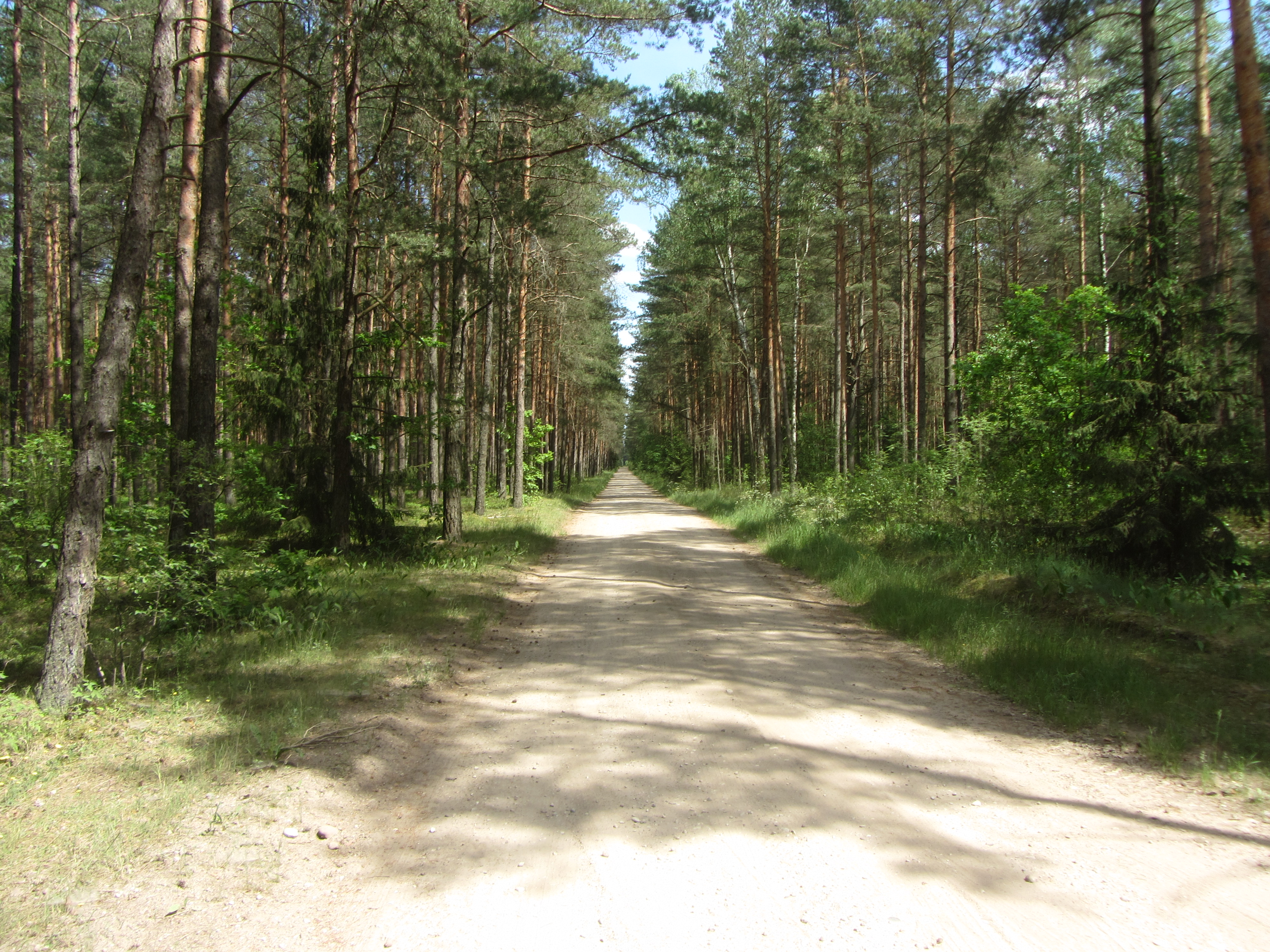
- Forest near Dumsiai

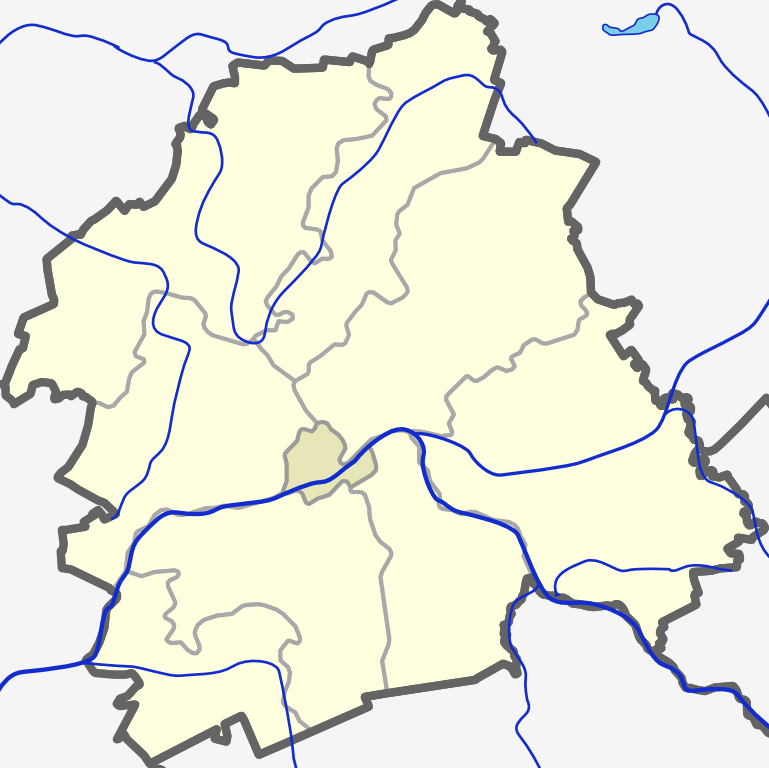
- Location within Lithuania Location within Jonava District Municipality

Geography
- Location: Jonava District Municipality; Kaišiadorys District Municipality, Lithuania
- Coordinates: 54.966667°N 24.3°E
- Area: 290 km^{2} (110 sq mi)

Ecology
- Forest cover: birch, spruce, aspen

The Gaižiūnai Forest (Lithuanian: Gaižiūnų miškai) is a forest in Jonava District Municipality and Kaišiadorys District Municipality, central Lithuania. It covers 290 km^{2} area and it is the seventh largest forest in Lithuania. The KK143 highway passes through the forest.

Forest covers area in two municipalities and three elderships: Rukla Eldership and Šveicarija Eldership in Jonava District Municipality and Palomenė Eldership in Kaišiadorys District Municipality.

Rivers starting in and going through the Gaižiūnai forest: Ruklelė, Taurosta, Varpė, Laukysta, Lomena, Dumsė, Romatas, Šešuva, Želva, Garšas, Pravarta, Karčiupis, Praviena, Nizra, Nedėja.

== Deforestation ==
On 12 June 2019 Lithuanian parliament approved plans for Gaižiūnai forest deforestation in Rukla Eldership. Project affects 0.4395 km^{2} that is going to be turned into military training camp for NATO forces that are currently residing in a nreaby town of Rukla.
