= Lithuania Defense Services =

- Company type: Joint venture
- Industry: Logistical military support
- Founded: March 29, 2022; 3 years ago
- Headquarters: Jonava, Lithuania
- Key people: Sebastian Dietz CEO
- Owner: Rheinmetall (50%); Krauss-Maffei Wegmann (50%)

Lithuania Defense Services is a joint venture company established in 2022 in Lithuania by two German arms manfucturers Rheinmetall and Krauss-Maffei Wegmann in order to provide logistical support for combat vehicles belonging to Lithuanian and other NATO nations armed forces stationing in the Baltic States.

The repair facilities owned by the company are located in Jonava, near the metal processing company Iremas. Previously, the repair facilities of the fertilizer company Achema were located here. The plant covers an area of 12,000 square meters, the workshop itself right 3,000 square meters. At the facilities repaired are: Boxer armored fighting vehicle, its Lithuanian version Vilkas, the Puma infantry fighting vehicle, the Bergepanzer 3 Büffel armored rescue vehicle, various versions of the Leopard 2 tank and the PzH 2000 self-propelled howitzer.

The Jonava plant is located close to the NATO military base in Rukla, and the two cities are connected by a railroad line. Battlegroup Lithuania has its headquarters in Rukla. Since September 2022, Lithuania Defense Services has been engaged in repairing PzH 2000s donated by Germany to the Ukrainian Armed Forces, which were damaged during combat with the Russian invaders.
