= 1st Division (Lithuania) =

- Pirmoji divizija
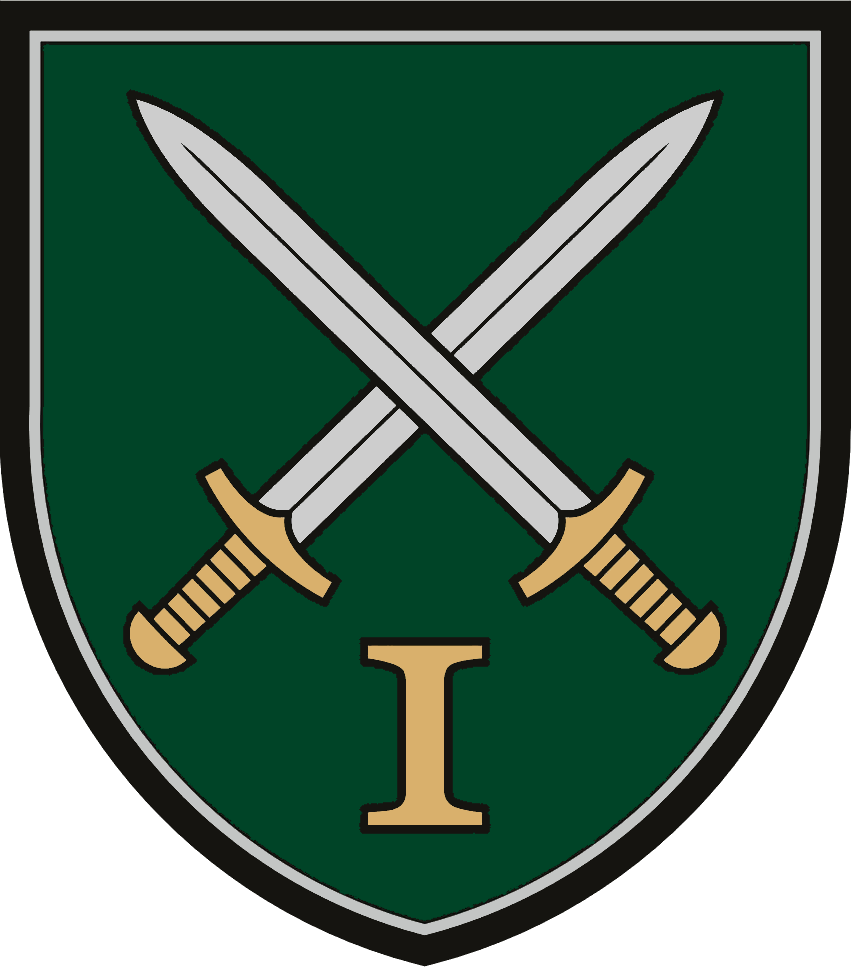
- Divisional symbol
- Active: 11 April 1775–1795; 1920–1923; 1931–1940; 28 January 2025–Present
- Country: Grand Duchy of Lithuania (1775–1795); Lithuania (1920–1923; 1931–1940; 2025–Present)
- Branch: Lithuanian Land Forces
- Type: Division
- Size: ~20,000
- Part of: Multinational Corps Northeast (NATO)
- Garrison/HQ: Kaunas
- Mottos: Unity, Strength, Victory
- Anniversaries: 11–12 April 1775
- Engagements: Polish–Russian War of 1792; Kościuszko Uprising; Lithuanian Wars of Independence; Soviet Invasion of the Baltic states
- Website: Facebook page

Commanders
- Current commander: Brigade general Aurelijus Alasauskas
- Chief of Staff: Lieutenant Colonel Darius Kisielius

Insignia
- Battle flag

The 1st Division (Lithuanian: Pirmoji divizija) is the main military unit of the Land Forces of the Lithuanian Armed Forces. The division is planned to reach full operational capacity by 2030.

As of January 2025, the division consists of a command headquarters, three infantry brigades, engineering and artillery regiments, as well as a reconnaissance battalion. Units of other military branches are also used to support the division.

== History ==
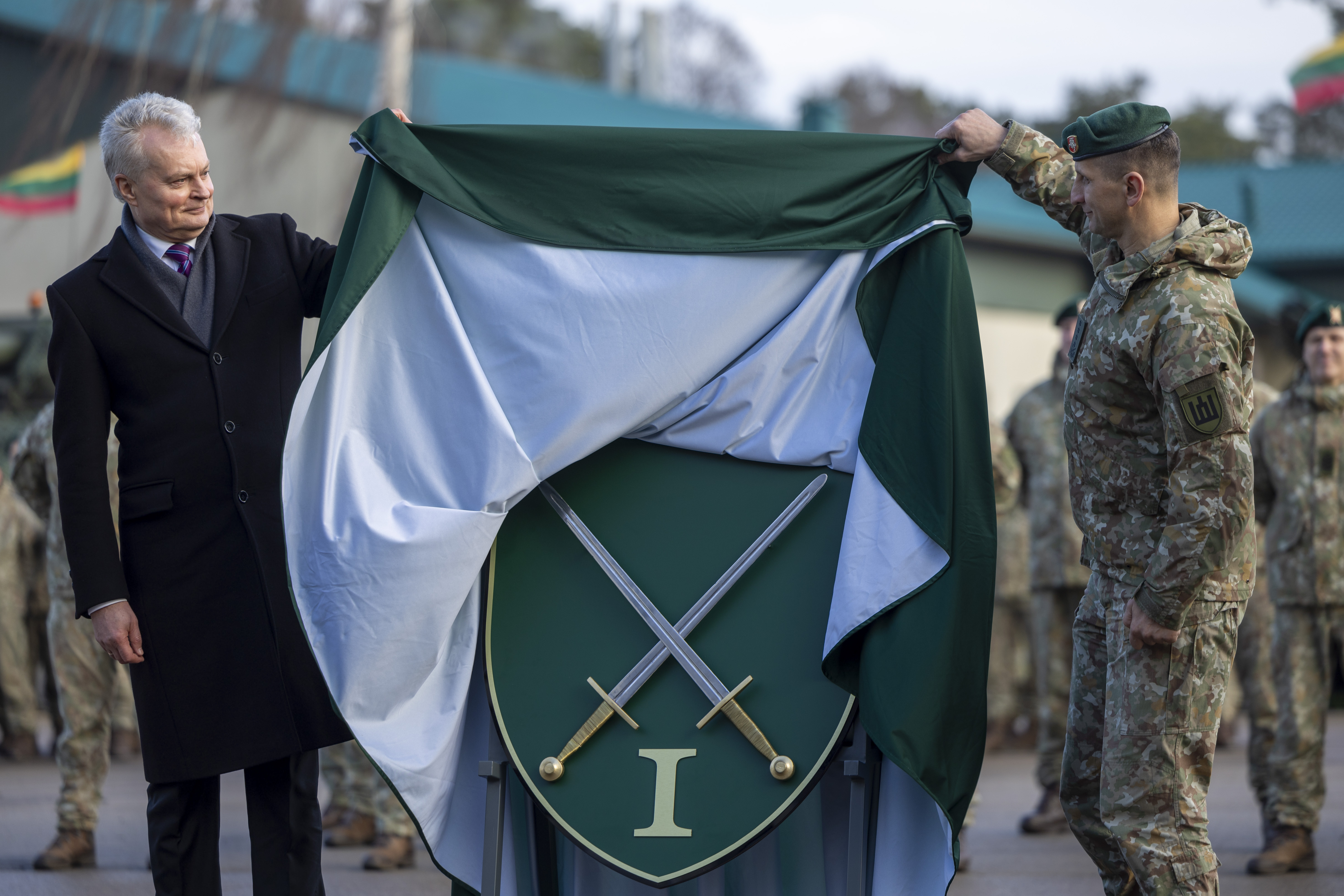
On January 28, 2025, the president of Lithuania, Gitanas Nausėda, and the chief of defence, General Raimundas Vaikšnoras, unveiled the division's emblem.

The 1st Division continues the traditions of the Grand Ducal Lithuanian Army's 1st Lithuanian Division.

=== 1775–1795 ===
Officially, the Grand Ducal Lithuanian Army's 1st and 2nd Divisions were established on April 11–12, 1775, after the Sejm of the Polish–Lithuanian Commonwealth approved the framework. However, the actual formation through the transformation of the old units into a new structure began in 1777. The divisions were equivalent to a modern military district.

The first commander of the 1st Lithuanian Division was Lieutenant General Józef Judycki, the Grand Guard of Lithuania (1776–1789), the elder of Strzalków and Bohiń.

Divisional commanders

- Adam Kazimierz Czartoryski (nominal commander, patron, colonel-in-chief);
- Józef Judycki
- Michał Grzegorz Grabowski

=== 1920–1940 ===
In 1918, after the restoration of Lithuanian statehood, the Lithuanian army and its regiments were reborn, which were combined into brigades in 1919. On 10 February 1920, the 1st Division was re-formed based on the 1st Brigade, which had fought extensively in the Lithuanian Wars of Independence, as the three infantry brigades of the Lithuanian Army were reorganised into divisions. The 1st Division had three infantry regiments and three independent battalions.

==== World War II ====
With the outbreak of World War II in 1939, the 1st Division was mobilized to defend the borders of Lithuania and ensure the security of Vilnius and elsewhere in Lithuania.

As of 1940, the 1st Infantry Division comprised headquarters, 3 infantry regiments and 2 artillery regiments. In addition, it included Military Commandant's Offices (Lithuanian: Karo komendantūra) for the city of Vilnius and the districts of Biržai, Kėdainiai, Panevėžys, Raseiniai, Rokiškis, Švenčionėliai, Trakai, Ukmergė, Utena and Zarasai.

=== Lithuanian resistance ===
After the government's surrender to the Soviet ultimatum to Lithuania in 1940 and the subsequent Soviet occupation, the Lithuanian Army was disbanded, but the 1st Division's soldiers went on to fight for Lithuania against the occupation as partisans.

=== 21st century ===
At the 2022 Madrid Summit, the main military tactical unit was upscaled from a brigade to a division in NATO's military plans. In May 2023, the Lithuanian State Defence Council approved the future formation of a division. In order to establish a Lithuanian Infantry Division with a tank battalion, on 11 July 2024 the Seimas approved changes to the basic structure of the Lithuanian Armed Forces, which entered into force on 18 July 2024.

== Structure ==
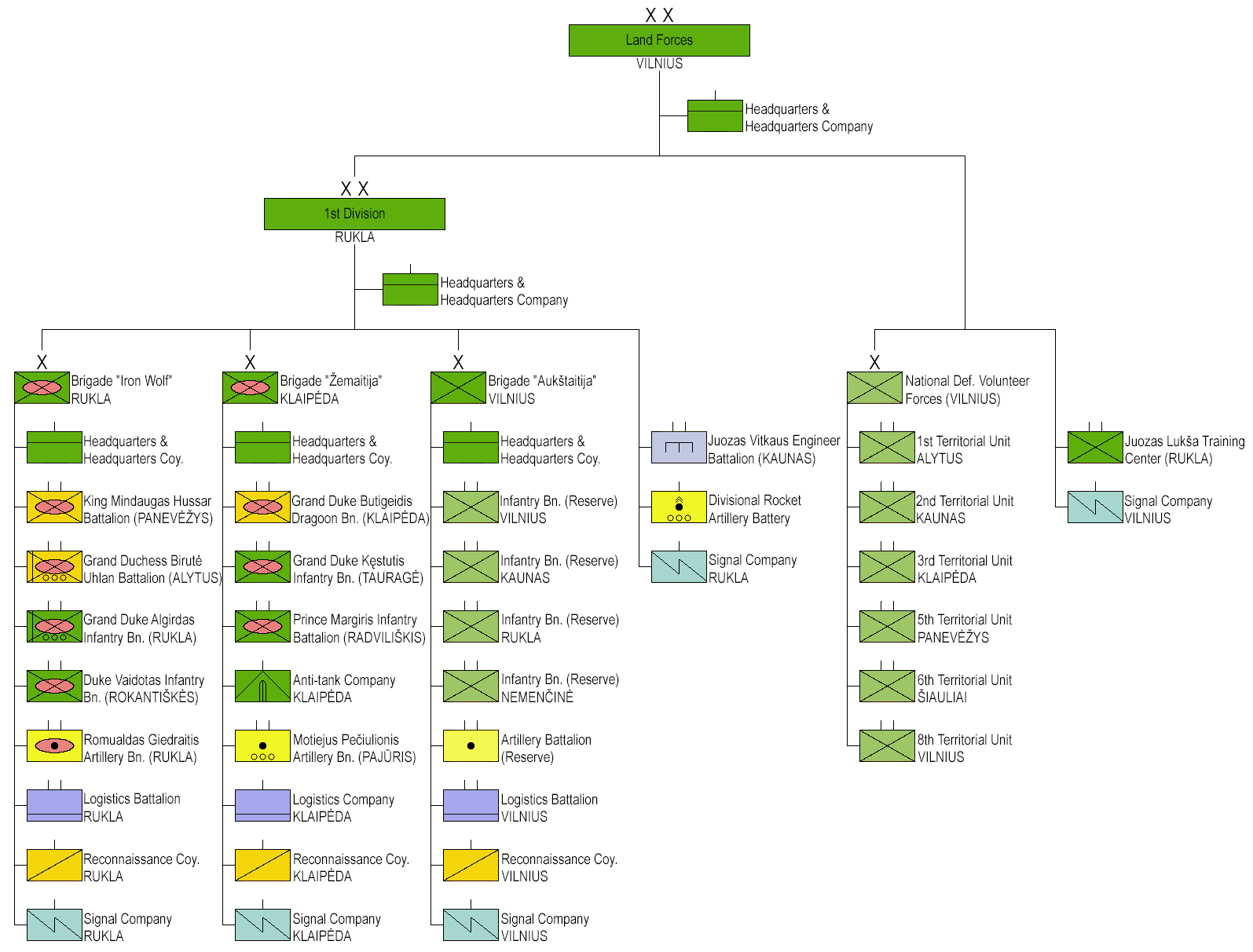
Lithuanian Land Forces organization 2025 (click to enlarge)

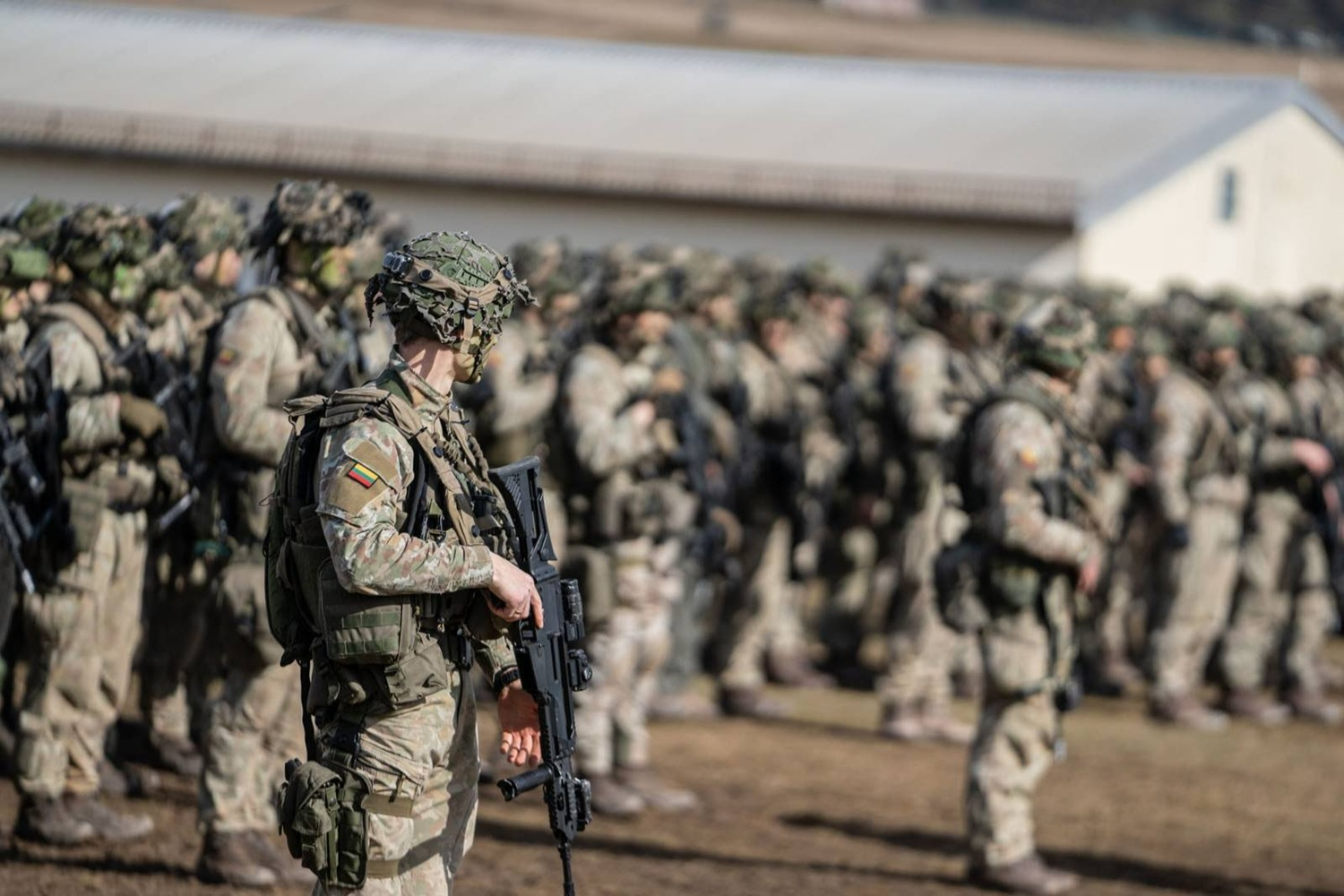
1st Division Brigade "Žemaitija" and other divisional troops during Allied Spirit 2025 exercise

The 1st Division was re-established on 28 January 2025 in Rukla. and received the brigades Iron Wolf, Žemaitija and Aukštaitija, as well as supporting units. The division will be fully operational by 2030. As of 2026 the division consists of the following units:

1st Division, in Rukla

- Headquarters and Headquarters Company, in Rukla
  - Signals Company
  - Reconnaissance Company
  - Logistics Company
  - Rocket Artillery Battery
- Artillery Regiment, in Rukla (Initial Command Element)
- Colonel Juozas Vitkus Engineer Regiment, in Kaunas
- Brigade "Iron Wolf", in Rukla
  - Headquarters and Headquarters Company, in Rukla
    - Reconnaissance Company, in Rukla
    - Anti-tank Company, in Rukla
    - Signals Company, in Rukla
  - Tank Battalion, in Rukla (Initial Command Element)
  - King Mindaugas Hussar Battalion, in Panevėžys
  - Grand Duchess Birutė Uhlan Battalion, in Alytus
  - Grand Duke Algirdas Infantry Battalion, in Rukla
  - Duke Vaidotas Infantry Battalion, in Rokantiškės
  - General Romualdas Giedraitis Artillery Battalion, in Rukla
  - Lieutenant general Jokūbas Jasinskis Logistics battalion, in Rukla
- Brigade "Žemaitija", in Klaipėda
  - Headquarters and Headquarters Company, in Klaipėda
    - Reconnaissance Company
    - Anti-tank Company, in Klaipėda
    - Signals Company
  - Grand Duke Butigeidis Dragoon Battalion, in Klaipėda
  - Grand Duke Kęstutis Infantry Battalion, in Tauragė
  - Prince Margiris Infantry Battalion, in Šiauliai
  - Brigadier General Motiejus Pečiulionis Artillery Battalion, in Pajūris
  - Logistics Battalion, in Kairiai
- Brigade "Aukštaitija", in Pajuostis
  - Initial Command Element, in Pajuostis
  - Logistics Battalion, in Vilnius

== Commanders ==
Division commanders

- Brigadier General Aurelijus Alasauskas (2025 — )

== Sources ==
- Biržietis, Dominykas (2025-01-28). "Rukloje inauguruota Pirmąja pavadinta Lietuvos kariuomenės divizija". Baltic News Service (in Lithuanian).
- kam.lt (2025-01-28). "Lithuania re-establishes the 1st Division of the Lithuanian Armed Forces". LR Krašto apsaugos ministerija.
- kariuomene.lt (2025). "Lietuvos kariuomenės Pirmoji divizija". Lietuvos kariuomenė (in Lithuanian).
- Surgailis, Gintautas (2024). Lietuvos kariuomenės istorija (PDF) (in Lithuanian). Vol. I (Part 1). Vilnius: Generolo Jono Žemaičio Lietuvos Karo Akademija. ISBN 978-609-8277-55-5.

=== Universal Lithuanian Encyclopedia ===
- Kisinas, Eugenijus Simonas (2018). "Divizija". Universal Lithuanian Encyclopedia (in Lithuanian).
- Spečiūnas, Vytautas; Knezys, Stasys; Gaidys, Arvydas (2018). "Lietuvos ginkluotosios pajėgos 1918–1940". Universal Lithuanian Encyclopedia (in Lithuanian).
