= Pratkūnai =

- Village
- Location within Lithuania
- Coordinates: 54°46′41″N 24°12′29″E
- Ethnographic region: Aukštaitija
- County: Kaunas County
- Municipality: Kaišiadorys District Municipality
- Eldership: Kruonis Eldership

Population (2021)
  - Total: 8
- Time zone: UTC+2 (EET)
  - Summer (DST): UTC+3 (EEST)

Pratkūnai is a village in Kaišiadorys District Municipality, Lithuania, 3 km from Kruonis.

On 15 September 2026 during the Russo-Ukrainian war, a drone was being shot down by a NATO fighter jet over the village that had crossed from Belarusian airspace into Lithuania.

== Population ==
Year	Population
1905	41
1923	49
1959	44
1970	28
1979	25
1989	12
2001	6
2011	11
2021	8
