= Rukla Eldership =

Rukla Eldership Ruklos seniūnija
- Eldership
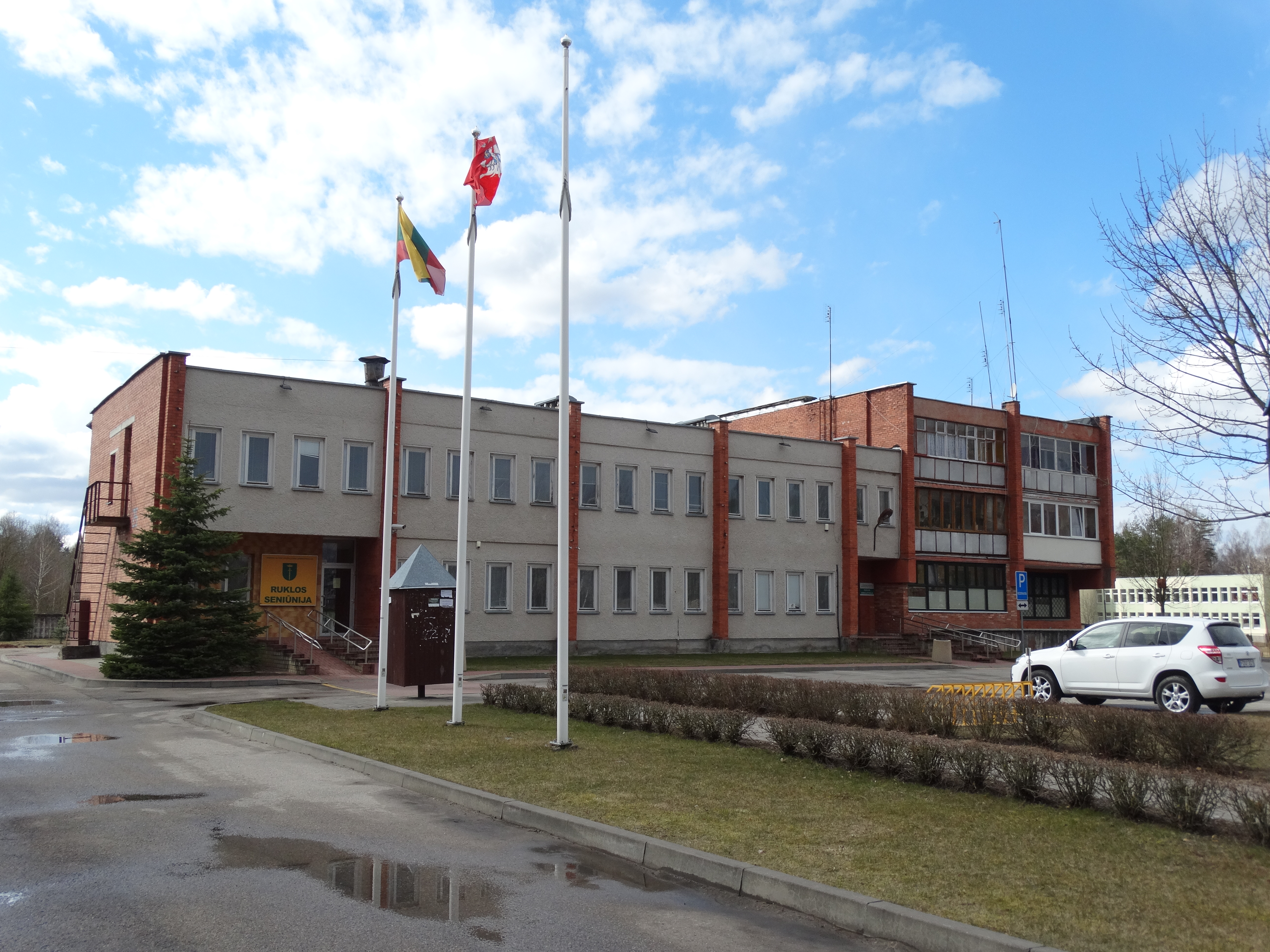
- Rukla Eldership office

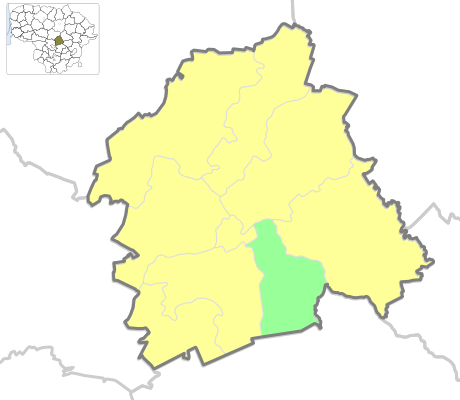
- Location of Rukla eldership
- Coordinates: 55°01′57″N 24°22′37″E
- Country: Lithuania
- Ethnographic region: Aukštaitija
- County: Kaunas County
- Municipality: Jonava District Municipality
- Administrative centre: Rukla

Area
  - Total: 72.32 km^{2} (27.92 sq mi)

Population (2021)
  - Total: 2,210
  - Density: 30.6/km^{2} (79.1/sq mi)
- Time zone: UTC+2 (EET)
  - Summer (DST): UTC+3 (EEST)

Rukla Eldership (Lithuanian: Ruklos seniūnija) is a Lithuanian eldership, located in a southern part of Jonava District Municipality. As of 2020, administrative centre and largest settlement within eldership was Rukla.

== Geography ==
- Rivers: Neris, Lankesa, Lomena;
- Forests: Gaižiūnai Forest;
- Protected areas: Lomena Landscape Sanctuary

79.03 % of Rukla eldership's whole area is covered in forests.

== Populated places ==
Following settlements are located in the Rukla Eldership (as for 2011 census):

- Towns: Rukla
- Villages: Jonalaukis, Kamšalai, Konstantinava, Rukla village, Tartokas, Venecija

== Transport ==
KK143 is the main road connecting settlements with Jonava.

== Demography ==
Historical population

Year	Pop.	±% p.a.
2001	2,509	—
2011	2,232	−1.16%

Year	Pop.	±% p.a.
2021	2,210	−0.10%

Source: 1902, 1923, 1959 & 1970, 1979, 1989, 2001, 20112021

== Elections ==
=== 2023 municipality elections ===
Political party	Municipality elections	
Political party	Votes	%
Social Democratic Party of Lithuania	236	44.5%
Homeland Union	77	14.5%
Labour Party	49	9.3%
Lithuanian Farmers and Greens Union	43	8.1%
Liberals' Movement	36	6.8%
Union of Democrats "For Lithuania"	25	4.7%
Lithuanian Regions Party	23	4.3%
Political committee Our Jonava	22	4.2%
Freedom Party (Lithuania)	6	1.1%
Total registered voters: 1,770		Turnout: 29.94%
