= Pravieniškės Eldership =

Eldership of Lithuania

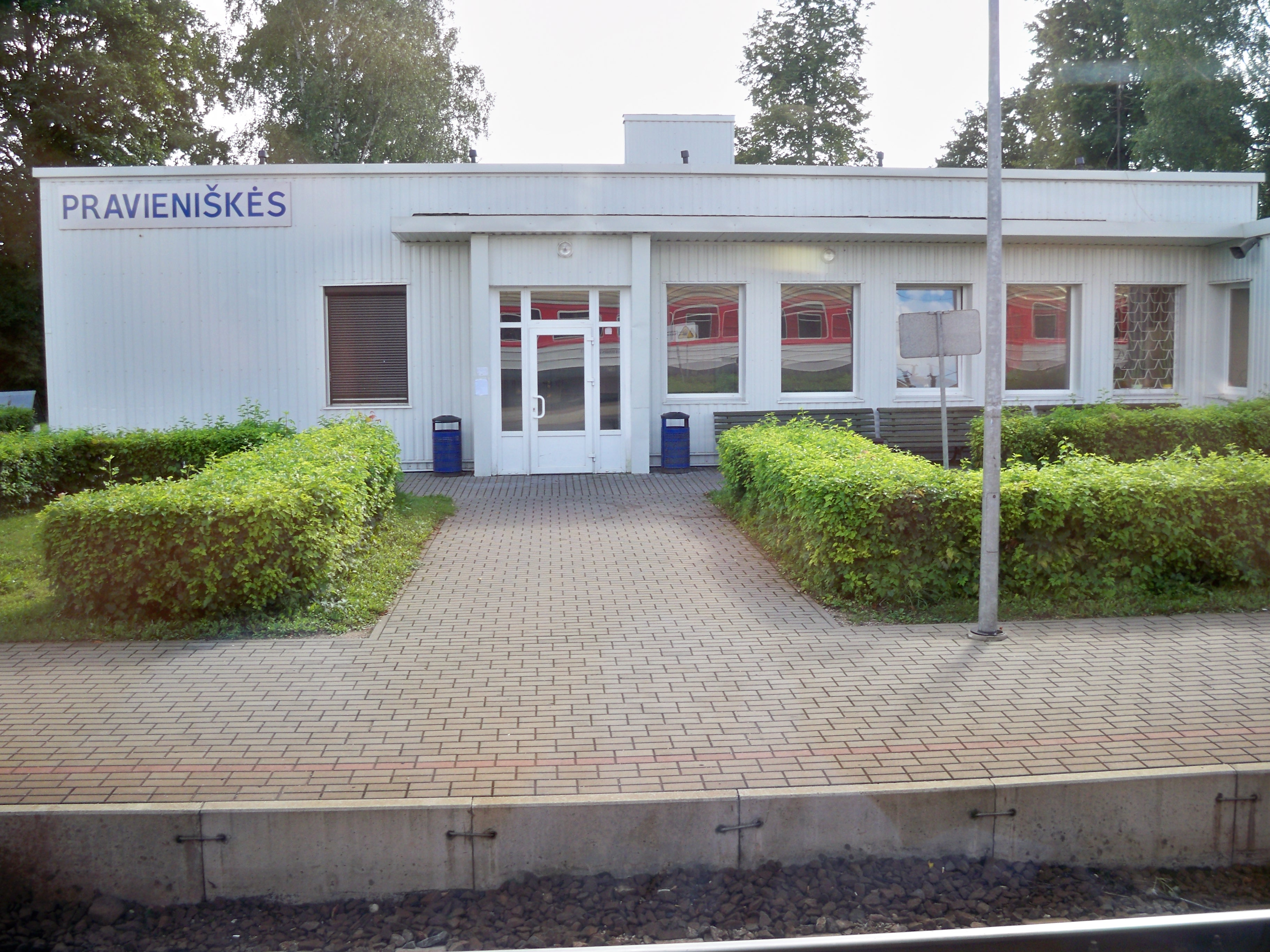
Pravieniškės Train Station

The Pravieniškės Eldership (Lithuanian: Pravieniškių seniūnija) is an eldership of Lithuania, located in the Kaišiadorys District Municipality. In 2021 its population was 3233.
