= Tank Battalion (Lithuania) =

- Tankų batalionas
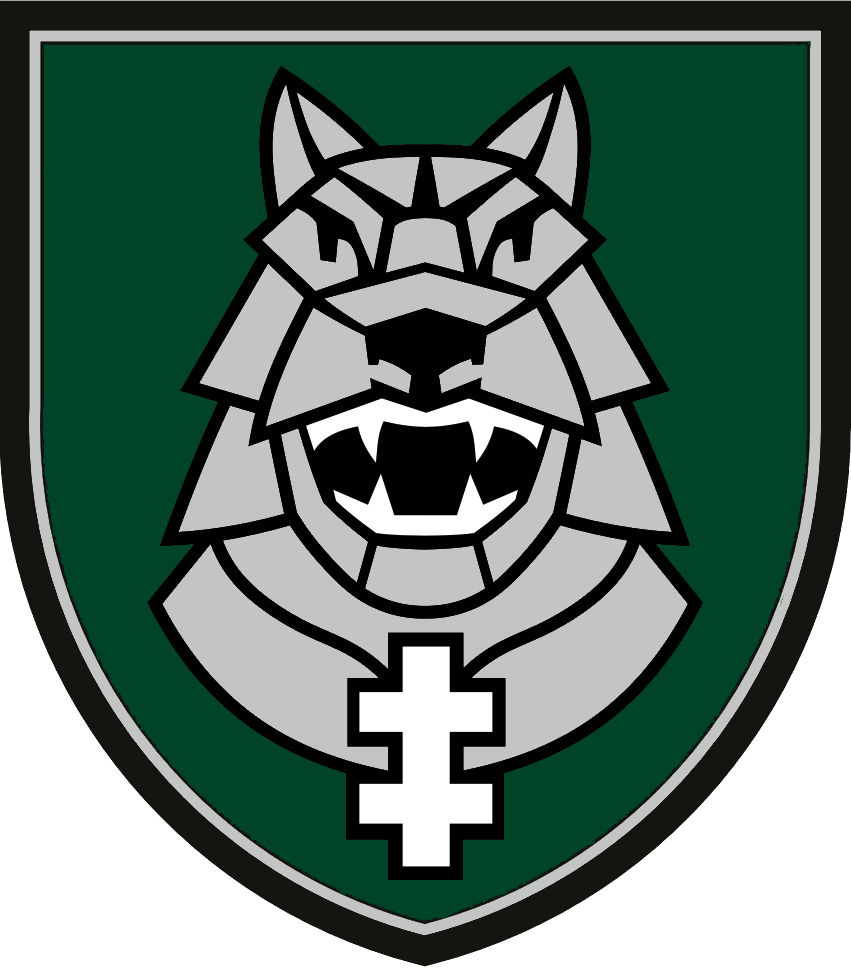
- Infantry Brigade Iron Wolf insignia
- Active: 2026 – now
- Country: Lithuania
- Branch: Lithuanian Land Forces
- Type: Tank Battalion
- Part of: Infantry Brigade Iron Wolf (1st Division)
- Garrison/HQ: Rukla

The Tank Battalion (Lithuanian: Tankų batalionas) is a unit of the Lithuanian Armed Forces, which belongs to the Infantry Brigade Iron Wolf of the Lithuanian Land Forces. Currently, the tank battalion consists of the initial command element. Its full formation is planned for 2028, when the Leopard 2A8 tanks will be received.

The battalion HQ is deployed in the Rukla village, Jonava district.

== History ==
=== Armoured Group (Šarvuočių rinktinė) ===
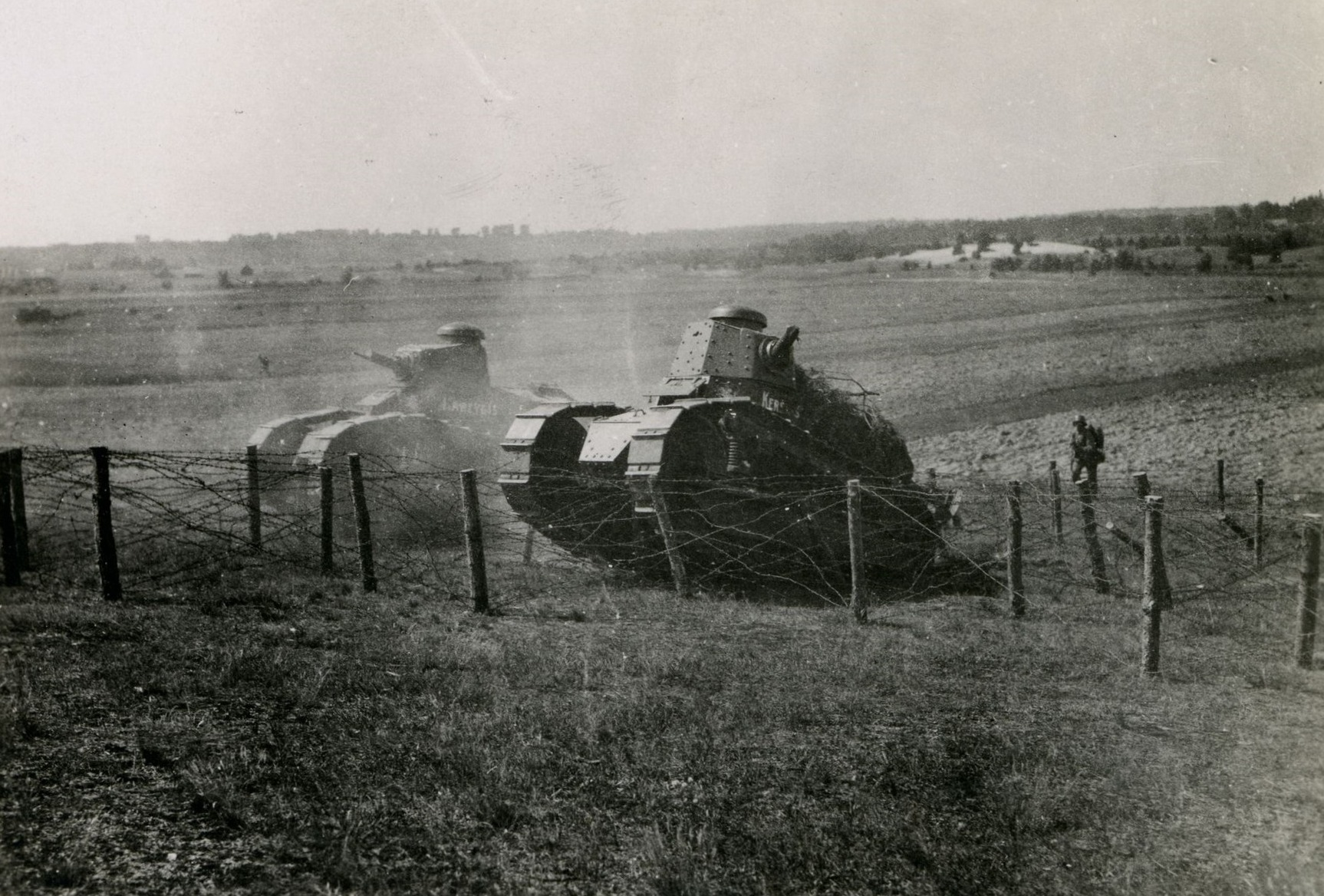
Lithuanian Renault FT-17 exercises.

The interwar Lithuanian army had the Armored Group. According to the organisation of August 1, 1935, after the armoured train company was abolished, the unit consisted of a headquarters, 3 tank and armored car (armored vehicle) companies, and a training platoon.

During the interwar period, the Lithuanian Armed Forces operated French light tanks Renault FT-17, as well as the British-made Vickers Carden Loyd tankettes M1933 and M1936.

In order to update its armored vehicles, in 1937 Lithuania commissioned the Czechoslovak company ČKD to design a special modification of the light tank LT vz. 38. The new model was named LTL-40 (Czech: lehký tank litevský). Although the ordered tanks were produced, due to the Soviet occupation of Lithuania in 1940 and the loss of independence, the country never received this equipment and it was instead used by the Slovakian Army.

=== Contemporary Lithuania ===
In the first decades of independence, the Lithuanian Armed Forces focused mainly on light infantry and wheeled armored vehicle capabilities, focusing on mobility and compatibility with its NATO partners.

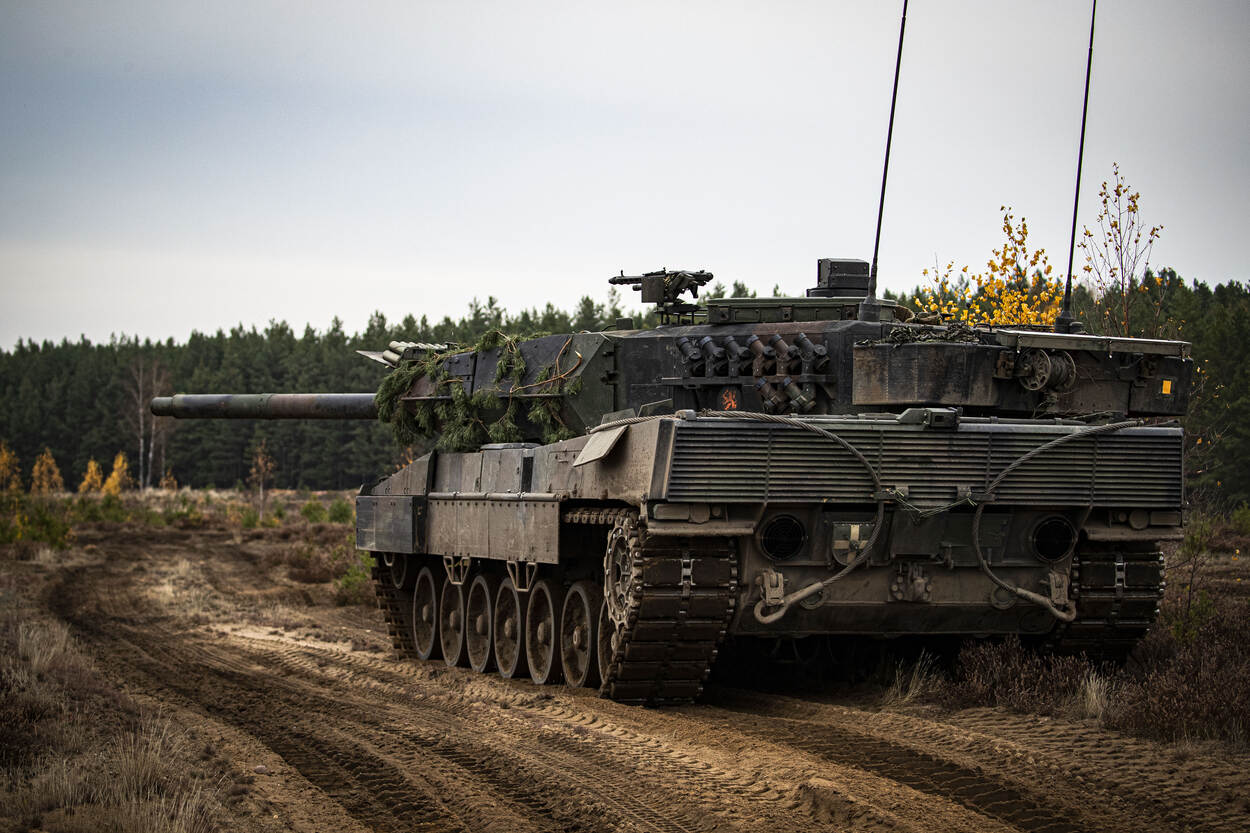
NATO Enhanced Forward Presence Battalion battle group tank Leopard 2A6MA3.

The processes related to the integration of heavy equipment intensified in 2017, when a NATO forward-deployed battalion battle group armed with Leopard 2 tanks was attached to the Infantry Brigade Iron Wolf. In order to ensure the functioning of these units, the country began to develop the infrastructure necessary for tanks. Later, when Lithuania began to form the 1st Division, this NATO battle group was transferred to the subordination of the German 45th Panzer Brigade.

On 23 January 2024, the State Defense Council announced its decision to purchase German Leopard 2A8 tanks in order to develop the Lithuanian Armed Forces' division-level capabilities. On 11 July 2024, the Seimas of the Republic of Lithuania approved changes to the permanent basic structure of the army - it was decided to reorganize the King Mindaugas Hussar Battalion into the King Mindaugas Tank Battalion.

=== Current Tank Battalion ===
Lithuanian tank crews carrying out first loading and live-fire exercises with Leopard 2 tanks.

The principle structure approved by the Seimas on June 25, 2025, provided for the establishment of a completely new tank battalion, while the hussar battalion was left among the infantry-type units.

From 2025, the process of establishing a tank battalion of the Lithuanian army began in cooperation with the German Bundeswehr. The structure of the future Lithuanian tank unit was adopted from the example of the German Army.

Lithuanian soldiers, having previously attended German language courses in the country, continue their specialist training in Germany. The German Army 's 93rd Tank Battalion (Panzerlehrbataillon 93) was chosen as the main training partner. The training program covers various levels, from the basic training of tank operators to practical combat shooting with Leopard 2A6 tanks. Tankers of the Lithuanian army trained before the creation of the Lithuanian Tank Battalion will be integrated into the units of the German Army.

By Order No. V-406 of 6 May 2026, the Minister of National Defence of the Republic of Lithuania, Robertas Kaunas, approved the structure and foundations of the future battalion. On 10 July 2026, the battalion's initial element was established.

The official inauguration of the battalion is scheduled for 2027.

== Composition ==
Planned battalion structure:

- Command Group;
- Headquarters;
- Headquarters Company;
- 1st Tank Company (Leopard 2A8);
- 2nd Tank Company (Leopard 2A8);
- 3rd Tank Company (Leopard 2A8);
- Direct Logistic Support Company.
