= Nemaitonys Eldership =

Eldership of Lithuania

The Nemaitonys Eldership (Lithuanian: Nemaitonių seniūnija) is an eldership of Lithuania, located in the Kaišiadorys District Municipality. In 2021 its population was 365.
