= Venecija =

- Village
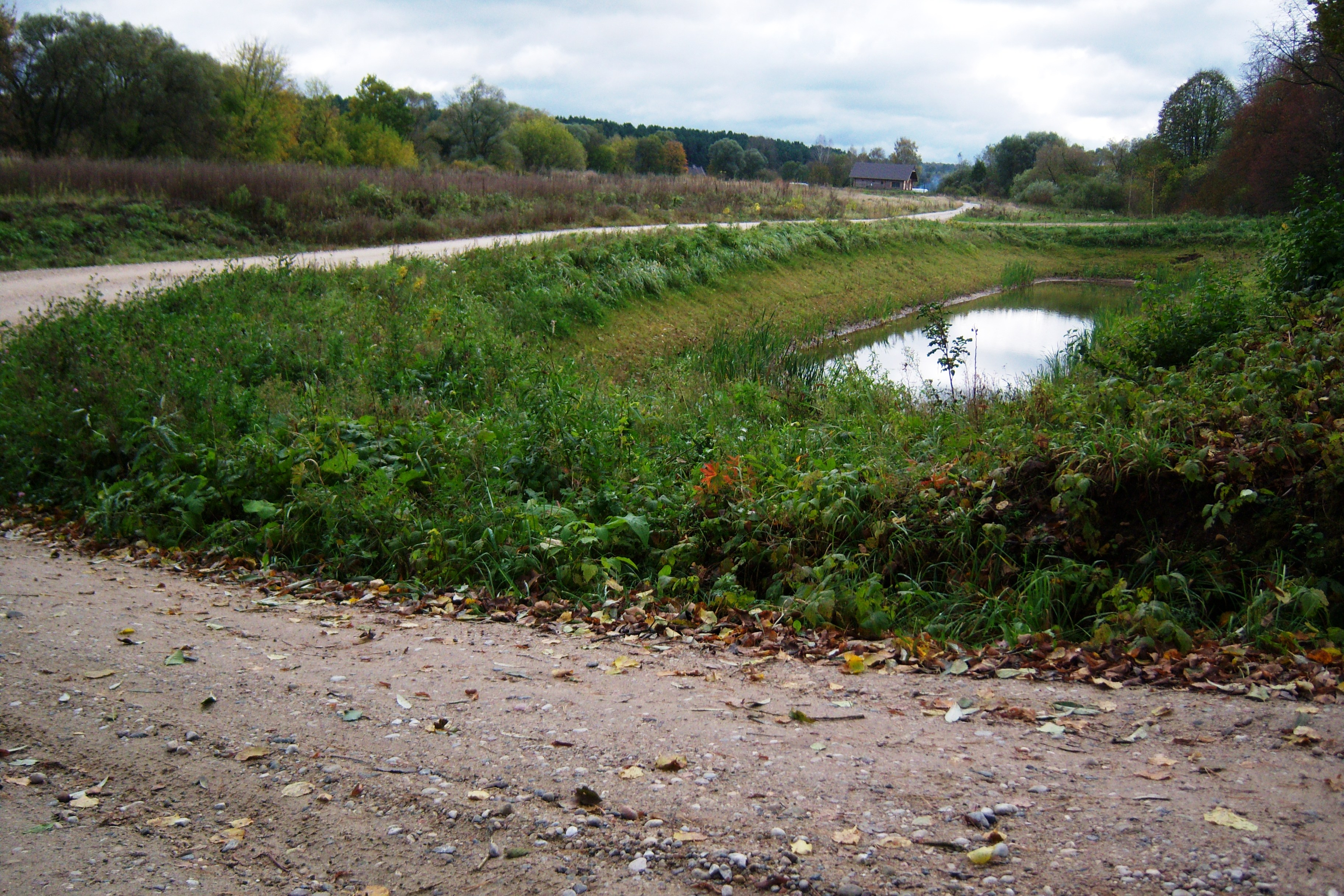

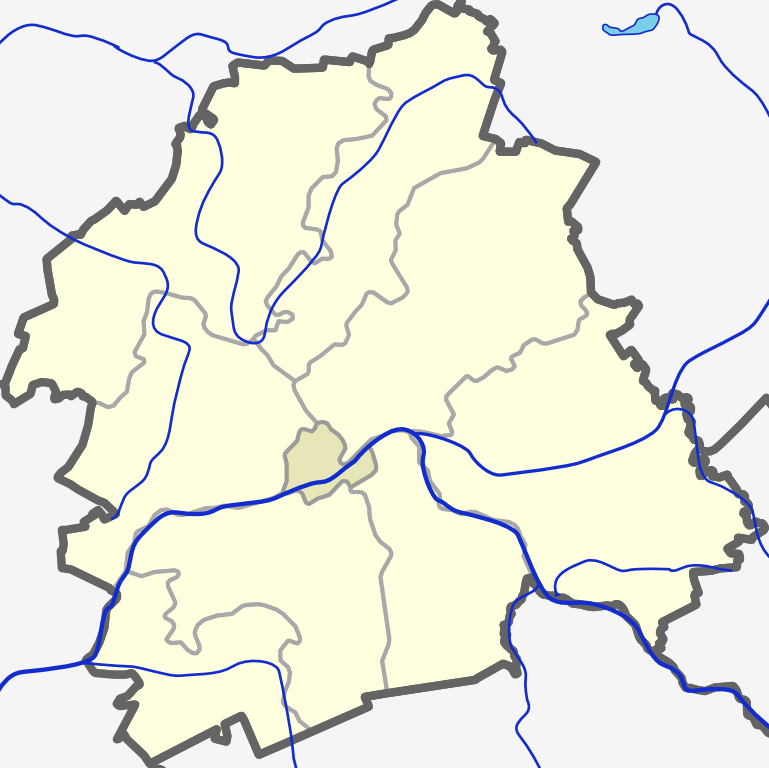
- Location in Lithuania Venecija (Lithuania)
- Coordinates: 55°03′50″N 24°22′23″E
- Country: Lithuania
- County: Kaunas County
- Municipality: Jonava district municipality
- Eldership: Rukla Eldership

Population (2011)
  - Total: 6
- Time zone: UTC+2 (EET)
  - Summer (DST): UTC+3 (EEST)

Venecija ('Venice') is a village in Jonava district municipality, in Kaunas County, in central Lithuania. According to the 2011 census, the village had a population of 6 people. It is located on a bank of Neris. Connected to road KK143 (Jonava - Elektrėnai)

== Demography ==
Historical population

Year	Pop.	±% p.a.
1923	39	—
1959	32	−0.55%
1970	29	−0.89%

Year	Pop.	±% p.a.
2001	4	−6.19%
2011	6	+4.14%

Source: 1902, 1923, 1959 & 1970, 1979, 1989, 2001, 2011
