= Rukla (village) =

- Village
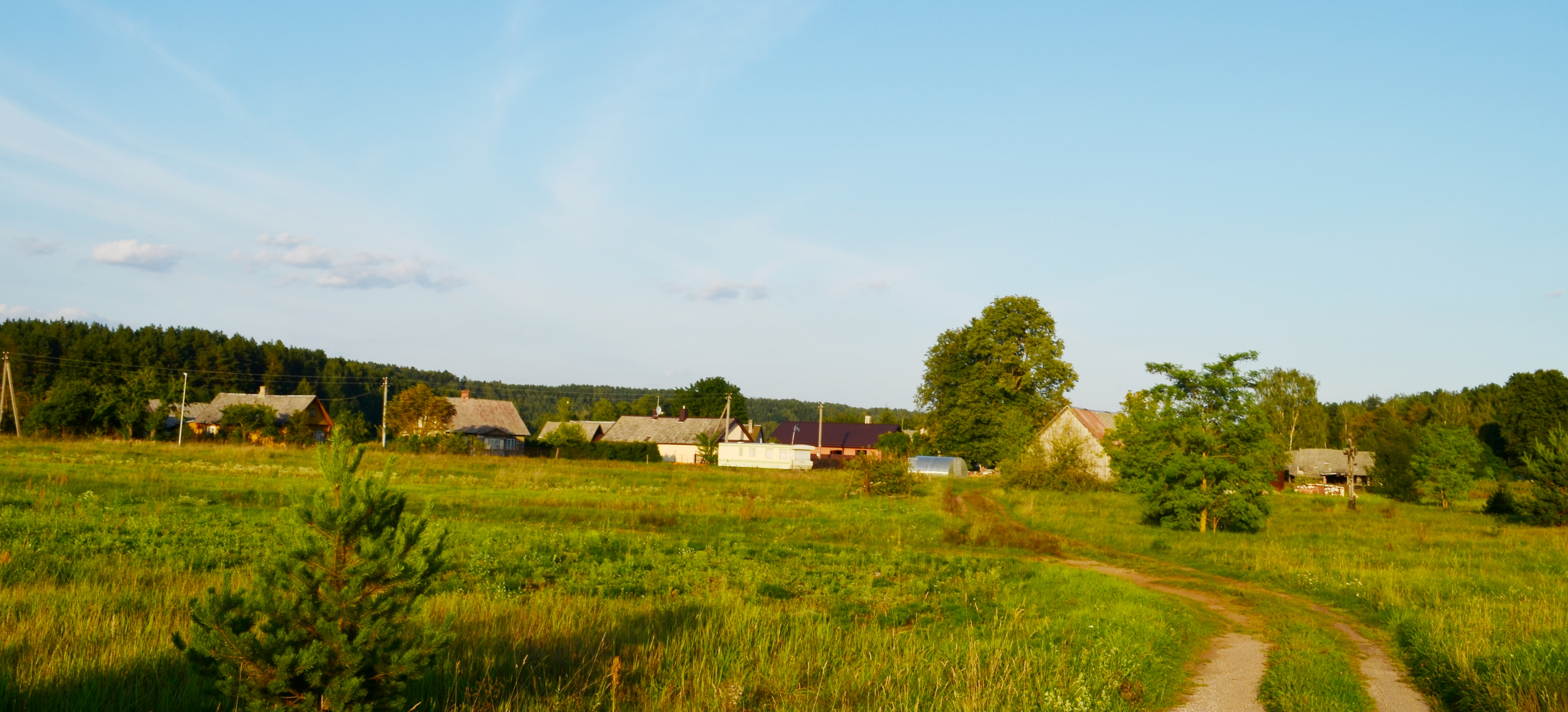

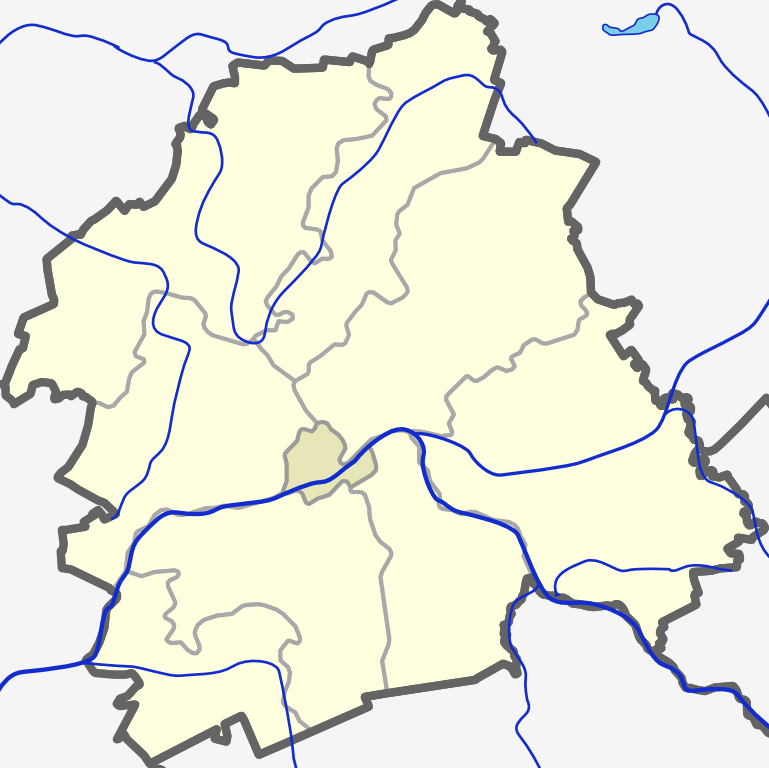
- Location in Lithuania Rukla (Lithuania)
- Coordinates: 55°03′11″N 24°23′49″E
- Country: Lithuania
- County: Kaunas County
- Municipality: Jonava district municipality
- Eldership: Rukla Eldership

Population (2011)
  - Total: 118
- Time zone: UTC+2 (EET)
  - Summer (DST): UTC+3 (EEST)

Rukla is a village in Jonava district municipality, in Kaunas County, in central Lithuania. According to the 2011 census, the village had a population of 118 people. It is located on a bank of Neris, near town Rukla. Connected to road KK143 (Jonava - Elektrėnai).

== Demography ==
Historical population
Year / Pop. / ±% p.a.; 2001 / 113 / —	Year / Pop. / ±% p.a.; 2011 / 118 / +0.43%
Source: 1902, 1923, 1959 & 1970, 1979, 1989, 2001, 2011
