= Kaišiadorys Area Eldership =

Eldership of Lithuania

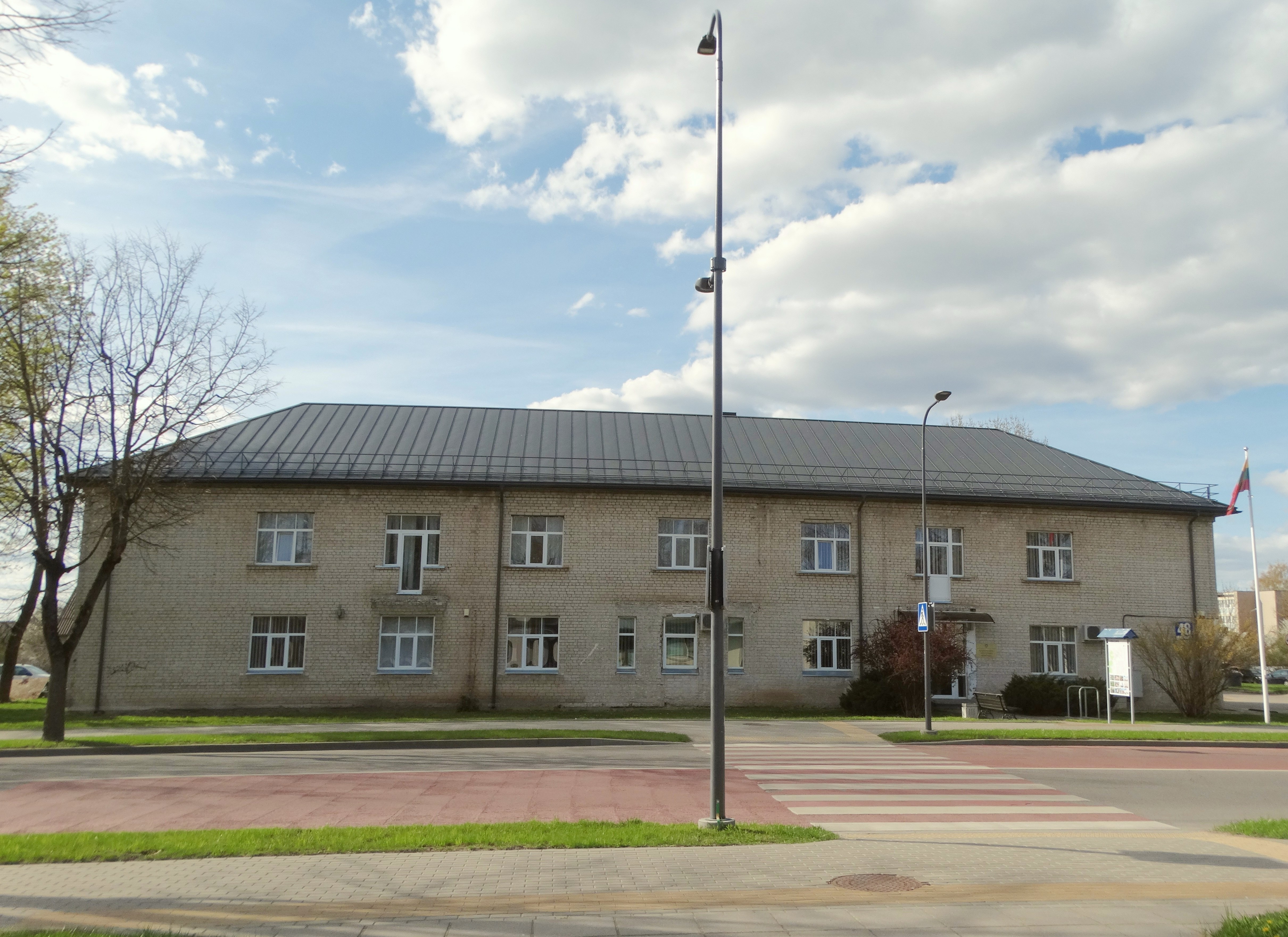
Eldership, Kaišiadorys, Lithuania

The Kaišiadorys Eldership (Lithuanian: Kaišiadorių apylinkės seniūnija) is an eldership of Lithuania, located in the Kaišiadorys District Municipality. In 2021 its population was 1890.
