= Rumšiškės Eldership =

Eldership of Lithuania

The Rumšiškės Eldership (Lithuanian: Rumšiškių seniūnija) is an eldership of Lithuania, located in the Kaišiadorys District Municipality. In 2021 its population was 3806.
