= Tartokas =

- Village
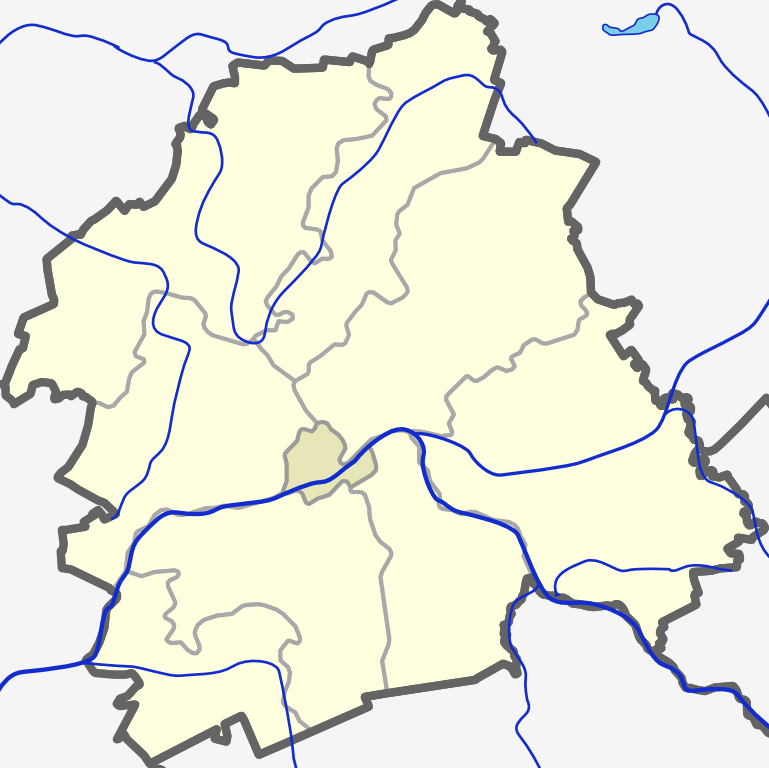
- Location in Lithuania Tartokas (Lithuania)
- Coordinates: 55°01′41″N 24°26′20″E
- Country: Lithuania
- County: Kaunas County
- Municipality: Jonava district municipality
- Eldership: Rukla Eldership

Population (2011)
  - Total: 3
- Time zone: UTC+2 (EET)
  - Summer (DST): UTC+3 (EEST)

Tartokas is a village in Jonava district municipality, in Kaunas County, in central Lithuania. According to the 2011 census, the village had a population of 6 people. It is located on a bank of Neris and Lomena rivers, next to Gaižiūnai forest and Tartokas hillfort. Connected to road KK143 (Jonava - Elektrėnai).

== Demography ==
Historical population

Year	Pop.	±% p.a.
1923	25	—
1959	26	+0.11%
1970	22	−1.51%

Year	Pop.	±% p.a.
2001	2	−7.44%
2011	3	+4.14%

Source: 1902, 1923, 1959 & 1970, 1979, 1989, 2001, 2011
