= Kruonis Eldership =

Eldership of Lithuania

The Kruonis Eldership (Lithuanian: Kruonio seniūnija) is an eldership of Lithuania, located in the Kaišiadorys District Municipality. In 2021 its population was 2295.
