= Kamšalai =

- Village
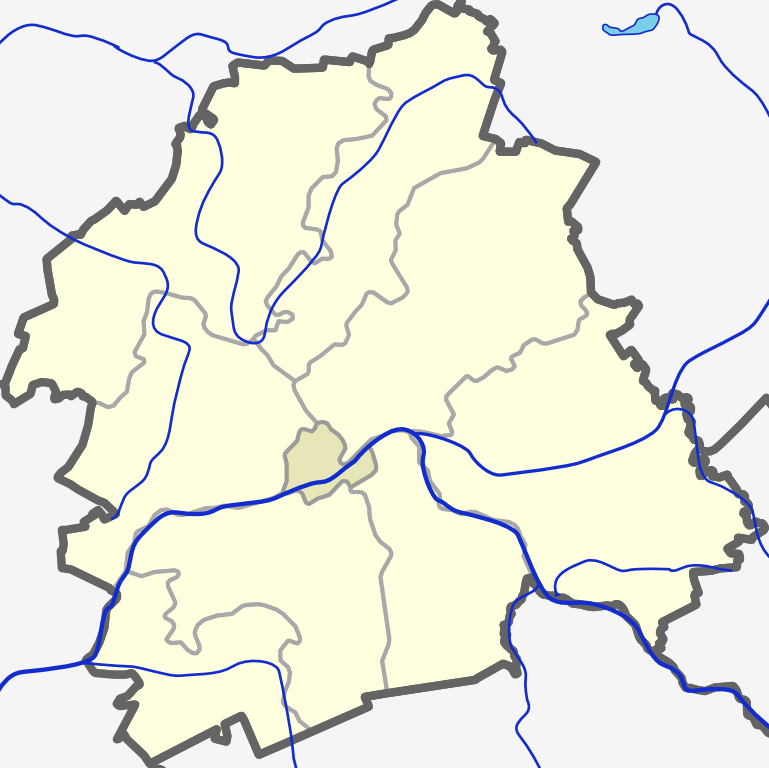
- Location in Lithuania Kamšalai (Lithuania)
- Coordinates: 55°04′01″N 24°19′52″E
- Country: Lithuania
- County: Kaunas County
- Municipality: Jonava district municipality
- Eldership: Rukla Eldership

Population (2011)
  - Total: 0
- Time zone: UTC+2 (EET)
  - Summer (DST): UTC+3 (EEST)

Kamšalai is a village in Jonava district municipality, in Kaunas County, in central Lithuania. According to the 2011 census, the village had no population.

== Demography ==
Historical population

Year	Pop.	±% p.a.
1923	46	—
1959	31	−1.09%
1970	35	+1.11%

Year	Pop.	±% p.a.
2001	1	−10.84%
2011	0	−100.00%

Source: 1902, 1923, 1959 & 1970, 1979, 1989, 2001, 2011
