= Konstantinava =

- Village
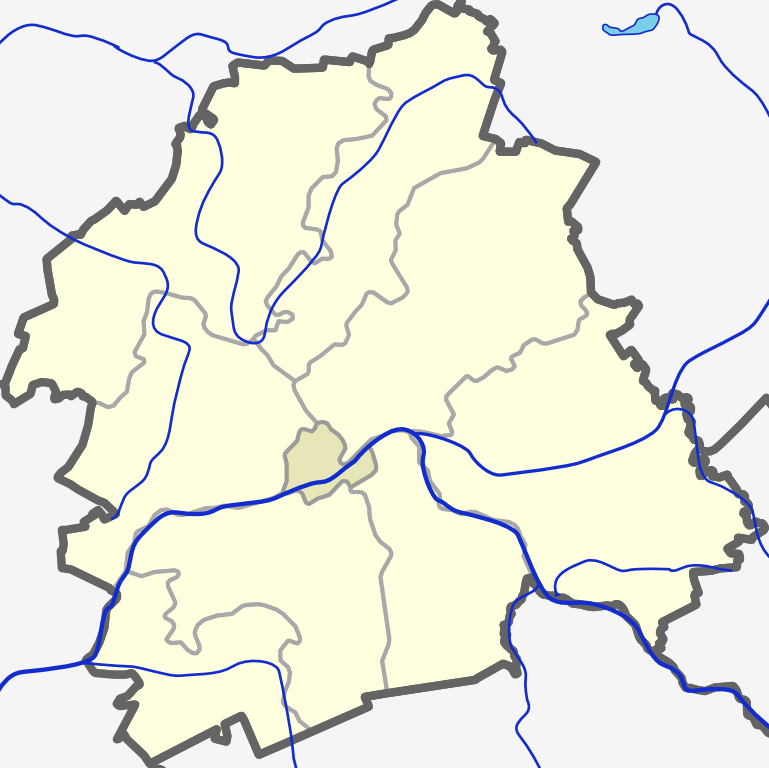
- Location in Lithuania Konstantinava (Lithuania)
- Coordinates: 55°03′40″N 24°19′52″E
- Country: Lithuania
- County: Kaunas County
- Municipality: Jonava district municipality
- Eldership: Rukla Eldership

Population (2011)
  - Total: 1
- Time zone: UTC+2 (EET)
  - Summer (DST): UTC+3 (EEST)

Konstantinava is a village in Jonava district municipality, in Kaunas County, in central Lithuania. According to the 2011 census, the village had a population of 1.

== Demography ==
Historical population

| Year | Pop. | ±% p.a. |
|---|---|---|
| 1923 | 21 | — |
| 1959 | 37 | +1.59% |
| 1970 | 28 | −2.50% |

| Year | Pop. | ±% p.a. |
|---|---|---|
| 2001 | 6 | −4.85% |
| 2011 | 1 | −16.40% |

Source: 1902, 1923, 1959 & 1970, 1979, 1989, 2001, 2011
