= Jonalaukis =

- Village
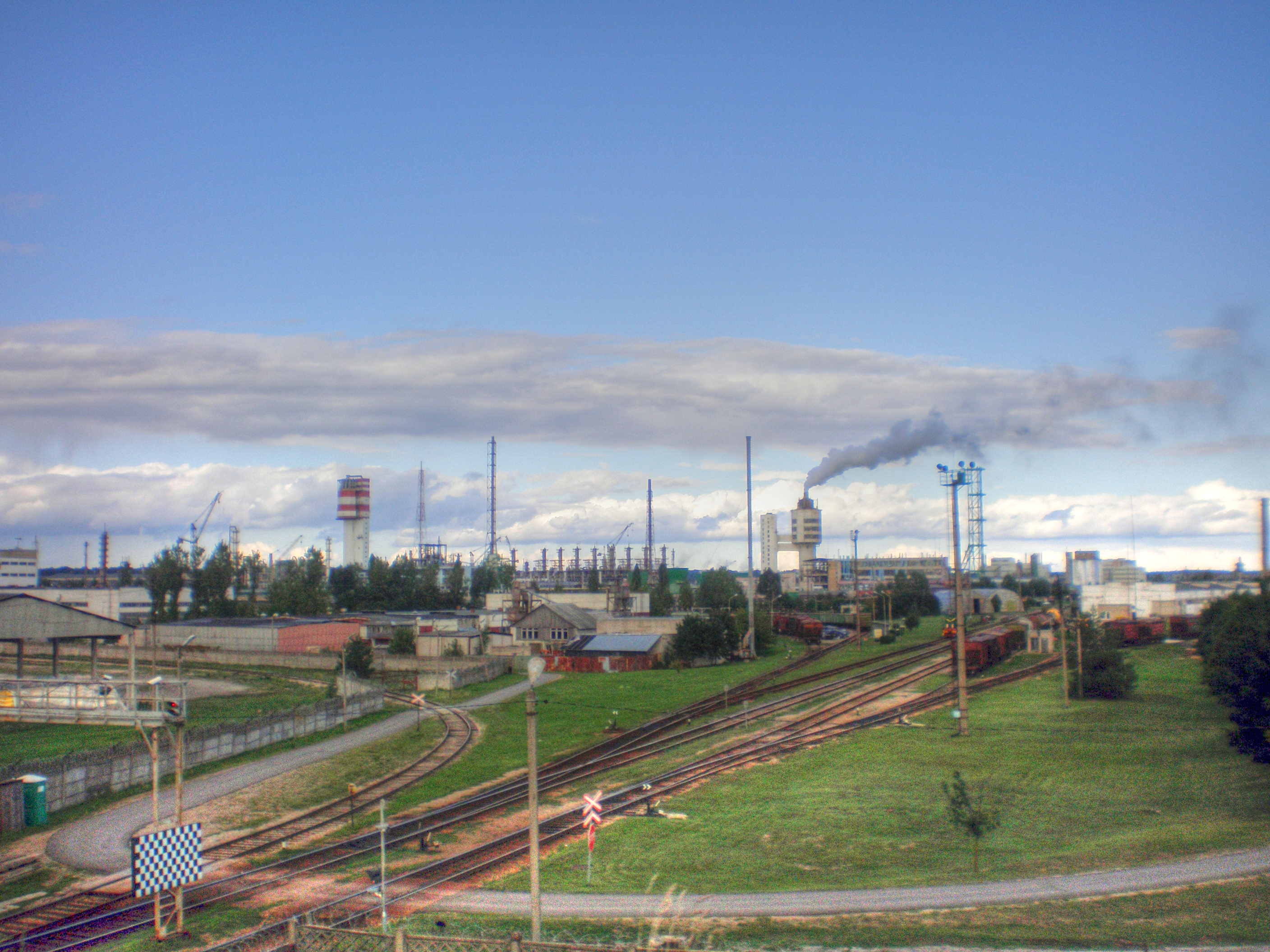

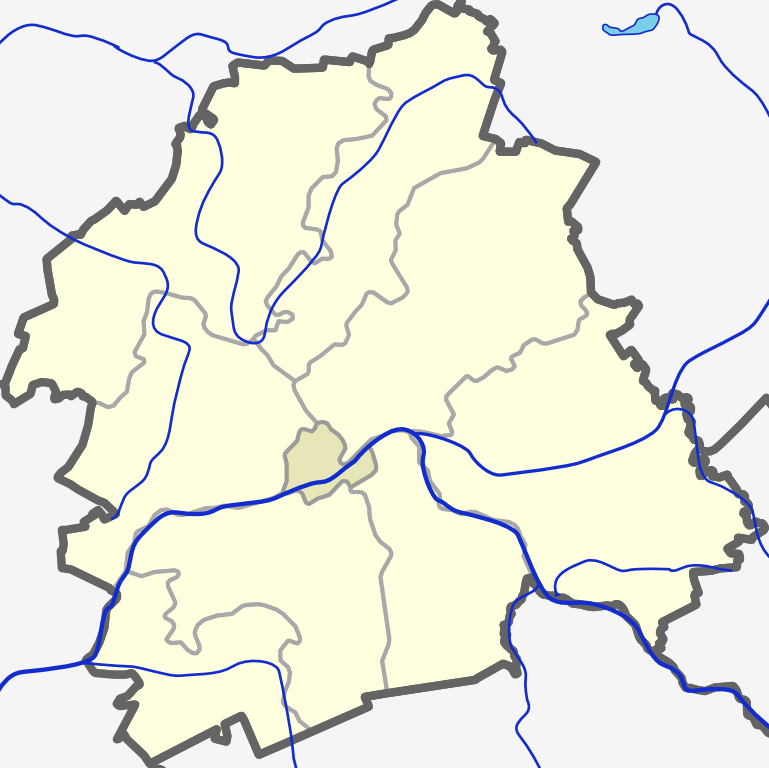
- Location in Lithuania Jonalaukis (Lithuania)
- Coordinates: 55°03′50″N 24°22′23″E
- Country: Lithuania
- County: Kaunas County
- Municipality: Jonava district municipality
- Eldership: Rukla Eldership

Population (2011)
  - Total: 6
- Time zone: UTC+2 (EET)
  - Summer (DST): UTC+3 (EEST)

Jonalaukis is a village in Jonava district municipality, in Kaunas County, in central Lithuania. According to the 2011 census, the village had a population of 6 people. The village is also home to many industrious companies, the biggest being Achema.

== Demography ==
Historical population

| Year | Pop. | ±% p.a. |
|---|---|---|
| 1959 | 115 | — |
| 1970 | 87 | −2.50% |

| Year | Pop. | ±% p.a. |
|---|---|---|
| 2001 | 7 | −7.81% |
| 2011 | 6 | −1.53% |

Source: 1902, 1923, 1959 & 1970, 1979, 1989, 2001, 2011
