= Palomenė Eldership =

Eldership of Lithuania

The Palomenė Eldership (Lithuanian: Palomenės seniūnija) is an eldership of Lithuania, located in the Kaišiadorys District Municipality. In 2021 its population was 1606.
