= Lomena =

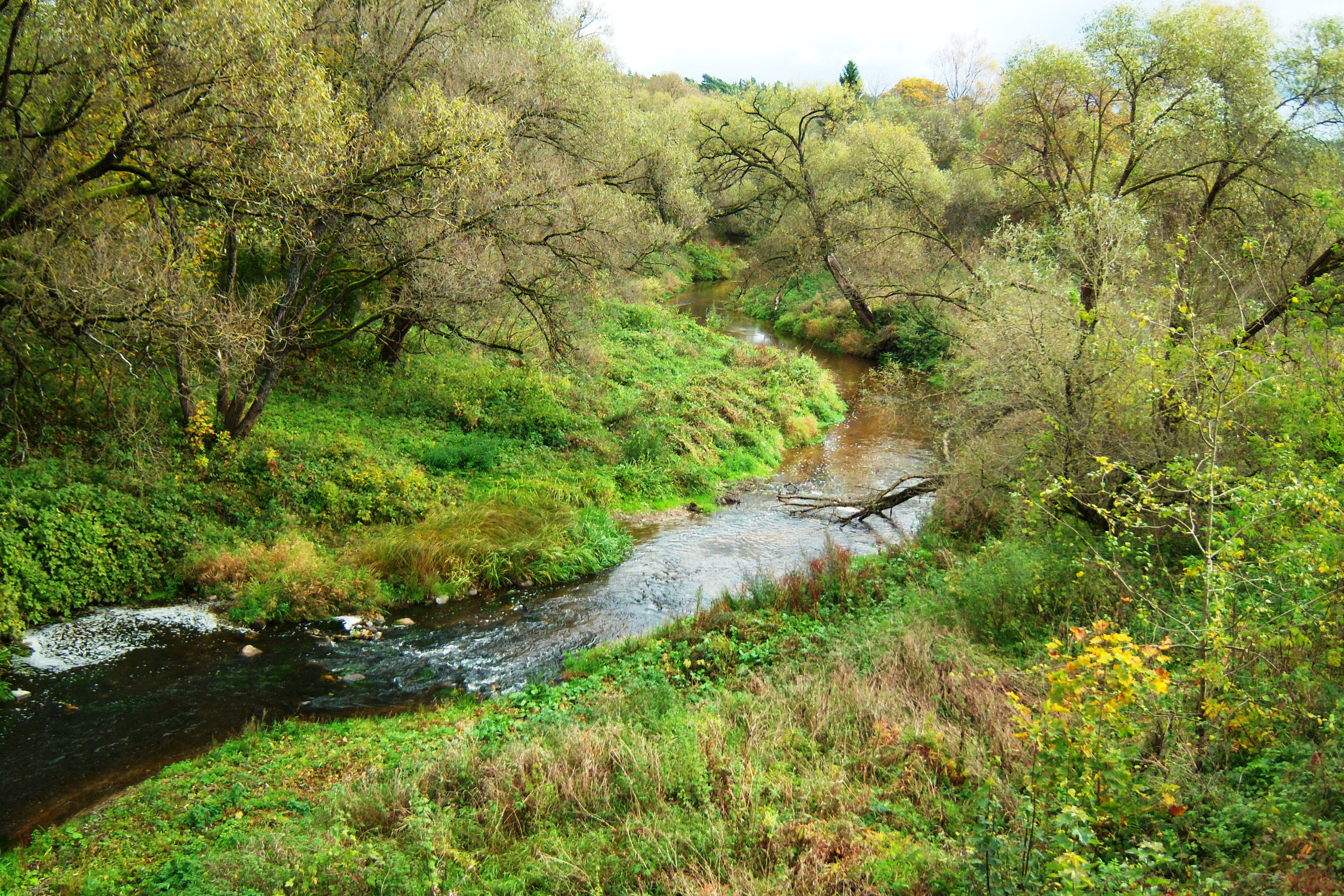

Location
- Country: Lithuania

Physical characteristics
- Source
  - location: Vladikiškės surroundings
- Mouth: Neris in Tartokas
  - coordinates: 55°01′33″N 24°27′09″E
- Length: 32 km (20 mi)
- Basin size: 186.9 km^{2} (72.2 sq mi)
- Discharge
  - average: 1.18 m³/s

Basin features
- Progression: Neris→ Neman→ Baltic Sea
- Tributaries
  - left: Dumsė, Romatas, Živinta, Bistryčia, Verkstinė
  - right: Žasla, Rudija, Uterna, Taurė, Vertimas, Nota, Neprėkšta

The Lomena is a river in Lithuania, constituting a left tributary of the Neris. It starts in Vladikiškės, Kaišiadorys District Municipality and ends in Tartokas, Jonava District Municipality, Lithuania.

The 32-km long Lomena passes through Stasiūnai, Gudiena, Kaišiadorys, Palomenė, Bagdoniškės, Lomeniai, Tartokas settlements. The river's lower course is protected by the Lomena Landscape Sanctuary.

The hydronym Lomena derives from Lithuanian word loma ('trough, depression, valley') although its older attested form, written in Polish as Łowmiana could suggest that it may derive from the word laumė ('a mythical being').
