= State Defence Council (Lithuania) =

The State Defence Council (Lithuanian: Valstybės gynimo taryba, VGT) is an institution that considers and coordinates the most important issues of Lithuanian Armed Forces, as provided for in Article 140 of the Constitution of Lithuania. The council determines the activities of institutions on the most important issues of ensuring security and defence. The council meetings are held at the Presidential Palace, Vilnius. The activities of the council are regulated by a special law on the VGT. None of the members of the council may delegate their powers to other persons.

== Meetings ==
Regular meetings of the council (usually monthly) are called and their agenda is approved by the president. All members of the council have the right to submit questions for consideration. Extraordinary meetings of the council are called by the president at his own request or at least at the request of one member of the council. Meeting topics can include and have in the past included discussions on vehicle acquisition, and Lithuanian participation in foreign military operations.

== Composition ==
=== Permanent members ===
- President of Lithuania
- Prime Minister of Lithuania
- Speaker of the Seimas
- Minister of National Defense
- Chief of Defence

=== Invitations ===
The following are usually invited to council meetings:

- Chairman of the Seimas Committee on National Security and Defence
- Director of the State Security Department of Lithuania
- Minister of Internal Affairs

The president may also invite other people to meetings.

== See also ==
- National Defence Council (Estonia)
