= Achema =

Fertilizer company

Coordinates: 55°5′7″N 24°19′50″E

Achema, AB

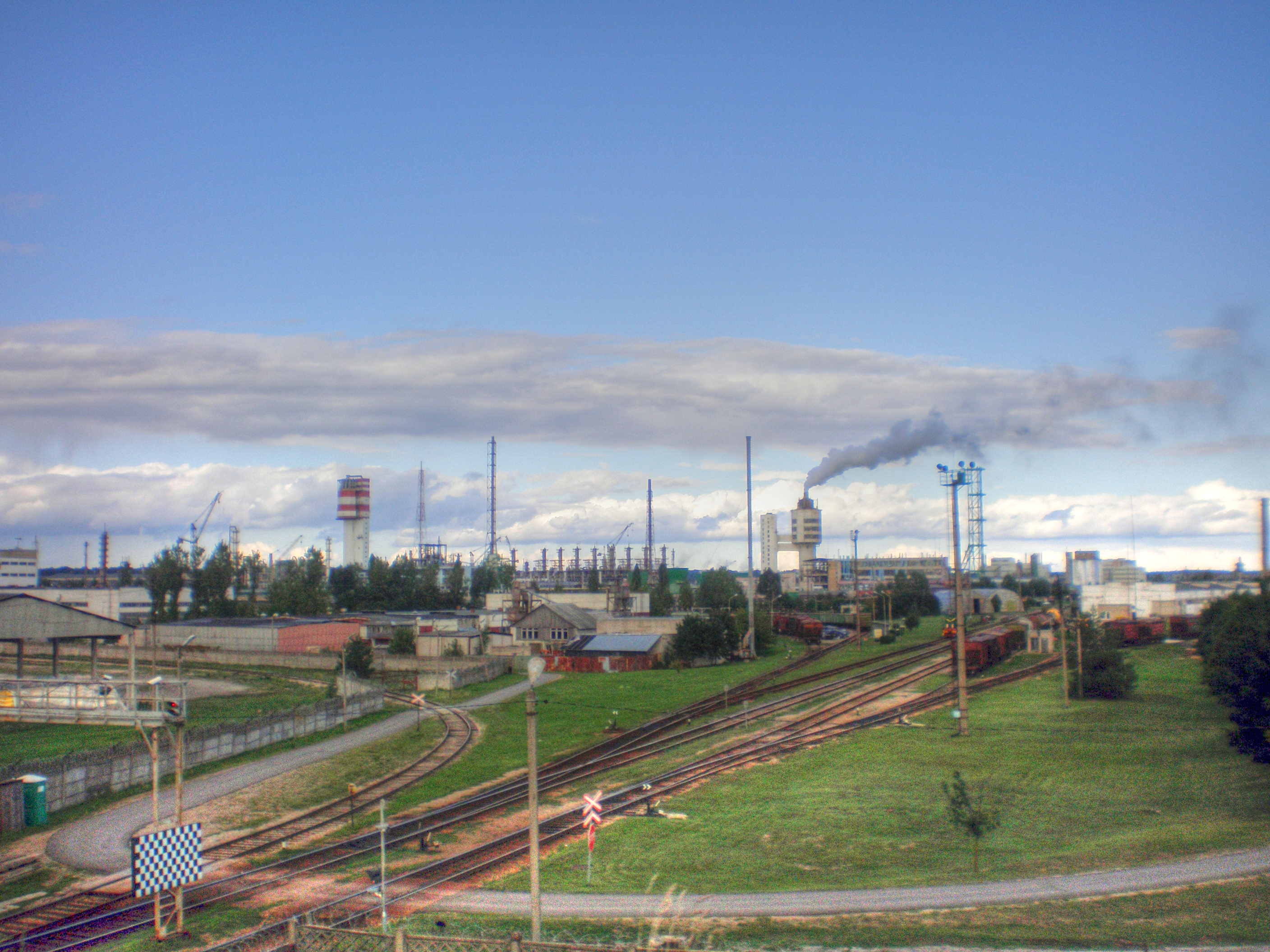
- Achema factory
- Trade name: Achema
- Native name: AB "Achema"
- Industry: Fertilizers
- Founded: 1962
- Headquarters: Jonava, Lithuania
- Key people: Ramūnas Miliauskas CEO
- Revenue: €937 million (2022)
- Number of employees: 1,143 (2024)
- Parent: Achemos grupė
- Website: www.achema.lt

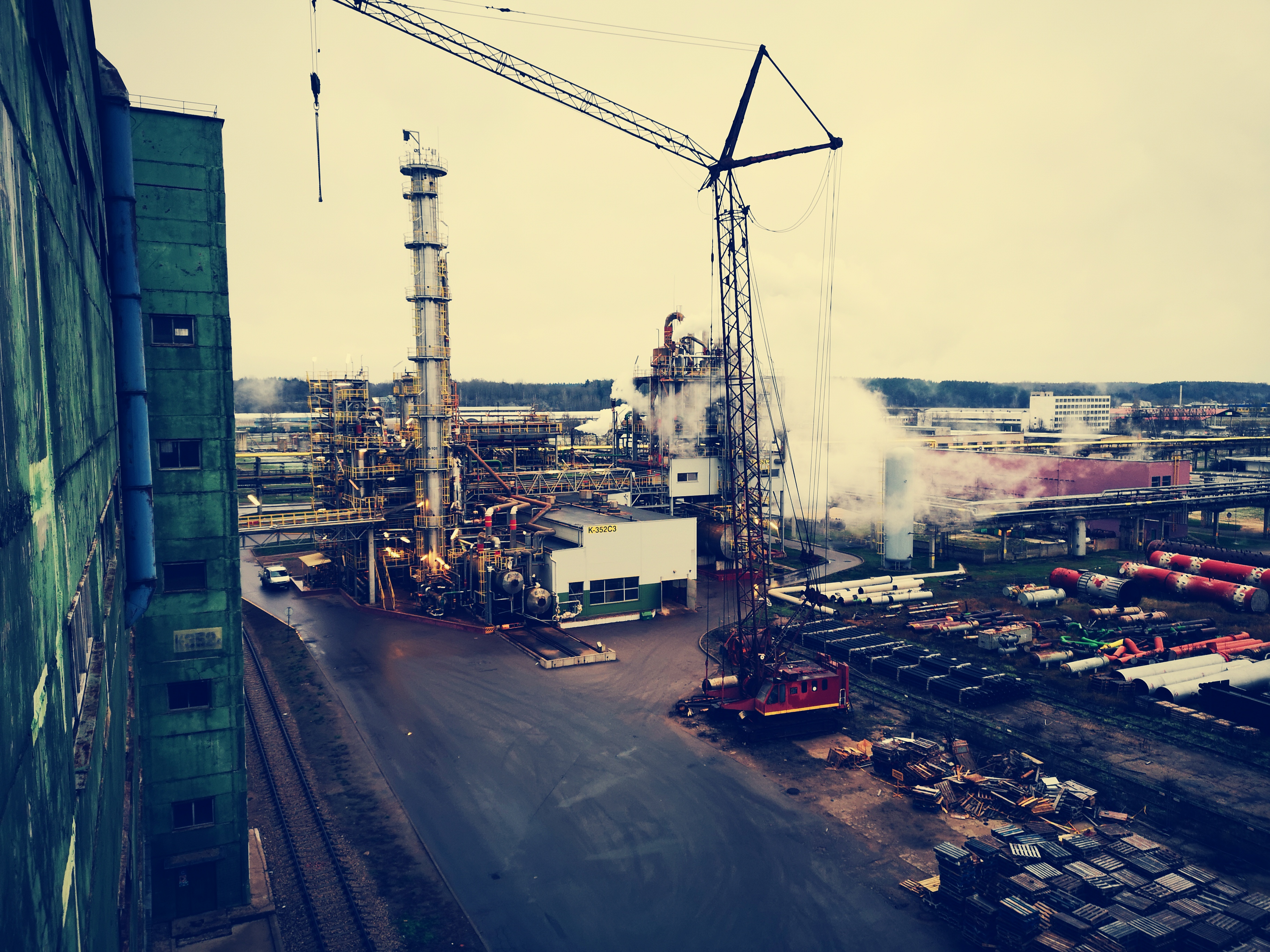
Industrial objects of Achema

Achema is the largest fertilizer producer in the Baltic states. It is headquartered in Jonava, central Lithuania. Its factory is located in the village of Jonalaukis by Jonava, near the confluence of rivers Neris and Šventoji. In 2011, Achema employed about 1700 workers and reached 2.2 billion Litas revenues (about 640 million Euros), net profit was 96.3 million Litas (27.9 million Euros).

It belongs to the business group Achemos grupė.

As of 2022, the Achema plant in Jonava was the largest natural gas consumer in Lithuania. The plant is supplied via Minsk–Kaliningrad Interconnection link to Jonava.

== History ==
The factory construction began in 1962 as one of the state-owned enterprises, called "Azotas". It became a member of the International Fertilizer Industry Association in 1989. In 1999, production of aluminum sulfate solution began. In 2011, AB "Achema" completed the creation of a network of cogeneration power plants – a cogeneration type 47 MW gas power plant was put into operation in the autumn.

=== Plant operation in the conditions of high gas price ===
In 2021 it scaled down its operations, leaving only ammonia production, due to gas price spike. The production was suspended in September 2022, due to high costs for natural gas, which was announced to be a temporary measure in August 2022.

It was resumed in early November, but halted again in December, with plans to resume operations in February.

In 2022 the revenue was 937.2 million euros, which was 58.8% higher than 2021, but the profit dropped by nearly a third, to 36.1 million euros. Due to sanctions related to the Russian invasion of Ukraine, the company switched natural gas suppliers from Russia to Norway, the US, Great Britain, Poland and Germany.

== Accidents ==
Over time there have been a number of accidents.

=== 1989 environmental disaster ===
On 20 March 1989, a rupture of the liquid ammonia tank occurred at the chemical fertilizer factory, causing a leakage of nearly 7,500 tonnes of ammonia (lt:1989 m. kovo 20 d. G/S „Azotas“ avarija). The catastrophe further developed into a fire at the storehouses of NPK 11-11-11 (nitrophoska: nitrogen + phosphate + kalium ) and other fertilizers polluting the atmosphere with products of their decomposition: nitrous oxide, chlorine gas, etc. The toxic cloud moved towards Ukmergė, Širvintos, Kėdainiai. The concentration of ammonia surpassed the permissible level 150 times in Upninkai, located 10 km from the enterprise. One day after the accident, a toxic cloud 7 km wide and 50 km long was recorded between Jonava and Kėdainiai. Seven people died during the fire and leakage of ammonia, 29 became handicapped, and more people suffered from acute respiratory and cardiac arrest.
