= KK143 =

Road in Lithuania

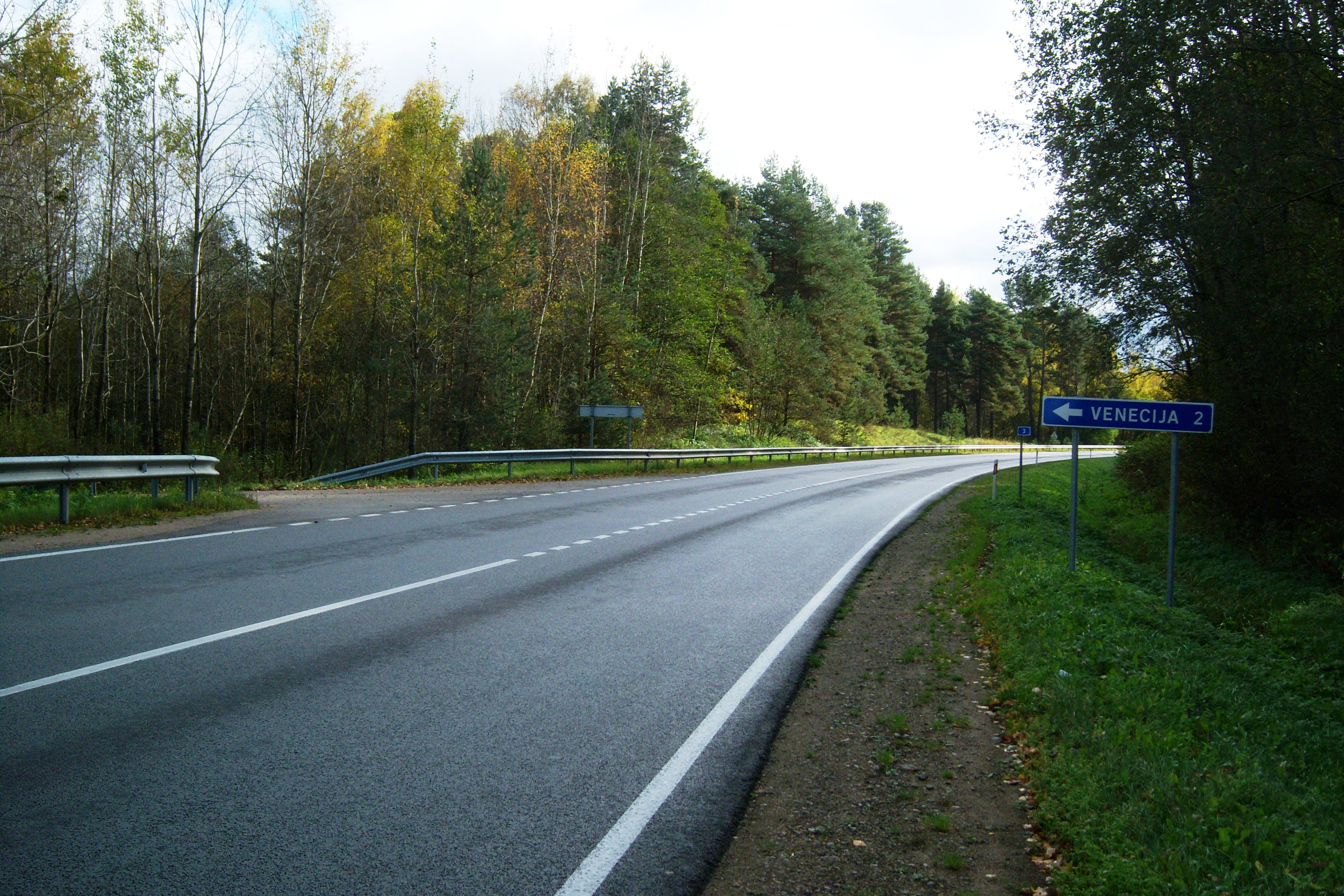

Route information
- Length: 45.82 km (28.47 mi)

Major junctions
- From: Jonava
- To: Kloniniai Mijaugonys

Location
- Country: Lithuania
- Major cities: Jonava

Highway system
- Transport in Lithuania

The KK143 is a highway in Lithuania (Krašto kelias). The length of the road is 45.82 km.

The road starts in Jonava at junction of A6 highway and European route E262. Route goes through three municipalities: Jonava District Municipality, Elektrėnai Municipality, Kaišiadorys District Municipality. Main settlements linked to the road are Jonava, Rukla, Zūbiškės, Stabintiškės, Žasliai. Ends in Kloniniai Mijaugonys, where road connects to A1 highway.
