= Rukla =

- Town
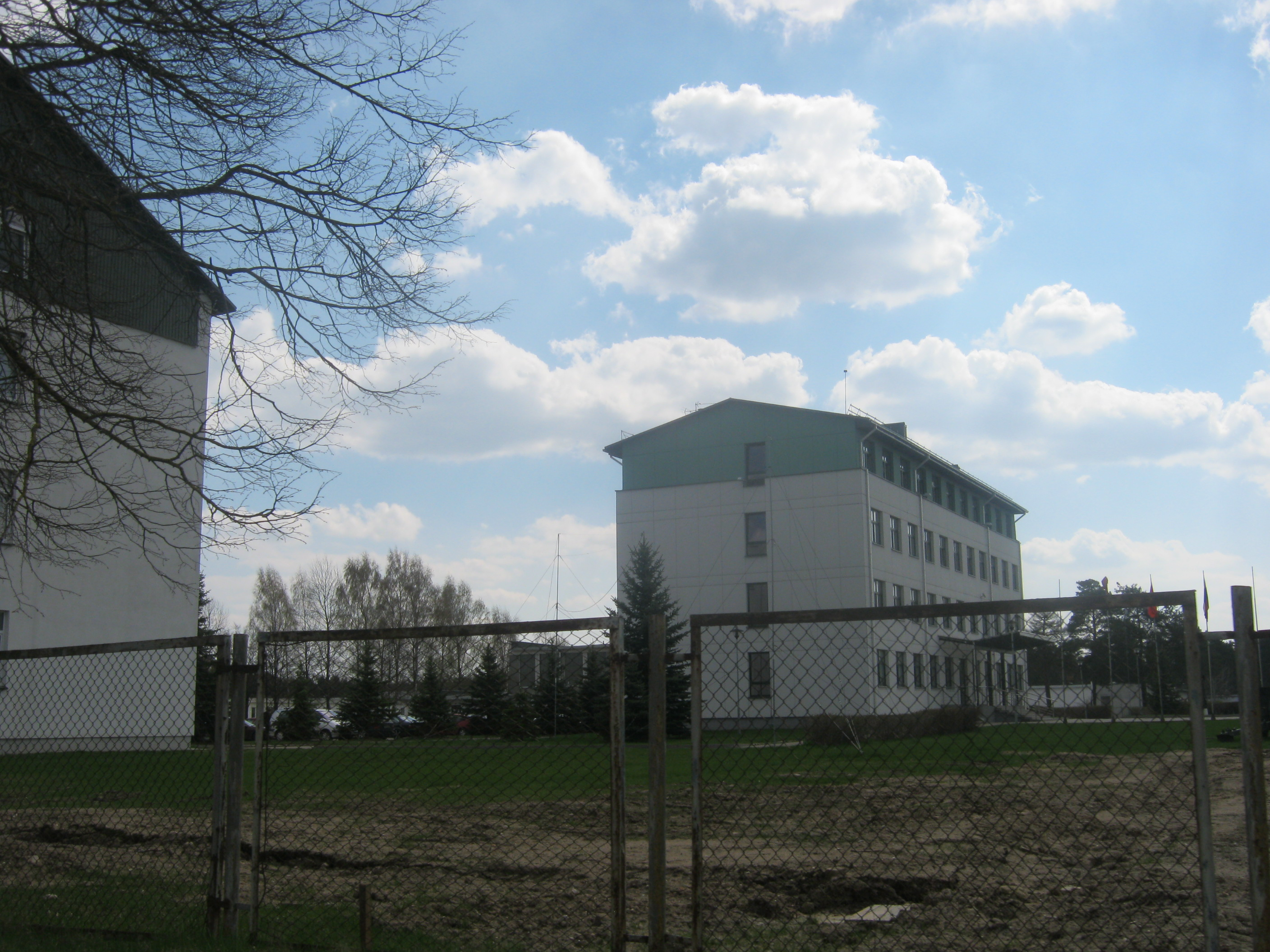

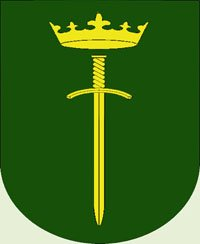
- Coat of arms

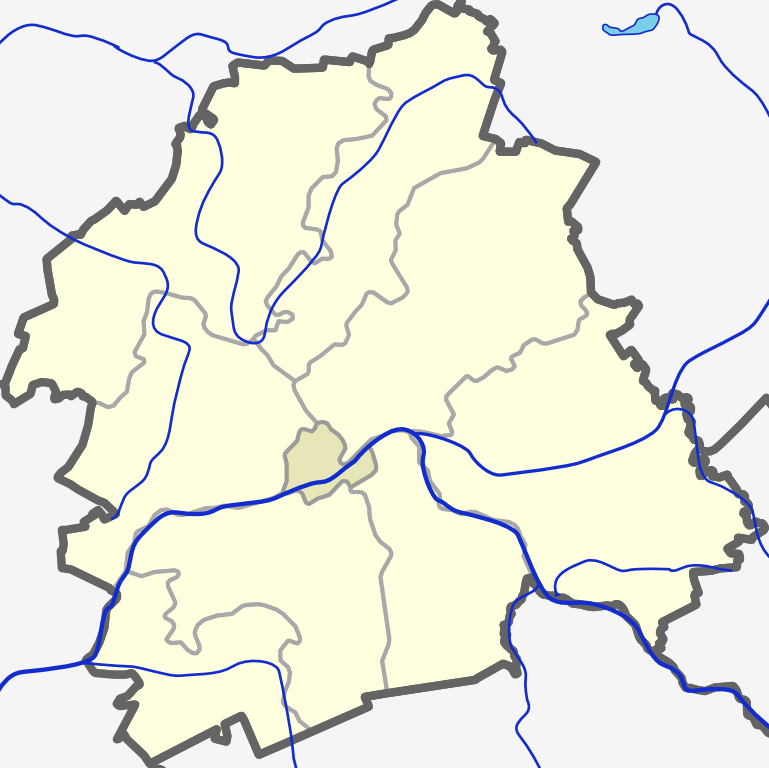
- Location in Lithuania Rukla (Lithuania)
- Coordinates: 55°03′10″N 24°22′40″E
- Country: Lithuania
- Ethnographic region: Aukštaitija
- County: Kaunas County
- Municipality: Jonava district municipality
- Eldership: Rukla Eldership

Population (2021)
  - Total: 1,987
- Time zone: UTC+2 (EET)
  - Summer (DST): UTC+3 (EEST)

Rukla is a small town in Kaunas County in central Lithuania. In 2011 it had a population of 2,098. Administrative centre of Rukla Eldership.

The national Refugee Reception Centre hosts all refugees coming to the country.

== Military base ==
Five different units of the Lithuanian Armed Forces are based in Rukla. Military facilities include the Gaižiūnai military training ground (12,500 ha) and Jonava Air Base. Since 2017, Rukla hosts the NATO Enhanced Forward Presence.

== Demographics ==
Historical population

Year	Pop.	±% p.a.
1923	92	—
1959	501	+4.82%
1970	133	−11.36%

Year	Pop.	±% p.a.
2001	2,376	+9.75%
2011	2,098	−1.24%

Source: 1902, 1923, 1959 & 1970, 1979, 1989, 2001, 2011

== Gallery ==
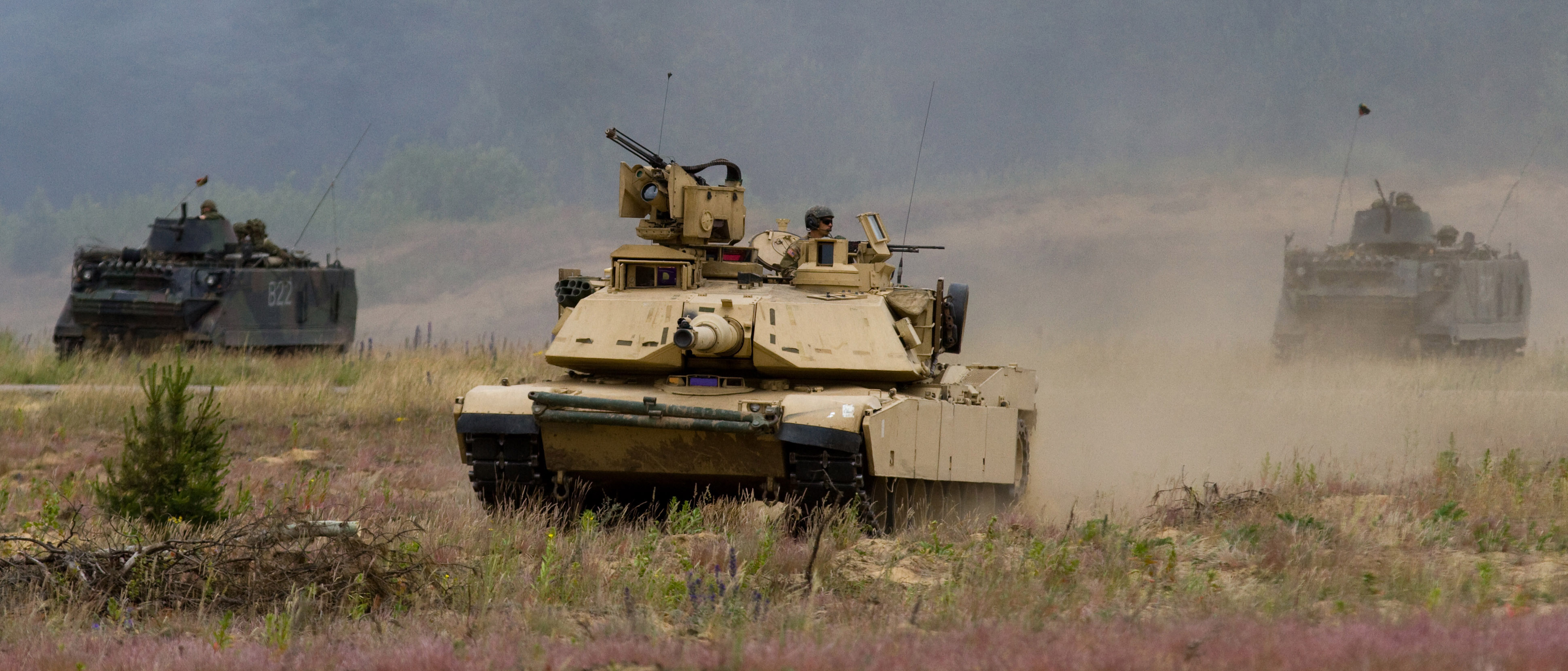
US M1 Abrams tank in the Gaižiūnai military training ground

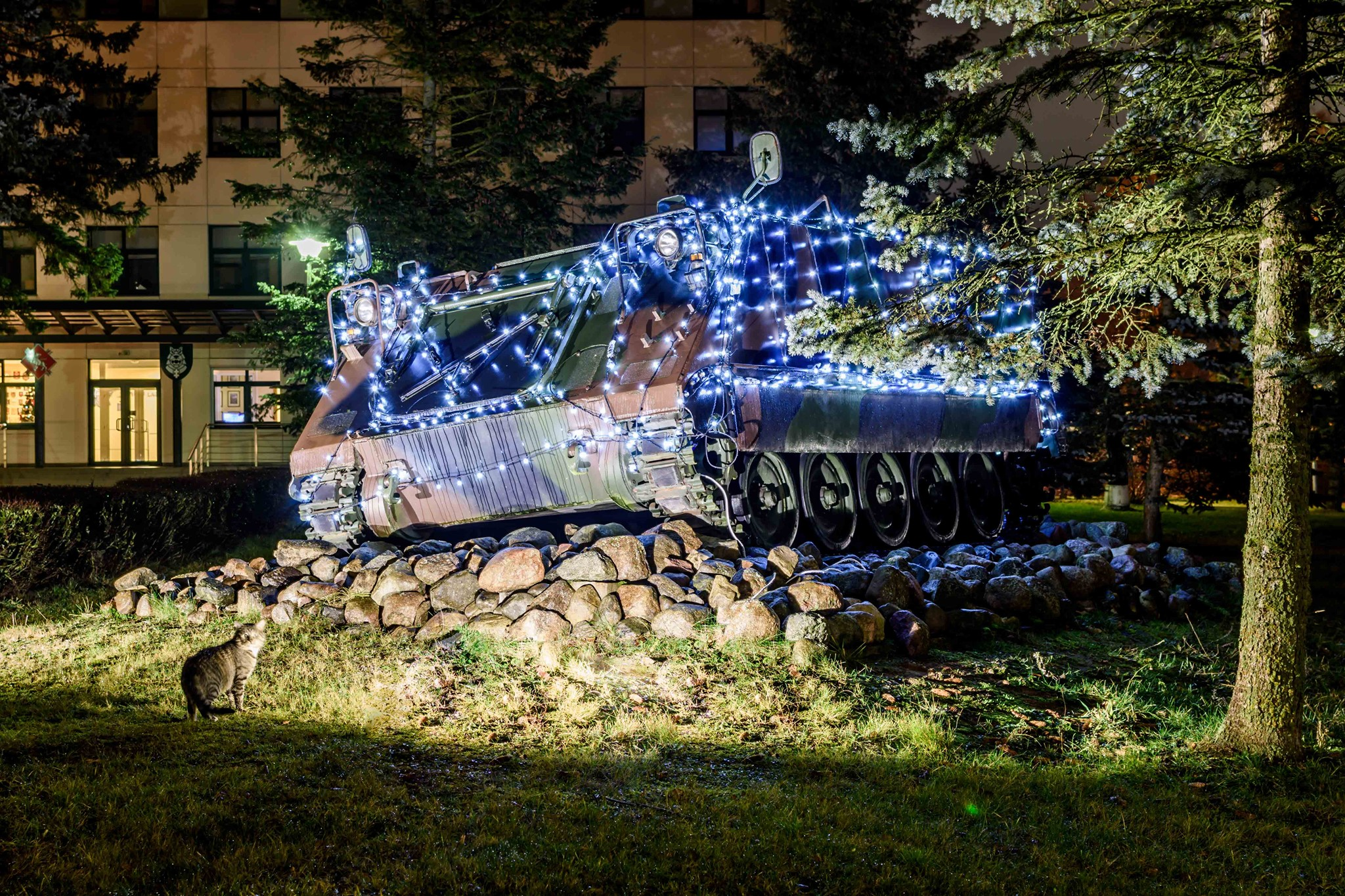
M113 garrison monument of Iron Wolf brigade in Rukla, Lithuania

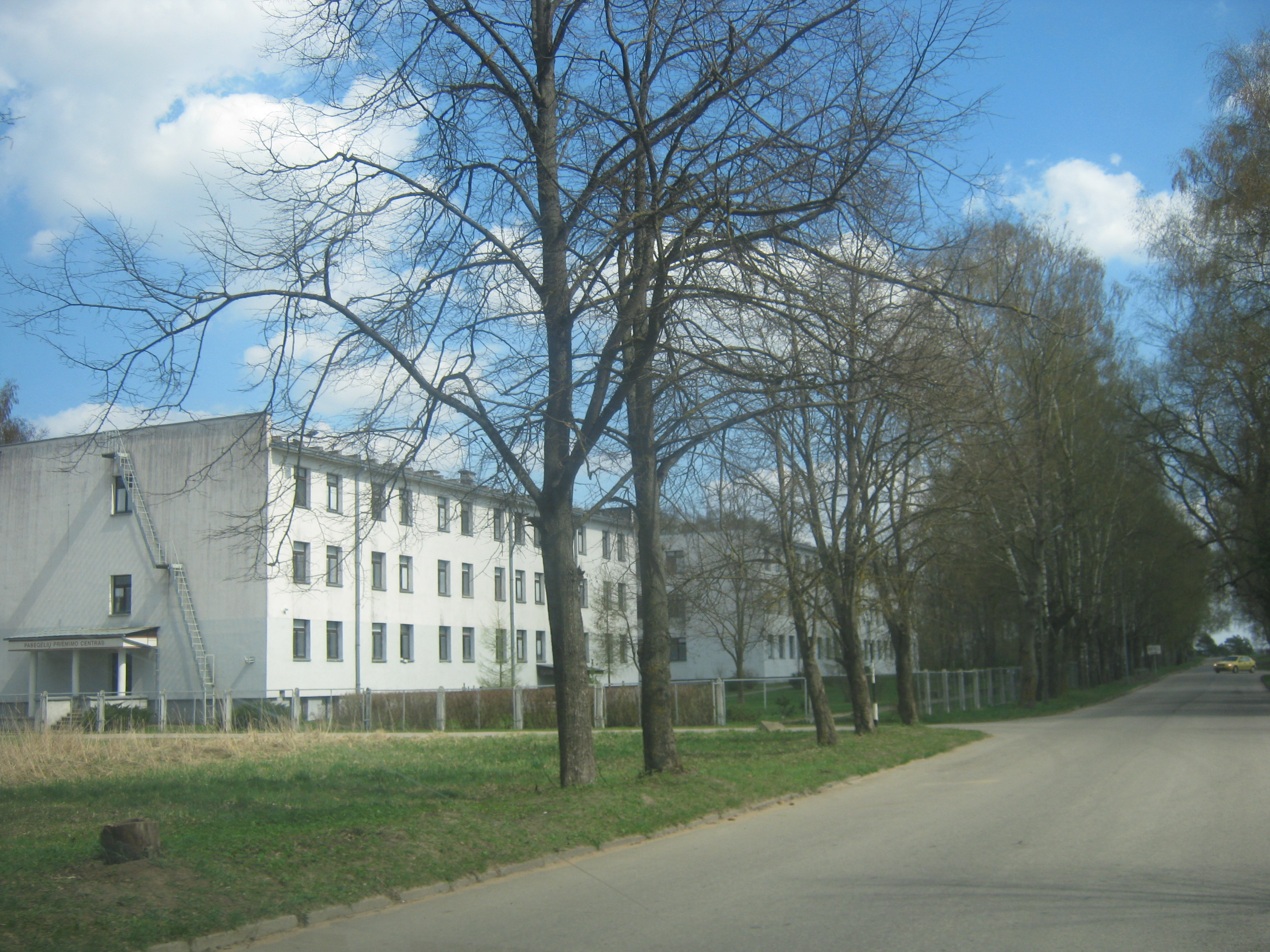
Refugees Reception Center

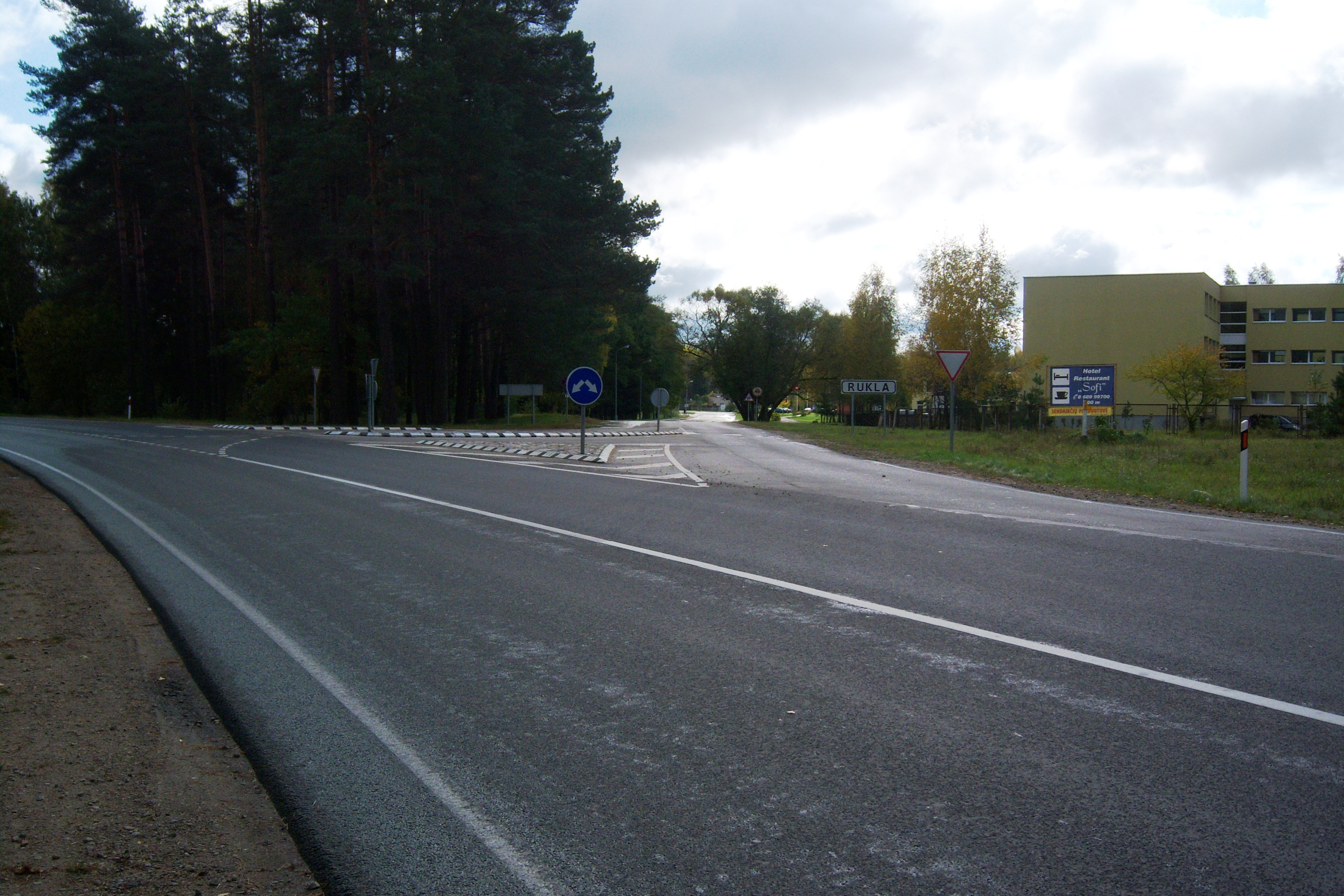
Road to Rukla

== See also ==
- Gaižiūnai
- Pabradė
