= Kaišiadorys District Municipality =

Kaišiadorys District Municipality Kaišiadorių rajono savivaldybė
- District Municipality
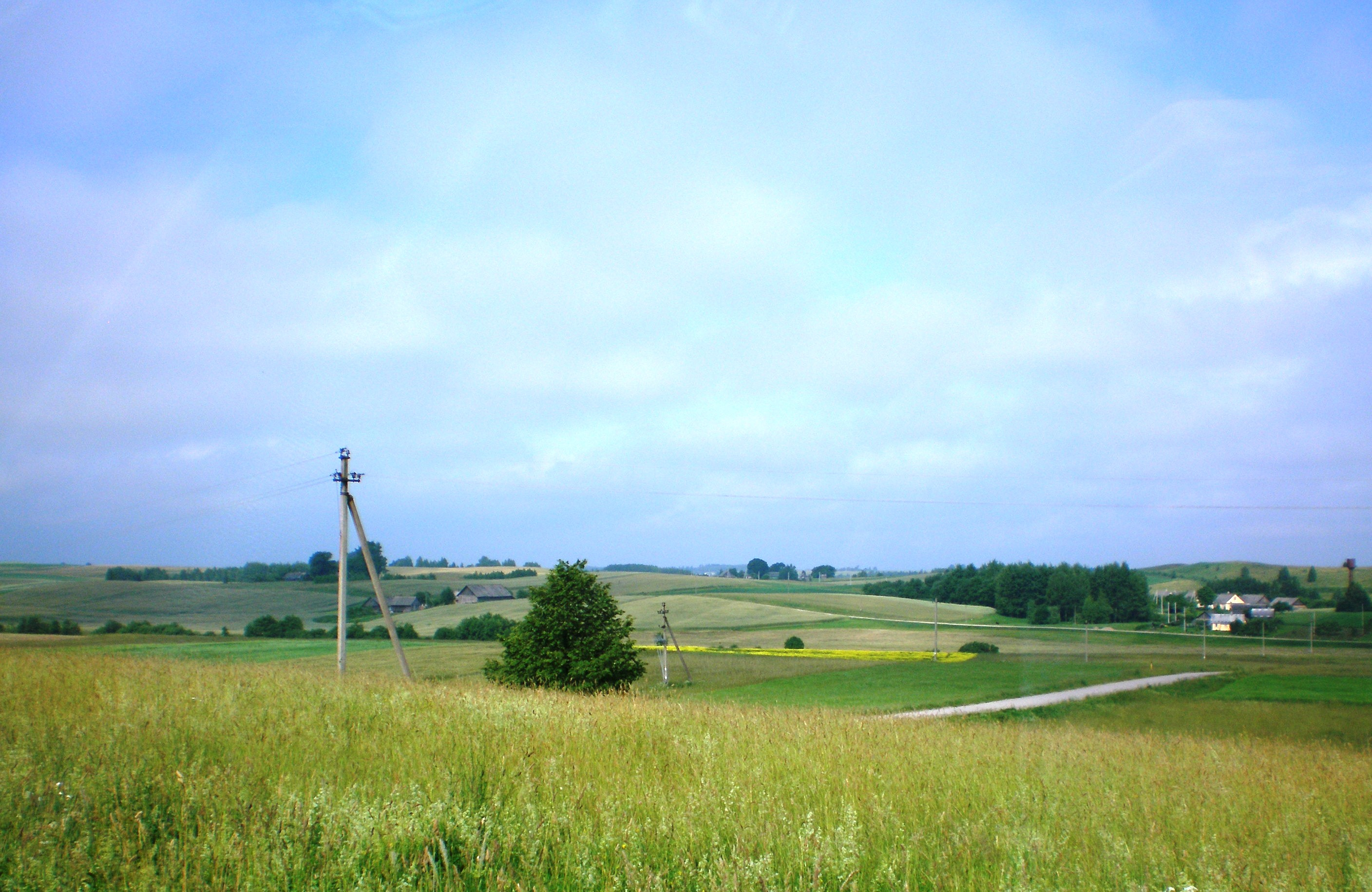
- Dzūkai elevation near Viliūnai

- Coat of arms

- Location of Kaišiadorys District Municipality within Lithuania

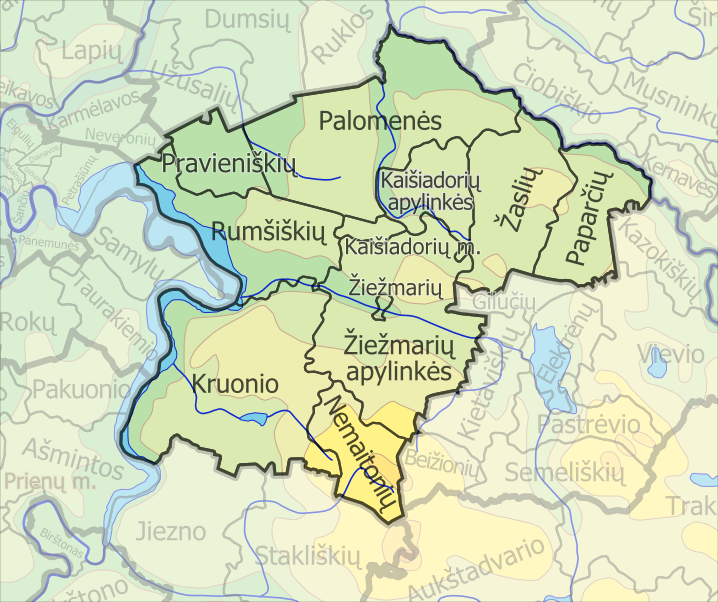
- Location of Kaišiadorys
- Coordinates: 54°51′37″N 24°27′16″E
- Country: Lithuania
- Region: Aukštaitija
- County: Kaunas County
- Established: 1950 (76 years ago)
- Capital: Kaišiadorys
- Elderships: 11

Government
  - Type: City Council
  - Body: Kaišiadorys District Council
  - Mayor: Šarūnas Čėsna (LRLS)
  - Leading: Liberal Movement 7 / 25

Area
  - Total: 1,087 km^{2} (420 sq mi)
  - Rank: 36th
- Elevation: 251 m (823 ft)

Population (2022)
  - Total: 29,456
  - Rank: 28th
  - Density: 27.1/km^{2} (70/sq mi)
  - Rank: 27th
- Time zone: UTC+2 (EET)
  - Summer (DST): UTC+3 (EEST)
- ZIP Codes: 56001–56551
- Phone code: +370 (346)
- Website: www.kaisiadorys.lt

Kaišiadorys District Municipality is one of 60 municipalities in Lithuania.

== Elderships ==
Kaišiadorys District Municipality is divided into 11 elderships:

Eldership (Administrative Center)	Area	Population (2021)
Kaišiadorys Vicinity (Kaišiadorys)	54 km^{2} (13,343.69 acres; 20.85 sq mi)	1,890
Kaišiadorys City (Kaišiadorys)	11 km^{2} (2,718.16 acres; 4.25 sq mi)	8,380
Kruonis (Kruonis)	224 km^{2} (55,351.61 acres; 86.49 sq mi)	2,295
Nemaitonys (Varkalės)	58 km^{2} (14,332.11 acres; 22.39 sq mi)	365
Palomenė (Palomenė)	203 km^{2} (50,162.39 acres; 78.38 sq mi)	1,606
Paparčiai (Paparčiai)	60 km^{2} (14,826.32 acres; 23.17 sq mi)	573
Pravieniškės (Pravieniškės)	42 km^{2} (10,378.43 acres; 16.22 sq mi)	3,233
Rumšiškės (Rumšiškės)	122 km^{2} (30,146.86 acres; 47.10 sq mi)	3,806
Žasliai (Žasliai)	109 km^{2} (26,934.49 acres; 42.09 sq mi)	1,841
Žiežmariai (Žiežmariai)	3.8 km^{2} (939.00 acres; 1.47 sq mi)	3,158
Žiežmariai Vicinity (Žiežmariai)	140 km^{2} (34,594.75 acres; 54.05 sq mi)	2,688
