= Šveicarija Eldership =

Šveicarija Eldership Šveicarijos seniūnija
- Eldership
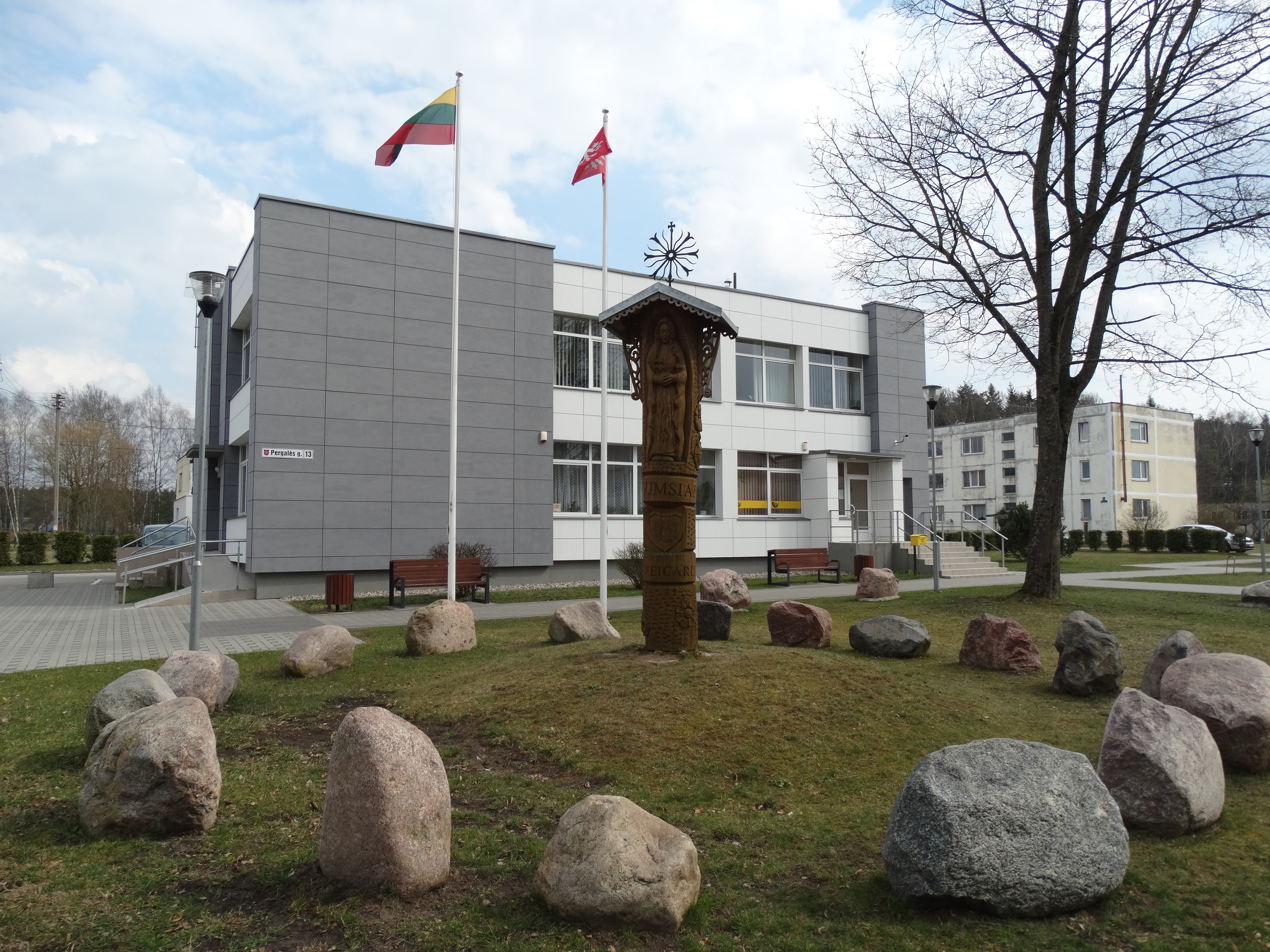
- Šveicarija Eldership office

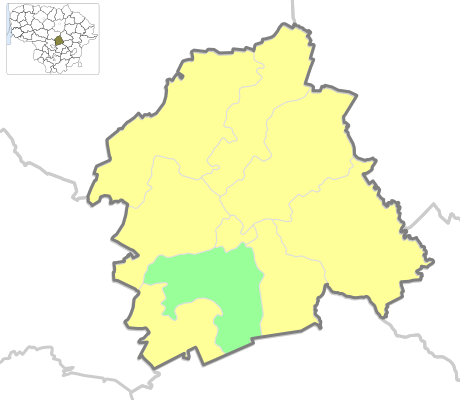
- Location of Šveicarija eldership
- Coordinates: 55°01′N 24°14′E
- Country: Lithuania
- Ethnographic region: Aukštaitija
- County: Kaunas County
- Municipality: Jonava District Municipality
- Administrative centre: Šveicarija

Area
  - Total: 91.51 km^{2} (35.33 sq mi)

Population (2021)
  - Total: 2,229
  - Density: 24.36/km^{2} (63.09/sq mi)
- Time zone: UTC+2 (EET)
  - Summer (DST): UTC+3 (EEST)

Šveicarija Eldership (previously Dumsiai Eldership, Lithuanian: Šveicarijos seniūnija) is a Lithuanian eldership, located in a southern part of Jonava District Municipality. As of 2020, administrative centre and largest settlement within eldership was Šveicarija.

== History ==
On 29 of March 2012 the Council of Jonava District Municipality approved the name change of eldership from Dumsiai eldership to Šveicarija eldership.

== Geography ==
- Forests: Dumsiai Forest, Gaižiūnai Forest
- Rivers: Varpė, Taurosta, Jasnogurka;
- Lakes: Bulotai Lake;
- Ponds: Šveicarija Pond;
- Quarries: Zatyškiai Quarry, Tekas Quarry;

== Populated places ==
Following settlements are located in the Šveicarija Eldership (as for 2011 census):

- Villages: Albertava, Bagdonava, Bajoriškiai, Barborlaukis, Bartoniai, Bulotai, Dirvaliai, Dumsiai, Dumsiškiai, Gaižiūnai, Gulbiniškiai, Gumbiškiai, Kisieliškiai, Klimynė, Londonas, Lukošiškiai, Marinauka, Meškoniai, Naujatriobiai, Paryžius, Petrynė, Prapuolynė, Pušynėlis, Ratušėliai, Salupiai, Skarbinai, Spanėnai, Stašėnai, Stepanava, Šalūgiškiai, Šileikos, Šveicarija, Varpiai
- Railway settlements: Dumsiai GS, Gaižiūnai GS

== Transport ==
The A6 highway is the main road connecting settlements with Jonava.

== Demography ==
Historical population

Year	Pop.	±% p.a.
2001	1,985	—
2011	2,244	+1.23%

Year	Pop.	±% p.a.
2021	2,229	−0.07%

Source: 1902, 1923, 1959 & 1970, 1979, 1989, 2001, 20112021

== Elections ==
=== 2023 municipality elections ===
Political party	Municipality elections	
Political party	Votes	%
Social Democratic Party of Lithuania	443	54.7%
Liberals' Movement	75	9.3%
Political committee Our Jonava	56	6.9%
Homeland Union	55	6.8%
Lithuanian Farmers and Greens Union	55	6.8%
Labour Party	37	4.6%
Lithuanian Regions Party	23	2.8%
Union of Democrats "For Lithuania"	21	2.6%
Freedom Party (Lithuania)	14	1.7%
Total registered voters: 2,069		Turnout: 39.15%
