= 2023 Lithuanian municipal elections =

- 3 March 2023 (first round); 17 March 2023 (second round)
- All 60 Mayors; All 1,498 seats in Municipal Councils
| Party | Leader | Vote % | Seats | +/– |
Mayors
| LSDP | Vilija Blinkevičiūtė | 17.28 | 17 | +2 |
| Committees | —N/a | 16.61 | 11 | −1 |
| LS | Viktorija Čmilytė-Nielsen | 7.45 | 9 | +3 |
| LVŽS | Ramūnas Karbauskis | 9.35 | 8 | +2 |
| TS–LKD | Gabrielius Landsbergis | 15.80 | 5 | −6 |
| DSVL | Saulius Skvernelis | 6.24 | 5 | New |
| PLT | Artūras Paulauskas | 7.06 | 2 | −4 |
| LLRA–KŠS | Waldemar Tomaszewski | 4.85 | 1 | −1 |
| LRP | Jonas Pinskus | 2.55 | 1 | +1 |
| Independents | —N/a | 2.93 | 1 | 0 |
Municipal Councils
| LSDP | Vilija Blinkevičiūtė | 18.13 | 358 | +98 |
| TS–LKD | Gabrielius Landsbergis | 16.83 | 243 | −27 |
| LVŽS | Ramūnas Karbauskis | 9.56 | 185 | −40 |
| Committees | —N/a | 14.38 | 183 | −122 |
| LS | Viktorija Čmilytė-Nielsen | 7.22 | 143 | +13 |
| DSVL | Saulius Skvernelis | 6.93 | 124 | New |
| LLRA–KŠS | Waldemar Tomaszewski | 5.54 | 57 | +6 |
| PLT | Artūras Paulauskas | 5.40 | 56 | −37 |
| LRP | Jonas Pinskus | 2.57 | 56 | +30 |
| DP | Viktor Uspaskich | 3.81 | 46 | −15 |
| LP | Aušrinė Armonaitė | 3.69 | 15 | New |
| LŽP | Ieva Budraitė | 1.72 | 14 | +9 |
| KS | Rimantas Jonas Dagys | 0.54 | 8 | New |
| TTS | Petras Gražulis | 0.95 | 7 | −6 |
| NS | Vytautas Radžvilas | 1.17 | 3 | New |
This lists parties that won seats. See the complete results below.
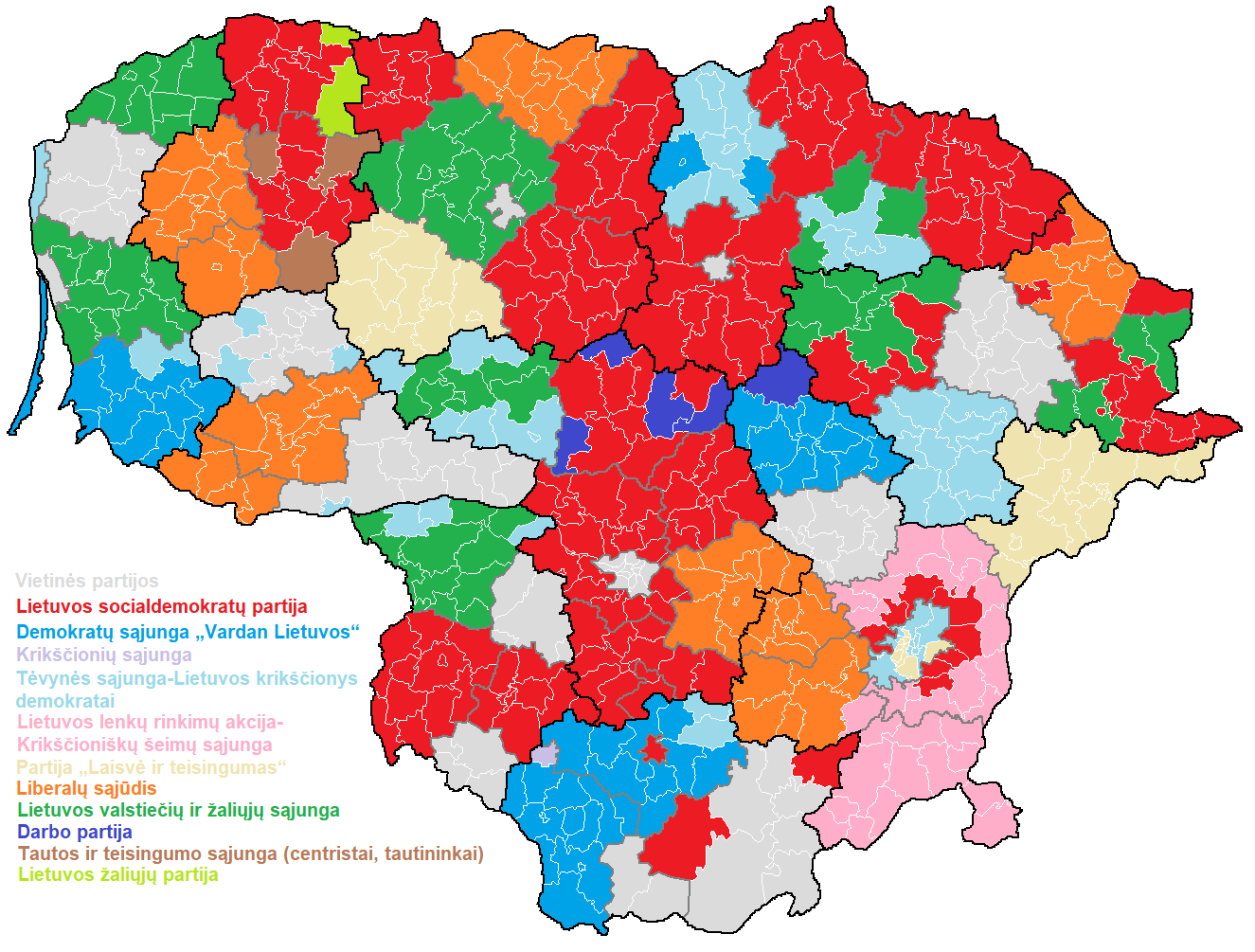

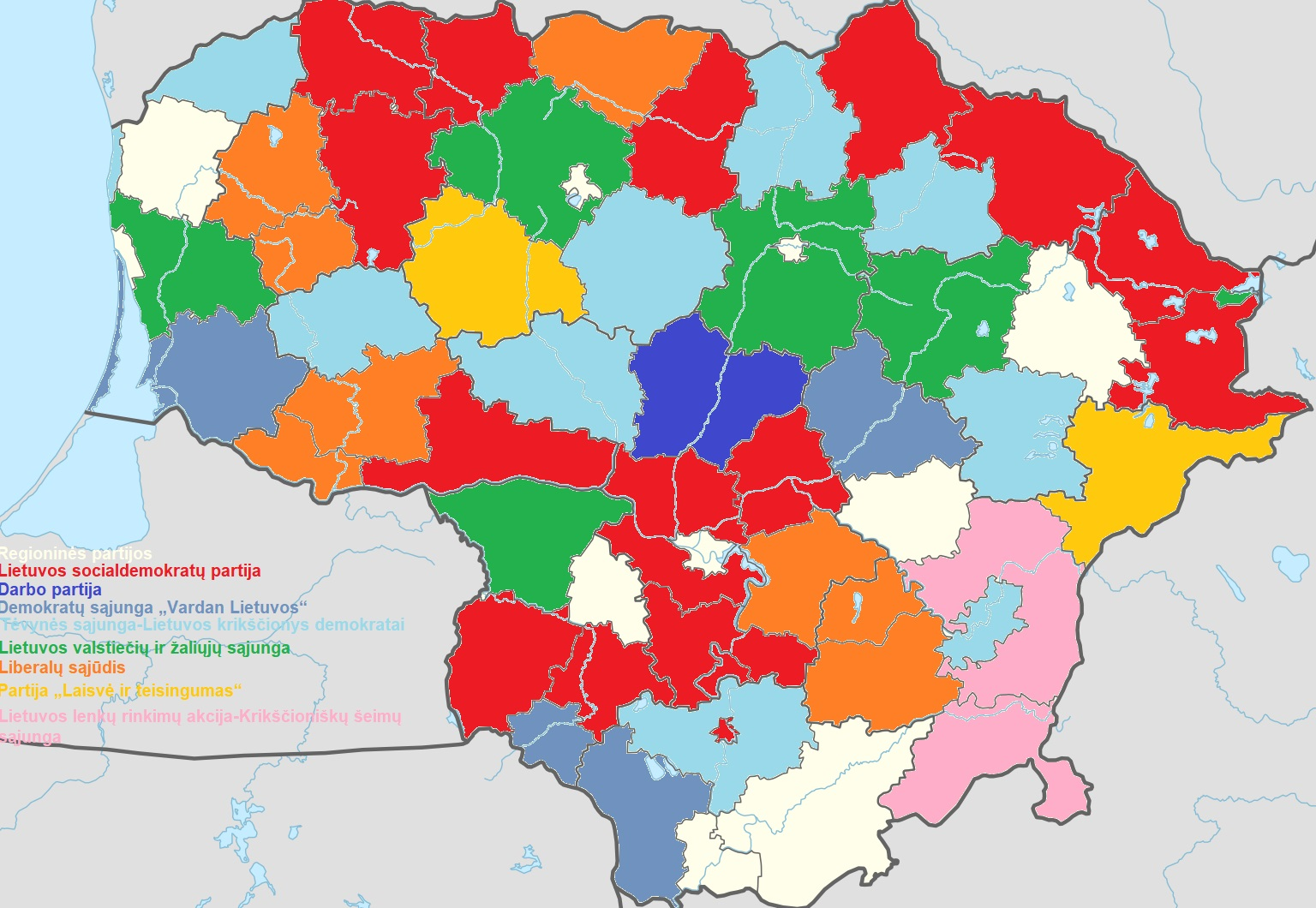

Municipal elections in Lithuania were held on 5 March 2023 and saw 1,498 members of the municipal councils and 60 mayors elected to office for a four-year term. Next election will be the 2027 Lithuanian Municipal Elections.

== Election system ==
Size of council in each municipality varies depending on populations. Lowest population municipalities with up to 5,000 residents have 15 seats, while largest municipalities with over 500,000 inhabitants have 51 seats.

Size of council by population
| Seats | Number of residents |
|---|---|
| 51 | More than 500,000 |
| 41 | 250,000–500,000 |
| 31 | 100,000–250,000 |
| 27 | 50,000–100,000 |
| 25 | 20,000–50,000 |
| 21 | 10,000–20,000 |
| 17 | 5,000–10,000 |
| 15 | Less than 5,000 |

During mayoral elections, a single candidate must receive over 50% in first round, otherwise the top two candidates will participate in second round. If turnout is less than 40% in specific municipality, the candidate must receive at least 20% of all registered votes to win the title.

=== Changes in regulations ===
New Lithuanian Elections Codecs came into power on 1 September 2022. With new regulations all elected mayors will no longer have a seat in the municipal council and the number of mayoral terms is now capped at a maximum of three.

== Mayoral elections ==
| Municipality | Elected mayor |
|---|---|
| Akmenė District Municipality | Vitalijus Mitrofanovas |
| Alytus | Nerijus Cesiulis |
| Alytus District Municipality | Rasa Vitkauskienė |
| Anykščiai District Municipality | Kęstutis Tubis |
| Birštonas Municipality | Nijolė Dirginčienė |
| Biržai District Municipality | Kęstutis Knizikevičius |
| Druskininkai Municipality | Ričardas Malinauskas |
| Elektrėnai Municipality | Gediminas Ratkevičius |
| Ignalina District Municipality | Laimutis Ragaišis |
| Jonava District Municipality | Mindaugas Sinkevičius |
| Joniškis District Municipality | Vitalijus Gailius |
| Jurbarkas District Municipality | Skirmantas Mockevičius |
| Kaišiadorys District Municipality | Šarūnas Čėsna |
| Kalvarija Municipality | Nerijus Šidlauskas |
| Kaunas | Visvaldas Matijošaitis |
| Kaunas District Municipality | Valerijus Makūnas |
| Kazlų Rūda Municipality | Mantas Varaška |
| Kelmė District Municipality | Idelfonsas Petkevičius |
| Kėdainiai District Municipality | Valentinas Tamulis |
| Klaipėda | Arvydas Vaitkus |
| Klaipėda District Municipality | Bronius Markauskas |
| Kretinga District Municipality | Antanas Kalnius |
| Kupiškis District Municipality | Dainius Bardauskas |
| Lazdijai District Municipality | Ausma Miškinienė |
| Marijampolė Municipality | Povilas Isoda |
| Mažeikiai District Municipality | Rūta Matulaitienė |
| Molėtai District Municipality | Saulius Jauneika |
| Neringa Municipality | Darius Jasaitis |
| Pagėgiai Municipality | Vaidas Bendaravičius |
| Pakruojis District Municipality | Saulius Margis |
| Palanga | Šarūnas Vaitkus |
| Panevėžys | Rytis Mykolas Račkauskas |
| Panevėžys District Municipality | Antanas Pocius |
| Pasvalys District Municipality | Gintautas Gegužinskas |
| Plungė District Municipality | Audrius Klišonis |
| Prienai District Municipality | Alvydas Vaicekauskas |
| Radviliškis District Municipality | Kazimieras Račkauskis |
| Raseiniai District Municipality | Arvydas Nekrošius |
| Rietavas Municipality | Antanas Černeckis |
| Rokiškis District Municipality | Ramūnas Godeliauskas |
| Skuodas District Municipality | Stasys Gutautas |
| Šakiai District Municipality | Raimondas Januševičius |
| Šalčininkai District Municipality | Zdzisław Palewicz |
| Šiauliai | Artūras Visockas |
| Šiauliai District Municipality | Česlovas Greičius |
| Šilalė District Municipality | Tadas Bartkus |
| Šilutė District Municipality | Vytautas Laurinaitis |
| Širvintos District Municipality | Živilė Pinskuvienė |
| Švenčionys District Municipality | Rimantas Klipčius |
| Tauragė District Municipality | Dovydas Kaminskas |
| Telšiai District Municipality | Tomas Katkus |
| Trakai District Municipality | Andrius Šatevičius |
| Ukmergė District Municipality | Darius Varnas |
| Utena District Municipality | Marijus Kaukėnas |
| Varėna District Municipality | Algis Kašėta |
| Vilkaviškis District Municipality | Algirdas Neiberka |
| Vilnius | Valdas Benkunskas |
| Vilnius District Municipality | Robert Duchniewicz |
| Visaginas Municipality | Erlandas Galaguz |
| Zarasai District Municipality | Nijolė Guobienė |

=== Vilnius Mayor ===
| Candidate | Party | First round | | Second round | |
| Candidate | Party | Votes | % | Votes | % |
|---|---|---|---|---|---|
| Valdas Benkunskas | Homeland Union | 68,788 | 31.13 | 116,464 | 52.73 |
| Artūras Zuokas | Freedom and Justice | 47,805 | 21.64 | 104,412 | 47.27 |
| Mykolas Majauskas | Independent | 23,789 | 10.77 | | |
| Tomas Vytautas Raskevičius | Freedom Party | 22,146 | 10.02 | | |
| Waldemar Tomaszewski | Electoral Action of Poles in Lithuania | 19,018 | 8.61 | | |
| Vytautas Sinica | National Alliance | 8,347 | 3.78 | | |
| Rasa Budbergytė | Social Democratic Party of Lithuania | 5,606 | 2.54 | | |
| Lukas Savickas | Union of Democrats "For Lithuania" | 4,515 | 2.04 | | |
| Eglė Radvilė | Liberals' Movement | 4,106 | 1.86 | | |
| Valdas Tutkus | Lithuanian Regions Party | 4,048 | 1.83 | | |
| Ieva Kačinskaitė-Urbonienė | Labour Party | 3,183 | 1.44 | | |
| Stasys Jakeliūnas | Lithuanian Farmers and Greens Union | 2,965 | 1.34 | | |
| Petras Gražulis | People and Justice Union | 2,352 | 1.06 | | |
| Aidas Gedvilas | Independent | 2,190 | 0.99 | | |
| Remigijus Lapinskas | Lithuanian Green Party | 1,661 | 0.75 | | |
| Ramojus Girinskas | Young Lithuania | 436 | 0.20 | | |
| Total | | 220,955 | 100.00 | 220,876 | 100.00 |
| Valid votes | | 220,955 | 98.90 | 220,876 | 98.71 |
| Invalid/blank votes | | 2,464 | 1.10 | 2,889 | 1.29 |
| Total votes | | 223,419 | 100.00 | 223,765 | 100.00 |
| Registered voters/turnout | | 453,315 | 49.29 | 453,670 | 49.32 |
Source: VRK (first round), VRK (second round)

=== Kaunas Mayor ===
| Candidate | Party | Votes | % |
|---|---|---|---|
| Visvaldas Matijošaitis | Public election committee "United Kaunas" | 77,762 | 59.66 |
| Aurelijus Veryga | Lithuanian Farmers and Greens Union | 16,639 | 12.77 |
| Vytautas Juozapaitis | Homeland Union | 12,817 | 9.83 |
| Ieva Budraitė | Lithuanian Green Party | 6,070 | 4.66 |
| Nijolė Putrienė | Liberals' Movement | 3,851 | 2.95 |
| Gintautas Labanauskas | Union of Democrats "For Lithuania" | 3,674 | 2.82 |
| Mantas Bertulis | Freedom Party | 2,982 | 2.29 |
| Darius Razmislevičius | Social Democratic Party of Lithuania | 2,720 | 2.09 |
| Darius Trečiakauskas | Christian Union | 1,375 | 1.05 |
| Marijus Velička | Labour Party | 1,356 | 1.04 |
| Rūta Zabielienė | People and Justice Union | 596 | 0.46 |
| Dainius Varnas | Freedom and Justice | 492 | 0.38 |
| Total | | 130,334 | 100.00 |
| Valid votes | | 130,334 | 97.76 |
| Invalid/blank votes | | 2,986 | 2.24 |
| Total votes | | 133,320 | 100.00 |
| Registered voters/turnout | | 247,958 | 53.77 |
Source: VRK

=== Klaipėda Mayor ===
| Candidate | Party | First round | | Second round | |
| Candidate | Party | Votes | % | Votes | % |
|---|---|---|---|---|---|
| Arvydas Vaitkus | Public election committee "Loyal to Klaipėda" | 12,004 | 24.00 | 30,913 | 62.56 |
| Audrius Petrošius | Homeland Union | 10,421 | 20.84 | 18,502 | 37.44 |
| Remigijus Žemaitaitis | Freedom and Justice | 10,212 | 20.42 | | |
| Ligita Girskienė | Lithuanian Farmers and Greens Union | 5,571 | 11.14 | | |
| Vytautas Grubliauskas | Social Democratic Party of Lithuania | 3,843 | 7.68 | | |
| Saulius Budinas | Liberals' Movement | 3,681 | 7.36 | | |
| Artūras Bogdanovas | Union of Democrats "For Lithuania" | 1,164 | 2.33 | | |
| Birutė Andruškaitė | Freedom Party | 1,040 | 2.08 | | |
| Naglis Puteikis | People and Justice Union | 955 | 1.91 | | |
| Giedrius Bindza | Labour Party | 643 | 1.29 | | |
| Arvydas Ektis | Lithuanian Green Party | 476 | 0.95 | | |
| Total | | 50,010 | 100.00 | 49,415 | 100.00 |
| Valid votes | | 50,010 | 98.15 | 49,415 | 98.49 |
| Invalid/blank votes | | 945 | 1.85 | 757 | 1.51 |
| Total votes | | 50,955 | 100.00 | 50,172 | 100.00 |
| Registered voters/turnout | | 124,879 | 40.80 | 124,954 | 40.15 |
Source: VRK (first round), VRK (second round)

== Municipal councils' results ==
| Party | Municipality | | | Mayoral (first round) | | | Mayoral (second round) | | | Total seats |
| Party | Votes | % | Seats | Votes | % | Seats | Votes | % | Seats | Total seats |
|---|---|---|---|---|---|---|---|---|---|---|
| Social Democratic Party of Lithuania | 204,029 | 18.13 | 358 | 197,796 | 17.28 | 10 | 88,835 | 13.81 | 7 | 17 |
| Homeland Union | 189,396 | 16.83 | 243 | 180,888 | 15.80 | 2 | 182,739 | 28.41 | 3 | 5 |
| Lithuanian Farmers and Greens Union | 107,568 | 9.56 | 185 | 107,055 | 9.35 | 0 | 56,805 | 8.83 | 8 | 8 |
| Liberals' Movement | 81,262 | 7.22 | 143 | 85,285 | 7.45 | 4 | 30,691 | 4.77 | 5 | 9 |
| Union of Democrats "For Lithuania" | 78,052 | 6.93 | 124 | 71,440 | 6.24 | 1 | 35,700 | 5.55 | 4 | 5 |
| Electoral Action of Poles in Lithuania | 62,359 | 5.54 | 57 | 55,558 | 4.85 | 1 | 27,220 | 4.23 | 0 | 1 |
| Freedom and Justice | 60,794 | 5.40 | 56 | 80,757 | 7.06 | 1 | 113,823 | 17.69 | 1 | 2 |
| Labour Party | 42,927 | 3.81 | 46 | 33,447 | 2.92 | 0 | 12,478 | 1.94 | 0 | 0 |
| Freedom Party | 41,522 | 3.69 | 15 | 30,132 | 2.63 | 0 | 3,505 | 0.54 | 0 | 0 |
| Lithuanian Regions Party | 28,927 | 2.57 | 56 | 29,140 | 2.55 | 1 | 4,328 | 0.67 | 0 | 1 |
| Lithuanian Green Party | 19,386 | 1.72 | 14 | 14,718 | 1.29 | 0 | 6,896 | 1.07 | 0 | 0 |
| National Alliance | 13,140 | 1.17 | 3 | 9,223 | 0.81 | 0 | | | | 0 |
| People and Justice Union | 10,704 | 0.95 | 7 | 11,661 | 1.02 | 0 | 7,070 | 1.10 | 0 | 0 |
| Christian Union | 6,124 | 0.54 | 8 | 5,864 | 0.51 | 0 | 3,016 | 0.47 | 0 | 0 |
| Young Lithuania | 1,495 | 0.13 | 0 | 436 | 0.04 | 0 | | | | 0 |
| Samogitian Party | 741 | 0.07 | 0 | 489 | 0.04 | 0 | | | | 0 |
| Public election committees | 161,861 | 14.38 | 183 | 190,103 | 16.61 | 6 | 65,418 | 10.17 | 5 | 11 |
| Coalitions (Note: In some municipalities, parties formed coalitions. A total of 17 seats have already been allocated to the respective parties in the results table. These include 8 seats for the Liberals' Movement, 4 seats for the Homeland Union, 2 seats each for the Freedom Party and the Lithuanian Green Party, and 1 seat for Freedom and Justice.) | 15,371 | 1.37 | 17 | 7,033 | 0.61 | 0 | | | | 0 |
| Independents | | | | 33,552 | 2.93 | 0 | 4,789 | 0.74 | 1 | 1 |
| Total | 1,125,658 | 100.00 | 1,498 | 1,144,577 | 100.00 | 26 | 643,313 | 100.00 | 34 | 60 |
| Valid votes | 1,125,658 | 96.28 | | 1,144,577 | 97.89 | | 643,313 | 98.66 | | |
| Invalid/blank votes | 43,516 | 3.72 | | 24,639 | 2.11 | | 8,763 | 1.34 | | |
| Total votes | 1,169,174 | 100.00 | | 1,169,216 | 100.00 | | 652,076 | 100.00 | | |
| Registered voters/turnout | 2,389,342 | 48.93 | | 2,389,342 | 48.93 | | 1,423,124 | 45.82 | | |
Source: VRK

=== Vilnius City Council ===
| Party | Votes | % | Seats |
|---|---|---|---|
| Homeland Union | 65,718 | 30.45 | 19 |
| Freedom and Justice | 31,537 | 14.61 | 9 |
| Freedom Party | 29,330 | 13.59 | 9 |
| Electoral Action of Poles in Lithuania | 23,892 | 11.07 | 7 |
| Social Democratic Party of Lithuania | 13,811 | 6.40 | 4 |
| National Alliance | 10,416 | 4.83 | 3 |
| Liberals' Movement | 8,365 | 3.88 | 0 |
| Union of Democrats "For Lithuania" | 8,361 | 3.87 | 0 |
| Labour Party | 6,098 | 2.83 | 0 |
| Lithuanian Farmers and Greens Union | 5,020 | 2.33 | 0 |
| Lithuanian Regions Party | 4,237 | 1.96 | 0 |
| Lithuanian Green Party | 3,910 | 1.81 | 0 |
| People and Justice Union | 2,470 | 1.14 | 0 |
| Young Lithuania | 1,495 | 0.69 | 0 |
| Christian Union | 1,191 | 0.55 | 0 |
| Total | 215,851 | 100.00 | 51 |
| Valid votes | 215,851 | 96.64 | |
| Invalid/blank votes | 7,509 | 3.36 | |
| Total votes | 223,360 | 100.00 | |
| Registered voters/turnout | 453,315 | 49.27 | |
Source: VRK

=== Kaunas City Council ===
| Party or alliance | | Votes | % | Seats |
|---|---|---|---|---|
| Public election committee "United Kaunas" | | 64,351 | 49.73 | 26 |
| Homeland Union | | 20,635 | 15.95 | 8 |
| Lithuanian Farmers and Greens Union | | 9,828 | 7.60 | 4 |
| Social Democratic Party of Lithuania | | 6,944 | 5.37 | 3 |
| Union of Democrats "For Lithuania" | | 5,323 | 4.11 | 0 |
| Lithuanian Green Party | | 5,071 | 3.92 | 0 |
| Freedom Party | | 4,954 | 3.83 | 0 |
| Liberals' Movement | | 4,700 | 3.63 | 0 |
| Strong family - Strong Kaunas | Christian Union | 3,049 | 2.36 | 0 |
| Strong family - Strong Kaunas | People and Justice Union | 3,049 | 2.36 | 0 |
| National Alliance | | 2,019 | 1.56 | 0 |
| Labour Party | | 1,872 | 1.45 | 0 |
| Freedom and Justice | | 642 | 0.50 | 0 |
| Total | | 129,388 | 100.00 | 41 |
| Valid votes | | 129,388 | 98.49 | |
| Invalid/blank votes | | 1,980 | 1.51 | |
| Total votes | | 131,368 | 100.00 | |
| Registered voters/turnout | | 247,958 | 52.98 | |
Source: VRK

=== Klaipėda City Council ===
| Party | Votes | % | Seats |
|---|---|---|---|
| Public election committee "Loyal to Klaipėda" | 10,166 | 20.75 | 8 |
| Freedom and Justice | 9,188 | 18.75 | 7 |
| Homeland Union | 9,086 | 18.54 | 7 |
| Liberals' Movement | 4,766 | 9.73 | 3 |
| Lithuanian Farmers and Greens Union | 4,505 | 9.19 | 3 |
| Social Democratic Party of Lithuania | 3,977 | 8.12 | 3 |
| Freedom Party | 1,954 | 3.99 | 0 |
| Union of Democrats "For Lithuania" | 1,846 | 3.77 | 0 |
| Lithuanian Green Party | 1,241 | 2.53 | 0 |
| Labour Party | 1,228 | 2.51 | 0 |
| People and Justice Union | 1,045 | 2.13 | 0 |
| Total | 49,002 | 100.00 | 31 |
| Valid votes | 49,002 | 94.26 | |
| Invalid/blank votes | 2,986 | 5.74 | |
| Total votes | 51,988 | 100.00 | |
| Registered voters/turnout | 124,879 | 41.63 | |
Source: VRK

== See also ==
- Elections in Lithuania
