= 2027 Lithuanian municipal elections =

- 7 March 2027 (expected)
- All 60 Mayors; All 1,494 seats in Municipal Councils
Party	Leader	Current seats
Mayors
LSDP	Mindaugas Sinkevičius	17
Committees	—N/a	11
LS	Viktorija Čmilytė-Nielsen	9
LVŽS	Aurelijus Veryga	8
TS–LKD	Laurynas Kasčiūnas	5
DSVL	Virginijus Sinkevičius	5
CDS	Petras Čimbaras	2
LLRA–KŠS	Waldemar Tomaszewski	1
LRP	Giedrė Pavasarytė	1
Independents	—N/a	1
Municipal Councils
LSDP	Mindaugas Sinkevičius	358
TS–LKD	Laurynas Kasčiūnas	243
LVŽS	Aurelijus Veryga	185
Committees	—N/a	183
LS	Viktorija Čmilytė-Nielsen	143
DSVL	Virginijus Sinkevičius	124
LLRA–KŠS	Waldemar Tomaszewski	57
CDS	Petras Čimbaras	56
LRP	Giedrė Pavasarytė	56
DP	Gintaras Steponėnas	46
LP	Vytautas Mitalas	15
LŽP	Ieva Budraitė	14
KS	Rimantas Jonas Dagys	8
TTS	Rimas Jonas Jankūnas	7
NS	Vytautas Sinica	3

The next municipal elections in Lithuania are expected to be held on 7 March 2027 to elect the 1,494 members of the municipal councils and 60 mayors.

== Election system ==
Size of council in each municipality varies depending on populations. Lowest population municipalities with up to 5,000 residents have 15 seats, while largest municipalities with over 500,000 inhabitants have 51 seats. A total of 1,494 municipal council members will be elected, compared with 1,498 in 2023. Akmenė District Municipality and Kalvarija Municipality each will elect four fewer council members, while Palanga City Municipality will elect four more.

Size of council by population
Seats	Number of residents
51	More than 500,000
41	250,000–500,000
31	100,000–250,000
27	50,000–100,000
25	20,000–50,000
21	10,000–20,000
17	5,000–10,000
15	Less than 5,000

During mayoral elections, a single candidate must receive over 50% in first round, otherwise the top two candidates will participate in second round. If turnout is less than 40% in specific municipality, the candidate must receive at least 20% of all registered votes to win the title.

== See also ==
- Elections in Lithuania
