= Artūras Orlauskas =

Lithuanian comedian & politician (born 1962)

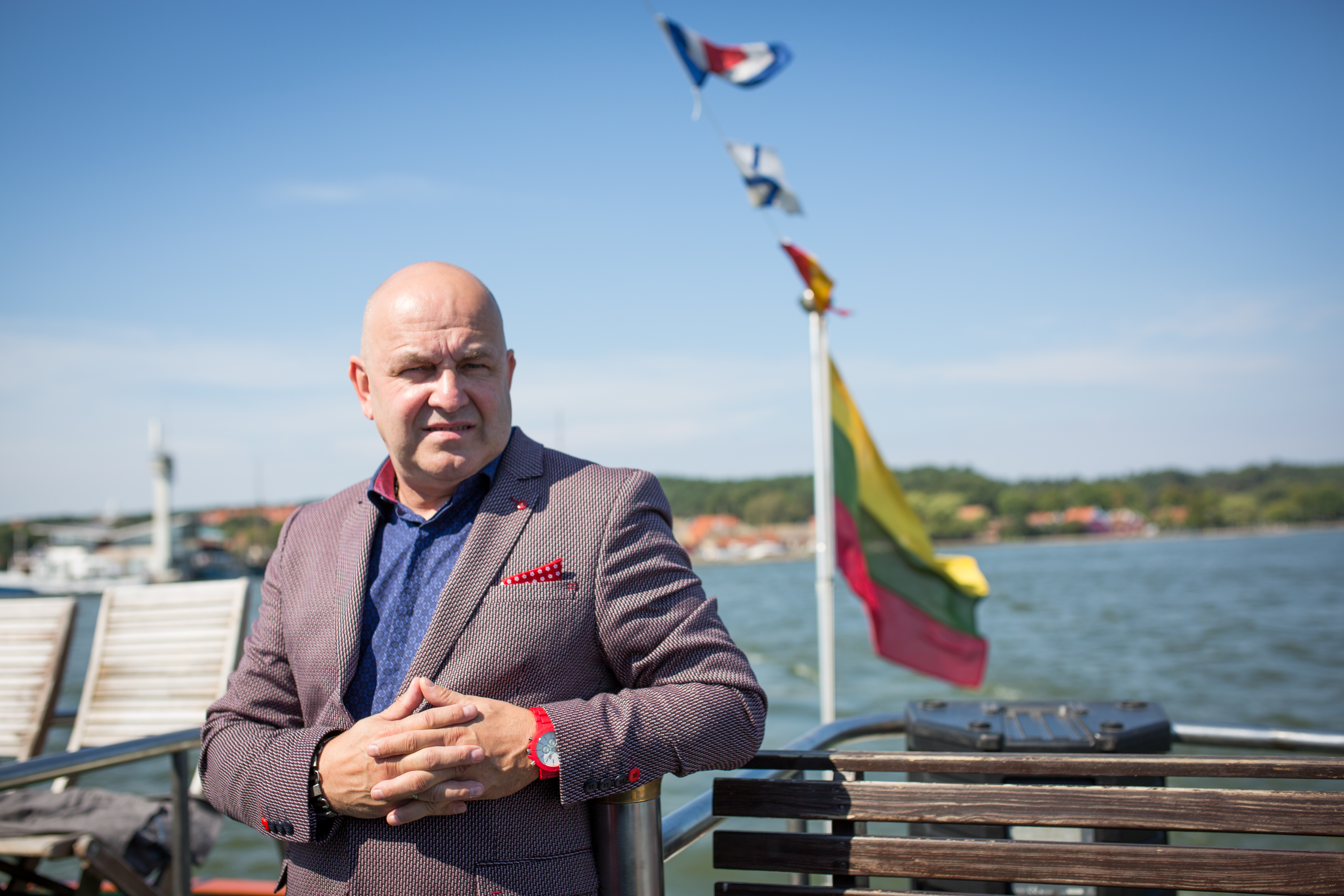

Member of the Municipal Council of Kaunas City Municipality
- In office 2011–2015

Member of the Municipal Council of Kaunas District Municipality
- In office 2002–2011

Personal details
- Born: 21 April 1962 (age 64) Kaunas, Lithuania
- Party: Christian Union (2023–present)
- Other political affiliations: New Union (Social Liberals) (2000-2009); Social Democratic Party of Lithuania (2009-2011)
- Spouse: Edita
- Education: Kaunas University of Technology

Artūras Orlauskas (born 21 April 1962) is a Lithuanian comedian, actor, politician, one of the leaders of the Lithuanian Family Movement, and water polo player. He is the leader of the electoral list of the People and Justice Union in the 2024 Lithuanian parliamentary election.

== Biography ==
Orlauskas was born in Kaunas in 1962. He graduated from Kaunas Polytechnic Institute as a technological engineer in 1986. He also claimed that he graduated from the Lithuanian University of Agriculture in 2006, however, in 2023, the university administration informed that he was struck out from the student list in 2011 as he did not return from student sabbatical leave.

Orlauskas became a water polo player in his youth and participated in several competitions, and was invited to the Soviet Union junior national team, but was forbidden to participate by his parents. With the Alytus team "Dzūkija", he became the champion of the Lithuanian Water Polo Championships in 2004. He was the president of the Lithuanian Water Polo Federation from 2007 to 2014. In 2010, he became a world water polo vice-champion with the Lithuanian veteran national team.

Orlauskas began a career in television in 1992, starting with the sitcom Bentski šou. He acted in or directed in several TV shows and sitcoms, including Kaimynai, Šeštadienio šou and Šou bulvaras. He cooperated with the internationally famous Russian comedian and actor Efim Shifrin in his March of Humor in 1998. He is the author of 36 commercially released songs, and acted in several movies, including Out of the Ashes and Dungeons & Dragons: Wrath of the Dragon God. He is the director of Komiko teatras (Lithuanian: "Comedian Theatre").

== Political career ==
=== Early career ===
In 2015, Orlauskas claimed that he was a member of New Union (Social Liberals) from 2000 to 2009 and Social Democrats from 2009 to 2011. In 2024, he claimed that he was only a member of New Union from 2002 to 2010.

With the New Union, he participated in the 2004 European Parliament election in Lithuania and parliamentary elections in 2004 and 2008, but was unsuccessful. From 2002 to 2011, he was a member of the municipal council of Kaunas District Municipality, and vice-mayor of the municipality from 2005 to 2007. In 2011, he was elected to the municipal council of Kaunas city on the Social Democratic list.

In August 2011, Orlauskas advanced Eduardas Vaitkus, then a member of the Labour Party and closely connected to Orlauskas, to become the temporary director of Kaunas Red Cross Hospital. He also personally participated when Vaitkus and representatives of the municipality physically breached into the locked director's office of the hospital. A few days later, the Kaunas City District Court ruled that the appointment of Vaitkus was illegal. In November 2011, the Presidium of the Social Democratic Party of Lithuania ruled that with such actions Orlauskas had undermined the party's reputation and expelled him from the party.

As an independent, Orlauskas ran with Order and Justice in the 2012 parliamentary election and with Lithuanian Freedom Union (Liberals) in 2016, both times unsuccessfully.

=== "Family March" activism ===
In 2020, Orlauskas began publicly promoting misinformation about Bill Gates and the efficacy of vaccines. After the 2020 parliamentary election, and the first proposal to legalize same-sex unions in Lithuania, Orlauskas announced his intention to organize the Great Family Defense March (Lithuanian: "Didysis šeimos gynimo maršas"), an automobile march from Klaipėda to Vilnius which would promote family values, oppose same-sex partnerships and "gender ideology", and protest plans to ratify the Istanbul Convention. Orlauskas claimed that the March would "fucking sweep away the whole Seimas" (Lithuanian: "nušluosim nafig visą tą Seimą") and would besiege the parliament until their demands are met. The march was held on 15 May 2021 in Vingis Park and saw over 10 thousand people attending. The march was greeted with a pre-recorded speech by President Gitanas Nausėda.

The organizers of the march established the Lithuanian Family Movement on 27 June 2021 to promote their causes. Orlauskas continued to organize similar marches and protests, including on 10 September 2021, the anniversary of the original march on 15 May 2022, and on 22 October 2022, but none managed to reach the same level of turnout.

On 3 February 2024, the Lithuanian Family Movement merged with the Christian conservative Christian Union. Orlauskas, who had joined the party in 2023, was elected to the party's executive committee. The unified party adopted a Christian right, soft Eurosceptic platform.

In 2023, nominated by the Lithuanian Farmers and Greens Union, Orlauskas ran for Mayor of Kaunas District Municipality. He was put forward as the leader of the electoral list of the People and Justice Union in the 2024 Lithuanian parliamentary election.
