= Political committee =

Political committee may refer to:

- Political action committee, type of U.S. tax-exempt organization
- Political and Security Committee, French body within the European Union
- Political party committee, type of organization which finances political campaigns
- Public election committee (Lithuania), type of non-partisan political organization

== See also ==
- Political Affairs Committee (disambiguation)
