= Dagys =

Dagys is the masculine form of a Lithuanian family name. The Lithuanian word dagys means "thistle". Its feminine forms are: Dagienė (married woman or widow) and Dagytė (unmarried woman).

The surname may refer to:

- Rimantas Dagys, Lithuanian scientist and politician
- Jokūbas Dagys, Lithuanian sculptor, painter, and poet (, lt:Jokūbas Dagys)
