= Samogitian Party =

Samogitian Party Žemaitiu partėjė (Samogitian) Žemaičių partija (Lithuanian)
- Abbreviation: ŽP
- Leader: Stasys Gvažiauskas
- Founded: February 13, 2009
- Headquarters: Zarasų g. 12, Klaipėda
- Membership: 2,013 members (2023)
- Ideology: Regionalism; Samogitian minority interests
- Political position: Centre-right
- Seimas: 0 / 141
- European Parliament: 0 / 11
- Municipal councils and mayors: 0 / 1,558

Website
- www.zemaiciupartija.lt

The Samogitian Party (Lithuanian: Žemaičių partija, Samogitian: Žemaitiu partėjė) is a minor ethnic-regionalist autonomist party of Lithuania's Samogitian minority founded in February 2009.

== History ==
=== Origins ===
The predecessor to the party, the "Samogitians Were, Are and Will Be" Initiative Group (Samogitian: Žemaitē bova, īr ė būs, Lithuanian: Žemaičiai buvo, yra ir bus) was founded on 5 July 2007 by five founding members - including former Order and Justice Member of the Seimas Egidijus Skarbalius and Guinness World Record holder for the strongest beard Antanas Kontrimas. The founding of the initiative group was spurred by planned reforms to the administrative system of Lithuania which, according to the group, would erase the definition of Samogitia from law, as well as the group's failed attempts to define their ethnicity as Samogitian in their birth certificates. The group also demanded the Minister of Justice, Petras Baguška, to return 30 litas to the group which they had spent on their documents.

The initiative group attempted to organize projects in defense of Samogitian ethnicity, such as registering all Samogitians worldwide into a common registry, and promoting the pseudohistorical book "Samogitia" by amateur historian Charles Pichel, which presents an unfounded history of a supposed "Sun Dynasty" of Samogitia. In late 2007, the group decided to establish a political party.

=== Creation and activity ===
In 2008, the Ministry of Justice refused to register the party claiming that there were not enough participants at its inaugural meeting, but also that the programme failed to explicitly recognize Lithuania's territorial integrity and indivisibility and the fact that the Lithuanian language is the national language. After repeated demands to the ministry, it finally registered the party in February 2009.

In 2009, the party claimed to have 1100 members. Several local branches of the party were established, including one in London, established in May 2009.

It took part at the 2009 European Parliament election and received 6,961 votes (1.23% of the total). The party's vice-chairman, businessman and lawyer Arvydas Norvydas was put forth as a candidate in the presidential election in the same year, but cancelled his bid due to sickness.

In the 2011 municipal elections, the party won three seats (out of 27) in the council of the Klaipėda District Municipality and entered a coalition with Order and Justice. Egidijus Skarbalius, the party's chairman, was elected as the Vice-Mayor to Mayor Sigitas Karbauskas. However, this coalition was short-lived and was overthrown by a coalition of the Social Democratic Party and the Homeland Union after defections from the Order and Justice group in September.

=== Decline ===
Egidijus Skarbalius chose to participate in the 2012 parliamentary election as a candidate for the Way of Courage party. As he had not informed the party nor was the party in a cooperation agreement with Way of Courage, he was removed from his position as chairman and the party distanced themselves from him. However, he remained a member of the party. In the election, he received 5.94% of the vote in the Gargždai constituency and finished fifth.

The party retained its three council seats in Klaipėda District Municipality in the 2015 municipal elections, but failed to win any new seats. It did not contest the 2019 municipal elections and lost its seats as a result. The party's new chairman, Stasys Gaižauskas, was questioned on the party's potential dissolution due to lacking activity and membership, but denied that such a move is being considered. It once again participated in the 2023 municipal elections, but made the worst showing in its history, with only 741 votes.

The party is considered moribund and inactive.

The party decided to participate in the 2024 Lithuanian parliamentary election in a coalition together with the Lithuanian Christian Democracy Party.

== Political positions ==
The Samogitian Party wants Samogitia to be established as an autonomous region above the municipalities of Lithuania. In this region, Samogitian language would have official status and be protected, and Samogitians would have the right to declare their ethnic nationality. As this would, de facto, transform Lithuania into a federal state, the party struggled with registration in the Ministry of Justice, as this was interpreted as refusing to recognize the territorial integrity of the state.

The party's demands include recognition of Samogitia as a separate nation, and recognition of the Samogitian language as a separate language. The party's first chairman, Egidijus Skarbalius, described it as a centrist party which seeks to balance free-market economics and the social safety net. The party also pledges to protect 'family values'.

The party's candidates in municipal elections are often known for unorthodox campaign promises, such as promising to create a dub of The Simpsons and Teletubbies in the Samogitian dialect.

In 2012, as members of the "World Samogitian Gathering" (Lithuanian: Pasaulio Žemaičių sueiga), the party endorsed a resolution written by the pro-Russian organization and internet portal "Be United" (Lithuanian: Būkime vieningi), which called for a restoration of the Kingdom of Lithuania.

== Election results ==
=== Seimas ===
Election	Leader	Votes (Note: Proportional representation votes.)	%	Seats	+/–	Government
2024 (Note: Run as part of the Coalition of Peace (DP, LKDP and ŽP).)	Irena Stražinskaitė-Glinskienė	27,298	2.24 (#11)	0 / 141	New	Extra-parliamentary

=== European Parliament ===
Election	List leader	Votes	%	Seats	+/–	EP Group
2009	Egidijus Skarbalius	6.961	1.27 (#13)	0 / 12	New	–
2014	Did not contest			0 / 12	0	–
2019	Did not contest			0 / 12	0	–
2024 (Note: Run in a joint list with LKDP.)	Mindaugas Puidokas	23,777	3.51 (#12)	0 / 11	0	–

=== Municipal ===
Election	Votes (Note: Municipal council election votes.)	%	Council seats	Mayors	+/–
2011	4,147	0.37 (#18)	3 / 1,466	0 / 60	
2015	2,741	0.25 (#11)	3 / 1,473	0 / 60	0
2019	Did not compete	Did not compete	0 / 1,442	0 / 60	▼3
2023	741	0.06 (#17)	0 / 1,498	0 / 60	0
