= Lithuanian Christian Democracy Party =

Lithuanian Christian Democracy Party Lietuvos krikščioniškosios demokratijos partija
- Abbreviation: LKDP
- Leader: Mindaugas Puidokas
- Founders: Zigmas Zinkevičius; Alfonsas Svarinskas
- Founded: 28 January 2003
- Split from: Lithuanian Christian Democratic Party
- Headquarters: A. Goštauto g. 3-15, Vilnius
- Membership: 2,041
- Ideology: Christian democracy Social conservatism Russophilia (from 2024)
- Political position: Right-wing
- European affiliation: European Christian Political Party
- Colours
- Seimas: 0 / 141 (0%)
- European Parliament: 0 / 11 (0%)
- Municipal councils: 0 / 1,526
- Mayors: 0 / 60

The Lithuanian Christian Democracy Party (Note: A more accurate translation of the party's name would be Party of Christian Democracy, however, Christian Democracy Party is generally used in English versions of Lithuanian media. Christian Democratic Party is also used, but is generally reserved for the historical Lithuanian Christian Democratic Party.) (Lithuanian: Lietuvos krikščioniškosios demokratijos partija, LKDP) is a Christian democratic party in Lithuania founded in 2003. A right-wing party, it first acquired a Member of the Seimas in 2024, when Mindaugas Puidokas joined the party and was elected as its chairman.

It is a member of the European Christian Political Party.

== History ==
The party was founded in 2003, after members of the Lithuanian Christian Democratic Party left in protest of the leadership's decision of unify with the Christian Democratic Union, another Christian Democratic party. The newly founded party retained the original party's statute and program, but was unable to keep its name and thus adopted a slightly altered one. The party's formation was initiated by former Minister of Education Zigmas Zinkevičius and dissident and Catholic priest Alfonsas Svarinskas. They were opposed to cooperation with Kazys Bobelis, chairman of the Christian Democratic Union, who, according to them, had conspired with "kolchoz chairmen" (referring to the Democratic Labour Party of Lithuania) during municipal elections.

The party's first chairman was Ignacas Uždavinys, who remained until 2008. The party's next chairman, Vincentas Lamanauskas, joined the Christian Party in 2010. It first participated in the 2011 local elections and received 1199 votes, or 0.1 percent of the total vote. It performed worse in the 2019 local elections, where it only received 811 votes, or 0.09 percent of the total vote, and did not contest the 2023 local elections.

=== From 2024 ===
On 8 January 2024, Mindaugas Puidokas, former Member of the Seimas from the Labour Party, joined the party and was elected as its chairman. The party made the decision to contest Seimas and European Parliament elections for the first time in its history. Puidokas had resigned from the Labour Party in March 2022, after the party distanced himself from his comments on the 2022 Russian invasion of Ukraine, in which he blamed the outbreak of the war on NATO aggression.

On 22 January 2024, it endorsed Ignas Vėgėlė in the 2024 Lithuanian presidential election.

To contest the 2024 European Parliament election in Lithuania, the party formed a "Coalition of Peace" (Lithuanian: "Taikos koalicija") with the Samogitian Party and the team of failed 2024 presidential candidate Valdas Tutkus. The coalition's proclaimed goals are to oppose European integration and the deployment of Lithuanian soldiers in Ukraine, and defend traditional values.

== Platform ==
In its platform, the party ascribes itself to Christian democracy and Catholic social teaching. According to the party, the country has been taken over by "leftist political powers" which promote "gender ideology". Though it ascribes to the Roman Catholic Church, it extols Iceland as the example for Lithuania to follow.

After Puidokas's takeover of the party, its rhetoric has been described as supportive of Russia and peddling disinformation and conspiracy theories.

== Election results ==
=== Seimas ===
Election	Leader	Votes (Note: Proportional representation votes.)	%	Seats	+/–	Government
2024 (Note: Run as part of the Coalition of Peace (DP, LKDP and ŽP).)	Mindaugas Puidokas	27,298	2.24 (#11)	0 / 141	New	Extra-parliamentary

=== European Parliament ===
Election	List leader	Votes	%	Seats	+/–	EP Group
2024 (Note: Run in a joint list with ŽP.)	Mindaugas Puidokas	23,777	3.51 (#12)	0 / 11	New	–
