= Stasys Jakeliūnas =

Lithuanian politician

Stasys Jakeliūnas MEP
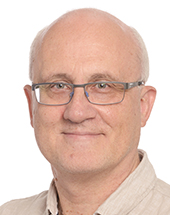

Member of European Parliament
- In office 2 July 2019 – 15 July 2024
- Constituency: Lithuania

Personal details
- Born: 2 October 1958 (age 67) Karaganda, Kazakh SSR
- Party: Lithuanian Regions Party
- Children: Kostas Jakeliūnas

Stasys Jakeliūnas (born 2 October 1958) is a Lithuanian politician. He was formerly an independent Member of the European Parliament (EP), who caucused for the Lithuanian Farmers and Greens Union. Jakeliūnas has previously spent one incomplete term as MP at the Lithuanian Seimas, having been elected in 2016.

== Controversy ==
Prior to his entry into politics as economic advisor to then-PM Algirdas Butkevičius Jakeliūnas was economist at Vilniaus taupomoji kasa, a credit union that became insolvent 3 years later; he mentioned it was “to be expected”.

In 2016 Jakeliūnas arranged a translation of Phishing for Phools:The Economics of Manipulation and Deception by Robert J. Shiller and George Akerlof as electoral promotion material paid for by the Farmers and Greens Union; he repeatedly positioned it as an endorsement from Robert Shiller, pointing to his Lithuanian roots.

Jakeliūnas' EP election process roused accusations of electoral fraud. He was elected when Šarūnas Marčiulionis, a former basketball player with no political experience, won the EP seat for the party but instantly resigned and gave up his seat in favor of Jakeliūnas; it transpired Marčiulionis never intended to take his seat to start with.

In 2019 Jakeliūnas was accused by governor of central Bank of Lithuania of asking to apply pressure on the fintech Revolut to leave Lithuania.

In September 2020 Jakeliūnas abstained in the parliamentary vote on support for the 2020–2021 Belarusian protests, attracting criticism from prime minister Saulius Skvernelis of the Farmers and Greens Union.

In December 2021 Jakeliūnas was among 6 MEPs punished for entering the parliament building without COVID-19 certificates in contravention of the rules in November 2021 which earned him the distinction of being added to Politico European Parliament's black book.

In February 2022 Jakeliūnas abstained in the parliamentary vote on support to Ukraine during the 2022 Russian invasion of Ukraine. In his comments to Lietuvos rytas he said that "support to Ukraine that does not take into account Russia's red lines is a danger to the entire world", "Russia is a nuclear state and cannot be won against", asked for consideration of Ukraine's "much closer historical, cultural, religious ties to Russia" than to Europe, and advocated neutrality for Ukraine. The Farmers and Greens Union distanced itself from Jakeliūnas position.

In November 2022 Jakeliūnas abstained in the parliamentary vote declaring Russia a state sponsor of terrorism that succeeded by a majority of 494 against 58, with 44 abstentions.

In February 2023 Jakeliūnas was interviewed by a YouTuber who had previously attracted attention in a public report from the State Security Department of Lithuania for his support for Russian propaganda, to whom he stated that questioning political status of Crimea was reminiscent of "fascistic methods" and proceeded to equate George W. Bush and Vladimir Putin as war criminals. Later same week he stated to LRT that Russia had been "partly provoked" to invade Ukraine.

In January 2024 Jakeliūnas expressed anti-Israeli statements bordering on anti-Semitic in a podcast.

In February 2024 Jakeliūnas defended an accused Russian spy and fellow MEP, Tatjana Ždanoka, condemning what he described as a “witch hunt akin to that in the Middle Ages.

In September 2024 Jakeliūnas accused the European Parliament for auditing his expenses 3 times in a single 5-year term as form of political retribution; he drew analogy between his case and that of Viktoras Uspaskich.

== Political career ==
During his incomplete term as MP Jakeliūnas initiated the impeachment process of Mykolas Majauskas.

Jakeliūnas ran for mayor of Vilnius in March 2023; he came 12th with 2,965, or 1.34%, of the vote.

Having announced he will not run for another term at the European Parliament in November 2023 after losing support of the LVŽS, he changed his mind and ran in 2024 for the Lithuanian Regions Party, which received 5.25% of the votes and no seats. He became a member of the party, for the first time in his political career, to be allowed to stand in the election.

Jakeliūnas planned to participate in the October 2024 elections to the Seimas on the Labour Party list led by the Russian-born Viktor Uspaskich who in 2021 was expelled from the Renew Europe group at the EP for calling LGBT people “perverts” who “must not be tolerated”.

In March 2024 the Labour Party was investigated by Financial Crime Investigation Service and European Anti-Fraud Office regarding €0.5m of misappropriated EU funds. According to an investigation by Transparency International, Uspaskich was the highest-earning MEP, pulling over €3m from “side gigs”. Uspaskich had in 2013 been given a 4-year jail term for his role in appropriation of state funds by his Labour Party.

Jakeliūnas ultimately did not run in the October 2024 parliamentary election. Taikos koalicija ("coalition for peace") of 3 parties that he authored electoral program for came 5th-last with 2.2% of the vote and 0 MP seats.

== History of frivolous litigation ==
In 2021 Lithuanian courts refused to accept Jakeliūnas' defamation lawsuit against Vitas Vasiliauskas, governor of the central Bank of Lithuania.

In 2021 General Court (European Union) declined to accept Jakeliūnas' lawsuit regarding alleged manipulation of the Vilibor interest rate.

In 2022 Lithuanian courts reiterated refusal to accept Jakeliūnas' lawsuit against the foreign minister Gabrielius Landsbergis regarding alleged intimidation of the Lithuanian Constitutional Court.

In 2022 Lithuanian courts reiterated their negative decision in Jakeliūnas' defamation lawsuit against Vitas Vasiliauskas.

In February 2024 Jakeliūnas asked police to investigate Algis Ramanauskas, a media personality, for alleged hate speech against people holding views favoring life in the pre-1990 Soviet Lithuania.
