= Dumsiai Forest =

Forest in Lithuania

Dumsiai Forest Lithuanian: Dumsių miškas
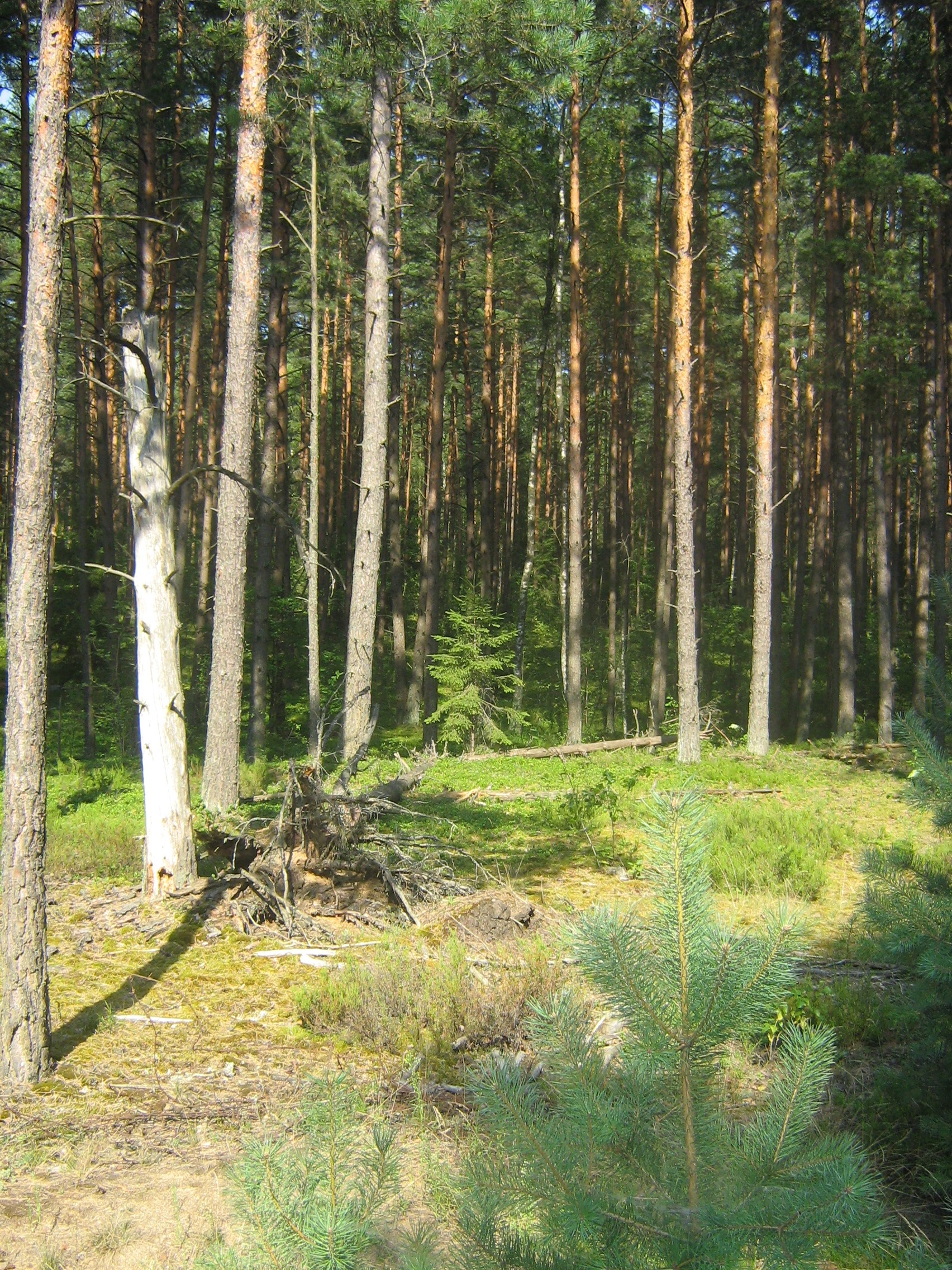
- Inside of the forest

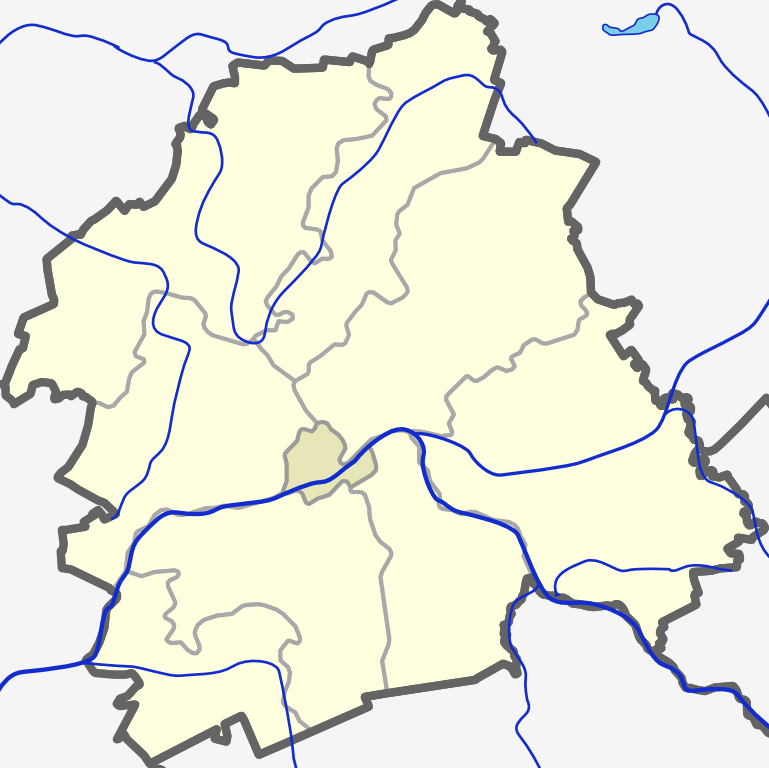
- Location within Jonava District Municipality Location within Lithuania
- Interactive map of Dumsiai Forest

Geography
- Location: Jonava District Municipality, Lithuania
- Coordinates: 55.0415°N 24.3166°E

Ecology
- Forest cover: birch, spruce, aspen

Dumsiai Forest (Lithuanian: Dumsių miškas) is a forest in Jonava District Municipality, central Lithuania. It covers area in Šveicarija Eldership. River Taurosta goes through the forest.

== Public attractions ==
The forest is the place for public hiking routes and rest areas. The longest hike route called Takas is the length of 1300 m.

Dumsiai Forest is also a location for abandoned military base.
