= Dainius Varnas =

Lithuanian politician (born 1971)

Member of the Seimas
- Incumbent
- Assumed office 14 November 2024

Personal details
- Born: 21 June 1971 (age 54)
- Party: Dawn of Nemunas (since 2024)
- Other political affiliations: Homeland Union (1999–2012); Freedom and Justice (2012–2016)

Dainius Varnas (born 21 June 1971) is a Lithuanian politician of the Dawn of Nemunas serving as a member of the Seimas since 2024. In the 2023 municipal elections, he was the candidate of Freedom and Justice for mayor of Kaunas.
