= Christian Union (Lithuania) =

Lithuanian political party

Christian Union Krikščionių sąjunga
- Abbreviation: KS
- Chairman: Rimantas Dagys
- Founded: 8 February 2020
- Split from: Homeland Union
- Headquarters: Kovo 11-osios g. 47-36, Grigiškės, Vilnius
- Membership: 2244 (2026)
- Ideology: Christian democracy Social conservatism
- Political position: Right-wing
- European affiliation: European Christian Political Party
- Colours: Gray; Orange
- Seimas: 0 / 141 (0%)
- European Parliament: 0 / 11 (0%)
- Municipal councils: 8 / 1,498
- Mayors: 0 / 60

Website
- krikscioniu.lt

Christian Union (Lithuanian: Krikščionių sąjunga) is a minor political party in Lithuania. It held its constituent congress on 8 February 2020.

The constituent congress elected the initiator of the party, Rimantas Dagys, its chairman. Member of Seimas Egidijus Vareikis, Signatory of the Act of March 11 Jonas Šimėnas, and several former members of the Seimas (including Petras Luomanas, Jonas Valatka, and Arvydas Akstinavičius) also became members of the party. Priest Robertas Grigas presided over a prayer in the congress.

Initially the party was meant to be named "Christian Union 'Harmony and Welfare'" (Lithuanian: Krikščionių sąjunga „Santarvė ir gerovė“), but the constituent congress has decided to shorten the name to "Christian Union" (Lithuanian: Krikščionių sąjunga).

The program adopted by the constituent congress claims that the party's "political activity is grounded in principles of Christian democracy and Christian social policy".

On 3 February 2024, it merged with the Lithuanian Family Movement. Since 2026, the party is undergoing reorganization that would lead to its liquidation, as it agreed to unite with the party Lithuania - For Everyone.

== Election results ==
=== Seimas ===
Election	Votes (Note: Proportional representation votes.)	%	Seats	+/–	Government
2020	8,825	0.78 (#15)	0 / 141	New	Extra-parliamentary

=== European Parliament ===
Election	List leader	Votes	%	Seats	+/–	EP Group
2024	Algimantas Rusteika	9,310	1.37 (#14)	0 / 11	New	–

=== Municipal ===
Election	Votes (Note: Municipal council election votes.)	%	Council seats	Mayors	+/–
2023	6,124	0.54 (#7)	8 / 1,498	0 / 60	-
