= Jonas Pinskus =

Lithuanian rower (born 1959)

Jonas Pinskus MP
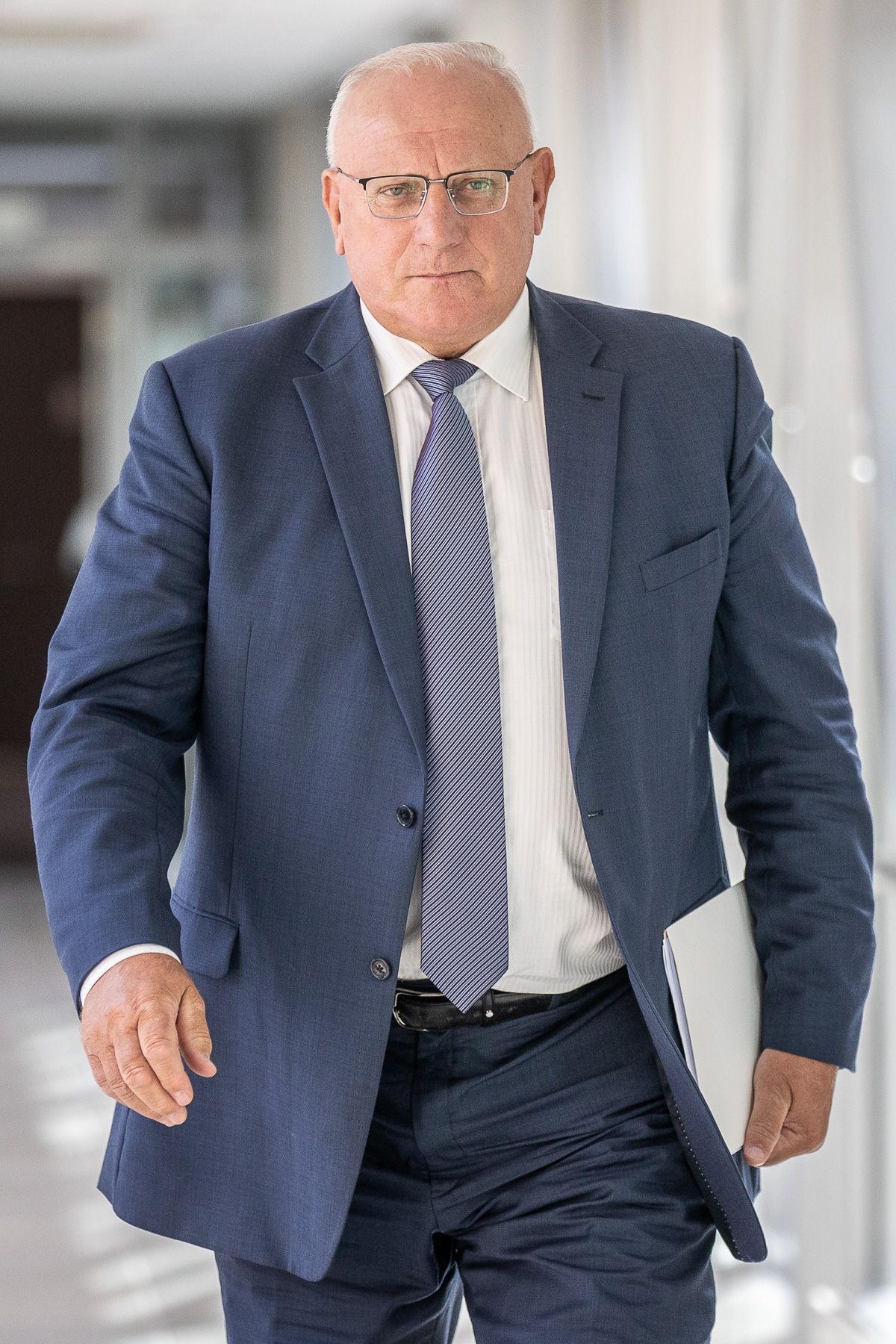

Member of Seimas
- In office 13 November 2020 – 14 November 2024
- Succeeded by: Indrė Kižienė (Deltuva South constituency)
- Constituency: Molėtai - Širvintos
- In office 21 December 2004 – 14 November 2008
- Constituency: Multi-member
- In office 7 July 2009 – 12 April 2011
- Preceded by: Viktor Uspaskich
- Succeeded by: Jonas Kondrotas

Personal details
- Born: 22 September 1959 (age 67) Kuršėnai, Lithuanian SSR, Soviet Union
- Party: Labour Party (2003–2017); Lithuanian Regions Party (since 2018)
- Spouse: Živilė Pinskuvienė
- Education: Vilnius University

Jonas Pinskus
Personal information
- Born: 22 September 1959 (age 67) Kuršėnai, Lithuanian SSR, Soviet Union
- Height: 190 cm (6 ft 3 in)
- Weight: 89 kg (196 lb)

Sport
- Sport: Rowing
Medal record
Men's rowing
Representing the Soviet Union
Olympic Games
Bronze medal – third place	1980 Moscow	Eight
Friendship Games
Gold medal – first place	1984 Moscow	Eight
World Rowing Championships
Silver medal – second place	1986 Nottingham	Eight

Jonas Pinskus (born 22 September 1959) is a Lithuanian politician and former competitive rower. He served as a member of the Seimas, Lithuania's parliament, during three periods between 2004 and 2024. He also competed for the Soviet Union in the 1980 Summer Olympics.

At the 1980 Summer Olympics, he was a crew member of the Soviet boat that won the bronze medal in the eight event. At the 1986 World Rowing Championships in Nottingham, he won a silver medal with the eight.

Seimas
Preceded by Petras Čimbaras	Member of the Seimas for Širvintos and Molėtai; 2020–present	Incumbent
