= Lithuanian Family Movement =

Right-wing conservative political movement

- Lietuvos šeimų sąjūdis
- Abbreviation: LŠS
- Formation: June 27, 2021; 5 years ago
- Founded at: Kaunas
- Type: Nonprofit
- Purpose: Limiting marriage to people of the opposite sex. Opposition to same-sex civil unions, adoption, the ratification of the Istanbul Convention, and "gender ideology".
- Location: Lithuania
- Region served: Europe
- Methods: Protests, demonstrations, reports, policy proposals
- Council: Raimondas Grinevičius; Algimantas Rusteika; Adelina Sabaliauskaitė; Vitolda Račkova; Arvydas Daunys; Artūras Orlauskas; Gitana Balčiūnienė; Kristina Stumbrienė; Antanas Norvydas; Daiva Narkevičiūtė; Laura Lodienė; Andrius Galkinas; Jonas Gedvilas; Tomas Senūta; Egidijus Visockas
- Website: seimusajudis.lt (in Lithuanian)

Lithuanian Family Movement (Lithuanian: Lietuvos šeimų sąjūdis, LŠS; Lithuanian pronunciation: [ɛɫˈɛʃˈɛs]) is a right-wing traditionalist anti-gender political movement in Lithuania. The primary focus of the movement is voicing out their opposition for bills it mostly considers to be a threat to the traditional nuclear family, the well-being of children, and society at large, such as the legalization of same-sex civil unions, same-sex marriages, decriminalisation of drugs, ratification of Istanbul Convention or vaccine passports. The Lithuanian Family Movement was founded on June 27, 2021, as a response to the Homeland Union, a liberal conservative party that received the majority of votes in the 2020 parliamentary election and formed a coalition with the liberal Freedom Party, began promoting LGBT-friendly policies. Some people involved in the movement resorted to violence during civil protests. However, the protest's key denied such allegiations, claiming they were staged provocations.

During a protest organized by the Lithuanian Family Movement, there was some booing of the Lithuanian politicians Viktorija Čmilytė-Nielsen and Ingrida Šimonytė as well as a former anti-Soviet dissident Sr. Bernadeta Mališkaitė at an honorary public event to commemorate January 13 in 2022. Soon thereafter, the movement stated in an open letter that "We regret the individual disrespectful outbursts" during Mališkaitė's speech and that "the negative reaction was not aimed at the defenders of freedom or the events of January 13th, but at politicians".

On 3 February 2024, it merged with the Christian conservative Christian Union, and representatives of the Lithuanian Family Movement — Edita Aleksandravičė, Artūras Orlauskas, Vitolda Račkova, Tomas Senūta, Egidijus Visockas — were elected to the party's executive committee. The unified party adopted a Christian right, soft Eurosceptic platform.

== Movement structure and ideology ==
The Lithuanian Family Movement is a unified sociopolitical entity with Raimondas Grinevičius alongside the Council of other nine members serving as its primary leadership. The movement organises a march, known as the Great Family Defense March (Lithuanian: Didysis šeimų gynimo maršas), annually. According to one of the founders Arturas Orlauskas, the purpose of such nationwide gatherings is "to protect the Lithuanian state from anticonstitutional actions, which violate the basic rights and freedoms of the society." They are also organized to "defend our country's children, the youth, families, and schools from the harmful influence of sexual minorities"

=== Relations with foreign partners ===
The movement has been strengthening its ties with other European anti-gender groups and government officials in countries such as Poland, Hungary, Italy, Germany, and Ireland. On September 1, 2021, the former Hungarian Minister of Family Affairs, Katalin Novák, congratulated and expressed her support to the Lithuanian Family Movement in an official written address to the Chairman of the Council and the Lithuanian people. Soon after, Irish senator Rónán Mullen congratulated the movement for fighting for "a society where every person is being respected and is striving for common good." In 2022, Florio Scifo, the World Youth Alliance coordinator of Italy, sympathised with the movement participants of the annual march. On June 13–14, 2022, a delegation from the Lithuanian Family Movement held a meeting with the management of the Polish Catholic organisation Ordo Iuris and officially agreed on further cooperation. Other notable honorary guests include a far-right German politician Steffen Kotré.

Even though Marius Gabrilavičius, a chief editor of the pro-Russian website minfo.lt, claimed to have been one of the organisers of the Great Family Defense March, Raimondas Grinevičius denied the link between Gabrilavičius and his organisation.
