= Public election committee (Lithuania) =

In Lithuania, a political committee, sometimes called as an electoral committee and also translated as public election committee (Lithuanian: visuomeninis rinkimų komitetas), is an organized group outside of political parties which participates in local or European Parliament elections.

In 2023, 11 mayors (of 60) and 183 municipal council members (of 1498) were elected from political committees. 4 of Lithuania's 5 largest cities elected a mayor belonging to a committee. The strongest committee is Vieningas Kaunas, led by Visvaldas Matijošaitis, which has dominated local elections in Kaunas since the introduction of committees in 2015. During the 2019 European Parliament election in Lithuania, one of the seats was won by a public election committee led by Aušra Maldeikienė.

The prominence of political committees has been described as the result of an ongoing crisis of confidence in political parties in Lithuania.

== Establishment ==
A public electoral committee is established by voters who reside in the municipality in which candidates are standing. The number of electors must be at least twice the number of total members of the municipality's council or Lithuania's delegation to the European Parliament. A person may be a member of only sole election committee or political party at any time. A committee is set up for the purpose of participating in a specific election, by means of an electoral committee operating agreement signed by all members of the electoral committee. The operating agreement of the election committee is approved by the Central Electoral Commission.

A committee ceases being active once the election it was established to participate in ends. However, certain committees operate beyond elections in non-official means or have parallel organizations. As an example, Vieningas Kaunas has existed as a public organization of Kaunas citizens since 2010.

Like political parties, political committees are required to pay an election deposit and collect a required number of signatures to participate in their election of choice. However, the establishment and operation of committees is simpler compared to political parties - parties require a minimum of 2000 signatures to be established, whereas a committee only requires a small number (only 22 for European Parliament elections). On the other hand, parties can be financed from the state budget, collect membership fees and take on debt, whereas committees can only be financed by donations or by the candidates themselves.

== History ==
Until 2015, mayoral elections in municipalities in Lithuania were indirect and only political parties could participate in local elections. On 24 December 2002, the Constitutional Court of Lithuania made a ruling that electoral laws in Lithuania must create the possibility for non-partisan candidates to participate in local elections. On 9 November 2010, the court made a similar ruling that existing laws on elections to the European Parliament violate the Constitution by allowing only political parties to compete. In 2013, the Seimas amended European Parliament electoral law to allow the establishment of public election committees. Committees were also introduced ahead of the 2015 local elections, alongside the introduction of direct mayoral elections.

== List of committees ==
=== Local ===
The following is a list of political committees which participated in the 2023 Lithuanian municipal elections.

==== Committees represented in mayoral offices ====
The following committees won the direct mayoral election in their municipality.

Municipality	Committee	Mayor	Council seats
Kaunas City	United Kaunas; Vieningas Kaunas	Visvaldas Matijošaitis	26 / 41
Šiauliai City	Non-Partisan List "Working for the City"; Nepartinis sąrašas „Dirbame miestui“	Artūras Visockas	18 / 31
Druskininkai	For Druskininkai; Už Druskininkus	Ričardas Malinauskas	17 / 25
Panevėžys City	For a Renewing Panevėžys; Atsinaujinančiam Panevėžiui	Rytis Mykolas Račkauskas	15 / 27
Kazlų Rūda	Young Kazlų Rūda; Jaunoji Kazlų Rūda	Mantas Varaška	13 / 21
Kretinga	Kretinga Region; Kretingos kraštas	Antanas Kalnius	11 / 25
Utena	Together for the Utena Region; Kartu už Utenos kraštą	Marijus Kaukėnas	9 / 25
Varėna	Together with You; Drauge su Jumis	Algis Kašėta	9 / 25
Klaipėda City	Loyal to Klaipėda; Ištikimi Klaipėdai	Arvydas Vaitkus	8 / 31
Šilalė	For the Šilalė Region; Vardan Šilalės krašto	Tadas Bartkus	5 / 25
Kalvarija	Let's Strive Together; Siekime kartu	Nerijus Šidlauskas	3 / 21

==== Committees not represented in mayoral offices ====
The following committees did not win the direct mayoral election in their municipality.

Alytus District Municipality

- For Alytus (Už Alytų)

Biržai District Municipality

- Revival of Biržai (Biržų atgimimas)

Elektrėnai Municipality

- Non-Partisan Local Government (Nepartinė savivalda)

Jonava District Municipality

- Our Jonava (Mūsų Jonava)

Jurbarkas District Municipality

- Your Vote For the Jurbarkas Region (Tavo balsas už Jurbarko kraštą)

Klaipėda District Municipality

- Better Together (Bendrai geriau)

Kretinga District Municipality

- For a Bright Kretinga (Už šviesią Kretingą)

Molėtai District Municipality

- Molėtai Together (Molėtai kartu)

Panevėžys City Municipality

- For the Good of Panevėžys (Panevėžio labui)

Plungė District Municipality

- United Plungė (Vieninga Plungė)

Raseiniai District Municipality

- For You, Countryman! (Tau, kraštieti!)
- Samogitian of Raseiniai (Raseinių žemaitis)

Skuodas District Municipality

- Together We Can (Kartu mes galime)

Šakiai District Municipality

- United Zanavykai (Vieningi zanavykai)

Šiauliai City Municipality

- For the Good of Šiauliai! (Šiaulių labui!)

Šilalė District Municipality

- Šilalė Centrists (Šilalės centristai)

Utena District Municipality

- Strong Utena (Stipri Utena)

Varėna District Municipality

- Let's Turn to the Human Being (Atsigręžkime į žmogų)

Vilkaviškis District Municipality

- New Start for the Vilkaviškis Region (Naujas startas Vilkaviškio kraštui)

Zarasai District Municipality

- Create for Zarasai (Kurk Zarasams)
- Clean Local Government (Švari savivalda)

== See also ==
- Politics of Lithuania
- List of political parties in Lithuania
