= Gulbiniškiai =

- Village
- Location in Lithuania
- Coordinates: 55°02′00″N 24°14′30″E
- Country: Lithuania
- County: Kaunas County
- Municipality: Jonava district municipality
- Eldership: Dumsiai eldership

Population (2011)
  - Total: 223
- Time zone: UTC+2 (EET)
  - Summer (DST): UTC+3 (EEST)

Gulbiniškiai is a village in Jonava district municipality, in Kaunas County, central Lithuania. According to the 2011 census, the town has a population of 223 people.

During Soviet Union era in village was built a rockets base.
