= Živilė Pinskuvienė =

Lithuanian politician

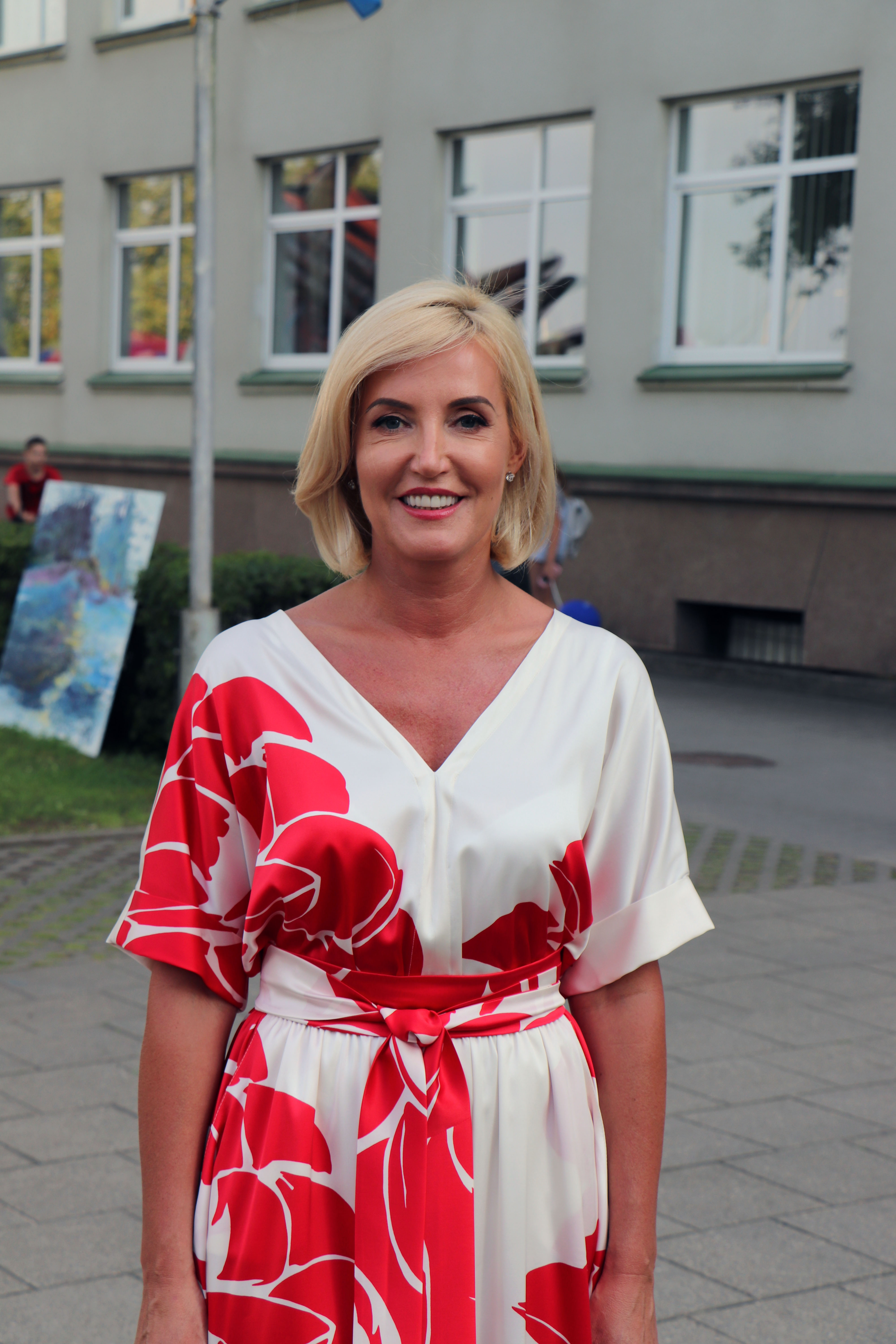

Mayor of Širvintos District Municipality
- Incumbent
- Assumed office 7 June 2015
- Preceded by: Vincas Jasiukevičius

Personal details
- Born: Živilė Gudonytė; 21 February 1975 (age 51) Širvintos, Vilnius County, Lithuania
- Party: Labour Party (2003-2017); Lithuanian Regions Party (since 2022)
- Spouse: Jonas Pinskus

Živilė Pinskuvienė (née Gudonytė) (born 21 February 1975) is a Lithuanian engineer, politician and Mayor of Širvintos District Municipality since 2015. She was the chairwoman of the Labour Party from 2016 to 2017.

== Biography ==
Pinskuvienė graduated from Širvintos 1st Secondary School, and from Vilnius Gediminas Technical University as a Master of Environmental Engineering in 2003. She was the chief executive officer of Danielita from 2004 to 2005 and later worked in other roles in the company.

From 2003 to 2017, she was a member of the Labour Party and chaired the party's Širvintos branch. From 2005 to 2006, she was an advisor to Minister of Economy Kęstutis Daukšys and director of Širvintos District Municipality administration from 2006 to 2007, dismissed following a vote of no confidence by the municipal council. Since 2011, she is a member of the municipal council of Širvintos District Municipality.

Pinskuvienė was elected as a Member of the Seimas in 2012, but was expelled by the Constitutional Court on allegations of electoral bribery. Afterwards, she was appointed as Vice-Minister of Agriculture to Minister Vigilijus Jukna, after the Social Democratic ministers in the Butkevičius Cabinet refused to accept her in their ministries.

In the first direct mayoral elections in Lithuania in 2015, Pinskuvienė won the mayoral election in Širvintos against Social Democrat candidate Andrius Jozonis with 55% of the vote. The results of the election were annulled by the Ukmergė district court after allegations that Pinskuvienė's team attempted to use electoral bribery during the vote. Pinskuvienė won the repeat elections in the first round with 68% of the vote.

After leaving the Labour Party in 2017, Pinskuvienė formed an electoral committee, named "Živilė Pinskuvienė's team – for a successful Širvintos region" (Lithuanian: Živilės Pinskuvienės komanda – už sėkmingą Širvintų kraštą). She won the 2019 mayoral election with 72% of the vote and her committee acquired a supermajority in the Širvintos municipal council. In 2023, she won 80% of the vote and was elected for a third term.

In 2022, Pinskuvienė and her committee joined her husband Jonas Pinskus's Lithuanian Regions Party.
