= Vytautas Juozapaitis =

Lithuanian politician

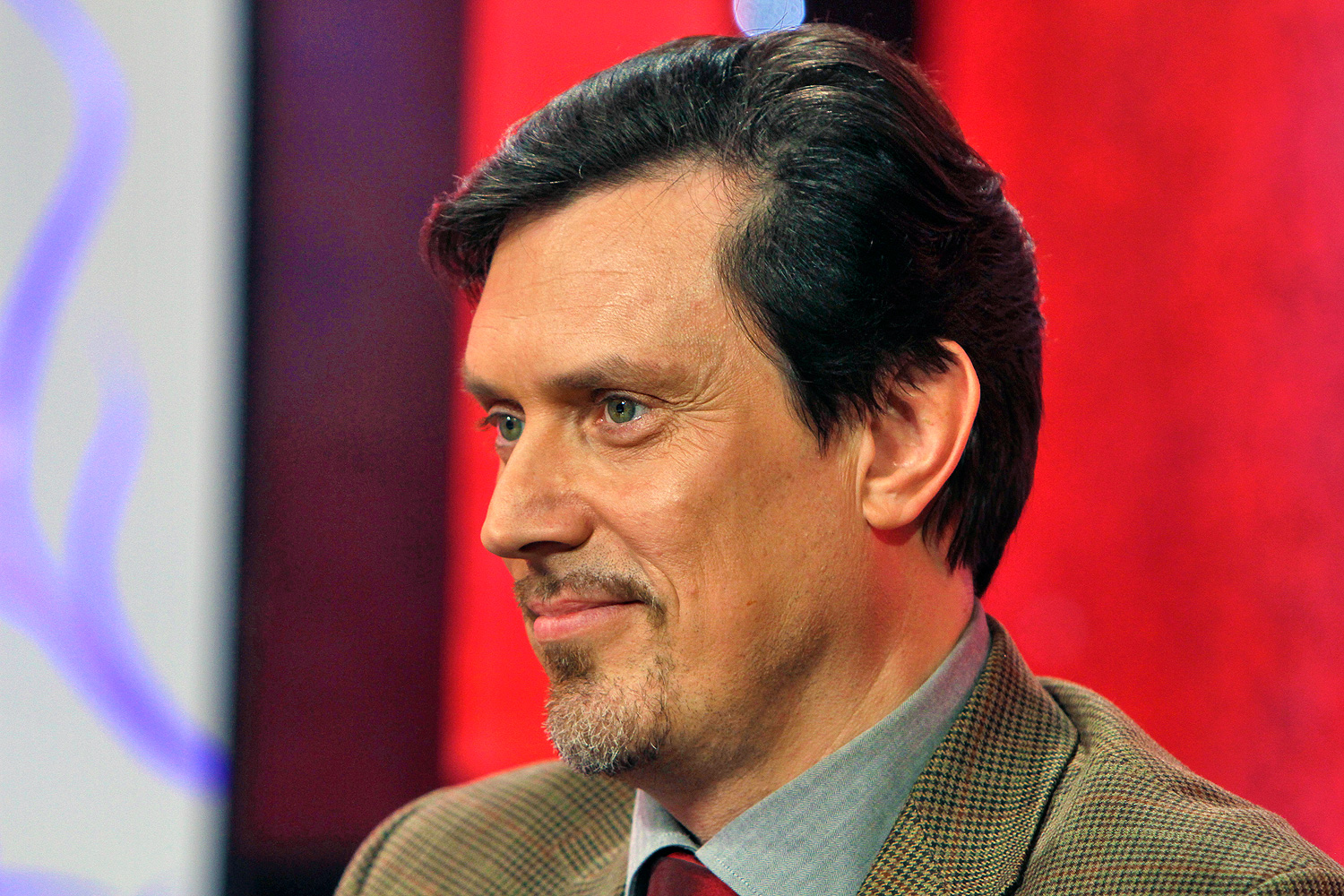

Member of the Seimas
- In office 13 November 2020 – 13 November 2024
- Preceded by: Mindaugas Puidokas
- Succeeded by: Robertas Kaunas
- Constituency: Aleksotas - Vilijampolė
- In office 16 November 2012 – 12 November 2020
- Constituency: Multi-member

Personal details
- Born: 14 December 1963 (age 62) Radviliškis, Lithuania
- Party: Homeland Union
- Education: Lithuanian Academy of Music and Theatre
- Profession: Opera singer

Vytautas Juozapaitis
- Genres: Opera, operetta, musical, classical music
- Occupations: Vocalist, opera singer, theatre actor, pedagogue, TV host
- Instruments: Vocals, piano, drums
- Years active: 1986–present
- Website: http://www.vytautasjuozapaitis.lt

Vytautas Juozapaitis (born 14 December 1963 in Radviliskis, Lithuania) is a Lithuanian singer (baritone), recipient of Lithuanian National Prize, a soloist of Lithuanian National Opera and Ballet Theatre and Kaunas State Musical Theatre, a professor of Lithuanian Academy of Music and Theatre and a docent of Vilnius College of Higher Education, and a television personality. He has performed in many international venues and is considered the most famous contemporary Lithuanian baritone.

== Biography ==
After graduating Lithuanian Academy of Music (in the class of Professor Vladimiras Prudnikovas) in 1989, Juozapaitis debuted in the role of Freddie in My Fair Lady and soon moved on to prominence, becoming one of the leading opera soloists of Lithuania.

He has been a soloist at the Lithuanian National Opera and Ballet Theatre since 1990 and at the Kaunas State Musical Theatre since 1989. He also collaborates with Klaipėda State Musical Theatre and appears in other subsidiary projects.

In 1992 and 1993, he studied at the European Center for Opera and Voice (ECOV) in Belgium, then with Marlena Malas in New York City, United States and baritone Tom Krause in Finland. He sang in Don Giovanni at the Czech National Opera Theatre in Prague, and toured with his company in Japan during 1994 and 1995, as well with company Teatro Lirico D'Europa in the US in 2003. In 2005 he worked in the Gran Teatre del Liceu in Barcelona, Spain, as the opera manager.

In addition to working as a performer, Juozapaitis has been teaching vocal performance since 1996 at his alma mater, now the Lithuanian Academy of Music and Theatre, and also at the Vilnius College from 2006. Among his graduate students are some prominent Lithuanian opera singers like tenor Edmundas Seilius and baritone Dainius Stumbras. In 2009, Juozapaitis opened his personal educational centre of culture and art called the Vytauto Juozapaičio kultūros ir meno centras.

He continues to perform in Lithuania and abroad; he has toured in Austria, the Netherlands, Belgium, Czech Republic, India, Nepal, Norway, Poland, United States, Spain, Russia, Germany, Latvia, Estonia, Finland and Canada. He has participated in many Lithuanian and foreign music festivals such as Savonlinna Opera Festival in Finland, Classic Openair Solothurn in Switzerland, the Beijing Music Festival in China, the Salzburg Festival in Austria, the International Festival of Oratorio and Cantata Music in Wrocław, Poland, the Montpellier Festival and the Haydn–Schubert Festival in Vilnius, and cooperated with Lithuanian and famous foreign conductors: Mstislav Rostropovich, Justus Franz, Pinchas Steinberg, Eduard Müller, David Agler, Christoph von Dohnanyi, Krzysztof Penderecki, and many others; directors – Anthony Minghella, Chen Shi-Zheng, Emilio Sagi, Francesca Zambello, Monika Wiesler, Silviu Purcarete, Jurij Aleksandrov, Jonas Jurašas, Gintaras Varnas, Dalia Ibelhauptaitė, Raimundas Banionis, Gintas Žilys and others.

Juozapaitis became a laureate at the 1980 Dainų dainelė competition and in 1992 won the 1st prize in the Competition of Lithuanian Vocalists. In 1993, he was awarded a diploma at the International Luciano Pavarotti Vocal Competition in Philadelphia (where the chairman was Pavarotti himself). Later he won all the major prizes of Lithuanian theatre scene, including three Opera Soloist of the Year awards, 2 Public's Favorite, Kipras, Kristoforas, Auksinis scenos kryžius (The Golden Cross of Scene) and the Officer's Cross of the Order for Merits to Lithuania. In recognition of his achievements, he was awarded the Lithuanian National Prize for Culture and Arts in 2003.

Maestro Juozapaitis has also worked as a television host (of the classical music show Tegyvuoja klasika! ["Long live the classics!"]), a chairman of judges in 2 music competition shows, Žvaigzdžių duetai (an analogue to Celebrity Duets) and Triumfo arka ("Triumphal arch", a contest of opera singers), and also one of its formers, on 2 Lithuanian TV channels, LTV and LNK. He has also released 3 solo CDs.

Married for the second time in 1988, has 3 daughters—Vaiva, Vaida (an adopted daughter from wife's first marriage) and Ieva.

== Roles ==
Lithuanian composers has written some roles specifically for V. Juozapaitis: Count Shemeta – in Broniaus Kutavičiaus opera Lokys, King Mindaugas – in Broniaus Kutavičiaus opera Ugnis ir tikėjimas, Žilvinas – in Audronė Žigaitytė opera Žilvinas ir Eglė and Žygimantas Augustas – in Giedrius Kuprevičius opera Karalienė Bona.

V. Juozapaitis' repertoire includes almost 50 major baritone roles in operas, operettas and musicals. Most famous of them:

- Don Giovanni – in Wolfgang Amadeus Mozart opera Don Giovanni
- Rigoletto – in Giuseppe Verdi opera Rigoletto
- Figaro – in Gioachino Rossini opera The Barber of Seville
- Escamilllo – in Georges Bizet opera Carmen
- Germont, Barone Douphol – in Giuseppe Verdi opera La Traviata
- Don Carlos, Marquis of Posa – in Giuseppe Verdi opera Don Carlos
- Prince Ypsheim – in Johann Strauss operetta Wiener Blut
- Sharpless – in Giacomo Puccini opera Madama Butterfly
- Enrico – in Gaetano Donizetti opera Lucia di Lammermoor
- Scarpia – in Giacomo Puccini opera Tosca
- Gianni Schicchi – in Giacomo Puccini opera Gianni Schicchi
- Amonasro – in Giuseppe Verdi opera Aida
- Valentino – in Charles Gounod opera Faust
- Prince Yeletsky – in Pyotr Tchaikovsky opera The Queen of Spades
- Wolfram – in Richard Wagner opera Tannhäuser
- Guglielmo – in Wolfgang Amadeus Mozart opera Così fan tutte
- Renato – in Giuseppe Verdi opera Un ballo in maschera
- Ping – in Giacomo Puccini opera Turandot
- Don Carlo – in Giuseppe Verdi opera La forza del destino
- Pilot – in Rachel Portman opera The Little Prince
- Paganini – in Franz Lehár operetta Paganini
- Freddie – in Frederick Loewe musical My Fair Lady
- Homonay – in Johann Strauss operetta The Gypsy Baron
- Don Alvaro – in Gioachino Rossini opera Il viaggio a Reims
- Duke Guido – in Johann Strauss operetta Eine Nacht in Venedig
- Plunkett – in Friedrich von Flotow opera Martha
- Delaura – in Peter Eötvös opera Love and Other Demons
- Frollo – in Richard Cocciante musical Notre Dame de Paris
- Gérard – in Umberto Giordano opera Andrea Chénier
- Arnoldo – in Amilcare Ponchielli opera I Lituani
- Pontius Pilate – in Tim Rice and Andrew Lloyd Webber rock opera Jesus Christ Superstar
- Count Almaviva – in Wolfgang Amadeus Mozart opera The Marriage of Figaro

V. Juozapaitis also has sung in many oratories including Carmina Burana by Carl Orff, Ein deutsches Requiem by Brahms, Stabat Mater by Franz Schubert, Era di Aguarius by Sofia Gubaidulina or War Requiem by Benjamin Britten.

== Discography ==
- 2004 – Negaliu Nemylėti (I Can't Help Falling In Love)
- 2005 – Baritonas (Baritone)
- 2008 – Neprarask Vilties (Don't Lose Hope)

Seimas
Preceded by Mindaugas Puidokas	Member of the Seimas for Aleksotas and Vilijampolė; 2020–present	Incumbent
