= Šveicarija =

- Village
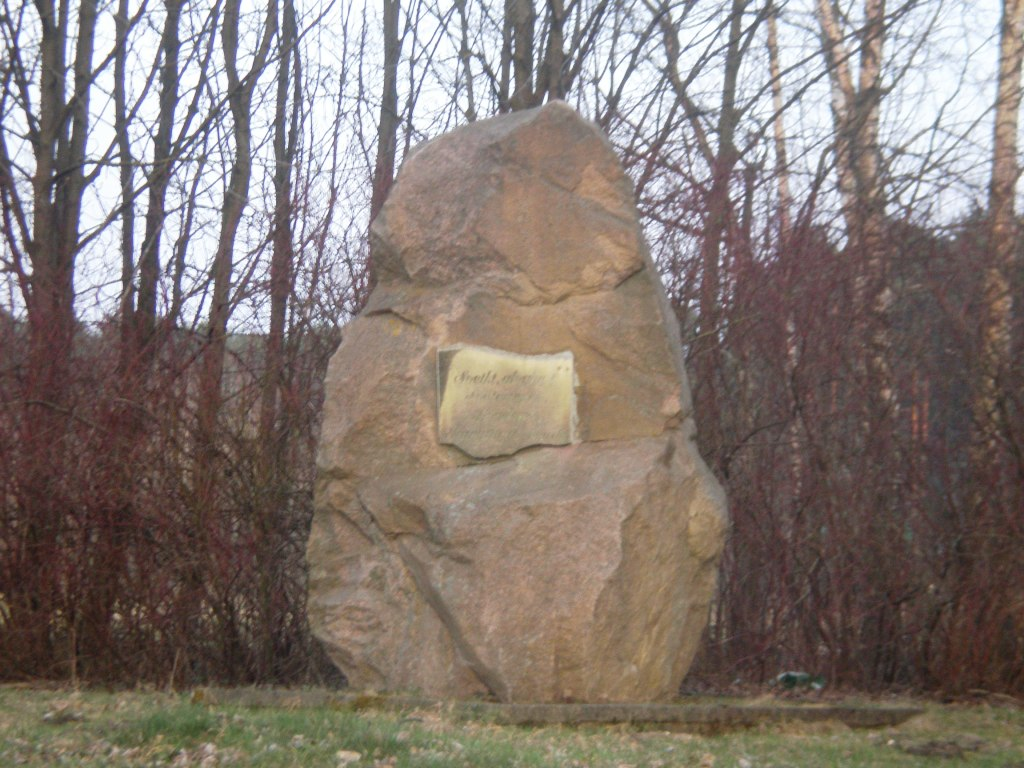

- Location within Lithuania
- Coordinates: 55°02′50″N 24°15′40″E
- Country: Lithuania
- County: Kaunas County
- Municipality: Jonava

Population (2011)
  - Total: 812
- Time zone: UTC+2 (EET)
  - Summer (DST): UTC+3 (EEST)

Šveicarija is a village in Jonava district municipality, in Kaunas County, in central Lithuania. According to the 2011 census, the village has a population of 812 people. The village's name means "Switzerland" in Lithuanian.

The village has a primary school, a library, a post office (ZIP code: 55041), a chapel, a sports center, a kindergarten, and a culture center.
