= Jonas Šimėnas =

Lithuanian politician (1953–2023)

Jonas Šimėnas (31 July 1953 – 15 March 2023) was a Lithuanian politician. In 1990 he was among those who signed the Act of the Re-Establishment of the State of Lithuania.

Šimėnas died on 15 March 2023, at the age of 69.

== Sources ==
- Biography (in Lithuanian)
