= Mindaugas Puidokas =

Lithuanian politician and journalist (born 1979)

Member of the Seimas
- In office 13 November 2020 – 2024
- Constituency: Multi-member
- In office 14 November 2016 – 12 November 2020
- Preceded by: Rytas Kupčinskas
- Succeeded by: Vytautas Juozapaitis
- Constituency: Aleksotas - Vilijampolė

Personal details
- Born: 19 March 1979 (age 47) Kaunas, Soviet Union (now Lithuania)
- Party: Lithuanian Christian Democracy Party (2024-present)
- Other political affiliations: Farmers and Greens Union (2016-2019); Labour Party (2019-2022)
- Education: Vytautas Magnus University

Mindaugas Puidokas (born 19 March 1979) is a Lithuanian politician, 2020 draft winner and journalist. He was an independent candidate for the 2019 Lithuanian presidential election.

== Biography ==
He graduated from the Sports University, Kaunas, in 1999.

In 1996 won European Youth Basketball Championship together with stars like Šarūnas Jasikevičius.

In 1995–1999, he was a correspondent for the newspapers Kauno diena, Kauno žinios, Vytautas Magnus.

Since 2016, he is a member of the Lithuanian Seimas. He is one of the 9 candidates for the 2019 presidential election on 12 May 2019.

Seimas
Preceded by Rytas Kupčinskas	Member of the Seimas for Aleksotas and Vilijampolė; 2016–2020	Succeeded by Vytautas Juozapaitis
