= Lithuanian Regions Party =

Lithuanian political party

Lithuanian Regions Party Lietuvos regionų partija
- Abbreviation: LRP
- Chairperson: Giedrė Pavasarytė
- Vice Chairpeople: Juozas Bernatonis; Ingrida Baltrušytė-Četrauskienė; Petras Čimbaras; Kęstutis Daukšys; Elvinas Jankevičius; Andrius Palionis; Živilė Pinskuvienė; Andrius Šedžius
- Founder: Gediminas Kirkilas
- Founded: 13 April 2018 (LSDDP); 29 July 2021 (LRP)
- Split from: Social Democratic Party of Lithuania
- Headquarters: Vilnius
- Ideology: Social democracy Regionalism; Social conservatism
- Political position: Left-wing
- Colours: Yellow
- Seimas: 0 / 141
- European Parliament: 0 / 11
- Municipal councils: 56 / 1,498

Website
- regionupartija.lt

The Lithuanian Regions Party (Lithuanian: Lietuvos regionų partija, LRP), also translated as the Lithuanian Party of Regions, is a political party in Lithuania. It was founded in 2018 as the Social Democratic Labour Party of Lithuania (Lithuanian: Lietuvos socialdemokratų darbo partija, LSDDP) following a split of members from Social Democratic Party of Lithuania (LSDP; also joined by former members of the Labour Party) after the LSDP's decision to exit a coalition government with the Lithuanian Farmers and Greens Union in 2017.

== History ==
Party logo until name change in June 2021

The party was a junior partner in government in the Seimas, Lithuania's unicameral Parliament, from 2018 to 2020. At the time, the LSDDP had 50 sections.

The party scored badly in the 2019 European Parliament election, scoring only 2.4% of votes and failing to elect any MEP. The party won slightly over 3% of the popular vote and 3 seats in the 2020 parliamentary election (only one MP, Andrius Palionis, was reelected). By this, the party became eligible to state dotation, but it was not allowed to form a separate parliamentary group, as a minimum of seven MPs are required for its formation. To do so, the LSDDP aligned with the Electoral Action of Poles in Lithuania, Freedom and Justice (formerly Order and Justice) and independent right-wing deputies Petras Gražulis and Valdemaras Valkiūnas to form the Lithuanian Group of Regions (Lithuanian: Lietuvos regionų frakcija).

In July 2021, the party adopted the name Lithuanian Regions Party. Jonas Pinskus, a former member of the Labour Party who joined the LSDDP in 2018, was elected chairman. He emphasized taking the party to a regionalist direction and emphasized growing differences between the Regions Party and LSDP.

Pinskus' wife and Mayor of Širvintos, Živilė Pinskuvienė, joined the Regions Party alongside her electoral committee "Živilė Pinskuvienė's team – for a successful Širvintos region" (Lithuanian: Živilės Pinskuvienės komanda – už sėkmingą Širvintų kraštą) in 2022. The Regions Party gained 73% of the vote in Širvintos in the 2023 Lithuanian local elections, the only municipality in which the party earned the largest share of the vote.

== Political positions ==
In its party program, the Regions Party describes itself as a centre-left political party. Political science journals, such as Geographia Polonica and the Robert Schuman Centre for Advanced Studies, classified the party as left-wing. It supports decentralization of the political system, a social market economy, and a stronger social safety net but at the same time supports the formation of additional free economic zones in poorer Lithuanian regions. It opposes further European integration. The Regions Party is a supporter of the right-wing, anti-LGBT, and traditionalist Lithuanian Family Movement, and participates in their protests and demonstrations. It initiated an attempt to ban "LGBT propaganda" in the Prienai District Municipality in 2023; this proposal did not receive support from the local council. Six of their original deputies were part of the similarly named post-communist Democratic Labour Party of Lithuania (LDDP).

== Election results ==
=== Seimas ===
Election	Leader	Votes (Note: Proportional representation votes.)	%	Seats	+/–	Government
2020	Gediminas Kirkilas	37,198	3.28 (#8)	3 / 141	New	Opposition
2024	Jonas Pinskus	23,547	1.93 (#12)	0 / 141	▼3	Extra-parliamentary

=== European Parliament ===
Election	List leader	Votes	%	Seats	+/–	EP Group
2019	Gediminas Kirkilas	29,592	2.36 (#12)	0 / 11	New	–
2024	Živilė Pinskuvienė	35,596	5.25 (#9)	0 / 11	0	–

=== Municipal ===
Election	Votes (Note: Municipal council election votes.)	%	Council seats	Mayors	+/–
2019	19,591	1.73 (#9)	24 / 1,442	0 / 60	-
2023	28,927	2.47 (#7)	56 / 1,498	1 / 60	▲33

== Chairmen ==
- Gediminas Kirkilas – 2018–2021
- Jonas Pinskus – from 2021
