= Visvaldas Matijošaitis =

Lithuanian politician (b. 1957)

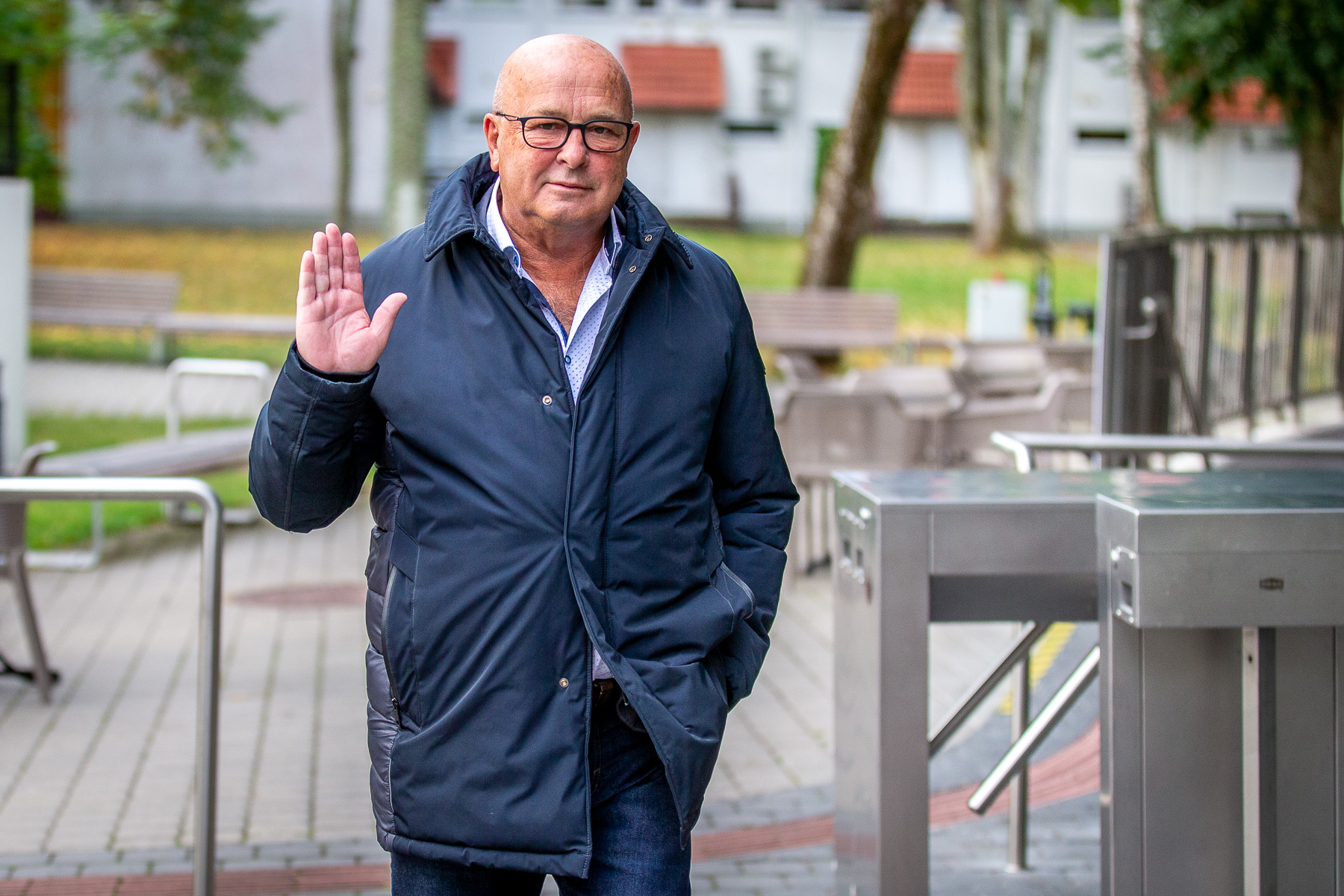
- Matijošaitis in 2015

Mayor of Kaunas
- Incumbent
- Assumed office 15 April 2015
- President: Gitanas Nausėda
- Deputy: Tomas Jarusevičius; Mantas Jurgutis; Andrius Palionis
- Preceded by: Andrius Kupčinskas

Member of the Kaunas City Council
- In office 27 March 2011 – 15 April 2015
- In office February 2015 – April 2015
- Preceded by: Viktoras Gediminas Gruodis
- Succeeded by: Romualdas Bakutis

Personal details
- Born: 14 April 1957 (age 69) Kaunas, Lithuanian SSR, USSR
- Party: United Kaunas
- Domestic partner: Loreta Stonkienė
- Children: Šarūnas, Dainius
- Parent(s): Bronislava Matijošaitienė, Kazimieras Matijošaitis
- Education: Vilnius Civil Engineering Institute
- Profession: , member of the Kaunas City Council

Visvaldas Matijošaitis (Lithuanian: [vʲɪs'vɐɫd̪ɐs mɐtʲɪˈjoʃɐɪ̯tʲɪs]; born 14 April 1957) is a Lithuanian politician, leader, founder, and chairman of Vieningas Kaunas, chairman for Mentor Lietuva Asociacija, president at Žalgirio Fondas Asociacija,. He founded Vičiūnų grupė in Vičiūnai.

He was also on the board of Kauno Energija AB, vice president for the Lithuanian Confederation of Industrialists, and member of the Kaunas City Council.

He was a potential candidate for 2019 Lithuanian presidential election.

His wife was Irena Matijošaitienė, who died after falling down the stairs at night.

== Controversies ==
Companies owned by Matijosaitis were found exporting banned military components to Russia, potentially assisting Russian invasion of Ukraine.
