= Rimantas Dagys =

Lithuanian chemist and politician

Rimantas Jonas Dagys
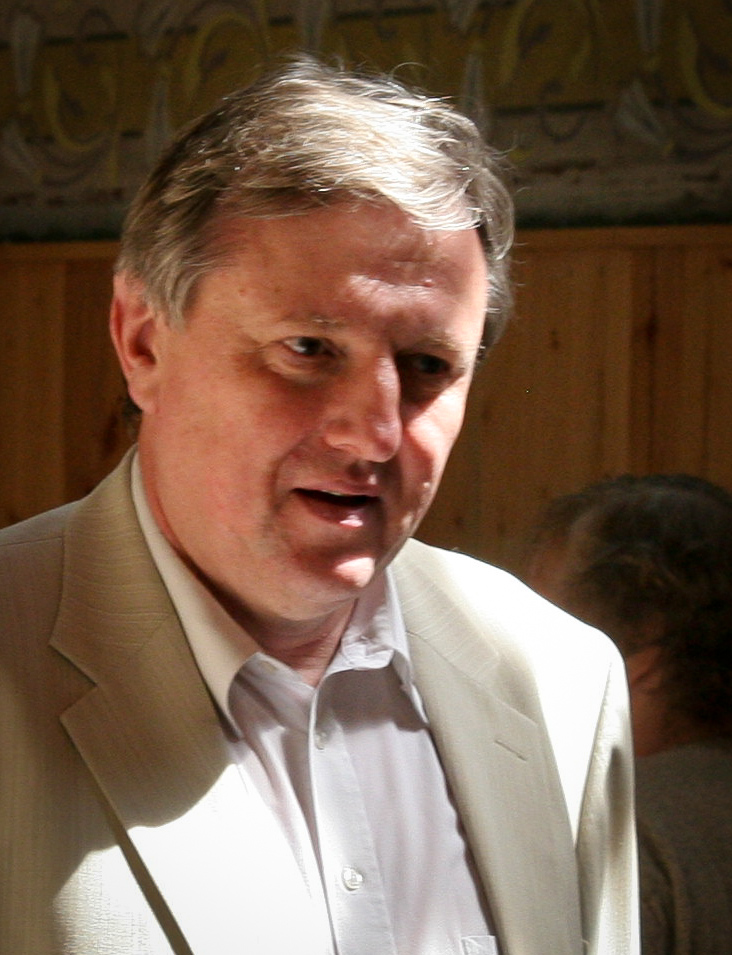

Member of the Seimas
- In office 15 November 1992 – 13 November 2020

Minister of Social Security and Labour
- In office 9 December 2008 – 22 July 2009
- Prime Minister: Andrius Kubilius
- Preceded by: Vilija Blinkevičiūtė
- Succeeded by: Donatas Jankauskas

Personal details
- Born: 16 June 1957 (age 69) Sherubay-Noora, Kazakh SSR, Soviet Union (now Abay, Kazakhstan)
- Party: Christian Union (from 2020)
- Other political affiliations: LSDP (1989–1999); LSDS (1999–2001); Homeland Union (2002–2019)
- Education: Vilnius University
- Profession: Chemist

Rimantas Jonas Dagys (born 16 July 1957) is a Lithuanian politician, member of the Seimas (1992–1996, 1996–2000), and from 2008 to 2009 assigned Minister of Labor and Social Security by presidential decree.

Rimantas Dagys was born in the settlement of Sherubay-Noora (now Abay, Kazakhstan) to a family of former Gulag prisoners, deported from Lithuania for 10 years: his mother, Filomena Dagienė was imprisoned in Vorkuta camps, his father, Jonas Dagys, in Siblag camps. The family returned to Lithuania in 1964.

On 26 June 2019 he announced about suspending his membership in Homeland Union – Lithuanian Christian Democrats, on the same day his membership was suspended by Discipline Committee of Homeland Union. Discipline Committee has explained that this decision was made, since Rimantas Dagys has not removed his signature supporting the amendments of Child protection law (thus acting together with Mindaugas Puidokas), has raised doubts about the correspondence of values of party's candidate in 2019 Lithuanian presidential election, Ingrida Šimonytė, to Christian democracy, has claimed that the amendments of Social enterprise law were proposed by party members Justas Džiugelis and Monika Navickienė. R. Dagys claimed that the conflict has started because Homeland Union, as many other parties, rejected a clear ideology, which, in his opinion is the fault of chairman Gabrielius Landsbergis, who, in his opinion, holds liberal views.

Afterwards Rimantas Dagys established a party called Christian Union. Its constituent congress happened on 8 February 2020.

Seimas
Preceded by Vytautas Šustauskas	Member of the Seimas for Šilainiai; 2004 – 2016	Succeeded by Ramūnas Karbauskis
