= Šilai Eldership =

Šilai Eldership Šilų seniūnija
- Eldership
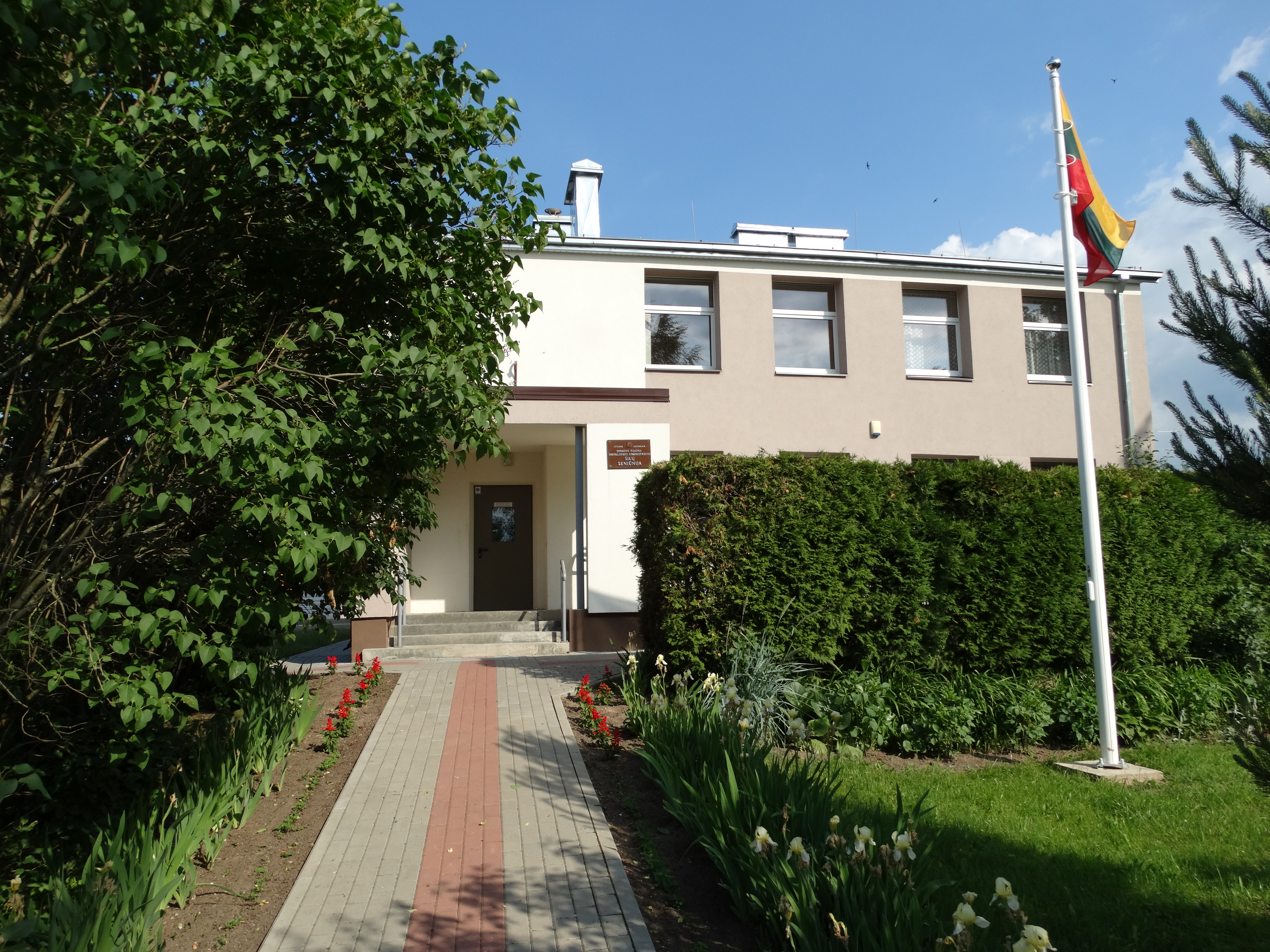
- Šilai Eldership office

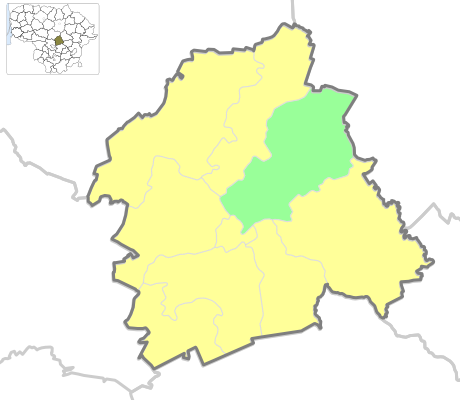
- Location of Šilai eldership
- Coordinates: 55°09′19″N 24°22′48″E
- Country: Lithuania
- Ethnographic region: Aukštaitija
- County: Kaunas County
- Municipality: Jonava District Municipality
- Administrative centre: Šilai

Area
  - Total: 143 km^{2} (55 sq mi)

Population (2021)
  - Total: 1,670
  - Density: 11.7/km^{2} (30.2/sq mi)
- Time zone: UTC+2 (EET)
  - Summer (DST): UTC+3 (EEST)

Šilai Eldership (Lithuanian: Šilų seniūnija) is a Lithuanian eldership, located in an eastern part of Jonava District Municipality. As of 2020, administrative centre and largest settlement within eldership was Šilai.

== Geography ==
- Rivers: Lokys;

== Populated places ==
Following settlements are located in the Šilai Eldership (as for 2011 census):

- Towns: Panoteriai
- Villages: Aklasis Ežeras, Balėnai, Bareišiai, Bazilioniai, Bogušiai, Butkūnai, Gedgaudai, Gegutė, Gudoniai, Gudžioniai, Ilgabradai, Jadvygava, Jasudai, Jaugeliškiai, Kaušanka, Konceptas, Konciapolis, Kulšiškiai, Laukagaliai, Liepos, Linksmavietė, Lokėnėliai, Lokys, Lukšiai, Makaronka, Mankūnai, Markutiškiai, Milagainiai, Mogeniai, Paberžė, Pagečiai, Palokis I, Palokis II, Pasiekai, Pasoda, Piliakalniai, Prauliai, Pupkuliai, Pūstelninkai, Satkūnai, Stašiūnai, Stoškai, Šemetiškiai, Šiaudinė, Šilai, Tabala, Tarakėliai, Taukadažiai, Užmiškiai, Vainiai, Varpėnai, Vatėnaia

== Demography ==
Historical population

Year	Pop.	±% p.a.
2001	2,026	—
2011	1,818	−1.08%

Year	Pop.	±% p.a.
2021	1,670	−0.85%

Source: 1902, 1923, 1959 & 1970, 1979, 1989, 2001, 20112021

== Elections ==
=== 2023 municipality elections ===
Political party	Municipality elections	
Political party	Votes	%
Social Democratic Party of Lithuania	243	53.5%
Lithuanian Farmers and Greens Union	45	9.9%
Homeland Union	35	7.7%
Liberals' Movement	33	7.3%
Lithuanian Regions Party	25	5.5%
Political committee Our Jonava	24	5.3%
Labour Party	22	4.9%
Union of Democrats "For Lithuania"	10	2.2%
Freedom Party (Lithuania)	8	1.8%
Total registered voters: 1,119		Turnout: 40.57%
