= Bukonys Eldership =

Bukonys Eldership Bukonių seniūnija
- Eldership
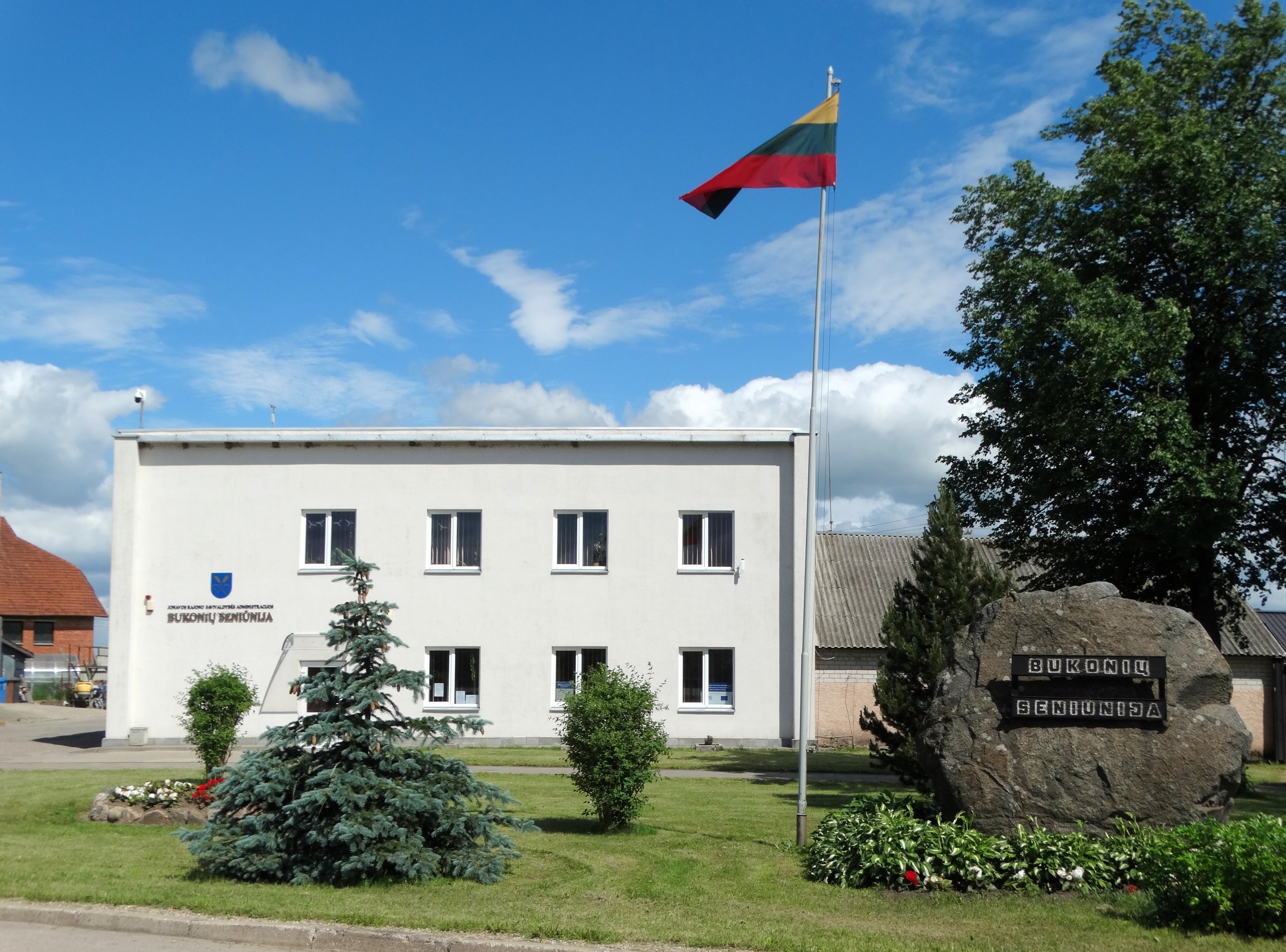
- Bukonys Eldership office

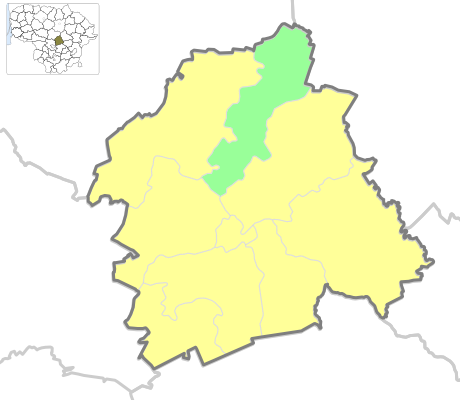
- Location of Bukonys eldership
- Coordinates: 55°12′28″N 24°19′08″E
- Country: Lithuania
- Ethnographic region: Aukštaitija
- County: Kaunas County
- Municipality: Jonava District Municipality
- Administrative centre: Bukonys

Area
  - Total: 108.4 km^{2} (41.9 sq mi)

Population (2021)
  - Total: 1,194
  - Density: 11.01/km^{2} (28.53/sq mi)
- Time zone: UTC+2 (EET)
  - Summer (DST): UTC+3 (EEST)

Bukonys Eldership (Lithuanian: Bukonių seniūnija) is a Lithuanian eldership, located in a north eastern part of Jonava District Municipality. As of 2020, administrative centre and largest settlement within eldership was Bukonys.

== Geography ==
- Rivers: Lankesa, Srautas;
- Lakes and ponds: Mimainiai lake, Biržuliai lake, Žeimelis lake;
- Forests: Siesikai forest;

== Populated places ==
Following settlements are located in the Bukonys Eldership (as for 2011 census):

- Villages: Baravykai, Biržuliai, Bukonys, Dovydonys, Dukuvka, Gaižūnai, Garniškiai, Gečiai, Juodžiai, Kačėnai, Karaliūnai, Kaupinai, Knipai, Liepiai, Liutkūnai, Mačioniai, Madlinava, Mimainiai, Narauninkiškiai, Pasraučiai, Petrašiūnai, Ražuotinė, Rudėnai, Rukuižiai, Šapova, Šiliūnai, Širviai, Vaiškoniai, Vaivadiškiai, Žeimeliai, Žvėrynas

== Demography ==
Historical population

Year	Pop.	±% p.a.
2001	1,769	—
2011	1,565	−1.22%

Year	Pop.	±% p.a.
2021	1,194	−2.67%

Source: 1902, 1923, 1959 & 1970, 1979, 1989, 2001, 20112021

== Elections ==
=== 2023 municipality elections ===
Political party	Municipality elections	
Political party	Votes	%
Social Democratic Party of Lithuania	235	58.31%
Lithuanian Farmers and Greens Union	61	15.14%
Labour Party	30	7.44%
Political committee Our Jonava	19	4.71%
Liberals' Movement	18	4.47%
Homeland Union	15	3.72%
Union of Democrats "For Lithuania"	13	3.23%
Lithuanian Regions Party	8	1.99%
Freedom Party (Lithuania)	4	0.99%
Total registered voters: 1,084		Turnout: 37.18%
