= Lokys (village) =

- Village
- Location within Lithuania
- Coordinates: 55°7′18″N 24°18′32″E
- Country: Lithuania
- County: Kaunas County
- Municipality: Jonava

Population (2001)
  - Total: 0
- Time zone: UTC+2 (EET)
  - Summer (DST): UTC+3 (EEST)

Lokys is an abandoned (according to the 2001 Lithuania census.) village in Šilai eldership, Jonava district municipality, several kilometers north-east of Jonava, by the Lokys River.
