= Upninkai Eldership =

Upninkai Eldership Upninkų seniūnija
- Eldership
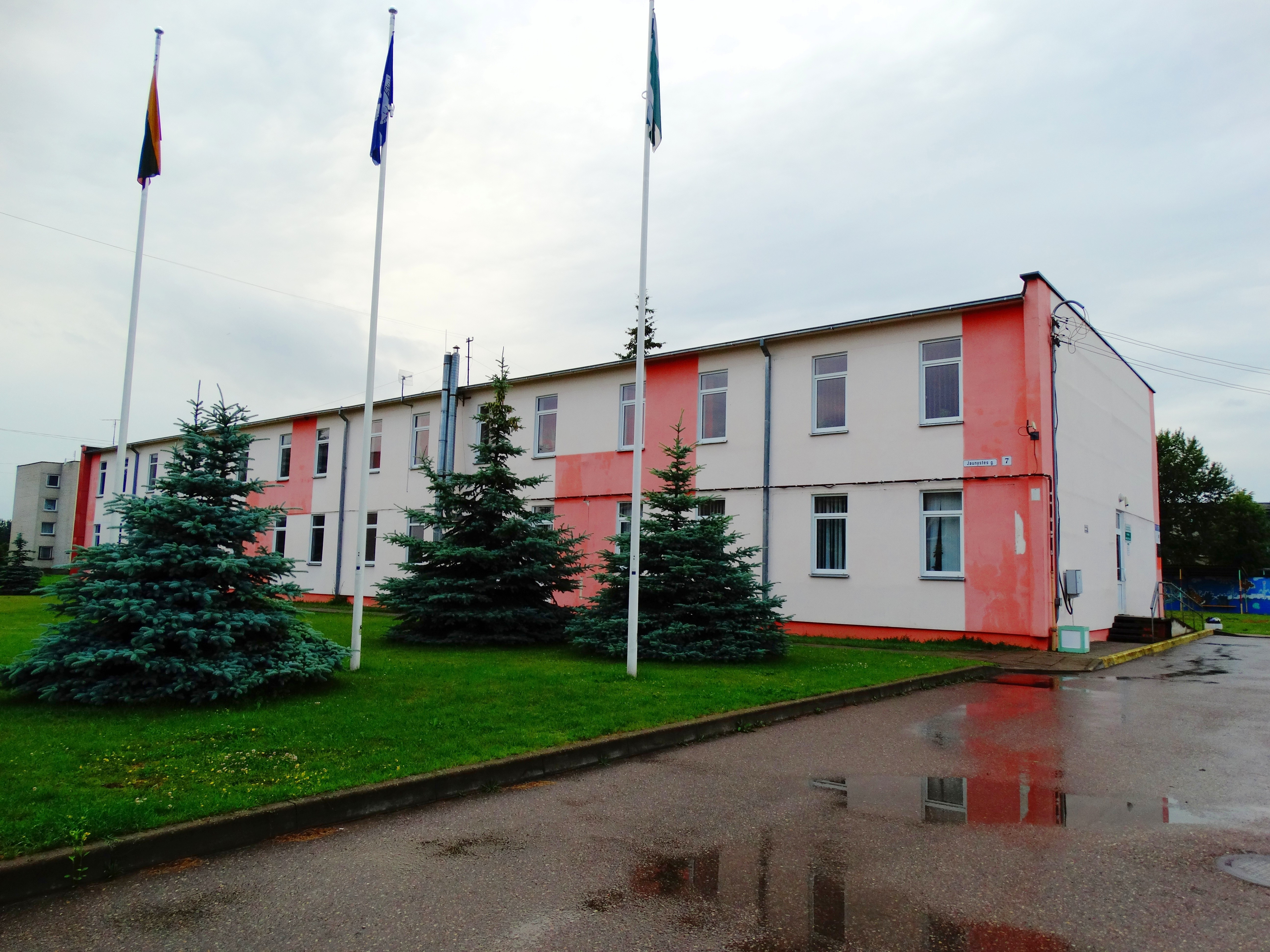
- Upninkai Eldership office

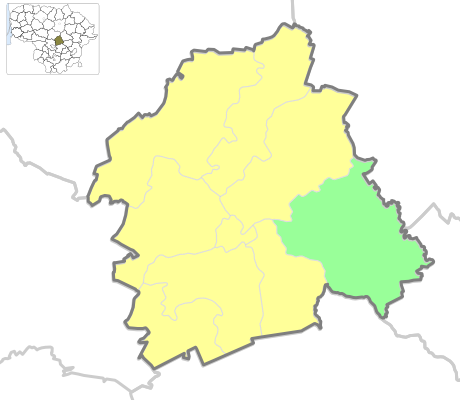
- Location of Upninkai eldership
- Coordinates: 55°05′N 24°30′E
- Country: Lithuania
- Ethnographic region: Aukštaitija
- County: Kaunas County
- Municipality: Jonava District Municipality
- Administrative centre: Upninkai

Area
  - Total: 173.41 km^{2} (66.95 sq mi)

Population (2021)
  - Total: 1,076
  - Density: 6.205/km^{2} (16.07/sq mi)
- Time zone: UTC+2 (EET)
  - Summer (DST): UTC+3 (EEST)

Upninkai Eldership (Lithuanian: Upninkų seniūnija) is a Lithuanian eldership, located in an eastern part of Jonava District Municipality. As of 2020, administrative centre and largest settlement within eldership was Upninkai.

== Geography ==
- Rivers: Širvinta;

== Populated places ==
Following settlements are located in the Upninkai Eldership (as for 2011 census):

- Villages: Alekniškis, Apeikiškiai, Arnotiškiai, Aukštakaimis, Ąžuolynė, Bajoriškiai, Baltromiškė, Būda, Dienovidžiai, Dubiai, Eglinė, Galijevka, Gegutės, Gegužinė, Jakimauka, Jurkonys, Karčiai, Karčiškiai, Karveliškiai, Keižonys, Kernaviškiai, Kryžiauka, Kunigiškiai, Kūniškiai, Liudvikiškiai, Liukonėliai, Makštava, Mančiušėnai, Mantromiškiai, Medinai, Padaigai, Pageležiai, Pakalniškis, Perelozai, Rizgonys, Saleninkai, Santaka, Sergiejevka, Šakiai, Šilėnai, Upninkai, Upninkėliai, Užupės, Vanagiškis, Vareikiai, Vyšnialaukis

== Demography ==
Historical population

Year	Pop.	±% p.a.
2001	1,698	—
2011	1,328	−2.43%

Year	Pop.	±% p.a.
2021	1,076	−2.08%

Source: 1902, 1923, 1959 & 1970, 1979, 1989, 2001, 20112021

== Elections ==
=== 2023 municipality elections ===
Political party	Municipality elections	
Political party	Votes	%
Social Democratic Party of Lithuania	177	58.4%
Lithuanian Farmers and Greens Union	38	12.5%
Homeland Union	25	8.3%
Lithuanian Regions Party	16	5.3%
Labour Party	12	4.0%
Political committee Our Jonava	11	3.6%
Freedom Party (Lithuania)	6	2.0%
Union of Democrats "For Lithuania"	4	1.3%
Liberals' Movement	2	0.7%
Total registered voters: 953		Turnout: 31.86%
