= Užusaliai Eldership =

Užusaliai Eldership Užusalių seniūnija
- Eldership
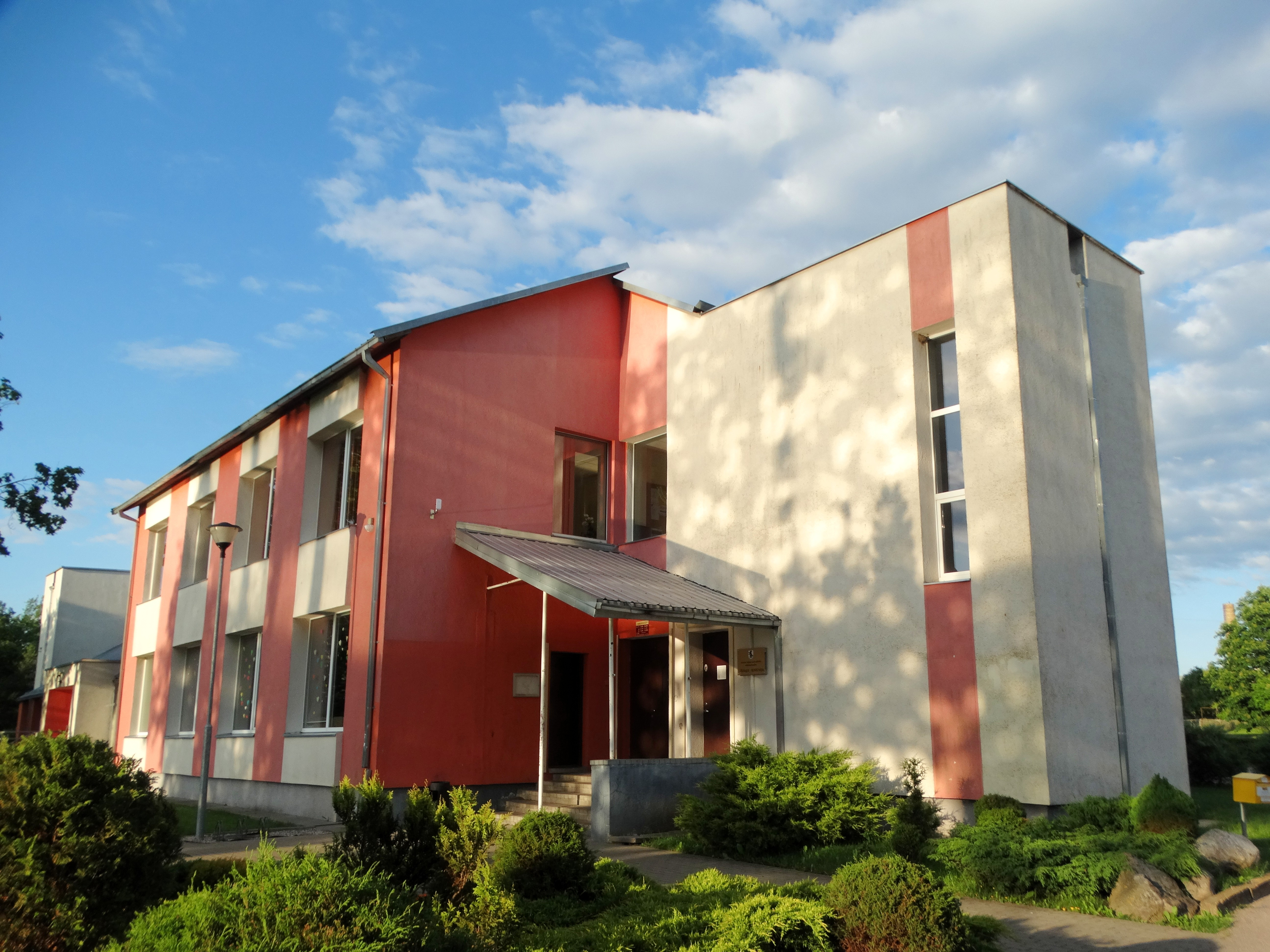
- Užusaliai Eldership office

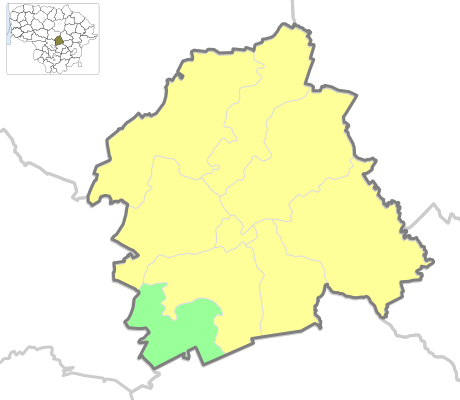
- Location of Užusaliai eldership
- Coordinates: 54°59′N 24°10′E
- Country: Lithuania
- Ethnographic region: Aukštaitija
- County: Kaunas County
- Municipality: Jonava District Municipality
- Administrative centre: Užusaliai

Area
  - Total: 81.03 km^{2} (31.29 sq mi)

Population (2021)
  - Total: 2,198
  - Density: 27.13/km^{2} (70.26/sq mi)
- Time zone: UTC+2 (EET)
  - Summer (DST): UTC+3 (EEST)

Užusaliai Eldership (Lithuanian: Užusalių seniūnija) is a Lithuanian eldership, located in a western part of Jonava District Municipality. As of 2020, administrative centre and largest settlement within eldership was Užusaliai.

== Populated places ==
Following settlements are located in the Užusaliai Eldership (as for 2011 census):

- Villages: Būdos II, Būdos III, Būdos IV, Būdos V, Daukliūnai, Didysis Raistas, Gireliai, Girininkai II, Guldynai, Išorai, Kalnėnai, Krėslynai, Kungušilai, Mikainiai, Naujatriobiai, Pabiržis, Pagojis, Paskutiškiai, Pašiliai, Sunkiniai, Svilonėliai, Sviloniai, Šafarka, Šešuva, Turžėnai, Užusaliai, Veseluvka

== Demography ==
Historical population

Year	Pop.	±% p.a.
2001	2,378	—
2011	2,326	−0.22%

Year	Pop.	±% p.a.
2021	2,198	−0.56%

Source: 1902, 1923, 1959 & 1970, 1979, 1989, 2001, 20112021

== Elections ==
=== 2023 municipality elections ===
Political party	Municipality elections	
Political party	Votes	%
Social Democratic Party of Lithuania	393	54.3%
Lithuanian Farmers and Greens Union	74	10.2%
Homeland Union	56	7.7%
Lithuanian Regions Party	53	7.3%
Labour Party	45	6.2%
Political committee Our Jonava	28	3.9%
Liberals' Movement	22	3.0%
Union of Democrats "For Lithuania"	21	2.9%
Freedom Party (Lithuania)	16	2.2%
Total registered voters: 2,050		Turnout: 35.32%
