= Victor Gallois =

Composer (1880–1941)

Victor-Léon Gallois (1880–1941) was a French conductor, composer and teacher.

== Life ==
Gallois was born in Douai, to Alexandre Gallois, a 32-year-old paper merchant, and Sophie Vanville. When he was nine, his father died, and he was taken in charge and educated by a catholic foundation, l'Ecole des Frères (Institution Saint-Jean).

He entered the Paris Conservatoire in 1896, and worked as an accompanist in various cafés-concerts to earn his living while there. He was considered a gifted pupil of Louis Diémer; he focused on composition. In 1905, he won the Premier grand Prix de Rome, in competition with Maurice Ravel, who was competing for the fifth time but was eliminated in the first round. Through the subsequent outrage, according to one source, Gallois' composing career in Paris was cut short and he returned to northern France. Nevertheless, Gallois spent a productive four years at the Villa Medici, composing chamber, choral and orchestral works from 1906 to 1909. He received further awards (the Prix Pinette and the Prix Beulé, for his compositions in Rome) in the years after his return from Italy. In 1914 he was musically active in northern France.

During the First World War he became a civil prisoner of the Germans between 1914 and 1917, held at Holzminden internment camp. On his release in 1917 he too up the position of head of the Douai Conservatoire in succession to Paul Cuenelaere. In 1918 was deported by the Germans to a concentration camp at Milagainiai, Lithuania, for conducting the French national anthem. After the war ended, he resumed direction of the Douai Conservatoire.

During the inter-war years he continued composing, teaching and performing- many of his pieces were premiered in northern France. On 2 August 1921 he married Marguerite Lambilliotte (26 April 1884- 4 July 1958); although childless, they remained married until his death.

Amongst Gallois' pupils were Henri Dutilleux (1916–2013), the jazz violonist Michel Warlop, conductor Georges Prêtre, and soprano Claudine Collart.

In the Second World War the Douai Conservatoire was bombed by the Luftwaffe, along with his home, in May 1940. He moved to Beaujeu, Rhône, where he died of cancer on 24 March 1941.
