= Lokėnėliai =

- Village
- Location of Lokėnėliai
- Coordinates: 55°05′49″N 24°21′11″E
- Country: Lithuania
- County: Kaunas County
- Municipality: Jonava District Municipality
- Eldership: Šilai Eldership

Population (2011)
  - Total: 14
- Time zone: UTC+2 (EET)
  - Summer (DST): UTC+3 (EEST)

Lokėnėliai is a village in Lithuania. It is located near the Jonava–Ukmergė road and the Lokys stream (tributary of the Neris). According to the 2011 census, the village had 14 residents. Lokės pėda (literally: bear's foot), an adventure park, was established in the village in 2005. The park covers 1.3 hectares (3.2 acres) and offers obstacle courses in trees and zip-lines.
