= Bazilioniai =

- Village
- Location within Lithuania
- Coordinates: 55°05′20″N 24°18′29″E
- Country: Lithuania
- County: Kaunas County
- Municipality: Jonava district municipality
- Eldership: Šilai Eldership

Population (2011)
  - Total: 42
- Time zone: UTC+2 (EET)
  - Summer (DST): UTC+3 (EEST)

Bazilioniai is a village in Jonava District Municipality, Kaunas County, in central Lithuania. According to the 2011 census, the village has a population of 42 people.
