= Mimainiai =

- Village
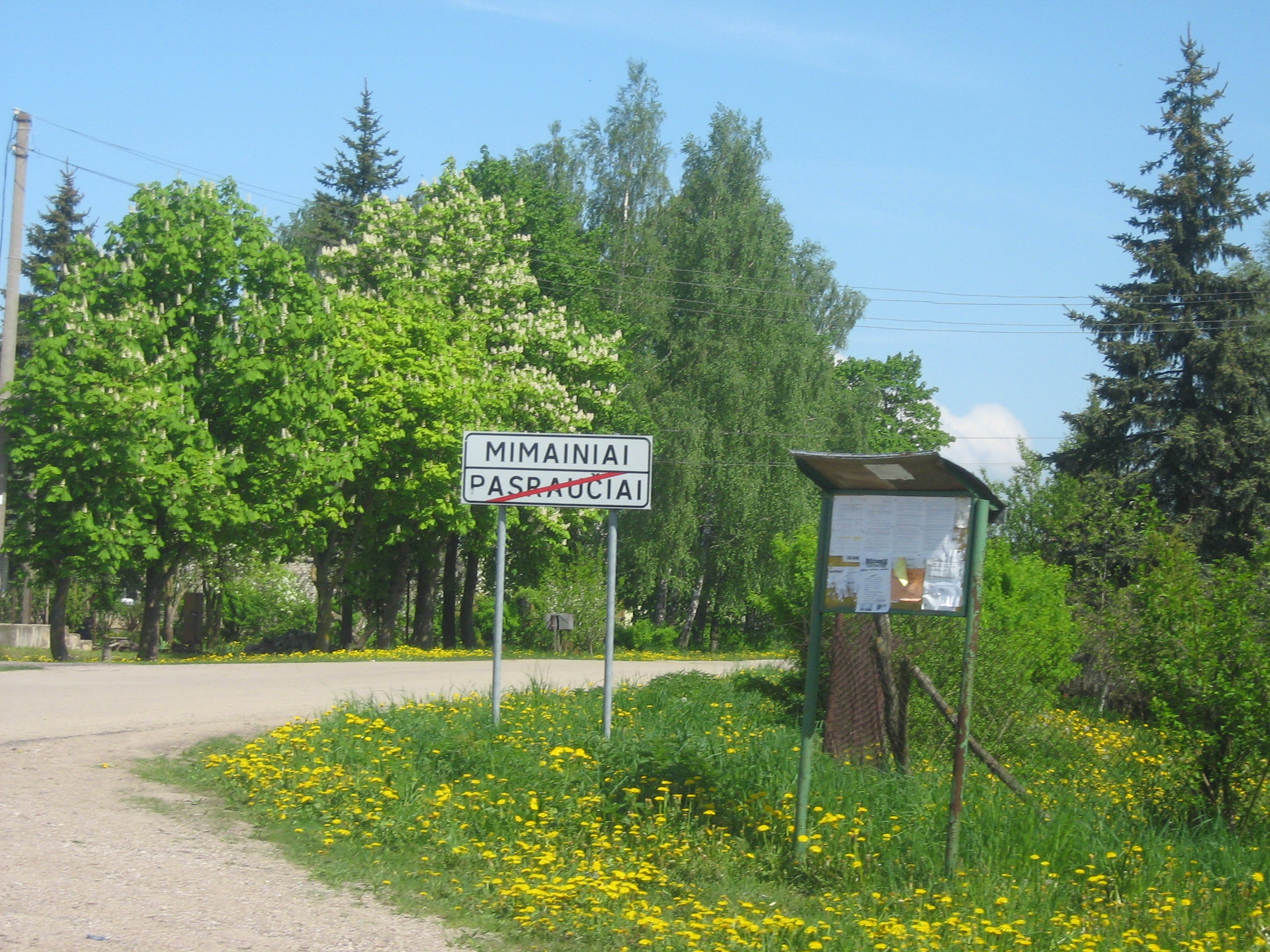

- Location within Lithuania
- Coordinates: 55°14′40″N 24°20′40″E
- Country: Lithuania
- County: Kaunas County
- Municipality: Jonava

Population (2001)
  - Total: 166
- Time zone: UTC+2 (EET)
  - Summer (DST): UTC+3 (EEST)

Mimainiai is a village in Jonava district municipality, in Kaunas County, in central Lithuania. According to the 2001 census, the village has a population of 166 people. Village established near Mimainiai Lake.
