= Baltromiškė =

- Village
- Location within Lithuania
- Coordinates: 55°6′0″N 24°25′0″E
- Country: Lithuania
- County: Kaunas County
- Municipality: Jonava

Population (2011)
  - Total: 19
- Time zone: UTC+2 (EET)
  - Summer (DST): UTC+3 (EEST)

Baltromiškė is a village in the Jonava district municipality, in Kaunas County located in central Lithuania. According to the 2011 census, the village has a population of 19 people. There is a church of Old Believers. The village is famous for gravel mines.
