= Liepiai =

- Village
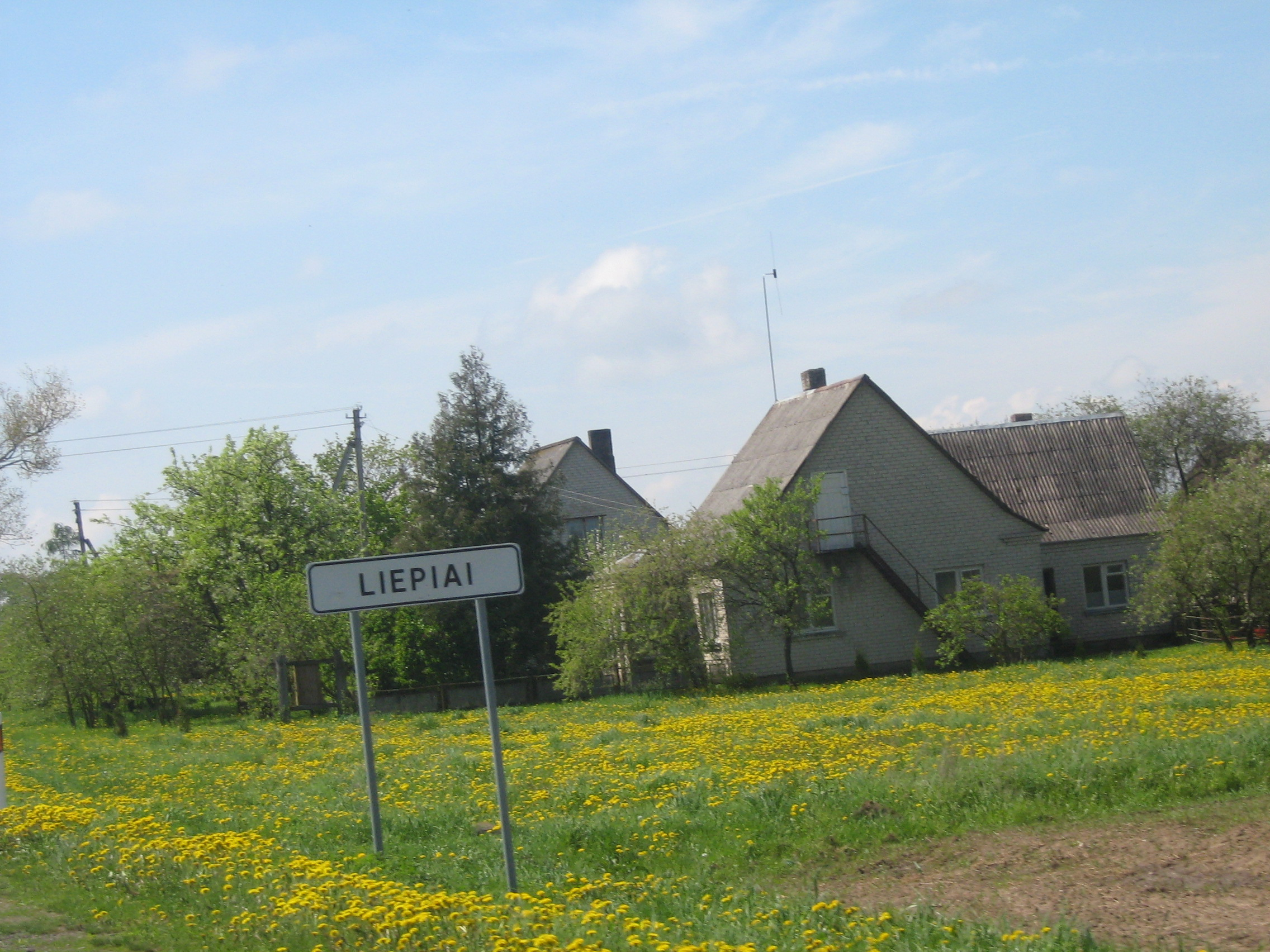

- Location in Lithuania
- Coordinates: 55°10′50″N 24°18′20″E
- Country: Lithuania
- County: Kaunas County
- Municipality: Jonava

Population (2011)
  - Total: 378
- Time zone: UTC+2 (EET)
  - Summer (DST): UTC+3 (EEST)

Liepiai is a village in Jonava district municipality, in Kaunas County, in central Lithuania. According to the 2011 census, the village has a population of 378 people.
