= Jonava City Eldership =

Jonava City Eldership Jonavos miesto seniūnija
- Eldership
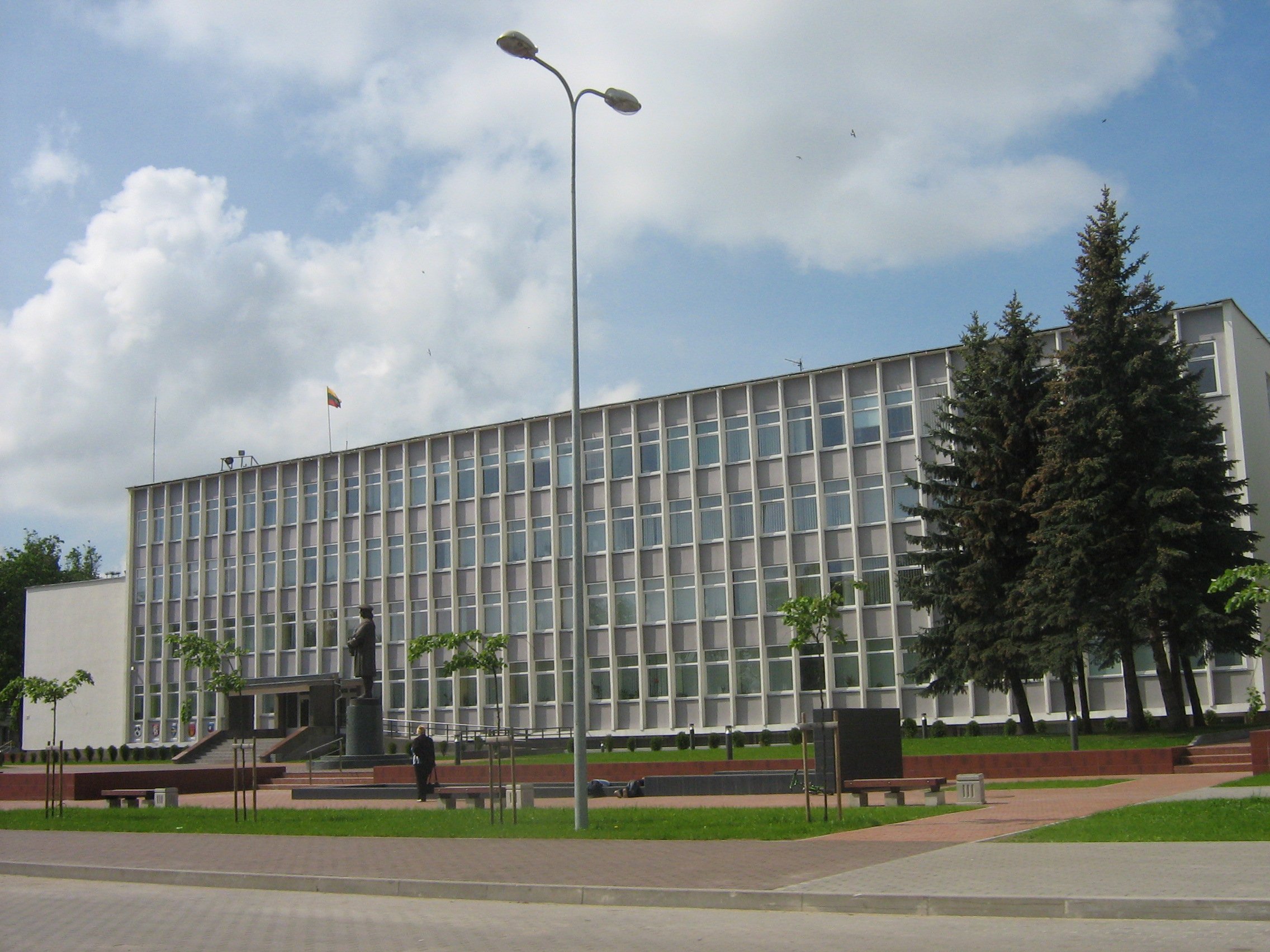
- Municipality and Eldership office

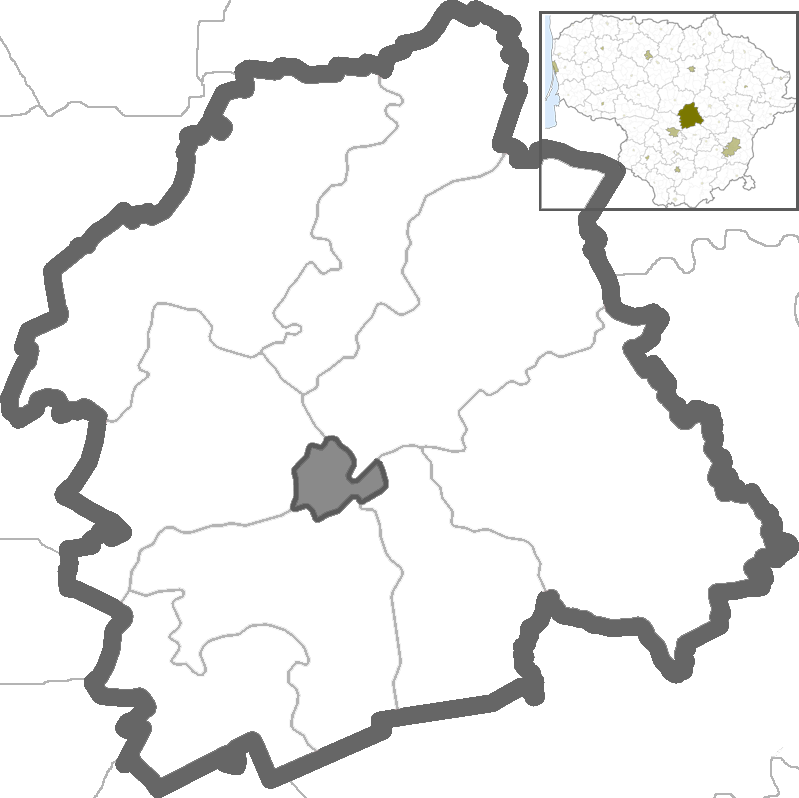
- Location of Jonava City eldership
- Coordinates: 55°04′44″N 24°17′06″E
- Country: Lithuania
- Ethnographic region: Aukštaitija
- County: Kaunas County
- Municipality: Jonava District Municipality
- Administrative centre: Jonava

Area
  - Total: 10.639 km^{2} (4.108 sq mi)

Population (2021)
  - Total: 27,381
  - Density: 2,573.6/km^{2} (6,665.7/sq mi)
- Time zone: UTC+2 (EET)
  - Summer (DST): UTC+3 (EEST)

Jonava City Eldership (Lithuanian: Jonavos miesto seniūnija) is a Lithuanian eldership, located in a central part of Jonava District Municipality.

== Geography ==
- Rivers: Neris, Taurosta, Lankis, Varnaka

== Demography ==
Historical population
Year / Pop. / ±% p.a.; 2011 / 30,650 / —	Year / Pop. / ±% p.a.; 2021 / 27,381 / −1.12%
Source: 1902, 1923, 1959 & 1970, 1979, 1989, 2001, 20112021

== Elections ==
=== 2023 municipality elections ===
Political party	Municipality elections	
Political party	Votes	%
Social Democratic Party of Lithuania	6464	62.76%
Lithuanian Farmers and Greens Union	776	7.53%
Liberals' Movement	724	7.03%
Homeland Union	612	5.94%
Political committee Our Jonava	571	5.54%
Union of Democrats "For Lithuania"	339	3.29%
Lithuanian Regions Party	330	3.20%
Labour Party	288	2.79%
Freedom Party (Lithuania)	194	1.88%
Total registered voters: 22,337		Turnout: 46.10%
