= Panoteriai =

- Town
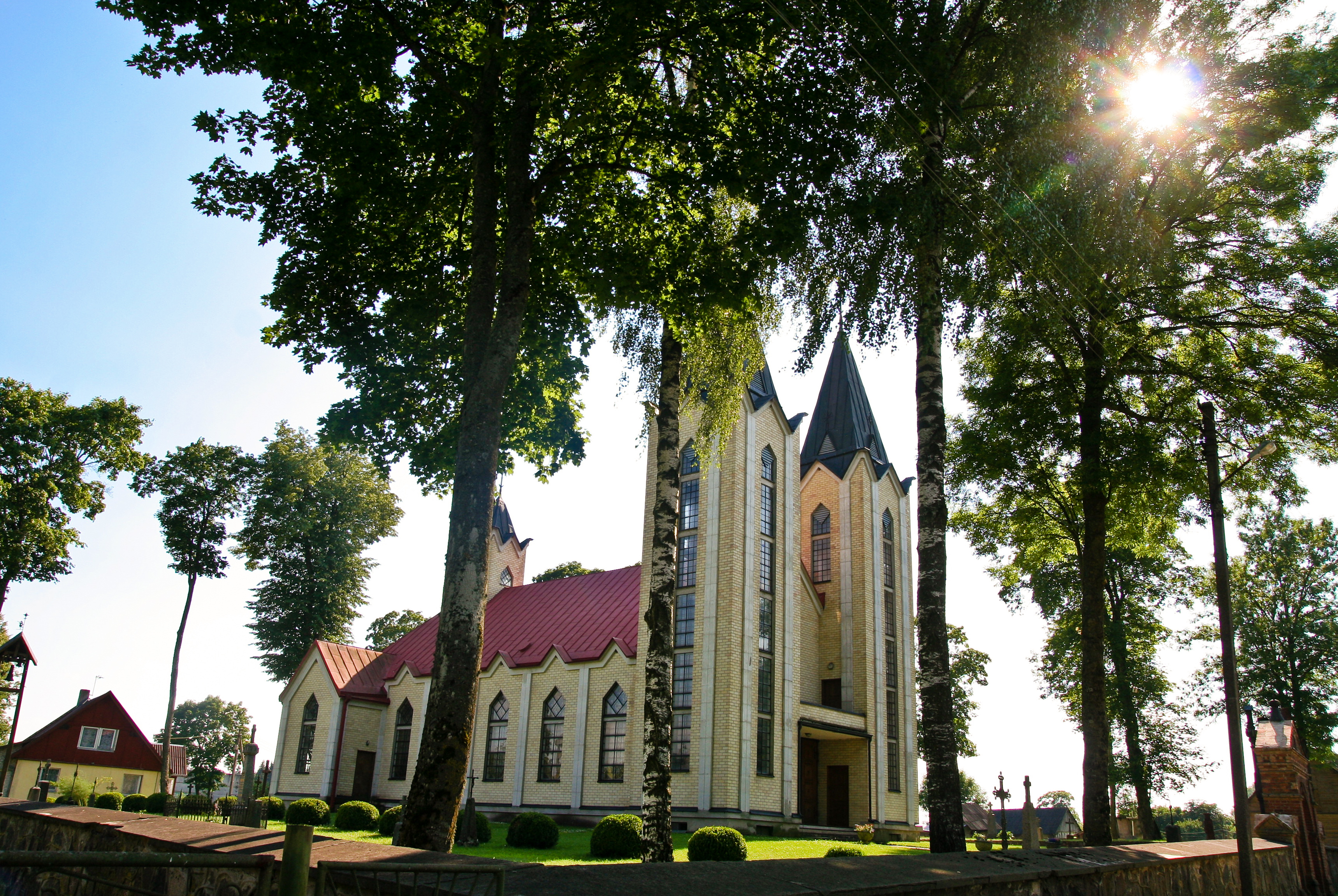
- Panoteriai church

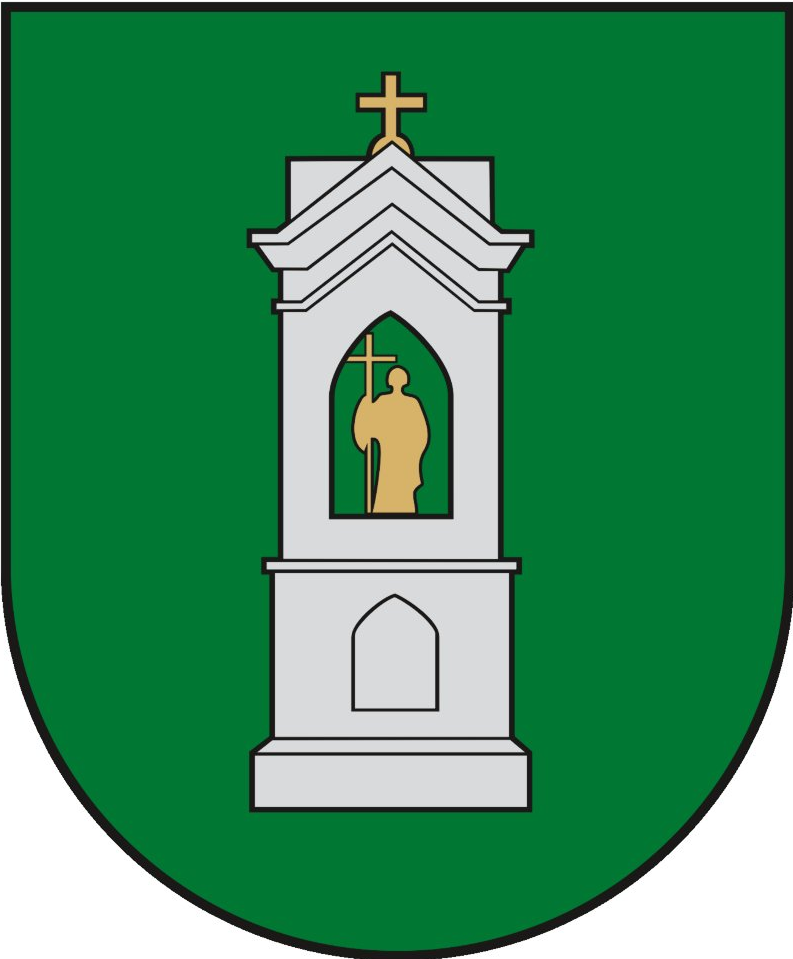
- Coat of arms

- Location in Lithuania
- Coordinates: 55°11′40″N 24°25′40″E
- Country: Lithuania
- Ethnographic region: Aukštaitija
- County: Kaunas County
- Municipality: Jonava district municipality
- Eldership: Šilai Eldership

Population (2011)
  - Total: 360
- Time zone: UTC+2 (EET)
  - Summer (DST): UTC+3 (EEST)

Panoteriai is a small town in Kaunas County in central Lithuania. As of 2011 it had a population of 360. There is a Catholic church (Church Panoteriai), a library, post office (LT-55085), as well as a cultural center.
