= Užusaliai =

- Village
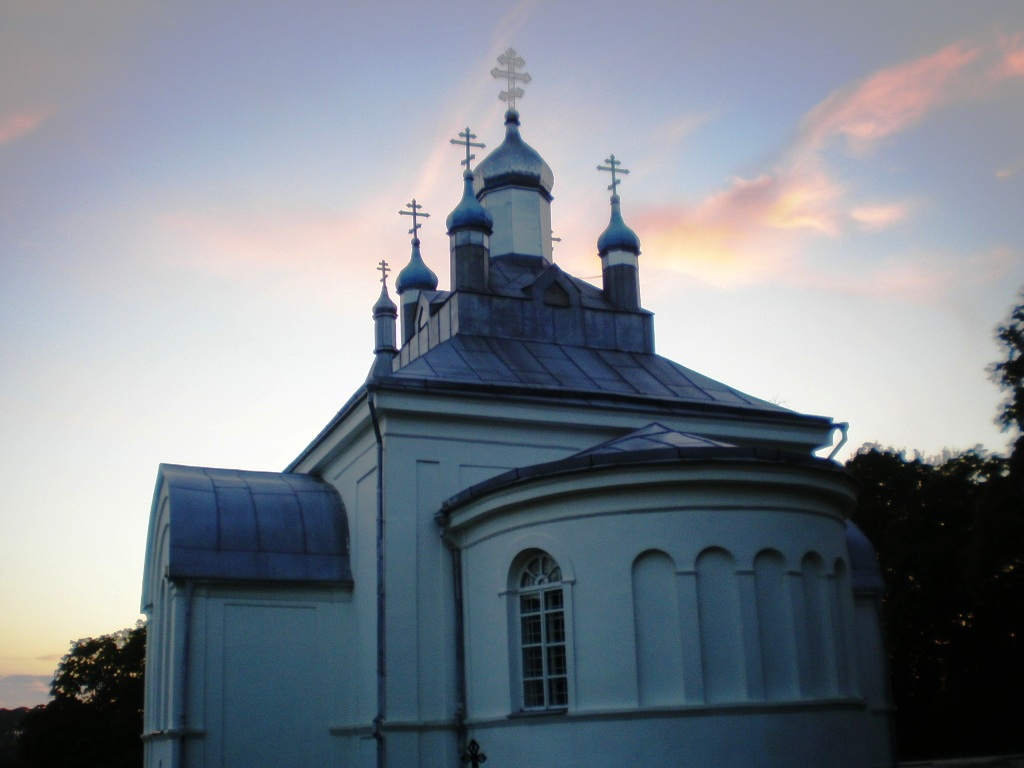

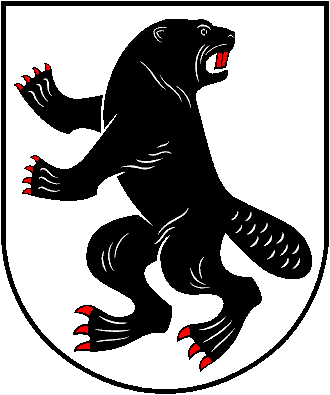
- Coat of arms

- Location within Lithuania
- Coordinates: 54°59′00″N 24°11′50″E
- Country: Lithuania
- County: Kaunas County
- Municipality: Jonava

Population (2011)
  - Total: 584
- Time zone: UTC+2 (EET)
  - Summer (DST): UTC+3 (EEST)

Užusaliai is a village in Jonava district municipality, in Kaunas County, in central Lithuania. According to the 2011 census, the village has a population of 584 people. Administrative centre of Užusaliai Eldership.

Užusaliai has a primary school, a library (works since 1940), a post office (ZIP code: 55044), a cultural centre, and a cemetery.

== Education ==
- Užusaliai primary school

== Gallery ==
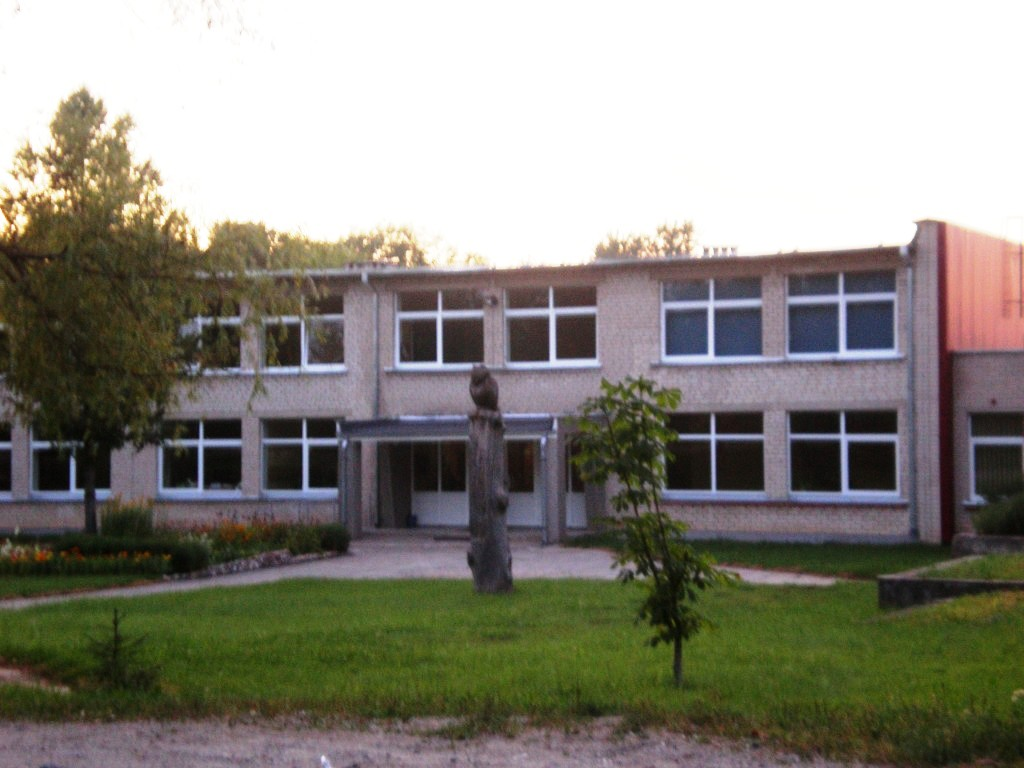
Užusalių pagrindinė mokykla

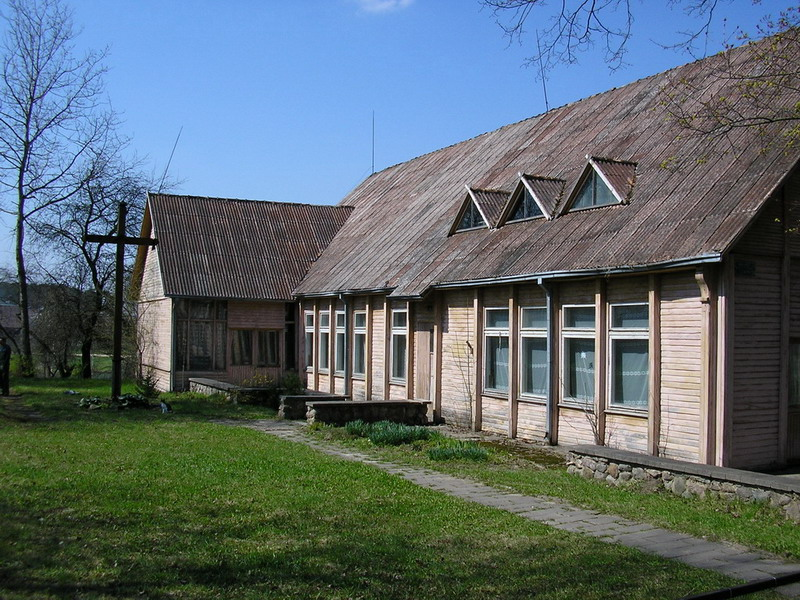
Užusaliai old school

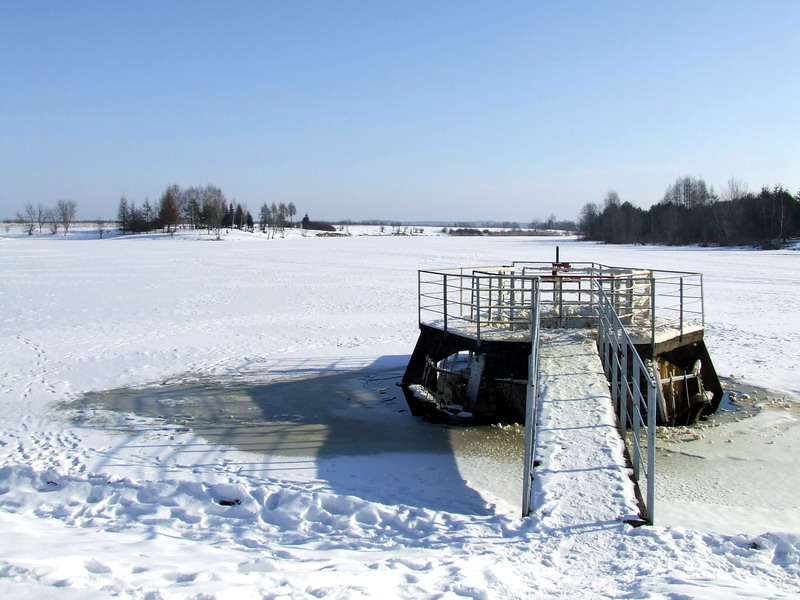
Užusaliai pond
