= Petrašiūnai, Jonava =

Petrašiūnai
- Village
- Location in Lithuania
- Coordinates: 55°12′20″N 24°19′30″E
- Country: Lithuania
- County: Kaunas County
- Municipality: Jonava district municipality
- Eldership: Bukonys eldership

Population (2011)
  - Total: 102
- Time zone: UTC+2 (EET)
  - Summer (DST): UTC+3 (EEST)

Petrašiūnai is a village in Jonava district municipality, in Kaunas County, central Lithuania. According to the 2011 census, the town has a population of 102.
