= Bukonys =

- Village
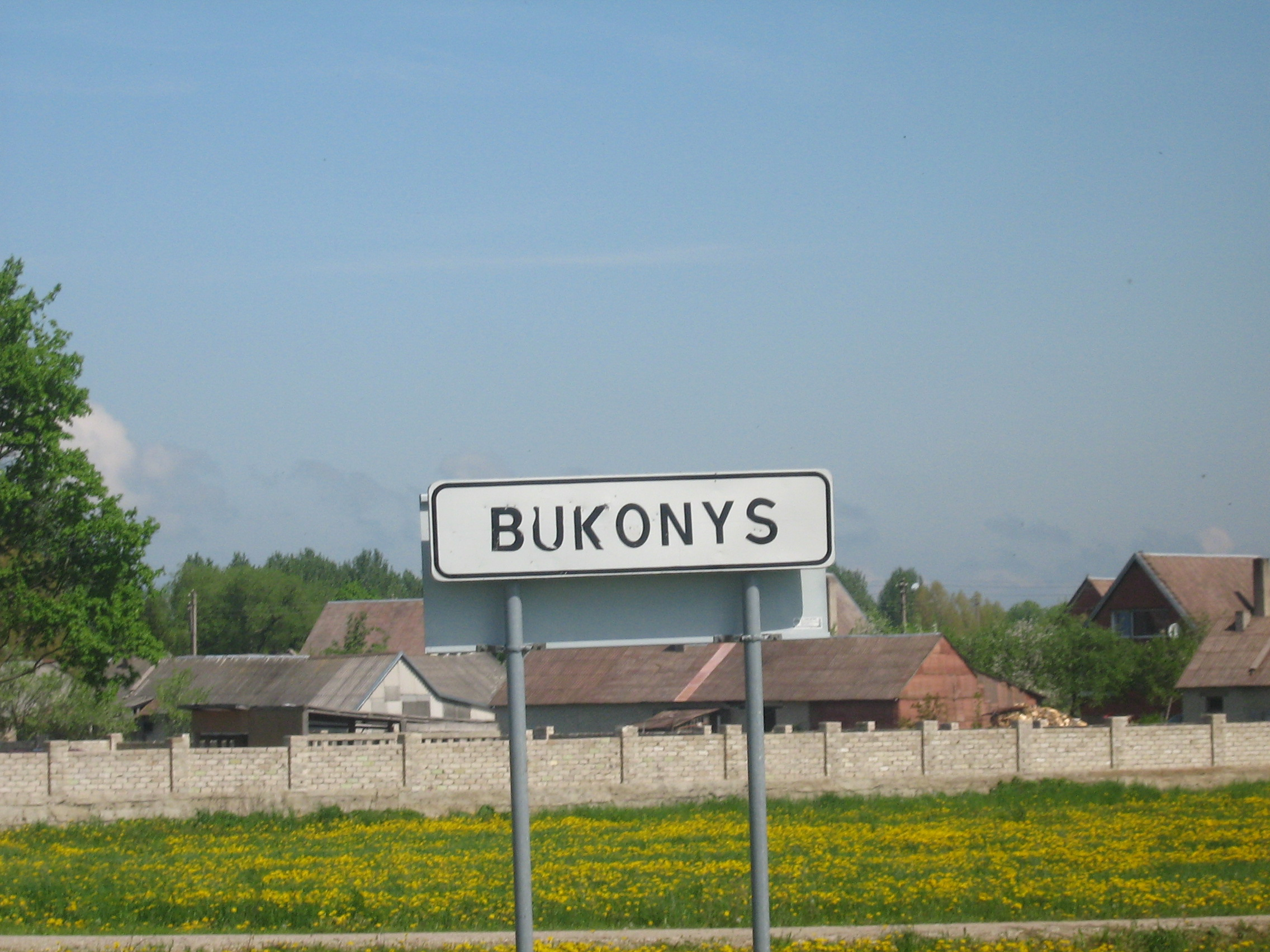

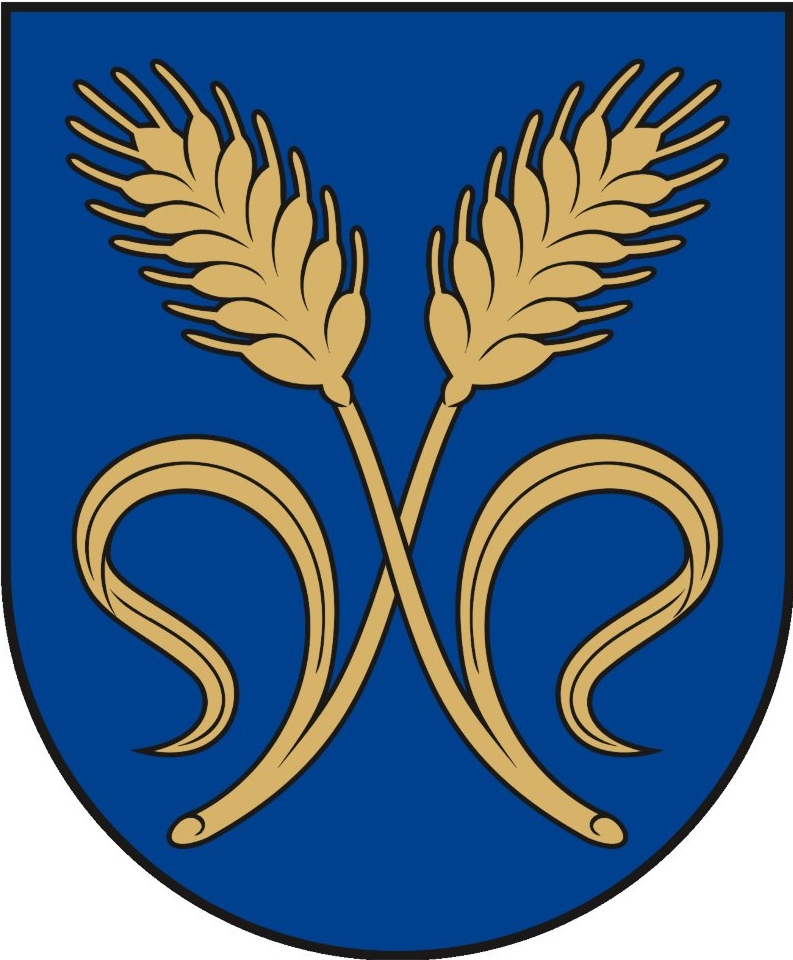
- Coat of arms

- Location within Lithuania
- Coordinates: 55°13′20″N 24°22′20″E
- Country: Lithuania
- County: Kaunas County
- Municipality: Jonava

Population (2001)
  - Total: 657
- Time zone: UTC+2 (EET)
  - Summer (DST): UTC+3 (EEST)

Bukonys is a village in Jonava district municipality, in Kaunas County, in central Lithuania. According to the 2001 census, the village has a population of 657 people.

The village has Bukonių primary school, post office (ZIP code: 55075), Bukonių church of St. archangel Mykolas (built in 1829), cemetery and residues of a manor.

== Gallery ==
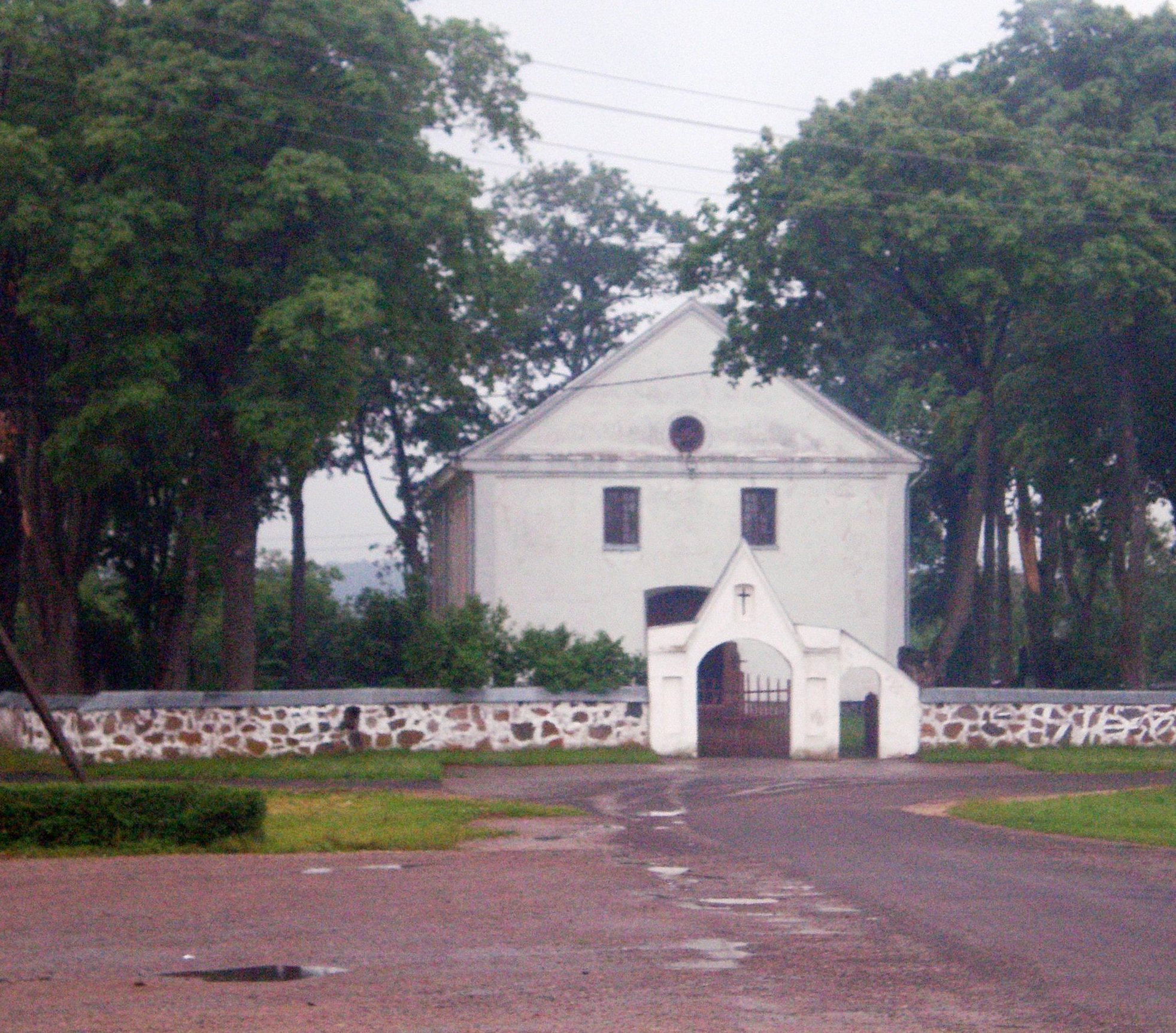
Church of Bukonys

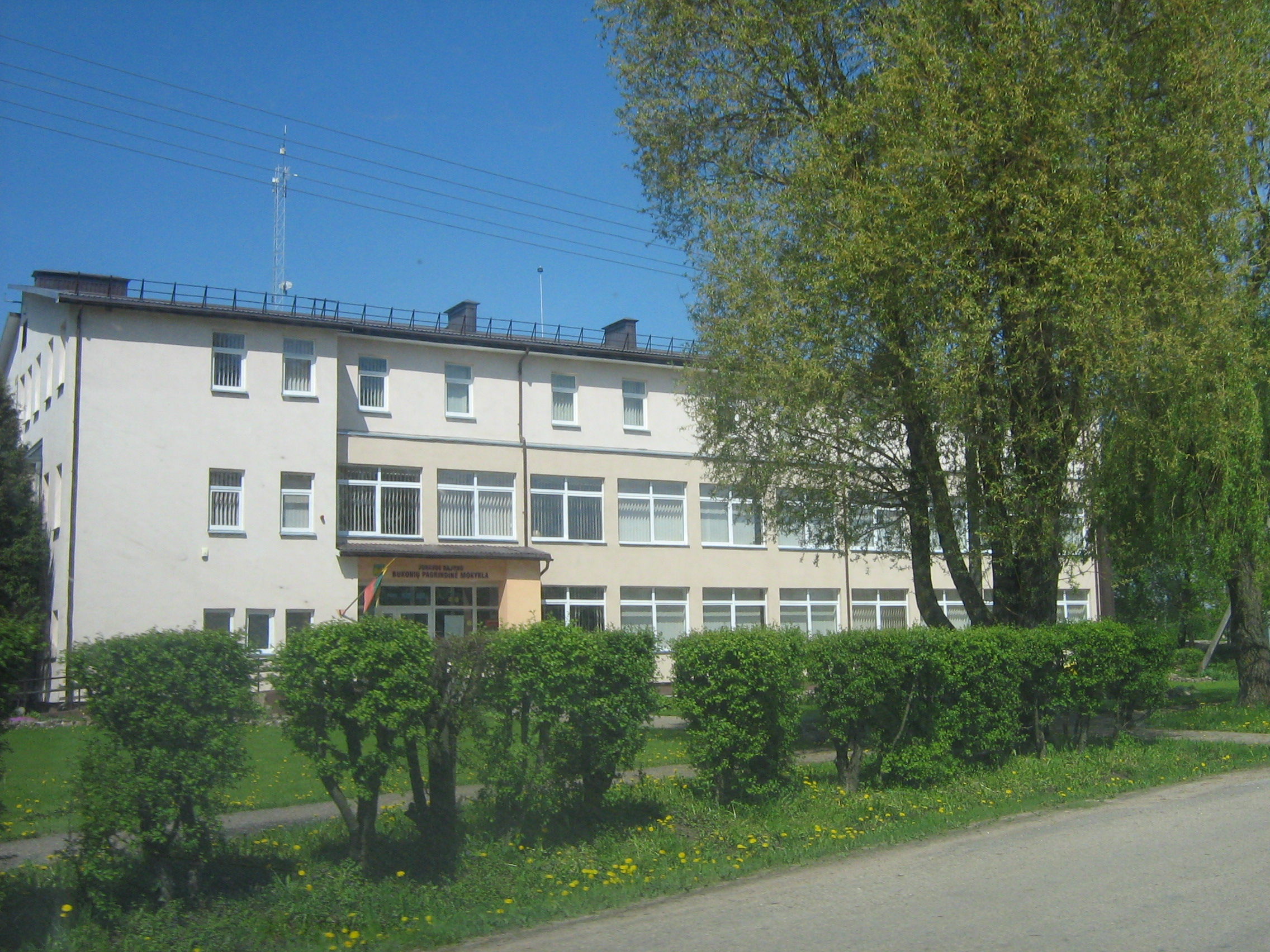
Bukonys primary school

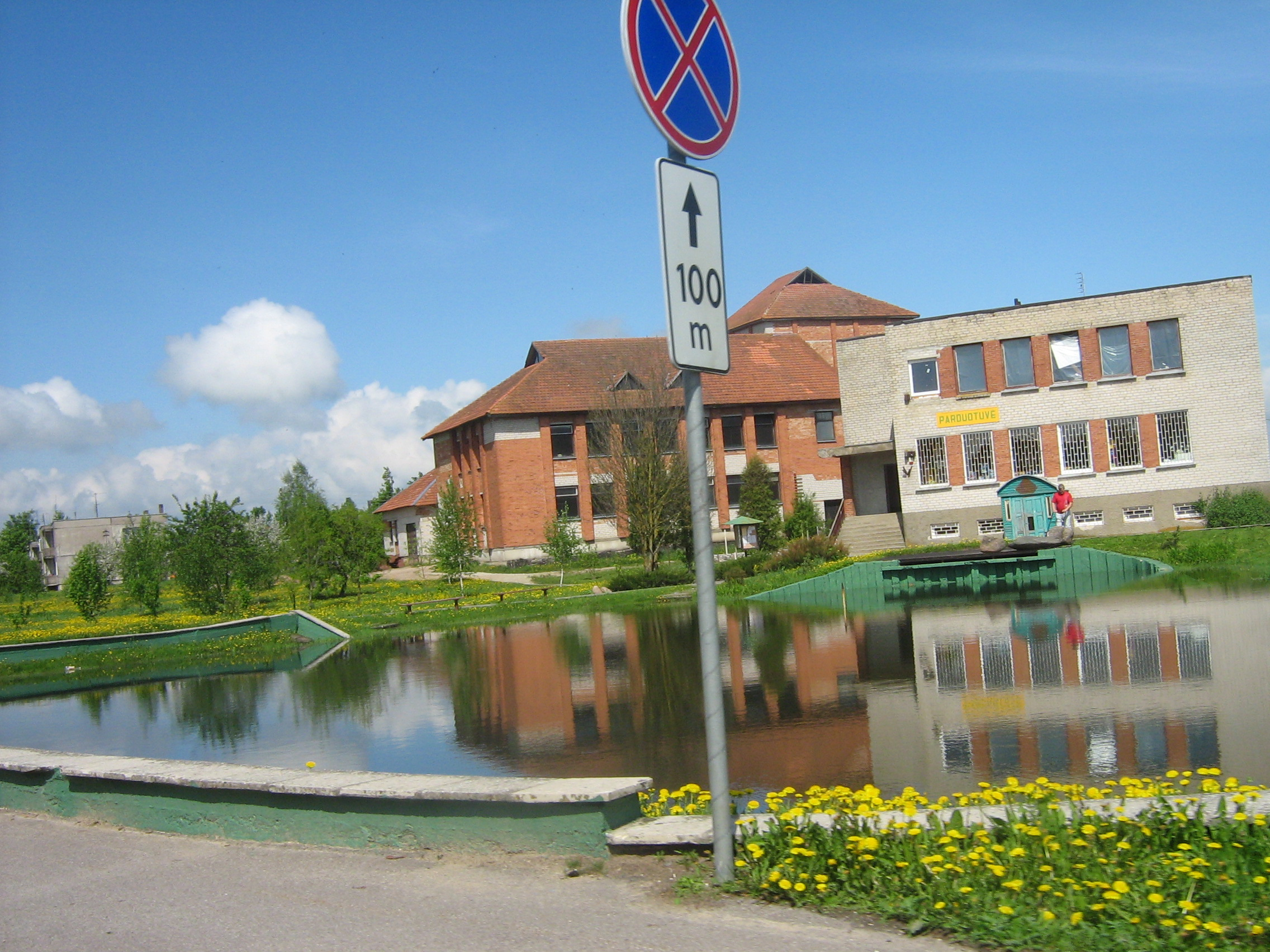
