= Šilai, Jonava =

Šilai
- Village
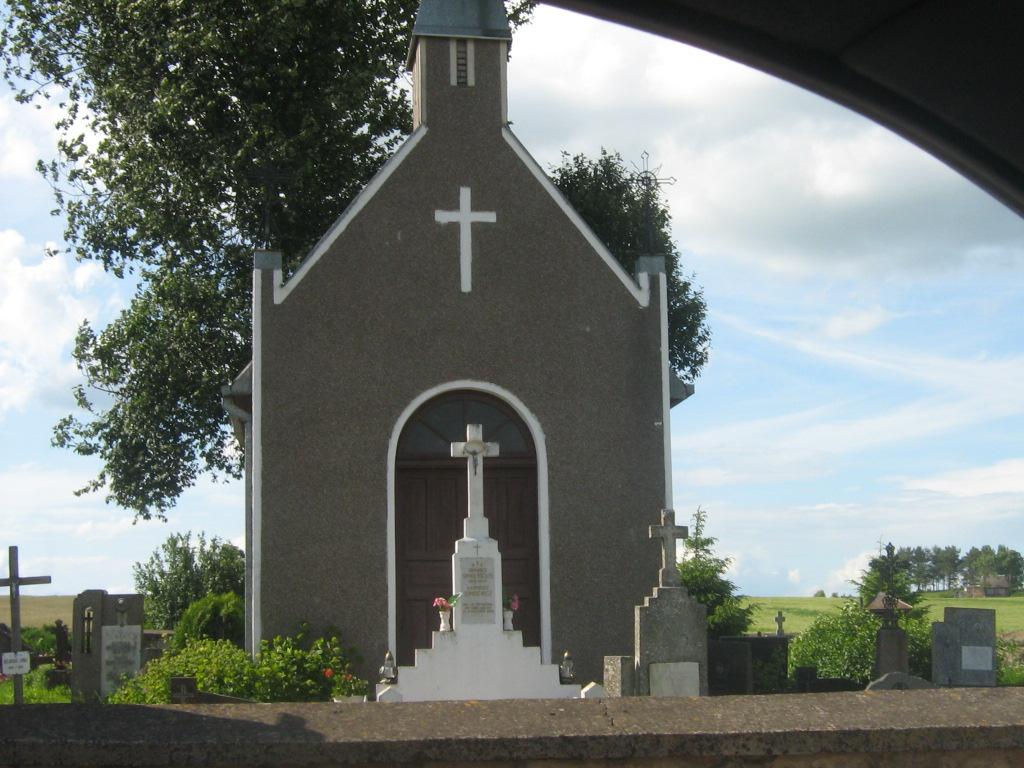

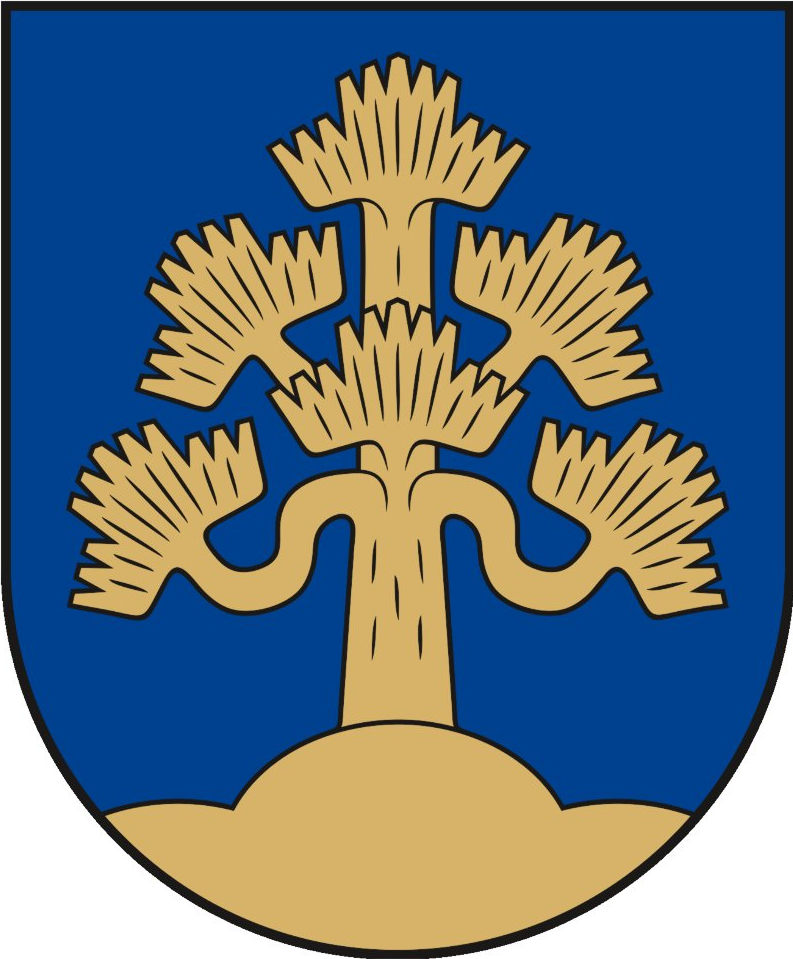
- Coat of arms

- Location of Šilai in Lithuania
- Coordinates: 55°07′20″N 24°19′50″E
- Country: Lithuania
- County: Kaunas County
- Municipality: Jonava

Population (2011)
  - Total: 347
- Time zone: UTC+2 (EET)
  - Summer (DST): UTC+3 (EEST)

Šilai is a village in Jonava district municipality, in Kaunas County, in central Lithuania. According to the 2011 Lithuania census, the village has a population of 347 people. Administrative centre of Šilai Eldership.

== Famous villagers ==
- Simonas Martynas Kosakovskis, Polish-Lithuanian nobleman (szlachcic), and one of the leaders of the Targowica Confederation.
- Juozapas Kazimieras Kosakovskis, bishop of Livonia from 1781, political activist, writer, and supporter of Russian Empire.
