= Lokys (river) =

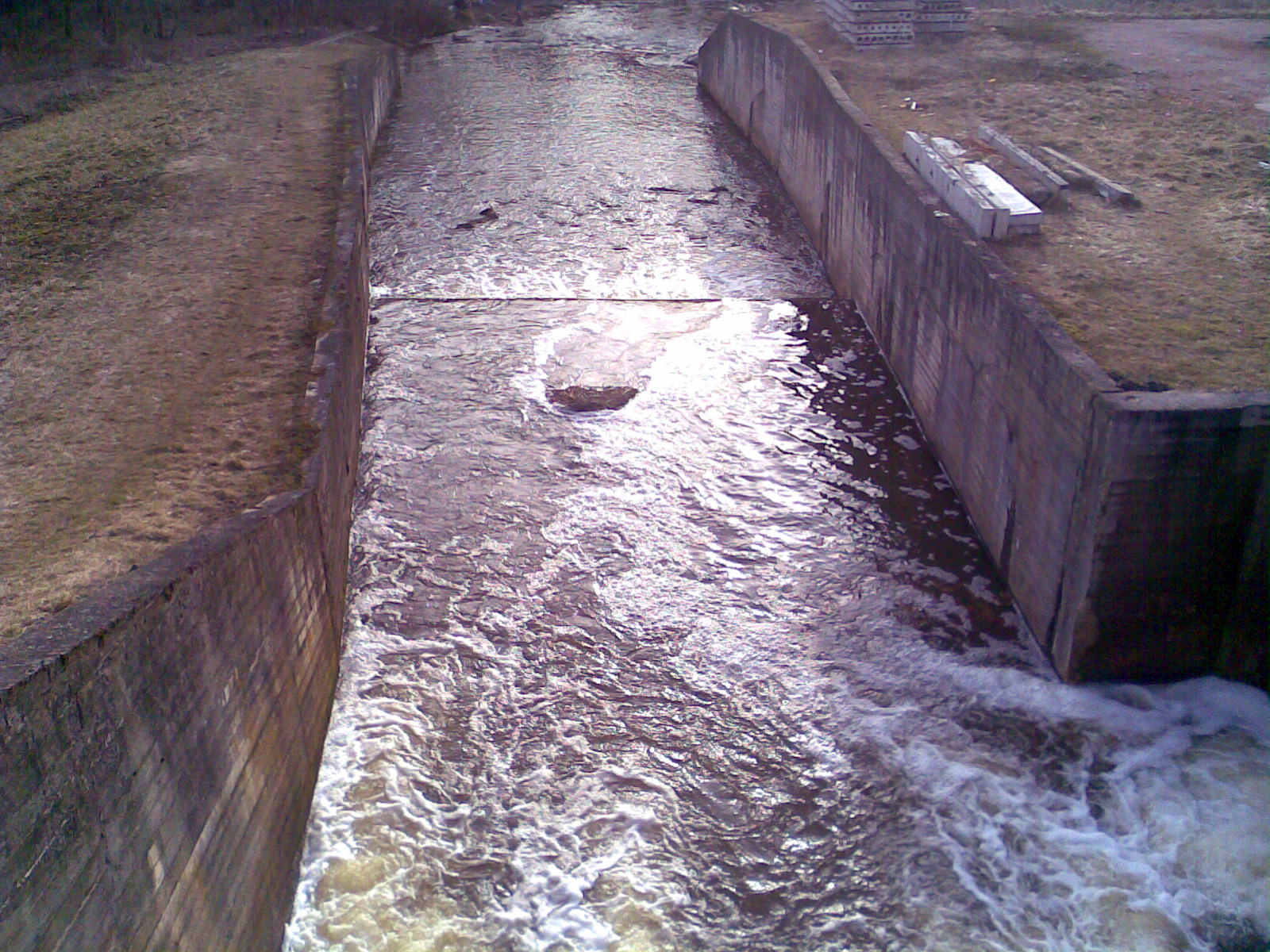

Location
- Country: Lithuania

Physical characteristics
- Source
  - location: Lithuania
- Mouth: Neris
  - coordinates: 55°5′29″N 24°19′30″E
- Length: 22 km (14 mi)
- Basin size: 116.2 km^{2} (44.9 sq mi)

Basin features
- Progression: Neris→ Neman→ Baltic Sea

The Lokys is a stream in Jonava District Municipality, Lithuania. The 22-km stream is a tributary of Neris River. The word Lokys literally means "bear" in Lithuanian.

In 2005, an adventure park "Lokės pėda" ("Bear's Foot") was established in the Lokys valley, by the Lokėnėliai village.
