= Upninkai =

- Village
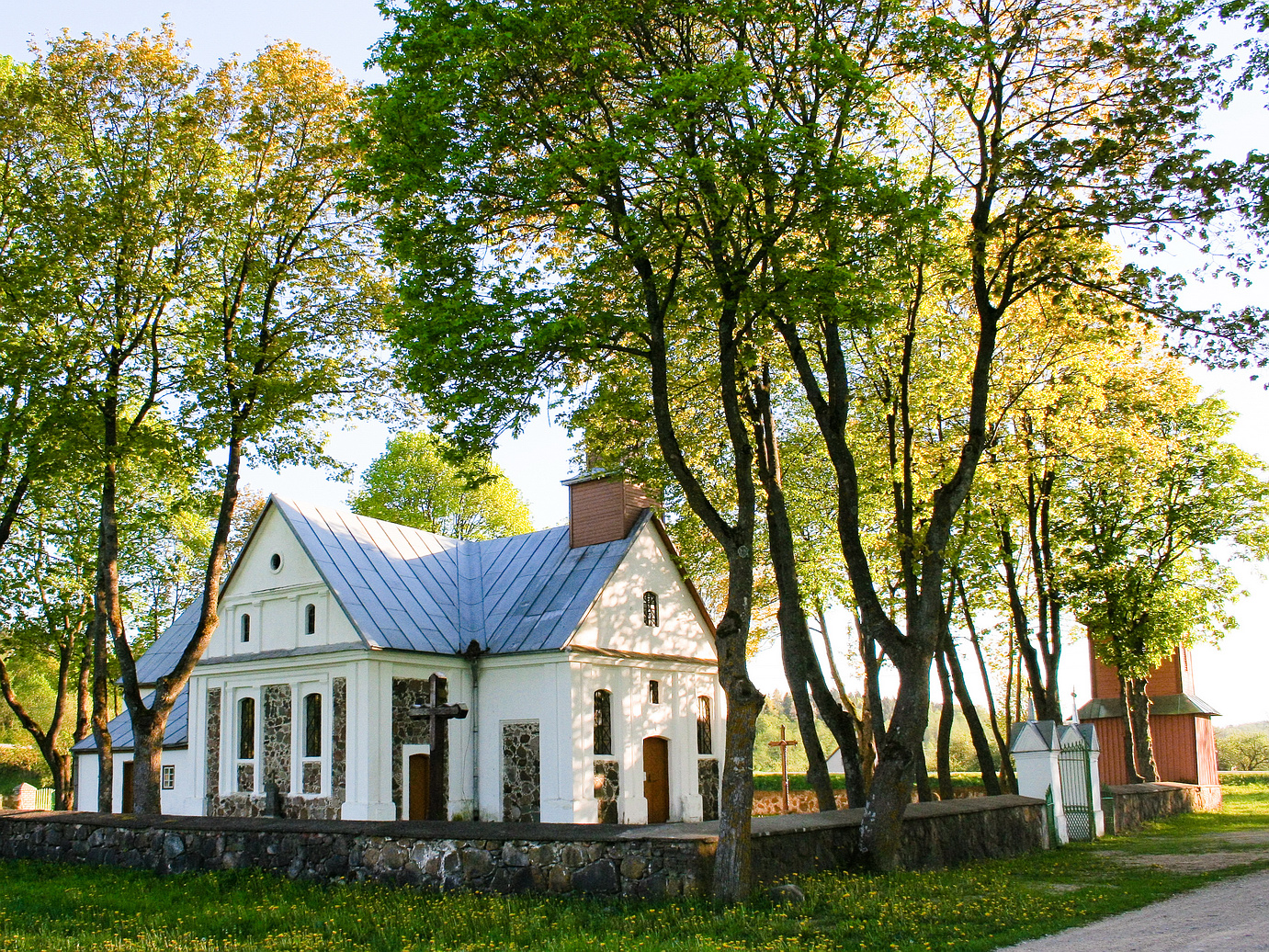
- The church in Upninkai

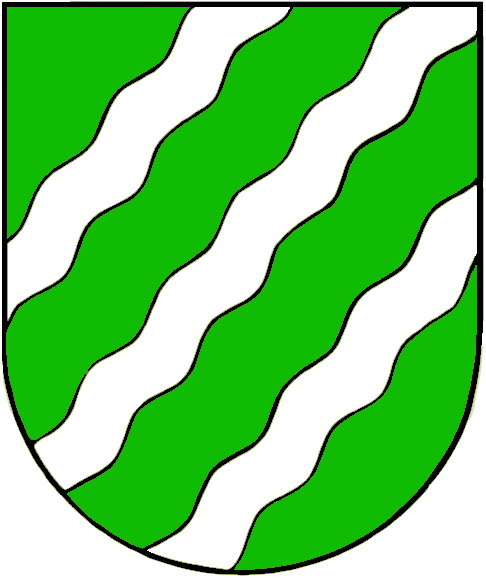
- Coat of arms

- Location of Upninkai
- Coordinates: 55°05′N 24°32′E
- Country: Lithuania
- Ethnographic region: Aukštaitija
- County: Kaunas County
- Municipality: Jonava district municipality
- Eldership: Upninkai eldership
- Capital of: Upninkai eldership
- First mentioned: 1422

Population (2021)
  - Total: 641
- Time zone: UTC+2 (EET)
  - Summer (DST): UTC+3 (EEST)

Upninkai is the largest village in Jonava district, Lithuania. It is situated 8 kilometres (5.0 mi) southwest of Vepriai on the left bank of the Šventoji River. According to the 2011 census, it had population of 786.

== History ==
Upninkai was first mentioned in 1442 in the will of Kristinas Astikas who was the first known lord of Upninkai lands. His son Radvila Astikas built the first church there before 1477. The village had a Protestant church from the late 16th century until 1650. During the 17th century, Upninkai competed with Ukmergė for trade and influence. In 1842, the entire town burned down and did not recover. A persistent priest converted the former manor's surviving brick granary into the present Neoclassical Roman Catholic church of Archangel Michael. According to the census of 1923, Upninkai had 75 residents. The population grew more than ten-fold between 1970 and 1979, increasing from 67 to 847.
