= Milagainiai =

- Village
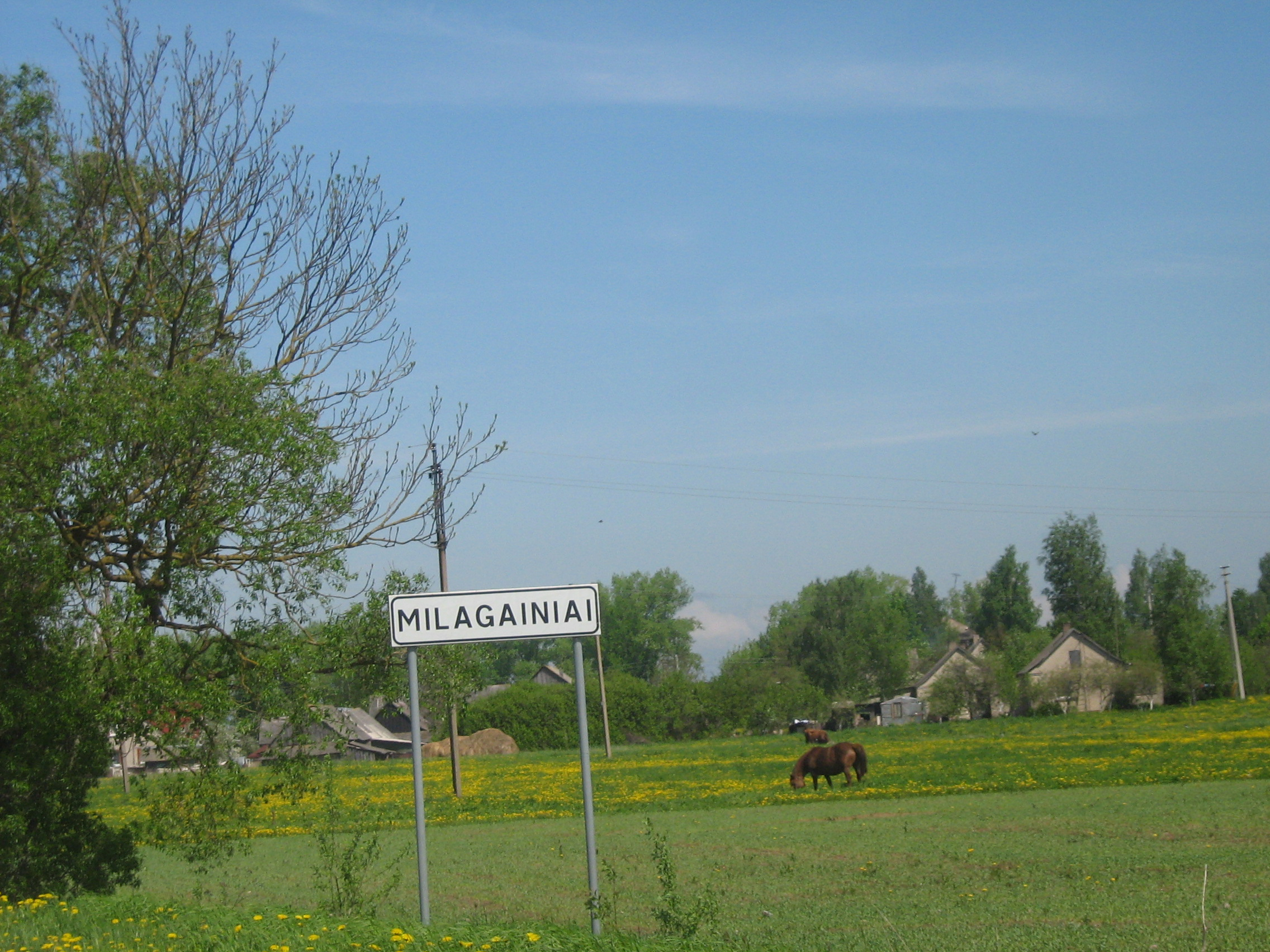

- Location of Šilai in Lithuania
- Coordinates: 55°11′20″N 24°22′50″E
- Country: Lithuania
- County: Kaunas County
- Municipality: Jonava

Population (2001)
  - Total: 124
- Time zone: UTC+2 (EET)
  - Summer (DST): UTC+3 (EEST)

Milagainiai is a village in Jonava district municipality, in Kaunas County, in central Lithuania. According to the 2001 census, the village has a population of 124 people.
