= Jonava District Municipality =

Jonava District Municipality Jonavos rajono savivaldybė
- District Municipality
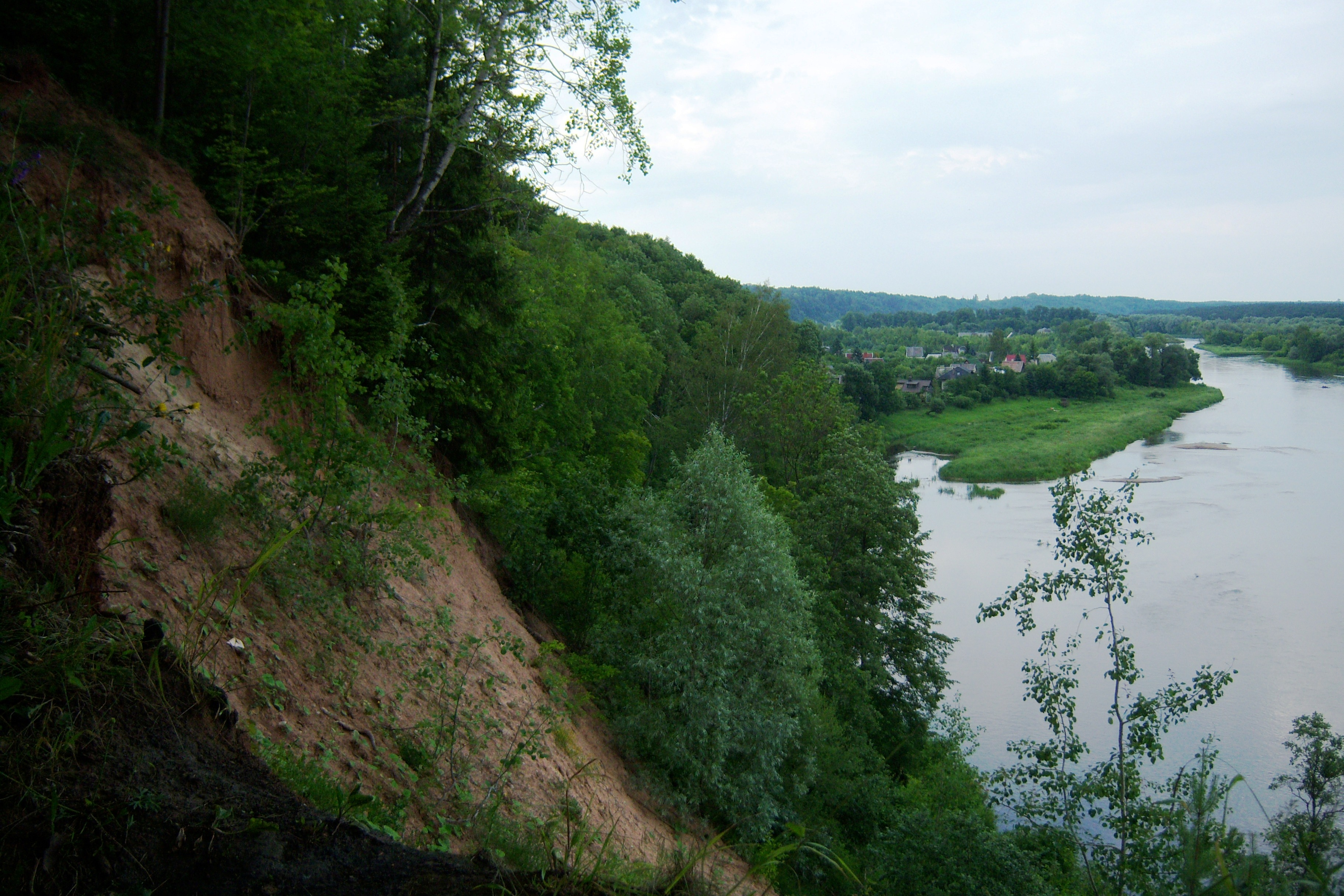
- Andruškoniai exposure

- Flag Coat of arms Brandmark

- Location of Jonava District Municipality within Lithuania

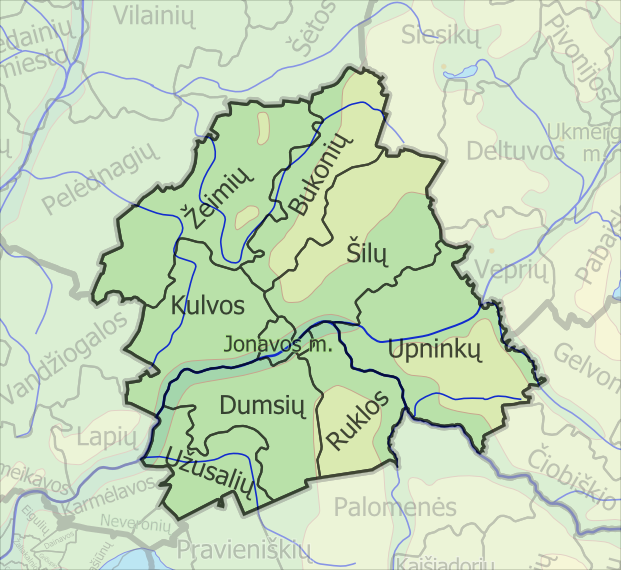
- Location of Jonava
- Coordinates: 55°4′25″N 24°16′33″E
- Country: Lithuania
- Region: Aukštaitija
- County: Kaunas County
- Established: 1950 (76 years ago)
- Capital: Jonava
- Elderships: 9

Government
  - Type: City Council
  - Body: Jonava District Council
  - Mayor: Povilas Beišys (LSDP)
  - Leading: Social Democratic Party 18 / 25

Area
  - Total: 943 km^{2} (364 sq mi)
  - Rank: 40th
- Elevation: 113 m (371 ft)

Population (2022)
  - Total: 41,304
  - Rank: 13th
  - Density: 43.8/km^{2} (113/sq mi)
  - Rank: 16th
- Time zone: UTC+2 (EET)
  - Summer (DST): UTC+3 (EEST)
- ZIP Codes: 55025–55550
- Phone code: +370 (349)
- Website: www.jonava.lt

Jonava District Municipality is one of 60 municipalities in Lithuania.

== Structure ==
District structure:

- 1 city – Jonava;
- 3 towns – Panoteriai, Rukla and Žeimiai;
- 277 villages.
- 9 elderships - Bukonys Eldership, Jonava City Eldership, Kulva Eldership, Rukla Eldership, Šilai Eldership, Šveicarija Eldership, Upninkai Eldership, Užusaliai Eldership, Žeimiai Eldership.

Biggest population (2001):

- Jonava – 34954
- Rukla – 2376
- Upninkai – 1019
- Žeimiai – 962
- Šveicarija – 848
- Užusaliai – 844
- Bukonys – 657
- Kuigaliai – 455
- Šilai – 441
- Išorai – 437

== Elderships ==
Jonava District Municipality is divided into 9 elderships:

Eldership (Administrative Center)	Area	Population (2021)
Bukonys (Bukonys)	108 km^{2} (26,687.38 acres; 41.70 sq mi)	1,194
Jonava City (Jonava)	10.6 km^{2} (2,619.32 acres; 4.09 sq mi)	27,381
Kulva (Kulva)	113 km^{2} (27,922.91 acres; 43.63 sq mi)	1,863
Rukla (Rukla)	80 km^{2} (19,768.43 acres; 30.89 sq mi)	2,210
Šilai (Šilai)	143 km^{2} (35,336.07 acres; 55.21 sq mi)	1,670
Šveicarija (Šveicarija)	82 km^{2} (20,262.64 acres; 31.66 sq mi)	2,229
Upninkai (Upninkai)	173 km^{2} (42,749.23 acres; 66.80 sq mi)	1,076
Užusaliai (Užusaliai)	81 km^{2} (20,015.54 acres; 31.27 sq mi)	2,198
Žeimiai (Žeimiai)	152 km^{2} (37,560.02 acres; 58.69 sq mi)	1,774

== Schools ==
- Barupės pagrindinė mokykla
- Batėgalos pagrindinė mokykla
- Bukonių pagrindinė mokykla
- Janina Miščiukaitė School of Art
- Jonavos Jeronimo Ralio vidurinė mokykla
- Jonavos Justino Vareikio pagrindinė mokykla
- Jonavos Lietavos pagrindinė mokykla
- Jonavos Neries pagrindinė mokykla
- Jonavos Raimundo Samulevičiaus pagrindinė mokykla
- Jonavos Santarvės vidurinė mokykla
- Jonavos Senamiesčio gimnazija
- Kulvos Abraomo Kulviečio pagrindinė mokykla
- Panoterių Petro Vaičiūno pagrindinė mokykla
- Ruklos Jono Stanislausko vidurinė mokykla
- Šveicarijos pagrindinė mokykla
- Upninkų pagrindinė mokykla
- Užusalių pagrindinė mokykla
- Viešoji įstaiga Jonavos suaugusiųjų švietimo centras
- Žeimių vidurinė mokykla
