= Referendums in Lithuania =

There have been fifteen referendums in Lithuania since it declared independence from the Soviet Union on 11 March 1990. Because of strict requirements, only four referendums have been successful. Older Lithuanian laws required that more than half of all registered voters (not half of voters who participate) would vote in support of a proposal for it to become a binding obligation to the government. In 2002, this requirement was lowered to one third of all registered voters.

The procedure to call for a referendum is also challenging. The initiators need to present 300,000 signatures of registered voters in three months or the Seimas, the Parliament of Lithuania, has to approve it by a quarter of all the members of the Seimas. Despite the difficulties, the idea to call referendums is very popular among politicians.

== 2002 law changes ==
In anticipation of the 2003 referendum regarding membership of the European Union, the Law on Referendum was passed on 4 June 2002.

The law prescribes that the voting is conducted based on democratic principles: universal, direct, and equal suffrage and secret ballot. There are two types of referendums: mandatory and consultative (deliberative). Mandatory referendums must be held to:

1. Amend Chapters 1 (The State of Lithuania) and 14 (Amending the Constitution) of the Constitution of Lithuania
2. Amend the 8 June 1992 Constitutional Act, "On Non-Alignment of the Republic of Lithuania to Post-Soviet Eastern Alliances"
3. Approve participation in international organizations if membership requires partial transfer of the scope of competence of Government bodies to the institutions of international organizations or the jurisdiction.
4. Other mandatory or consultative referendums might be held if enough registered voters express support by signing the petition which specify what type of referendums it should be.

The law lowered the requirements for the number of votes needed to approve the resolution. For consultative referendums, a half of all registered voters need to participate and a half of those participating need to vote in favor. Seimas then have a month to decide on the resolution. For mandatory referendums, instead of a half of all registered voters, it now demands one third. In addition, more than a half of all voters need to participate, and of those participating, a half needs to vote in favor. There are exceptions to this rule:

1. To change the first sentence ("The State of Lithuania shall be an independent, democratic Republic") of the Constitution and to amend the Constitutional Act of 8 June 1992 requires approval of at least three quarters of all citizens registered to vote.
2. To amend Chapters 1 through 14 of the Constitution it requires approval of more than half of all registered voters.
3. A decision on participation in international organizations will be adopted if it has been approved by more than one half of the voters who have participated in the referendum. This exception was adopted on February 25, 2003, just 2.5 months before the referendum on the European Union.

The law also lowered the number of Seimas votes needed to announce a referendum from one third to one quarter. However, the requirements for citizen-initiated referendum are the same: they need to collect 300,000 signatures of registered voters in three months.

== Referendum results ==
The successful referendums are marked in light green, while failed ones are in pink. The color denotes which number was used to determine the outcome. Two referendums failed on two counts: they not only did not receive support from more than 50% of all registered voters, but also less than 50% of the voters came to vote. They are deemed not to have taken place.

#	Date	Topic	Voter turnout (%)	Voted "Yes" (%)		Voted "No" (%)	
#	Date	Topic	Voter turnout (%)	from total	from voters	from total	from voters
1	9 February 1991	Demand independence from the Soviet Union	84.74	76.46	90.24	5.54	6.54
2	23 May 1992	Restore the institution of the President of Lithuania	59.18	40.99	69.27	15.13	25.57
3	14 June 1992	Demand immediate withdrawal of Russian troops and compensation for damages from the Soviet Union	76.05	68.95	90.67	5.51	7.25
4	25 October 1992	Approve the Constitution of Lithuania	75.26	56.75	75.42	15.78	20.98
5	27 August 1994	Pass Law on Illegal Privatization, Depreciated Deposits, and Broken Laws	36.89	30.85	83.63	3.81	10.34
6	20 October 1996	Amend Articles 55, 57, and 131 of the Constitution of Lithuania	52.11	33.86	65.00	9.18	17.63
7	20 October 1996	Should the deposits be compensated by funds acquired from privatization	52.46	38.97	74.31	10.01	19.10
8	10 November 1996	Amend Article 47 of the Constitution of Lithuania	39.73	17.24	43.41	15.91	40.05
9	10–11 May 2003	Approve Lithuania's membership in the European Union	63.37	57.00	89.95	5.59	8.82
10	12 October 2008	Extend the operation of the Ignalina Nuclear Power Plant	48.44	42.91	88.59	4.03	8.32
11	14 October 2012	Approve the construction of Visaginas Nuclear Power Plant	52.58	18.52	35.23	34.05	64.77
12	29 June 2014	Ban sale of Lithuanian land to non-citizens	14.98	10.60	70.77	3.95	26.40
13	12 May 2019	Reduce the number of members of the Seimas	47.45	35.25	76.19	11.02	23.81
14	12 May 2019	Allow dual citizenship	52.78	38.46	73.92	13.57	26.08
15	12 May 2024	Allow multiple citizenships	59.51	43.44	74.49	14.88	25.51
