= 2024 Lithuanian constitutional referendum =

- 12 May 2024
- Outcome: Rejected due to low turnout.

Article 12 of the Constitution of the Republic of Lithuania to allow Lithuanians to hold dual citizenship
Yes	74.49%
No	25.51%

A constitutional referendum was held in Lithuania on 12 May 2024, alongside the first round of the presidential elections. Voters were asked whether they approve of a constitutional amendment to allow Lithuanian citizens to hold dual citizenship. The results showed that a majority of voters were in favour of the proposal. However, the initiative failed to pass due to insufficient turnout.

== Background ==
As holding dual citizenship is banned in most cases, (Note: Per Lithuanian law, dual citizenship is only granted to those who left the country before the restoration of independence from the Soviet Union in 1990 and their descendants.) around 1,000 Lithuanian citizens give up their citizenship each year to take another citizenship. Concerns have been raised over the effects of the citizenship requirements on the country's demography, given the population decline which saw the Lithuanian population decrease from 3.5 million in 1990 to 2.8 million in 2024.

A referendum on the same issue was held in 2019. Although 74% voted in favour, the number of affirmative votes was below the 50% of all registered voters required to validate the referendum.

The holding of the 2024 referendum was approved by the Seimas on 23 May 2023 by a vote of 111–0.

The Lithuanian diaspora is estimated at two million people and is largely concentrated in countries such as the United States, United Kingdom, Brazil, Russia, and Canada. It is estimated that there are around 600,000 people of Lithuanian descent living in the United States.

== Campaign ==
The "Yes" vote was endorsed by presidential candidates Giedrimas Jeglinskas, Aurelijus Veryga and Dainius Žalimas, as well as most parties across the political spectrum. President Gitanas Nausėda supported addressing the dual citizenship question after the failed 2019 referendum.

Position	Name	Ideology	Ref
Yes	Homeland Union - Lithuanian Christian Democrats (TS–LKD)	Christian democracy Liberal conservatism Lithuanian nationalism Pro-Europeanism	
Yes	Social Democratic Party of Lithuania (LSDP)	Social democracy Pro-Europeanism	
Yes	Labour Party (DP)	Populism	
Yes	Union of Democrats "For Lithuania" (DSVL)	Social conservatism Green conservatism Pro-Europeanism	
Yes	Lithuanian Farmers and Greens Union (LVŽS)	Centrism; Agrarianism; Green conservatism Social conservatism	
Yes	Freedom Party (LP)	Liberalism; Progressivism; Pro-Europeanism	
Yes	Liberals' Movement (LRLS)	Liberalism; Classical liberalism Conservative liberalism Pro-Europeanism	
Yes	Lithuanian Green Party (LŽP)	Green liberalism Pro-Europeanism	
No	National Alliance (NS)	National conservatism Christian conservatism Soft Euroscepticism	

A study by the Government of Lithuania showed that 60 percent of respondents intended to participate in the referendum.

== Opinion polls ==
Pollster	Fieldwork date	Sample size			
Pollster	Fieldwork date	Sample size	For	Against	Other/ Undecided
Vilmorus	22 November–2 December 2023	1,000	51.7	33.2	15.1
Baltijos tyrimai	23 October–7 November 2023	1,013	60	26	14
2019 referendum		1,322,135	73.92	26.08	-

== Results ==
As the votes in favour represented around 43% of registered voters, and the referendum required an absolute majority of registered voters (not just participating voters) to be approved, the proposal failed, similar to the previous one in 2019.

Do you agree with the amendment of Article 12 of the Constitution of the Republic of Lithuania?
Choice	Votes	%
For	1,043,265	74.49
Against	357,274	25.51
Total	1,400,539	100.00
Valid votes	1,400,539	97.98
Invalid/blank votes	28,843	2.02
Total votes	1,429,382	100.00
Registered voters/turnout	2,401,807	59.51
Source: VRK

== Aftermath ==
Following the failure of the referendum, MP Dalia Asanavičiūtė, who initiated the proposal, said that the results had put Lithuania into “a situation of legal impossibility” where dual citizenship cannot be expanded through a constitutional amendment. This led her to file a bill in the Seimas on 13 May to amend the Law on Citizenship to allow Lithuanian citizens in EU and NATO member states to keep their Lithuanian passports. Seimas Speaker Viktorija Čmilytė-Nielsen also expressed disappointment at the outcome of the referendum, but opposed lowering the threshold for a future vote on the issue. President Gitanas Nausėda said that the referendum organisers made insufficient efforts to present their case to voters. However, he suggested that a lower threshold for such measures to pass be implemented in the future.

== See also ==
- Referendums in Lithuania
