= 2020 Lithuanian parliamentary election =

- 11 October 2020 (first round); 25 October 2020 (second round)
- All 141 seats in the Seimas; 71 seats needed for a majority
- Turnout: 47.81% (▼2.80pp)
Party	Leader	Vote %	Seats	+/–
TS–LKD	Gabrielius Landsbergis	25.77	50	+19
LVŽS	Ramūnas Karbauskis	18.07	32	−22
DP	Viktor Uspaskich	9.77	10	+8
LSDP	Gintautas Paluckas	9.58	13	−4
LP	Aušrinė Armonaitė	9.45	11	New
LS	Viktorija Čmilytė-Nielsen	7.04	13	−1
LLRA–KŠS	Valdemar Tomaševski	4.97	3	−5
LSDDP	Gediminas Kirkilas	3.28	3	New
PLT	Remigijus Žemaitaitis	2.06	1	New
LŽP	Remigijus Lapinskas	1.70	1	0
Independents	–	–	4	0
This lists parties that won seats. See the complete results below.

Prime Minister before	Prime Minister after
Saulius Skvernelis; Independent (endorsed by LVŽS)	Ingrida Šimonytė; Independent (endorsed by TS-LKD)

Parliamentary elections were held in Lithuania on 11 and 25 October 2020 to elect the 141 members of the Seimas. 71 were elected in single-member constituencies using the two-round system, and the remaining 70 in a single nationwide constituency using proportional representation. The first round was held on 11 October and the second round on 25 October.

In the context of the COVID-19 pandemic, the 2020 Lithuanian parliamentary election had the second-lowest turnout in first round elections to the Seimas since the Republic of Lithuania was restored in the early 1990s (the lowest occurred in 2004).

== Electoral system ==
The Seimas has 141 members, elected to a four-year term in parallel voting, with 71 members elected in single-seat constituencies and 70 members elected by proportional representation. The voting in the elections is open to all citizens of Lithuania who are at least 18 years old.

Parliament members in the 71 single-seat constituencies are elected in a majority vote, with a run-off held within 15 days, if necessary. The remaining 70 seats are allocated to the participating political parties using the largest remainder method. Parties normally need to receive at least 5% (7% for multi-party electoral lists) of the votes to be eligible for a seat. Candidates take the seats allocated to their parties based on the preference lists submitted before the election and adjusted by preference votes given by the voters.

To be eligible for election, candidates must be at least 25 years old on the election day, not under allegiance to a foreign state and permanently reside in Lithuania. Persons serving or due to serve a sentence imposed by the court 65 days before the election are not eligible. Also, judges, citizens performing military service, and servicemen of professional military service and officials of statutory institutions and establishments may not stand for election. In addition, a person who has been removed from office through impeachment may not be elected.

== Background ==
The 2016 election was a surprise landslide victory for the Lithuanian Farmers and Greens Union (LVŽS), which won 54 seats, including half of the single-member constituencies. The Skvernelis Cabinet took office with the support of LVŽS and Social Democratic Party of Lithuania (LSDP). The latter party split in 2017 due to disagreement about government participation, with some of its MPs forming the Social Democratic Labour Party of Lithuania (LSDDP) with members of the Labour Party. Lacking support in Parliament, the government passed a cooperation agreement with Order and Justice (TT) in 2018. After the 2019 presidential election, Order and Justice and the Electoral Action of Poles in Lithuania – Christian Families Alliance joined a coalition. Later the same year, Order and Justice were expelled from the coalition.

A proposal to reduce the size of the Seimas from 141 to 121 seats failed following a referendum held in May 2019. In the same year, Ramūnas Karbauskis and Naglis Puteikis proposed bill, which reduced electoral threshold from 5% to 3%, but due to President of the Republic of Lithuania veto, this proposal was not implemented.

In 2020, single-member constituencies were redrawn: one constituency was added in Vilnius, one constituency was removed in Kaunas, new worldwide constituency was established and constituencies in rural areas were enlarged.

== COVID-19 effects ==
Due to the COVID-19 pandemic, Central Electoral Commission proposed extension on early voting (four days instead two days). In the second round special polling places for self-isolating voters were set up in Vilnius, Kaunas, Šiauliai and Raseiniai districts.

On 21 October, a few days before the second round, Lithuanian municipalities were divided into green, yellow and red "risk zones", with de facto lockdown rules, mask mandates and limits on capacities.

== Parties ==
Party / Electoral list	Abbr.	Leader	Ideology	Political position	2016 election	
Party / Electoral list	Abbr.	Leader	Ideology	Political position	Votes (%)	Seats
Lithuanian Farmers and Greens Union; Lietuvos valstiečių ir žaliųjų sąjunga	LVŽS	Ramūnas Karbauskis	Technocracy; Agrarianism; Green conservatism	Centre to centre-right	22.45%	54 / 141
Homeland Union; Tėvynės sąjunga – Lietuvos krikščionys demokratai	TS–LKD	Gabrielius Landsbergis	Conservatism; Christian democracy Liberal conservatism	Centre-right	22.63%	31 / 141
Social Democratic Party of Lithuania; Lietuvos socialdemokratų partija	LSDP	Gintautas Paluckas	Social democracy Democratic socialism Pro-Europeanism	Centre-left to left-wing	15.04%	17 / 141
Liberal Movement; Lietuvos Respublikos Liberalų sąjūdis	LRLS	Viktorija Čmilytė-Nielsen	Classical liberalism Conservative liberalism Liberalism	Centre-right	9.45%	14 / 141
Freedom and Justice; Laisvė ir teisingumas	LT	Remigijus Žemaitaitis	Conservative liberalism Pro-Europeanism	Centre-right	7.78%	8 / 141
Electoral Action of Poles in Lithuania – Christian Families Alliance; Lietuvos lenkų rinkimų akcija – Krikščioniškų šeimų sąjunga Akcja Wyborcza Polaków na Litwie – Związek Chrześcijańskich Rodzin	LLRA–KŠS	Valdemar Tomaševski	Polish minority interests Christian democracy Conservatism	Centre-right	5.72%	8 / 141
Labour Party; Darbo Partija	DP	Viktor Uspaskich	Social liberalism Populism	Centre to centre-left	4.88%	2 / 141
Centre Party – Nationalists; Centro partija – Tautininkai	CP-T	Naglis Puteikis	Agrarianism; Euroscepticism	Centre	6.88%	1 / 141
Centre Party – Nationalists; Centro partija – Tautininkai	CP-T	Naglis Puteikis	Lithuanian nationalism National conservatism	Right-wing	6.88%	1 / 141
Lithuanian Green Party; Lietuvos Žaliųjų Partija	LŽP	Remigijus Lapinskas	Green liberalism Pro-Europeanism	Centre	2.03%	0 / 141
Lithuanian People's Party; Lietuvos liaudies partija	LLP	Vaidotas Prunskus	Russophilia; Left-wing nationalism Hard Euroscepticism	Left-wing	1.05%	0 / 141
The Way of Courage; Drąsos Kelias	DK	Jonas Varkala	Populism; Anti-corruption		0.29%	0 / 141
Union of Intergenerational Solidarity – Cohesion for Lithuania; Kartų Solidarumo Sąjunga – Santalka Lietuvai	KSSL	Arvydas Juozaitis	Pensioners' interests Single-issue politics Nationalism		Did not run	
Lithuania – For Everyone; Lietuva – visų	LV	Tomas Pačėsas	Interests of the Lithuanian diaspora		Did not run	
Social Democratic Labour Party of Lithuania; Lietuvos socialdemokratų darbo partija	LSDDP	Gediminas Kirkilas	Social democracy Pro-Europeanism; Nordic model	Centre-left	Did not exist Split from LSDP	
Freedom Party; Laisvės Partija	LP	Aušrinė Armonaitė	Liberalism; Social liberalism Progressivism	Centre	Did not exist Split from Liberal Movement	
Christian Union; Krikščionių sąjunga	KS	Rimantas Dagys	Christian democracy Christian social policy Social conservatism	Right-wing	Did not exist Split from Homeland Union	
National Alliance; Nacionalinis Susivienijimas	NS	Vytautas Radžvilas	Lithuanian nationalism Conservatism	Right-wing to far-right	Did not exist	

== Politicians not standing ==
- Irena Degutienė (TS-LKD)
- Antanas Baura (LVŽS)
- Viktoras Rinkevičius (LVŽS)
- Bronius Bradauskas (LSDP)
- Leonard Talmont (LLRA)
- Gintaras Steponavičius (LRLS, independent)
- Virgilijus Poderys (independent)

== Opinion polls ==
Graph of opinion polls conducted View source data.

=== Party vote ===
The following are opinion polls conducted for the legislative elections, measuring estimated percentage of the vote. Highlighted parties successfully pass the electoral threshold to win national list seats.

Polling Firm/Link	Last date of polling	TS-LKD	LVŽS	LSDP	LSDDP	LT	LRLS	LLRA	LCP	DP	Laisves
Baltijos tyrimai	17–27 September 2020	17.7	23	13.9	3.1	7.9	9	5.7	3	8.8	3.3
Spinter tyrimai	16–26 September 2020	19.8	19.2	11.4	3	4.9	9.1	4.8	3	9.8	6.1
Vilmorus	4–12 September 2020	20.8	21	11.8	4.2	5.3	7.7	3.5	2.6	11.7	3.5
Spinter tyrimai	26 August – 4 September 2020	21.7	19.4	12.6	3.7	4.5	5.9	4.5	3.3	8.6	6.8
Baltijos tyrimai	22 August – 4 September 2020	18.8	19.6	18.2	2.7	7.4	8.2	4	4	11.4	4
Norstat	29 July – 31 August 2020	32.7	15.4	13	3.6	3.4	6.1	1.5	1.5	7.6	5.9
Baltijos tyrimai	16–30 July 2020	19.1	22.5	13.9	2.9	8.2	8	4.7	2.8	10.9	4
Spinter tyrimai	16–26 July 2020	22.8	22.1	13.9	-	5.4	8.8	4.7	3.4	7.5	5.7
Vilmorus	10–18 July 2020	25.3	25.8	10.4	4.6	5.4	6.9	3.2	2.3	9.1	2.3
Spinter tyrimai	18–26 June 2020	25.2	19.8	13.5	-	4.9	7.7	5.7	-	8	6.1
Baltijos tyrimai	15–25 June 2020	18.2	22.5	17	2.9	7.8	8.8	6.6	1.9	8.4	3.7

Polling Firm/Link	Last date of polling	TS-LKD	LVŽS	LSDP	LSDDP	TT	LRLS	LLRA	LCP	DP	Laisves
Vilmorus	5–13 June 2020	24.9	23.3	15.9	3.7	5.4	7.5	3.8	3.0	8.0	3.5
OMB Snapshots	1–9 June 2020	22.4	17.4	12.3	4.7	3.2	11.3	1.2	–	12.2	9
Spinter tyrimai	20–29 April 2020	26.4	19.3	13.7	3.2	7.5	8.5	5.9	2.7	6.4	4.3
Spinter tyrimai	17–30 March 2020	30.1	15.1	12.2	3.6	3.6	7.3	5.1	–	6.5	6.5
Vilmorus	5–13 March 2020	29.0	21.1	14.1	4.2	6.4	5.9	2.3	2.5	8.7	3.7
Baltijos tyrimai	13–26 February 2020	24.2	15	15.5	3.1	6.6	11.5	5	2.5	9.1	4
Spinter tyrimai	18–25 February 2020	27.3	14.7	12.3	4.3	4.9	10.1	6.2	2.9	7.5	4
Vilmorus	7–13 February 2020	29.3	19.2	16.0	3.8	9.4	5.1	2.6	1.8	9.7	1.9
Spinter tyrimai	20–28 January 2020	26.6	14.4	11.3	2.9	5.5	9.1	6.1	3.6	9.8	5.7
Vilmorus	10–18 January 2020	26.9	18.4	14.5	3.9	7	5.2	2.7	4.5	9.8	2.1
Baltijos tyrimai	10–21 December 2019	23.7	9.8	17.4	3.1	7.8	7.4	6	4.4	12.7	3.2
Vilmorus	29 November – 7 December 2019	24.7	17.4	13.4	3.5	7.9	6.5	2	3.6	12.1	2.7
Spinter tyrimai	19–29 November 2019	32.9	12.9	13.8	2.5	5.3	11.3	5.6	4.6	12.4	5.8
Baltijos tyrimai	14–27 November 2019	25.2	12	18.9	3.4	4.9	5.6	5.6	3	13.2	3.2
Vilmorus	8–16 November 2019	26.7	17.6	13	3.8	7	7.8	3.3	4.4	12.8	–
Baltijos tyrimai	15–29 October 2019	24.4	10.9	19.6	2.5	4.8	6.9	7.2	4	14.1	2.8
Spinter tyrimai	17–28 October 2019	25.9	14.7	9.9	3.3	7.2	9	4.6	4.1	7.9	5
Vilmorus	4–13 October 2019	24.6	17.5	10.7	5.2	7.5	7.2	2.8	4.2	8.5	3.4
Baltijos tyrimai	21 September – 5 October 2019	26.2	16.4	17.3	2.2	8.3	5.6	5	3.4	8.5	3.4
Spinter tyrimai	18–27 September 2019	26.7	20.3	12.5	2.7	5.4	7.2	4.1	3.1	6.9	4.5
Vilmorus	6–14 September 2019	22	22.3	12.8	4.8	6.7	4.8	3.2	3.6	11.1	2.7
Baltijos tyrimai	26 August – 3 September 2019	19.4	18.6	18	1.7	8.1	7.4	5.1	4.4	10.6	3.4
Baltijos tyrimai	15–29 July 2019	20.2	17.5	18.5	2.6	10	6.8	5	3.9	8.2	3.4
Spinter tyrimai	17–26 July 2019	26.2	16.5	13.6	2.8	7	7.2	4.6	3	7.6	4.3
Vilmorus	5–13 July 2019	25.7	20.2	11.7	4.3	9.4	4.3	3.9	1.9	13.4	4.6
Spinter tyrimai	18–27 June 2019	26.8	18.2	13.9	2.9	6.5	6.1	4.6	2.9	6.9	4.6
Baltijos tyrimai	14–28 June 2019	22.3	20	18.8	1.4	8.6	7.9	5	3.2	7.6	–
Vilmorus	7–15 June 2019	26.3	23.2	12.5	3.4	9.1	4.4	4.7	2.1	10.5	3.4
Baltijos tyrimai	27 May – 9 June 2019	22.4	20.1	17.7	4.8	6.7	5.7	5.8	3	8.4	
2019 European Parliament election	26 May 2019	19.74	12.56	15.88	2.36	2.73	6.59		5.13	8.99	
Spinter tyrimai	20–29 April 2019	27.9	23.7	11.3	−	6.8	8.7	6.3	2.7	7.6	
Baltijos tyrimai	12–26 April 2019	22.5	23.1	12.5	3.9	5.1	5	−	6.8	6.4	
Vilmorus	4–13 April 2019	31	23.5	10.8	4.1	8.9	4.1	4.6	3.8	8.6	
Baltijos tyrimai	25 March – 10 April 2019	23.9	24.7	15.5	5	5.2	4.7	4.3	3.9	8.6	
Spinter tyrimai	18–28 March 2019	25.4	21.4	13.6	−	7.1	8	5.4	4	7	
Vilmorus	24 March 2019	24.7	28.1	12.9	6.2	7.3	4.7	3.5	3.2	8	
Vilmorus	7–15 March 2019	28.7	32.8	15	7.2	8.4	5.4	4	3.7	9.3	
2019 municipal election	3 March 2019	16.05	11.16	13.24	1.66	2.94	5.9	5.2	1.25	5.09	
Spinter tyrimai	18–28 February 2019	27.7	22.5	9.7		5.7	5.2	5.9	2.6	7.3	
Baltijos tyrimai	15–26 February 2019	23.7	21.4	11.4	3.6	9.8	5.7	4.2	5.5	10.5	
Vilmorus	8–17 February 2019	31	27.3	8	3.6	7	5.7	3.4	3.9	7.8	
Baltijos tyrimai	23 January – 3 February 2019	23.9	21.7	12.6	3.6	11.9	6.2	2.9	4.7	8.1	
Vilmorus	26 January 2019	25.4	27.3	10.4	4.5	9.2	4.9	3.8	4.9	9	
Spinter tyrimai	15–26 January 2019	26.4	22.4	10.9	3.1	8.2	4.4	6.5	3.1	6.9	
Vilmorus	11–20 January 2019	24.6	26.5	10.1	4.3	8.9	4.7	3.7	4.7	8.7	
Vilmorus	1–9 December 2018	28.6	23.3	8.9	3.7	10.3	4.3	3.9	4.3	10.7	
Baltijos tyrimai	6 December 2018	27.5	20.7	12.5	5.6	9.9	4	4.1	5.6	8.3	
Spinter tyrimai	19–30 November 2018	26.9	21.9	11.3	3.6	10.9	4.3	6.7	4.8	6	
Baltijos tyrimai	9–26 November 2018	27.4	20.6	12.5	5.5	9.9	3.9	4	5.5	8.2	
Vilmorus	9–18 November 2018	26.9	22.2	8.5	4.2	10.7	6.1	4.1	5.9	10.7	
Spinter tyrimai	16–30 October 2018	25.2	20.2	8.2	4.6	8.2	4.5	5.7	4.3	6.1	
Baltijos tyrimai	10–26 October 2018	23.5	18	12.7	6.7	11	7.3	5.4	5.5	7.5	
Vilmorus, Baltijos tyrimai polling average, October 2018	24 October 2018	26.2	19.3	11.9	5.3	12.6	5.7	4.7	4.3	7.6	
Vilmorus	5–14 October 2018	27.2	21	11.5	4.9	13.3	4	4.9	4	7.7	
Baltijos tyrimai	24 September – 7 October 2018	25.1	17.5	12.1	5.5	11.7	7.3	4.3	4.5	7.5	
Spinter tyrimai	19–26 September 2018	25.5	24.3	7.1	5.8	7.1	5.9	5.9	3.9	6.2	
Vilmorus	7–16 September 2018	24.5	24.9	12.2	7.5	10.6	5.7			10.7	
Spinter tyrimai	24–31 August 2018	23.6	21.8	8	6.2	11	5.2	5.1	6.2	6.7	
Baltijos tyrimai	21–31 August 2018	22.1	20.2	11.9	4.8	9.7	7.9	4.2	7	6.4	
Baltijos tyrimai	16–31 July 2018	19.2	17.9	10.3	5.2	12.8	7.8	5.2	6.7	9.2	
Vilmorus	5–17 July 2018	26.7	24	8.1	5.6	10.8	3.5	4.6	6.4	9.7	
Baltijos tyrimai	30 June – 3 July 2018	19.2	17.9	10.3	5.2	12.8	7.8	5.2	6.7	9.2	
Spinter tyrimai	19–27 June 2018	22.5	20.3	10.2	5.9	10.8	6	5.2	3.8	8.8	
Vilmorus	8–17 June 2018	25.3	22.7	8	7.3	9.4	3	3.2	4.9	10.2	
Baltijos tyrimai	28 May – 5 June 2018	23.4	19.7	8.8	5.8	11.1	5.7	4.6	5.6	9.8	
Spinter tyrimai	22–29 May 2018	24.7	22.5	7.5	6.8	10.3	5.4	5.4	4.3	6.8	
Vilmorus	4–12 May 2018	23.6	20.9	7.4	9.2	11	5.5	4	6.3	10.3	
Baltijos tyrimai	24 April – 4 May 2018	24.8	22.7	9.5	6.6	8.9	8	4.6	4.5	6.2	
Spinter tyrimai	17–26 April 2018	24	21.1	7.2	6.4	10.7	9.7	6.2	4.3	2.3	
Vilmorus	6–15 April 2018	27.9	18.8	7.7	7.9	11.4	7.4	4.2	6.3	4.6	
Baltijos tyrimai	28 March – 8 April 2018	24.2	21.2	13.6		9	10.6	4.5	6	6	
Spinter tyrimai	21–29 March 2018	18.6	16.9	6.5	3.7	7.5	5.8	4	3.3		
Vilmorus	2–10 March 2018	25.1	24.2	15		13.4	7.6	3.7	5.5	2.8	
Baltijos tyrimai	21 February – 4 March 2018	24	17.3	17.3		10.6	10.6	5.3	5.3	5.3	
Spinter tyrimai	19–27 February 2018	24	21.3	11.3		10.6	7	4.1	6.5		
Vilmorus	9–18 February 2018	27	21.7	12.2		11.2	8.5	5.4	4.1	6.9	
Baltijos tyrimai	18–30 January 2018	24.4	16.3	18.5		9.2	9.4	5.3	6	6.7	
Vilmorus	12–21 January 2018	29.4	22.9	13.7		13.8	6.6	3.8	3.1	4.4	
Spinter tyrimai	11–19 December 2017	26.4	21	13.1		10.6	6.9	5.6	7.3	2.8	
Vilmorus	1–10 December 2017	27.7	22.7	13.7		9.5	6.8	5.2	6.9	4.2	
Baltijos tyrimai	20 November – 4 December 2017	27.6	19.7	16.8		8.9	7.2	3.6	7.6	4.6	
RAIT	10–27 November 2017	19	16	10		4	5		6		
Spinter tyrimai	16–24 November 2017	27.4	26.1	10.7		8.3	7.1	6.6	4.4	2.8	
Vilmorus	10–19 November 2017	26.5	20.8	13.5		9.6	6.8	6.5	7	5.3	
Baltijos tyrimai	25 October – 8 November 2017	25.9	24	16.2		7.8	6.8	7.8	3.9	2.6	
RAIT	14–29 October 2017	18	15	11		4	6		4		
Spinter tyrimai	16–28 October 2017	26.8	23.9	10.1		6.7	7.8	7	7.5	2.8	
Vilmorus	5–16 October 2017	24.7	20.6	16.6		10.3	6.8	6.9	5.1	4.3	
Baltijos tyrimai	25 September – 8 October 2017	23.4	20.3	16.3		10.4	11.2	5.3	4.4	4.9	
Spinter tyrimai	19–28 September 2017	23.9	23.3	12.8		6.9	8	6.9	5.4	2.8	
RAIT	15–26 September 2017	16	17	11			9				
Vilmorus	8–17 September 2017	24.9	23.8	15.9		7.9	7.2	4.2	5.8	5.4	
Baltijos tyrimai	29 August – 9 September 2017	20.2	19.3	15.1		10.4	13.8	6.3	5.2	6.3	
Spinter tyrimai	21–28 August 2017	22.6	22	15.6		6.9	9.4	5.5	4.1	2.7	
RAIT	10–24 August 2017	18	18	11		4	9		2		
Baltijos tyrimai	3–17 August 2017	19.4	21.7	16.2		8.4	10.8	7.8	5.4	5.8	
RAIT	15–27 July 2017	17	16	12		4	7		4	4	
Spinter tyrimai	17–23 July 2017	22.1	22.6	15		7	9.3	5.3	5.3	2.6	
Vilmorus	30 June – 9 July 2017	23.7	22.7	17		8.2	8.6	6.1	5.6	2.9	
RAIT	9 June – 2 July 2017	23.8	28.3	13.4		4.4	13.4	2.9	5.9	4.4	
Spinter tyrimai	19–26 June 2017	20.9	23.8	17.1		8	10	6.3	4.4	2.1	
Baltijos tyrimai	13–26 June 2017	18.8	20.2	18.8		10.1	10.1	8.6	4.3	5.7	
Vilmorus	2–10 June 2017	26.2	26.6	18.1		6.6	8.4	4.5	6.1	3.2	
Baltijos tyrimai	25 May – 6 June 2017	16.3	21.3	21.8		11.9	9.2	8.2	4.2	4.7	
Spinter tyrimai	19–25 May 2017	19.4	28.1	17.1		6.6	9.6	6.6	4.4	2.5	
RAIT	13–18 May 2017	20.8	30.5	11.1		8.3	11.1	2.7	4.1	2.7	
Vilmorus	5–13 May 2017	23.1	28.7	15.5		6.5	7.7	4.4	5.7	2.7	
Baltijos tyrimai	26 April – 7 May 2017	20.3	29	18.8		6.9	9.7	5.7	2.9	4.6	
Spinter tyrimai	19–26 April 2017	22	30.1	16.9		5.1	8.3	4.3	4.5	0.7	
RAIT	8–25 April 2017	18.6	34.6	13.3		4	10.6	2.6		4	
Vilmorus	1–9 April 2017	22.2	33.2	16.8		5.6	8.8	2.9	4.7	2.8	
Spinter tyrimai	16–23 March 2017	17.3	34.6	11.1		5.1	10.8	5.6		2	
RAIT	10–26 March 2017	14.4	37.6	13		4.3	13	2.8		2.8	
Vilmorus	8–12 March 2017	22.2	35.5	12.7		4	8.3	4.9	4.7	3.7	
Spinter tyrimai	17–24 February 2017	19.3	32.7	11.5		4.6	9.6	5.8		2.7	
Vilmorus	10–15 February 2017	19.1	37.3	15.2		4.3	6.8	4.3		5.2	
RAIT	9–26 February 2017	22.5	46.7	14.5		4.8	11.2	3.2		4.8	
Spinter tyrimai	17–25 January 2017	18.7	37	14.2		4.1	8.5	5.5		2.7	
RAIT	January 2017	13.4	26.5	10.2		3	6.1			2	
Vilmorus	12–22 January 2017	16.6	39.8	15.8		3.5	8	3.5		3.2	
Baltijos tyrimai	12–22 December 2016	15.4	44.7	12.8		5.2	6.2	5.2	3.8	5.1	
Spinter tyrimai	12–20 December 2016	16.7	42.7	12.3		5.9	7.9	5		2.5	
Vilmorus	2–10 December 2016	17	45.5	11.2			6.2				
Baltijos tyrimai	24 November – 4 December 2016	15.3	46.7	12.8		4.5	9	4.1	2.7	2.7	
Spinter tyrimai	18–25 November 2016	16.4	36.1	14		7	12.4	5.2	3.6	2.1	
	2016 Elections	22.63	22.45	15.04		5.55	9.45	5.72	6.32	4.88	

The following are seat projections for the election:

Source	Date	TS-LKD	LVŽS	LSDP	LSDDP	LT	LRLS	LLRA	LCP	DP	Laisves	LŽP	Independents
Result 2020	11–25 October 2020	50	32	13	3	1	13	3	0	10	11	1	4
Europe Elects	24 October 2020	42	38	17	2	1	10	3	0	10	11	1	6
Result 2016	9–23 October 2016	31	54	17	-	8	14	8	1	2	-	1	4

== Results ==
Party	Proportional			Constituency (first round)			Constituency (second round)			Total seats	+/–
Party	Votes	%	Seats	Votes	%	Seats	Votes	%	Seats	Total seats	+/–
Homeland Union	292,124	25.77	23	268,919	24.16	1	356,599	40.17	26	50	+19
Lithuanian Farmers and Greens Union	204,791	18.07	16	169,370	15.22	0	209,718	23.62	16	32	−22
Labour Party	110,773	9.77	9	88,408	7.94	0	8,077	0.91	1	10	+8
Social Democratic Party of Lithuania	108,649	9.58	8	130,851	11.76	0	75,561	8.51	5	13	−4
Freedom Party	107,093	9.45	8	72,046	6.47	0	72,288	8.14	3	11	New
Liberal Movement	79,755	7.04	6	103,238	9.28	0	60,841	6.85	7	13	−1
Electoral Action of Poles in Lithuania	56,386	4.97	0	53,007	4.76	2	14,837	1.67	1	3	−5
Social Democratic Labour Party of Lithuania	37,197	3.28	0	51,923	4.67	0	26,199	2.95	3	3	New
Centre Party – Nationalists	26,769	2.36	0	20,468	1.84	0	5,405	0.61	0	0	−1
National Alliance	25,098	2.21	0	14,938	1.34	0				0	New
Freedom and Justice	23,355	2.06	0	28,641	2.57	0	9,631	1.08	1	1	New
Lithuanian Green Party	19,303	1.70	0	35,205	3.16	0	6,648	0.75	1	1	0
The Way of Courage	13,337	1.18	0	2,573	0.23	0				0	0
Lithuania – For Everyone	11,352	1.00	0	7,917	0.71	0				0	New
Christian Union	8,825	0.78	0	17,433	1.57	0				0	New
Union of Intergenerational Solidarity – Cohesion for Lithuania	5,808	0.51	0	2,753	0.25	0				0	0
Lithuanian People's Party	2,946	0.26	0	1,087	0.10	0				0	0
Lithuanian List				1,043	0.09	0				0	–1
Independents				43,083	3.87	0	41,938	4.72	4	4	0
Total	1,133,561	100.00	70	1,112,903	100.00	3	887,742	100.00	68	141	0
Valid votes	1,133,561	96.47		1,112,903	94.74		887,742	96.03			
Invalid/blank votes	41,465	3.53		61,822	5.26		36,667	3.97			
Total votes	1,175,026	100.00		1,174,725	100.00		924,409	100.00			
Registered voters/turnout	2,457,722	47.81		2,457,722	47.80		2,355,726	39.24			
Source: VRK

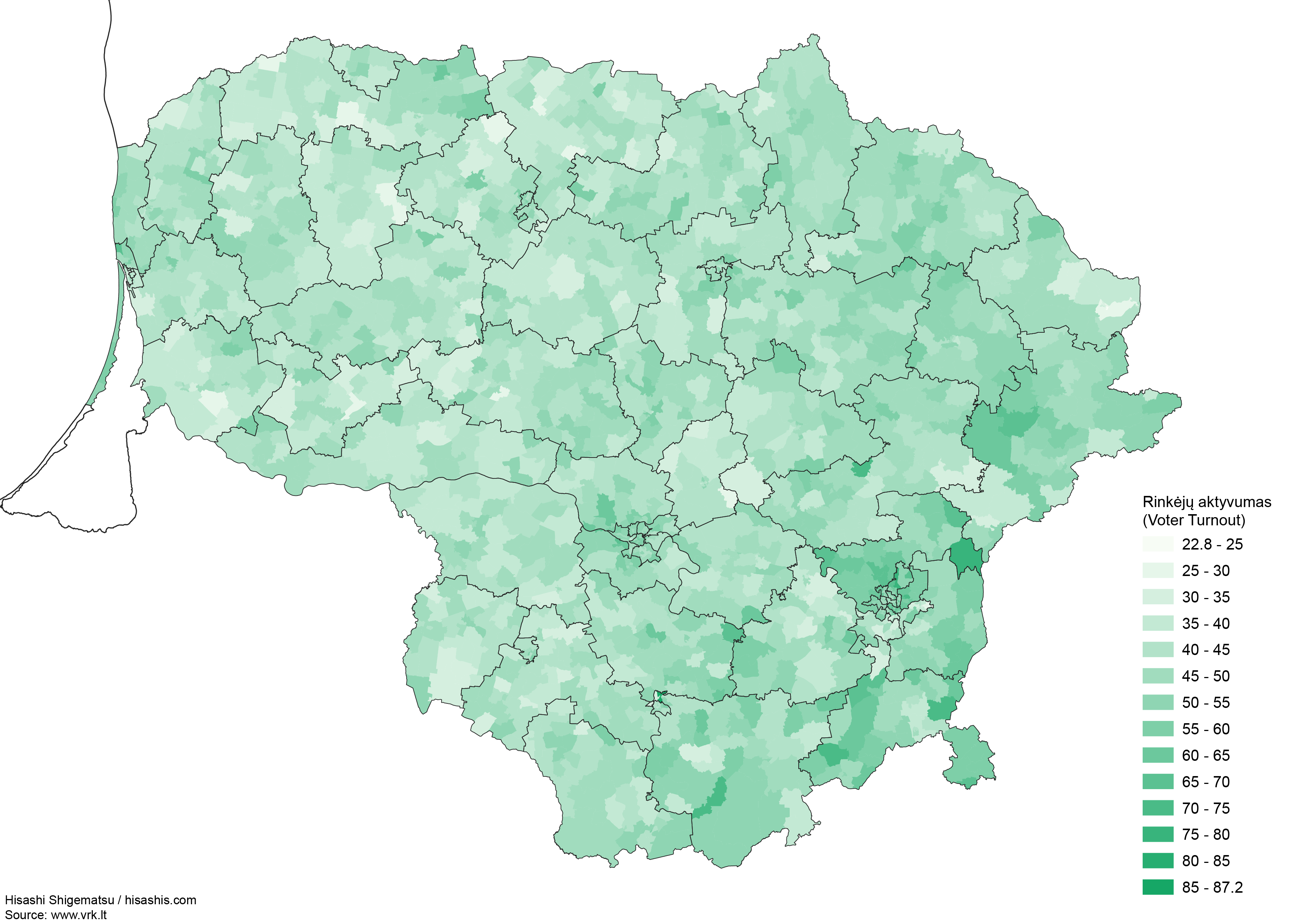
Voter turnout in the first round (by electoral wards)

Single-member constituencies – seats won in the first round

Single-member constituencies – first place after the first round

Single-member constituencies – seats won after the second round

=== Preference votes ===
Alongside votes for a party, voters were able to cast a preferential votes for a candidate on the party list.

Party	Pos.	Candidate	Votes
Homeland Union – Lithuanian Christian Democrats	1	Ingrida Šimonytė	155,814
Homeland Union – Lithuanian Christian Democrats	2	Gabrielius Landsbergis	94,890
Lithuanian Farmers and Greens Union	1	Saulius Skvernelis	80,344
Lithuanian Farmers and Greens Union	2	Ramūnas Karbauskis	66,484
Homeland Union – Lithuanian Christian Democrats	4	Radvilė Morkūnaitė-Mikulėnienė	62,990
Homeland Union – Lithuanian Christian Democrats	7	Agnė Bilotaitė	59,792
Lithuanian Farmers and Greens Union	3	Aurelijus Veryga	56,032
Freedom Party	1	Aušrinė Armonaitė	54,098
Homeland Union – Lithuanian Christian Democrats	3	Laurynas Kasčiūnas	46,403
Social Democratic Party of Lithuania	1	Gintautas Paluckas	38,350

== Analysis ==
The Homeland Union – Lithuanian Christian Democrats once again received a plurality of votes, similar to the prior elections, and achieved much more success in constituency seats, which made up most of its net gain of 19 seats. Overall Homeland Union – Lithuanian Christian Democrats received its largest share of votes and seats since 1996. All parties involved in the pre-election coalition, including the Lithuanian Farmers and Greens Union, Social Democratic Labour Party, and Electoral Action of Poles in Lithuania – Christian Families Alliance, lost seats compared to what they held prior, with the Farmers and Greens losing over 40% of their prior seats.

The Electoral Action of Poles also failed to make the 5% threshold for national list seats for the first time since 2008 (although the party's support was declining ever since 2014 European Parliament election). The Social Democratic Party lost a further four seats, achieving its worst seat result since 1992, and its worst vote result since 1996, while the new Freedom Party saw success, obtaining 11 seats less than two years after its split from the Liberal Movement. The Labour Party saw a rebound at the national level from its disappointing performance in 2016, gaining 8 seats overall and obtaining nearly 10% of the popular vote. Freedom and Justice, which was formed by a merger of Order and Justice (which received 8 seats in the 2016 elections) and the Lithuanian Freedom Union (Liberals), received one constituency seat.

Overall, the Homeland Union – Lithuanian Christian Democrats, the Liberal Movement and the Freedom Party got most support from the cities. For example, both in Vilnius and Kaunas these three parties combined won 52 per cent and 50 per cent of votes respectively.

Turnout was roughly 47% in the first round, and 39% in the second round.

In one of the single-member constituencies (51st Utena) a second round produced an equal number of recorded votes for two candidates: Edmundas Pupinis of the Homeland Union – Lithuanian Christian Democrats, and Gintautas Paluckas of the Social Democratic Party. After a recount, Pupinis was declared the winner with 7,076 votes (Paluckas received 7,071 votes). Despite this, the Social Democratic Party disputed the constituency result as the chairman of the 51st Utena single-member constituency electoral commission turned out to be a staff member of candidate Pupinis. After a recount by the Central Electoral Commission, Pupinis was again declared the winner with 7,078 votes (in this case Gintautas Paluckas received 7,072 votes).

== Aftermath ==
As no party or electoral coalition won a majority of seats (71), a coalition had to be formed. On 15 October, four days after the first round, the leaders of the Homeland Union – Lithuanian Christian Democrats, the Liberal Movement, and the Freedom Party published a joint declaration, which stated that all three parties nominate Ingrida Šimonytė as their joint candidate to be Prime Minister of Lithuania.

On 4 November, a second nationwide lockdown and quarantine began. Unlike during the rest of the year, the official numbers of cases and deaths rose exponentially in November and December (see COVID-19 effects).

On 9 November, a formal coalition agreement between the three aforementioned parties was announced. On 13 November, Viktorija Čmilytė-Nielsen of the Liberal Movement was elected as Speaker of the Seimas. On 24 November, Ingrida Šimonytė was appointed as Prime Minister of Lithuania.
