= Ieva Budraitė =

Lithuanian politician

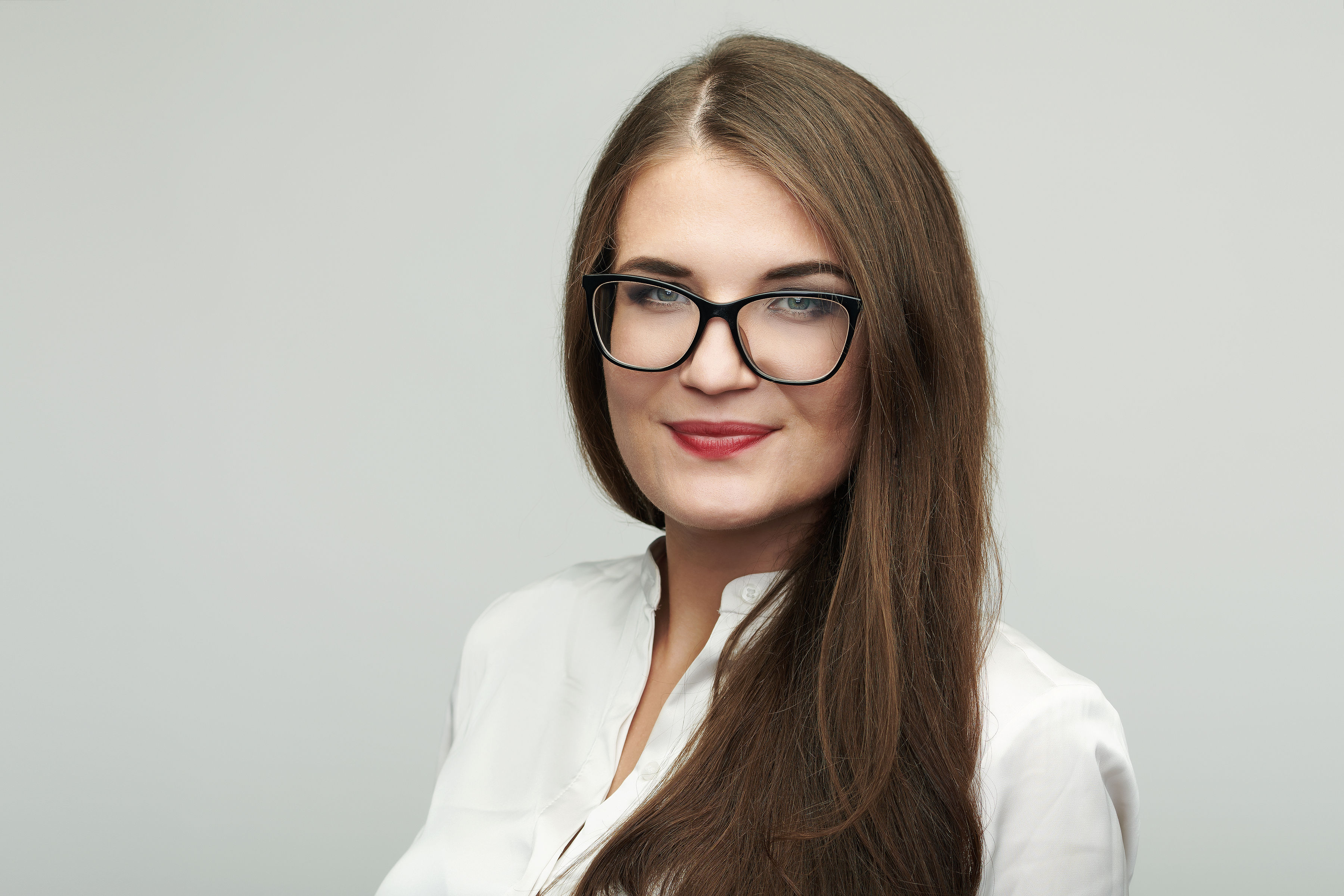

Leader of the Lithuanian Green Party
- Incumbent
- Assumed office November 21, 2020

Director of the Institute for Green Politics
- Incumbent
- Assumed office 2016

Personal details
- Born: 10 January 1992 (age 34) Alytus, Lithuania
- Party: Lithuanian Green Party (2014-present)
- Education: Vilnius University

Ieva Budraitė (born 1992 in Alytus) is a Lithuanian politician and leader of the Lithuanian Green Party, a green-liberal political party.

== Biography ==
After graduating from high school with distinction in 2010 at the Jotvingių Gymnasium Alytus, Ieva Budraitė completed a bachelor's degree in political science from 2010 to 2014 and a master's degree in public policy analysis from 2014 to 2016 at the Institute of International Relations and Political Science of Vilnius University in the Lithuanian capital Vilnius. From 2014 to 2016 she was the project coordinator at the Family Planning and Sexual Health Association. From 2016 to 2020, Budraitė was the director of the Green Policy Institute (Lithuanian: Žaliosios politikos institutas) and was the administrative director of the Lithuanian Green Party. From October 2018 she was the deputy chairwoman of the Green Party.

Budraitė ran in the local elections in 2019 as a candidate for councilor of the municipality of Vilnius, in the European elections in Lithuania in 2019 and in the parliamentary elections in Lithuania in 2020, where she was second in the list.

Since November 21, 2020, she is the chair of the Lithuanian Green Party.
