= LZP =

LZP may refer to:

- Latvian Green Party (Latvijas Zaļā partija), a green political party in Latvia
- Lithuanian Green Party (Lietuvos Žaliųjų Partija), a green-liberal political party in Lithuania
- LZP (compression algorithm), a dictionary-based lossless compression algorithm using a prediction mechanism
