= Dalia Asanavičiūtė =

Lithuanian politician (born 1975)

Member of the Seimas
- Incumbent
- Assumed office 2020

Chairwoman of the Lithuanian Community in the UK
- In office 2014–2020

Personal details
- Born: September 5, 1975 (age 51) Vilnius, Lithuania
- Party: Homeland Union
- Children: 2

Dalia Asanavičiūtė (born 5 September 1975 in Vilnius, Lithuania) is a Lithuanian politician, a member of the Seimas.

== Early life and education ==
Asanavičiūtė graduated from Vilnius Žirmūnai Gymnasium in 1993. In 2003, she got a bachelor's degree from Vilnius Gediminas Technical University.

== Career ==
She was the Chairwoman of the Lithuanian Community in the UK from 2014 to 2020. She was elected to the Seimas in the 2020 Lithuanian parliamentary election and the 2024 Lithuanian parliamentary election. She initiated the 2024 Lithuanian constitutional referendum.

Seimas
Preceded by Aušrinė Armonaitė	Member of the Seimas for Lithuanian diaspora 2024–present	Incumbent
