= Lithuania – For Everyone =

Lithuania – For Everyone Lietuva - visų
- Abbreviation: PLV
- Leader: Tomas Pačėsas
- Founded: January 9, 2012
- Ideology: Lithuanian diaspora interests
- Political position: Centre

Website
- http://www.lietuva-visu.com

Lithuania – For Everyone (Lithuanian: Lietuva – visų), known as the Emigrant Party (Lithuanian: Emigrantų partija) before 2020, is a minor political party in Lithuania which represents the interests of the Lithuanian diaspora.

== History ==
The party was founded as the Emigrant Party on 9 January 2012 in Kaunas. Its first chairman was Juozas Murauskas, a Lithuanian car rental businessman who returned to Lithuania from Chicago and cited poor business opportunities for returning Lithuanian emigrants as the reason for the party's existence.

It vowed to legalize multiple citizenship in Lithuania and improve conditions for business by reducing business taxation. It also vowed to establish a "Ministry of National Survival" which would be tasked with preventing emigration and suicides in Lithuania. In the 2012 parliamentary election it received only 0.29 percent of the proportional vote. In spite of its alignment with the Lithuanian diaspora, less than 10 percent of the party's votes came from emigrant votes in Lithuania's diplomatic missions.

The party intended to participate in the 2015 municipal elections in Kaunas, but withdrew from the race after its chairman was revealed to have failed to inform the Election Commission of his criminal record. The party did not participate in the 2016 parliamentary elections nor 2019 municipal elections.

In January 2020, after several years of inactivity, the party changed its name to Lithuania – For Everyone and elected former professional basketball player Tomas Pačėsas as its new chairman. The party changed its program and declared itself to be in favor of socially progressive economics, such as progressive taxation and reducing social exclusion. It expressed scepticism towards restrictions during the COVID-19 pandemic in Lithuania, and the party's chairman criticized high fines for not wearing face masks.

In the 2020 parliamentary election, it received 0.97 percent of the vote, and did not win any seats. The party's chairman Tomas Pačėsas received 4.47 percent of the vote in the Lithuanians Worldwide constituency, established to represent the Lithuanian diaspora.

The party intended to participate in the 2023 municipal elections, but withdrew from the race on its own accord on 2 January 2023.

== Ideology ==
The party's initial goals were to legalize multiple citizenship and electronic voting in Lithuania, as well as to improve conditions for business with tax reductions. After its reorganization to its current name, it also vowed to establish a social market economy in Lithuania and introduce progressive taxation, and it also criticized restrictions during the COVID-19 pandemic.

== Election results ==
=== Seimas ===
Election	Votes (Note: Proportional representation votes.)	%	Seats	+/–	Government
2012	4,015	0.31 (#16)	0 / 141	0	Opposition
2020	11,352	0.97 (#14)	0 / 141	0	Opposition
