= 2003 Lithuanian European Union membership referendum =

10–11 May 2003
- I am for Lithuania's membership of the European Union.

Results
Choice	Votes	%
Yes	1,504,264	91.07%
No	147,527	8.93%
Valid votes	1,651,791	98.77%
Invalid or blank votes	20,526	1.23%
Total votes	1,672,317	100.00%
Registered voters/turnout	2,638,886	63.37%

The 2003 Lithuanian European Union referendum took place from 10 May to 11 May 2003 to decide whether Lithuania should join the European Union (EU). Over 90% of those who voted supported membership and Lithuania joined the EU on 1 May 2004.

== Background ==
Lithuania was invited to begin negotiations to join the EU in December 1999 at a European Council summit in Helsinki and was formally invited to join the EU in December 2002 at a summit in Copenhagen.

In June 2002 and February 2003 the Lithuanian Parliament amended Lithuania's laws on referendums. Previously, for a referendum to pass, 50% of the voters had to vote and over 50% of all eligible registered voters had to support the proposal. After the amendment only a simple majority of participants in favour was required for the referendum to pass, while still having the requirement for turnout to be over 50%. To help reach the turnout requirement, the voting hours were extended, postal voting was allowed for 11 days before the referendum, and a second voting day was added. In January 2003 parliament then set the date for EU referendum to be the 10–11 May and set the question for the vote.

== Referendum question ==
Lithuanian voters were asked to vote yes or no to the statement:

I am for Lithuania's membership of the European Union.

== Campaign ==
An information campaign on the European Union was begun in 2000 and involved the Elderships of Lithuania and the Catholic Church. Opinion polls, which at the end of 1999 had only 29% supporters of the EU, showed a steady rise in support in the years leading up to the referendum.

Virtually all of Lithuania's major political parties supported membership of the EU and opinion polls as the date approached showed about 65% of voters would vote yes. The President of Lithuania Rolandas Paksas, who once competed in aerobatics competitions, flew around Lithuania in his plane performing stunts to raise enthusiasm. The campaign was very one-sided with only a poorly organised No campaign based on milk producers, Russian speakers and right wing nationalists.

== Turnout ==
The biggest concern for the yes campaign was whether turnout would reach the 50% required for the referendum to be valid. After the first day of voting turnout was only 30% and both the President Paksas and Prime Minister Algirdas Mykolas Brazauskas appeared on TV to urge Lithuanians to vote. Main reason for worry was that turnout might be as low as in Hungary just a month ago.

There was a surge in voting on the Sunday with many people voting after church services. Lithuanian supermarkets also had a campaign on the second day of voting, offering cheaper beer, carbonated soft drink, chocolate and soap to those who showed they had voted. In the end there were queues outside some voting booths and turnout was over 60%, safely over the required level.

== Results ==
Choice	Votes	%
For	1,504,264	91.07
Against	147,527	8.93
Total	1,651,791	100.00
Valid votes	1,651,791	98.77
Invalid/blank votes	20,526	1.23
Total votes	1,672,317	100.00
Registered voters/turnout	2,638,886	63.37
Source: Nohlen & Stöver

Celebrations were held in Lithuania's capital Vilnius following the referendum. A concert was held near the Presidential palace, President Paksas addressed the crowd saying "Hello Europeans!" and the Prime Minister Algirdas Brazauskas and parliamentary speaker Artūras Paulauskas cut a referendum cake. The European Commission President Romano Prodi congratulated Lithuania on the referendum result.

== See also ==
- Referendums in Lithuania
