= Remigijus Lapinskas =

Lithuanian business entrepreneur and politician

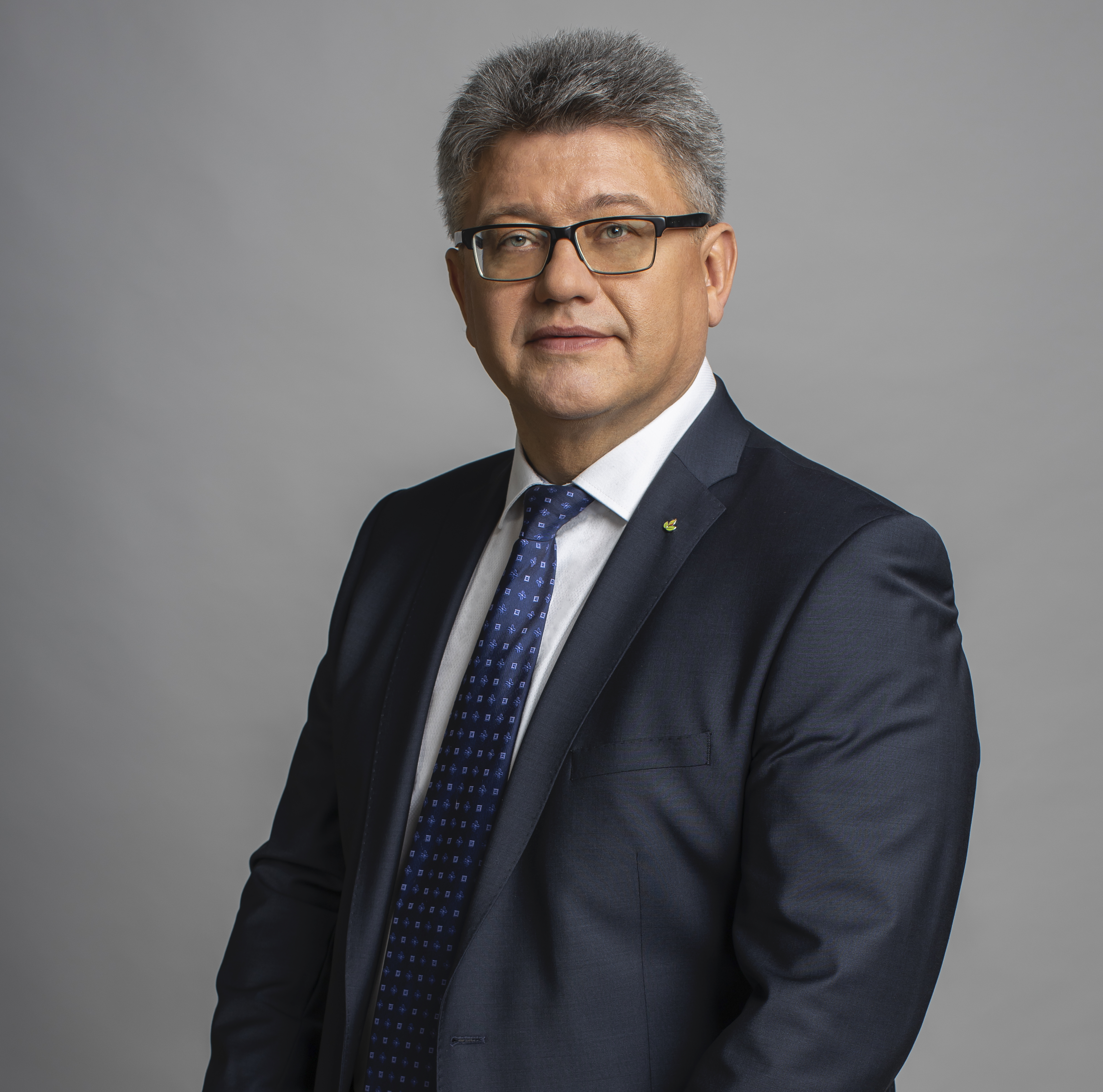

Leader of Lithuanian Green Party
- In office 2016–2020

President of World Bioenergy Association
- In office 2016–2020

President of LITBIOMA
- In office 2009–2020

Personal details
- Born: 29 January 1968 (age 58) Jonava, Kaunas District Lithuania
- Party: Lithuanian Green Party (2011-present)
- Spouse: Dalia Lapinskienė
- Children: 2
- Education: Vilnius University

Remigijus Lapinskas (born 1968 in Jonava) is a Lithuanian business entrepreneur and leader of Lithuanian Green Party, a green-liberal political party.

== Biography ==
Remigijus Lapinskas graduated in 1986 from Garliava high school. Then he studied at Vilnius University. In 1993, he graduated from the Law Faculty. His first business experience was together with his friends (Andrius Janukonis etc.) from University, co-founded the company Rubicon, the basis of today's UAB ICOR. He began intensive commercial activities, the business grew to become one of the leading enterprises of Lithuania.

From 2016 to 2020, Lapinskas was president of World Bioenergy Association.

Remigijus Lapinskas is a president of the Green Policy Institute. He was the founder and president (2004–2014) of Lithuanian biomass energy association LITBIOMA, board member in European Biomass Association (AEBIOM) from 2006 to 2010.
