= 1996 Lithuanian referendum =

A four-part referendum was held in Lithuania on 20 October 1996 alongside the first round of parliamentary elections. Voters were asked whether they approved of three amendments to the constitution and whether money from the sale of state property should be used to compensate those who lost their Soviet-era savings due to inflation. The three constitutional amendments would reduce the number of members of the Seimas, fix the date for elections to be in the spring, and to reserve at least 50% of government expenditure to social spending.

Although all four were approved by at least 76% of those casting valid votes, voter turnout was only 52-53%, meaning that the threshold of 50% of all registered voters voting in favour was not passed, and the referendums failed.

== Results ==
=== Constitutional amendment on reducing the number of members of the Seimas ===
| Choice | Votes | % |
|---|---|---|
| For | 879,727 | 77.9 |
| Against | 238,635 | 21.1 |
| Invalid/blank votes | 224,691 | – |
| Total | 1,353,448 | 100 |
| Registered voters/turnout | 2,597,530 | 52.1 |
Source: Nohlen & Stöver

=== Constitutional amendment on fixing the election date in spring ===
| Choice | Votes | % |
|---|---|---|
| For | 860,465 | 76.2 |
| Against | 252,916 | 22.4 |
| Invalid/blank votes | 224,691 | – |
| Total | 1,353,448 | 100 |
| Registered voters/turnout | 2,597,530 | 52.1 |
Source: Nohlen & Stöver

=== Constitutional amendment on social spending ===
| Choice | Votes | % |
|---|---|---|
| For | 858,670 | 76.1 |
| Against | 257,303 | 22.8 |
| Invalid/blank votes | 224,691 | – |
| Total | 1,353,448 | 100 |
| Registered voters/turnout | 2,597,530 | 52.1 |
Source: Nohlen & Stöver

=== Using the proceeds of privatisation to compensate savers ===
| Choice | Votes | % |
|---|---|---|
| For | 1,012,497 | 79.5 |
| Against | 260,207 | 20.5 |
| Invalid/blank votes | 89,630 | – |
| Total | 1,362,573 | 100 |
| Registered voters/turnout | 2,597,530 | 52.5 |
Source: Nohlen & Stöver
