= 1992 Lithuanian presidency referendum =

23 May 1992
- Outcome: Proposal failed as fewer than 50% of registered voters voted in favour

Results
Choice	Votes	%
Yes	1,057,033	73.04%
No	390,254	26.96%
Valid votes	1,447,287	94.84%
Invalid or blank votes	78,698	5.16%
Total votes	1,525,985	100.00%
Registered voters/turnout	2,578,711	59.18%

A referendum on the presidency was held in Lithuania on 23 May 1992. Voters were asked whether they approved of restoring the institution of the presidency. It was initiated by Sąjūdis.

Although it was approved by 73% of those voting, the turnout of 59% meant that the number of registered voters approving the proposal was only 41%. As this was below the 50% threshold, the proposal failed.

== Background ==
The Supreme Soviet of the Lithuanian SSR, its parliament, declared Lithuania's independence from the Soviet Union on 11 March 1990. On the same day, it adopted a provisional constitution – the Provisional Basic Law. The law established a framework for the new state, guaranteeing democratic rights and establishing rules of democratic process. However, the government was structured similarly to its Soviet predecessor: legislative and executive functions were combined under the parliament (Supreme Council, Lithuanian: Aukščiausioji Taryba), and the judiciary branch was not independent. The government functions were performed by the presidium of the Supreme Council and the chairman of the presidium became the chairman of the parliament and the Head of State.

The Soviet model proved not to be suitable for the new democratic system of government. The Basic Law did not reflect the changing economic and social relations and the evolving demands of the society and the state. Also over one-third of the Law was amended in a period of two years.

Over the next two years work on a new constitution was done, with independent drafts prepared in 1990 and 1991. At the end of 1991 the Supreme Council established a commission tasked with preparing a draft constitution. The resulting proposal was approved by the Supreme Council on 21 April 1992 and presented to the public. An alternative draft constitution was prepared by a coalition led by Sąjūdis. The main difference between the two proposals was the balance of power between the various branches of government. The proposal approved by the Supreme Council envisioned a parliamentary system, while the alternative proposal suggested a presidential model. The latter model was supported by Sąjūdis and the more radical parties, including the Independence Party, Lithuanian Democratic Party and Citizens Charter.

After the collection of more than 300,000 signatures to hold a referendum and a verification process throughout February and March, the Supreme Council passed the law that set the referendum day as 23 May 1992.

== Results ==
Choice	Votes	%
For	1,057,033	73.04
Against	390,254	26.96
Total	1,447,287	100.00
Valid votes	1,447,287	94.84
Invalid/blank votes	78,698	5.16
Total votes	1,525,985	100.00
Registered voters/turnout	2,578,711	59.18
Source: Nohlen & Stöver

The most supportive of presidency district was Kaunas (81.61 per cent of all votes). The least supportive of presidency district (and the only where "No" votes were majority) was Pakruojis.
