= Tomas Pačėsas =

Lithuanian basketball player

- Pačėsas in 2026

Personal information
- Born: November 11, 1971 (age 55) Alytus, Lithuanian SSR, Soviet Union
- Listed height: 6 ft 3 in (1.91 m)
- Listed weight: 187 lb (85 kg)

Career information
- Playing career: 1994–2007
- Position: Point guard
- Number: 7, 15
- Coaching career: 2007–present

Career history

Playing
- 1993–1995: Lavera Kaunas
- 1995–1996: Atletas Kaunas
- 1996–1997: BC Alita
- 1997–1998: BIPA-Moda
- 1998: Atletas Kaunas
- 1998–1999: Maccabi Rishon LeZion
- 1999–2001: Ural Great Perm
- 2001: Legia Warsaw
- 2001–2002: Śląsk Wrocław
- 2002–2003: Anwil Włocławek
- 2003–2007: Asseco Prokom

Coaching
- 2007: Asseco Prokom (assistant)
- 2007–2012: Asseco Prokom
- 2015–2017: Lietuvos rytas Vilnius
- 2024–2026: Lithuania (assistant)

Career highlights
- As player: Russian Championship champion (2001); Russian Super League All-Star (2000); 6× Polish League champion (2002–2007); Polish League MVP (2004); Polish League Finals MVP (2004); Polish Cup winner (2006); North European League champion (2001); As head coach: Lithuanian King Mindaugas Cup winner (2016); 4× Polish League champion (2008–2011); Polish Cup winner (2008); Polish Supercup (2010)
Medals
Men's basketball
Representing Lithuania
Olympics
Bronze medal – third place	1996 Atlanta

Tomas Pačėsas (born November 11, 1971) is a Lithuanian former professional basketball player, basketball coach, businessman, and politician (chairman of Lithuania – For Everyone).

== Playing career ==
=== Club career ===
Pačėsas was the Polish League MVP, in 2004.

=== Lithuanian senior national team ===
Pačėsas was a member of the senior Lithuanian national team that won bronze medals at the 1996 Summer Olympic Games.

== Coaching career ==
In December 2015, Pačėsas signed on as the head coach of Lietuvos rytas. He helped Rytas win the King Mindaugas Cup, but only managed a 3rd-place finish in the LKL after losing to Neptūnas in the semifinals. In June 2016, he extended his contract for one more year. The 2016–2017 season was even worse however, as the team struggled in the LKL and failed to qualify to the EuroCup playoffs. In February 2017, Pačėsas resigned, and left Lietuvos rytas.

== Career statistics ==
Legend
GP	Games played	GS	Games started	MPG	Minutes per game
FG%	Field-goal percentage	3P%	3-point field-goal percentage	FT%	Free-throw percentage
RPG	Rebounds per game	APG	Assists per game	SPG	Steals per game
BPG	Blocks per game	PPG	Points per game	PIR	Performance index rating
**Bold**	Career high

=== EuroLeague ===
Year	Team	GP	GS	MPG	FG%	3P%	FT%	RPG	APG	SPG	BPG	PPG	PIR
2001–02	Śląsk Wrocław	5	0	15.3	.384	.714	.000	1.2	1.4	.2	.0	3.0	2.0
2004–05	Asseco Prokom	19	19	30.2	.283	.215	.444	2.8	4.1	1.8	.1	4.9	5.5
2005–06	Asseco Prokom	13	11	28.1	.426	.400	.667	2.5	2.8	1.2	.0	6.2	7.2
2006–07	Asseco Prokom	7	0	10.2	.250	.286	.000	.4	1.0	.3	.0	.9	.1
Career		44	30	24.8	.331	.308	.533	2.2	2.9	1.2	.0	4.4	4.8

=== EuroCup ===
Year	Team	GP	GS	MPG	FG%	3P%	FT%	RPG	APG	SPG	BPG	PPG	PIR
2003–04	Asseco Prokom	12	11	26.4	.488	.490	1.000	2.8	4.3	1.2	.0	10.4	12.3

== Awards and accomplishments ==
=== Pro career ===
- North European League Champion: (2001)
- Russian Championship Champion: (2001)
- 6× Polish League Champion: (2002, 2003, 2004, 2005, 2006, 2007)

=== Lithuanian senior national team ===
- 1996 Summer Olympic Games: Bronze

== Coaching record ==
Legend
G	Games coached	W	Games won	L	Games lost	W–L %	Win-loss %

Note: The EuroLeague is not the only competition in which the team played during the season. He also coached in domestic competition, and regional competition if applicable.

=== EuroLeague ===
Team	Year	G	W	L	W–L%	Result
Asseco Prokom	2007–08	8	3	5	.375	Eliminated in group stage
Asseco Prokom	2008–09	16	3	13	.188	Eliminated in TOP-16
Asseco Prokom	2009–10	20	8	12	.400	Eliminated in quarterfinals
Asseco Prokom	2010–11	10	2	8	.200	Eliminated in group stage
Asseco Prokom	2011–12	10	1	9	.100	Eliminated in group stage
Career		64	17	47	.266	
