= 1992 Lithuanian Soviet withdrawal referendum =

14 June 1992
- Unconditional and immediate withdrawal of the troops of the former USSR, which today belong to the Russian Federation, from the Republic of Lithuania by the end of 1992 and payment of the damage caused.

Results
Choice	Votes	%
Yes	1,751,026	92.59%
No	140,077	7.41%
Valid votes	1,891,103	97.92%
Invalid or blank votes	40,175	2.08%
Total votes	1,931,278	100.00%
Registered voters/turnout	2,539,433	76.05%

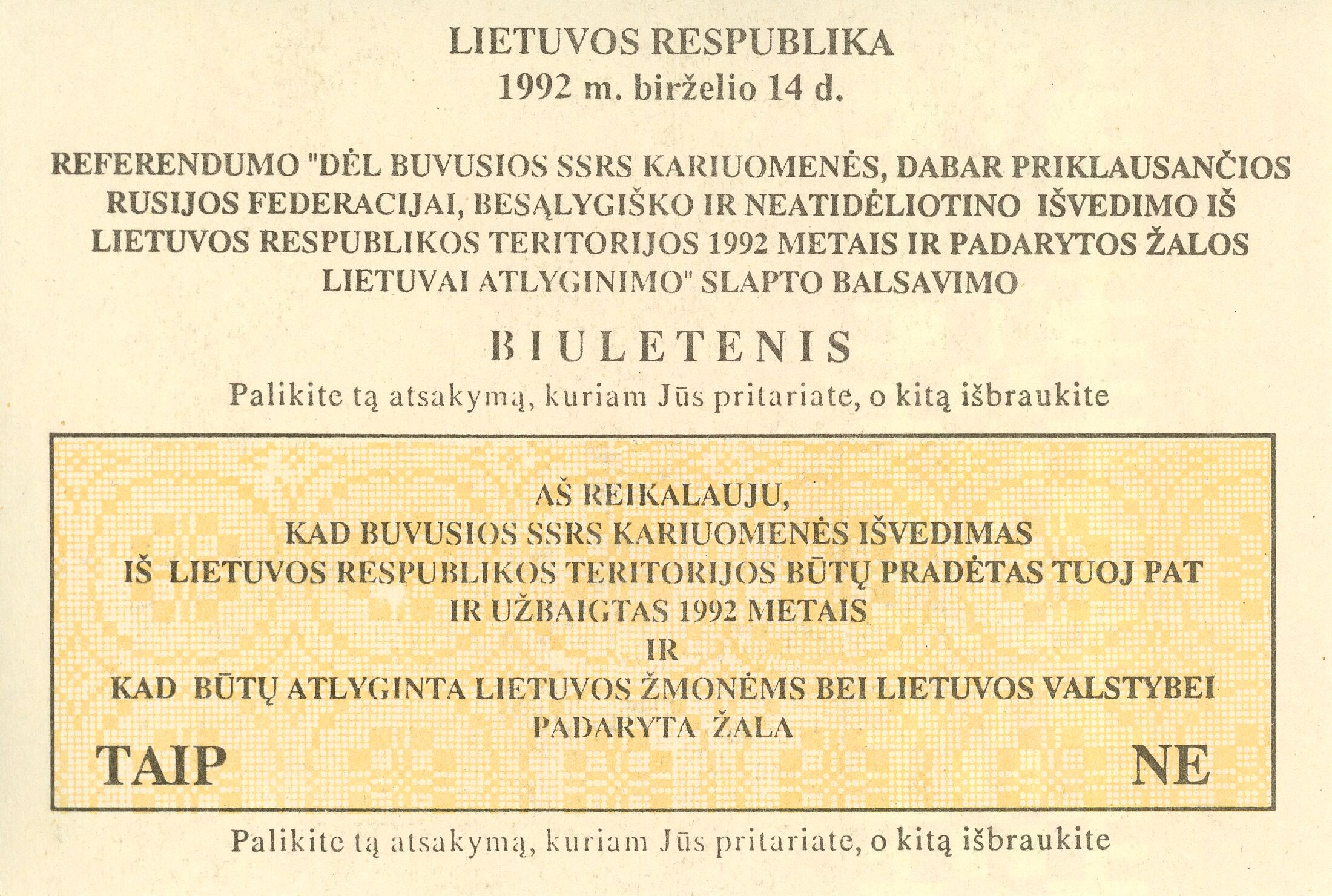
Ballot paper

A referendum on the withdrawal of Soviet troops was held in Lithuania on 14 June 1992. Voters were asked whether Soviet troops (which by the time of the referendum had become Russian troops) should unconditionally and immediately withdraw from the country. It was approved by 93% of those voting and 69% of all registered voters, passing the 50% threshold.

== Results ==
Choice	Votes	%
For	1,751,026	92.59
Against	140,077	7.41
Total	1,891,103	100.00
Valid votes	1,891,103	97.92
Invalid/blank votes	40,175	2.08
Total votes	1,931,278	100.00
Registered voters/turnout	2,539,433	76.05
Source: Nohlen & Stöver
