= 1994 Lithuanian privatisation referendum =

27 August 1994
- Outcome: Proposal failed as less than 50% of registered voters voted in favour

A referendum on a law revoking privatisation deals was held in Lithuania on 27 August 1994. The proposed law put forward procedures for reversing privatisation deals conducted in a non-transparent manner, as well as compensating citizens for the loss of savings caused by inflation. A total of eight questions were asked, and although around 89% voted in favour of all of them, the voter turnout of 40% meant that the threshold of 50% of registered voters voting in favour was not passed, resulting in the proposal failing.

== Results ==
Question	For		Against		Invalid/ blank	Total votes	Registered voters	Turnout	Outcome
Question	Votes	%	Votes	%	Invalid/ blank	Total votes	Registered voters	Turnout	Outcome
Enactment of a law on privatisations	749,172	89.00	92,593	11.00	54,014	895,778	2,428,105	36.89	Quota not reached
Repeal of illegal privatisations	748,866	88.96	92,900	11.04	54,014	895,778	2,428,105	36.89	Quota not reached
Elimination of the consequences of privatisations	747,624	88.74	94,900	11.26	54,014	895,778	2,428,105	36.89	Quota not reached
Restoration/compensation for devalued private bank accounts	749,847	89.08	91,917	10.92	54,014	895,778	2,428,105	36.89	Quota not reached
Indexation of the value of long-term investments	748,171	88.88	93,592	11.12	54,014	895,778	2,428,105	36.89	Quota not reached
Restoration of devalued state-owned share capital	747,755	88.83	94,008	11.17	54,014	895,778	2,428,105	36.89	Quota not reached
Standardisation and openness in legal protection	751,955	89.33	89,811	10.67	54,014	895,778	2,428,105	36.89	Quota not reached
Implementation of the law on privatisations	749,356	89.02	92,409	10.98	54,014	895,778	2,428,105	36.89	Quota not reached
Source: Direct Democracy
