= Lithuanian Green Party =

Lithuanian political party

Lithuanian Green Party Lietuvos žaliųjų partija
- Leader: Ieva Budraitė
- Founded: 20 March 2011
- Headquarters: Šermukšnių g. 6A, Vilnius
- Membership: 2,304 (2024)
- Ideology: Green liberalism Pro-Europeanism
- Political position: Centre to centre-left
- Colours: Green
- Seimas: 0 / 141
- European Parliament: 0 / 11
- Municipal councils: 14 / 1,498
- Mayors: 0 / 60

Website
- www.lzp.lt

The Lithuanian Green Party (Lithuanian: Lietuvos žaliųjų partija, LŽP) is a green-liberal political party in Lithuania. It was founded in 2011. The party's chairwoman is environmental activist Ieva Budraitė.

== History ==
=== Foundation ===
Until 2011, Lithuania was the last member state of the European Union without a green party. The first summit of environmental activists with the intention of establishing an environmentalist party was held on 7 October 2009, organized by biologist and employee of the Ministry of Environment Juozas Dautartas. Though the party intended to compete in the 2011 municipal elections, it was not founded in time. On 20 March 2011, a founding conference established the Lithuanian Green Movement (Lithuanian: Lietuvos žaliųjų sąjūdis). It was renamed to the Lithuanian Green Party in 2012.

The impetus for the party's formation came in ongoing discussion over the fate of the Ignalina Nuclear Power Plant. The party opposed projects to replace it with the planned Visaginas Nuclear Power Plant and demanded a referendum alongside the Lithuanian Farmers and Greens Union. In 2012, a referendum was held on the construction of the plant, in which the proposal was defeated. Though the referendum was consultative, the Visaginas nuclear plant project was subsequently abandoned.

=== Activity ===
In the 2012 parliamentary election, it chose to run as a part of the Farmer-Green electoral list - the election was unsuccessful, however, Linas Balsys ran as an independent and won a seat. He was elected as the party's new chairman.

It has contested every national election since. Its most successful showing was in the 2014 European Parliament election in Lithuania, in which it received 3.56% of the vote. It also frequently holds protests against pollution, violations of animal rights and for climate change awareness.

In spite of its modest showings, it has earned headlines as a "place of exile" for politicians in Lithuania. Saulius Skvernelis entered discussions on joining the Green Party before choosing to establish the Union of Democrats "For Lithuania" instead. In the 2020 parliamentary election, the party was joined by former Prime Minister Algirdas Butkevičius, formerly a member of the Social Democratic Party. He won a seat in Vilkaviškis. In 2022, he joined the Union of Democrats, depriving the Green Party of its seat in the Seimas.

The party's current chairman, Ieva Budraitė, was elected in November 2020. She is the youngest party leader in Lithuania. Since the election of Ieva Budraitė as chairman, the party shifted more clearly towards the political left-wing. It shares ties with the political left-leaning organizations such as KArtu (Kairiųjų Aljansas) as the party leader had once attended the founding meeting of the organization as well as several public rallies in support of Palestine in the Israeli-Palestinian conflict with other KArtu members. The Lithuanian Green Party also started common political work with the Freedom Party, declaring about their preparations for the 2027 Lithuanian municipal elections by putting forward a joint list of candidates from both parties as well as declaring about the candidacy of Ieva Budraitė for the position of mayor in the Kaunas City Municipality.

The party's list in the 2024 European Parliament election was the first in the country's history to only include female candidates. According to Budraitė, this was done to shed light on gender inequality and encourage female participation in politics.

== Ideology ==
The Lithuanian Green Party holds progressive and environmentalist positions. It supports participatory democracy, transition to renewable energy and the circular economy, and animal rights. During the electoral campaign for the 2020 parliamentary election, it vowed to achieve net zero emissions by 2040, encourage companies to switch to the four-day work week through tax rebates, abolish VAT for electric vehicles, and raise the monthly minimum wage to 1,000 EUR.

It supports membership in the European Union and NATO, and fulfilling NATO's 2% military expenditure criteria. It endorses same-sex partnerships and legalizing dual citizenship in Lithuania.

== Election results ==
=== Seimas ===
Election	Leader	Votes (Note: Proportional representation votes.)	%	Seats	+/–	Government
2016	Linas Balsys	24,727	2.03 (#9)	1 / 141	New	Opposition
2020	Algirdas Butkevičius	19,303	1.7 (#10)	1 / 141	0	Opposition (2020−2021)
2020	Algirdas Butkevičius	19,303	1.7 (#10)	1 / 141	0	Extra-parliamentary (2021−2024)
2024	Ieva Budraitė	21,002	1.68 (#13)	0 / 141	▼1	Extra-parliamentary

=== European Parliament ===
Election	List leader	Votes	%	Seats	+/–	EP Group
2014	Linas Balsys	40,696	3.56 (#8)	0 / 11	New	–
2019	Remigijus Lapinskas	28,562	2.27 (#13)	0 / 11	0	–
2024	Ieva Budraitė	27,431	4.05 (#10)	0 / 11	0	–

=== Municipal ===
Election	Votes (Note: Municipal council election votes.)	%	Council seats	Mayors	+/–
2015	5,068	0.46 (#15)	0 / 1,416	0 / 60	-
2019	7,472	0.66 (#11)	5 / 1,442	0 / 60	▲5
2023	19,386	1.72 (#11)	12 / 1,498	0 / 60	▲7

== Leaders ==
- 2011–2012: Juozas Dautartas (b. 1959)
- 2012: Albinas Morkūnas (b. 1944)
- 2012–2016: Linas Balsys (b. 1961)
- 2016–2020: Remigijus Lapinskas (b. 1968)
- 2020–current: Ieva Budraitė (b. 1992)

== See also ==
- Green party
- Green politics
- List of environmental organizations
- Politics of Lithuania
