= 2019 Lithuanian constitutional referendum =

12 May 2019
- Outcome: Both measures rejected due to low turnout.

Amendment of Article 55 of the Constitution to reduce the number of seats in the Seimas from 141 to 121
Yes	76.19%
No	23.81%
Invalid ballots	3.18%

Amendment of Article 12 of the Constitution to allow Lithuanians to hold dual citizenship
Yes	73.92%
No	26.08%
Invalid ballots	2.12%

A constitutional referendum was held in Lithuania on 12 May 2019, alongside the first round of the presidential elections. Two proposals were put to voters – one to reduce the number of MPs in the Seimas from 141 to 121 and one to allow Lithuanians to hold dual citizenship with a list of countries meeting "European or transatlantic integration criteria," which would be determined by law. In order for the first constitutional amendment to be passed, voter turnout was required to be above 50%, and at least 33.3% of registered voters would have to vote in favour of the proposal. For the second amendment, at least 50% of registered voters would have to vote in favour of the proposal.

Despite 76% of those who voted voting in favour (equalling 35.3% of registered voters), the proposal to reduce the number of MPs failed as voter turnout (at 47%) was below the 50% threshold. The proposal on dual citizenship had a turnout of over 50% and was approved by 73% of those voting, but this amounted to only 38% of eligible voters.

== Background ==
The proposal to allow dual citizenship was approved by a vote in the Seimas in October, and would involve amending article 12 of the constitution. In a draft constitutional law that sat alongside the proposal, this would be limited to member countries of the European Union, European Economic Area, NATO and the OECD and explicitly prohibit dual citizenship with countries involved in organisations based around the former Soviet Union, including the Commonwealth of Independent States, Collective Security Treaty Organization and Eurasian Economic Union.

The proposal to reduce the number of MPs was suggested by the Lithuanian Farmers and Greens Union. Although it was initially rejected by the Seimas, it was approved in another vote on 14 February by a vote of 58–42.

An amendment to the Law on Referendums approved by the Seimas in December 2018 allowed polling places to be set up in foreign countries.

== Results ==
Question	For		Against		Invalid/ blank	Total votes	Registered voters	Turnout	Result
Question	Votes	%	Votes	%	Invalid/ blank	Total votes	Registered voters	Turnout	Result
Reducing the number of MPs	876,841	76.19	274,091	23.81	37,802	1,188,734	2,486,915	47.80	Failed
Allowing dual citizenship with certain countries	956,564	73.92	337,504	26.08	28,067	1,322,135	2,486,915	53.16	Failed
Source: VRK, VRK

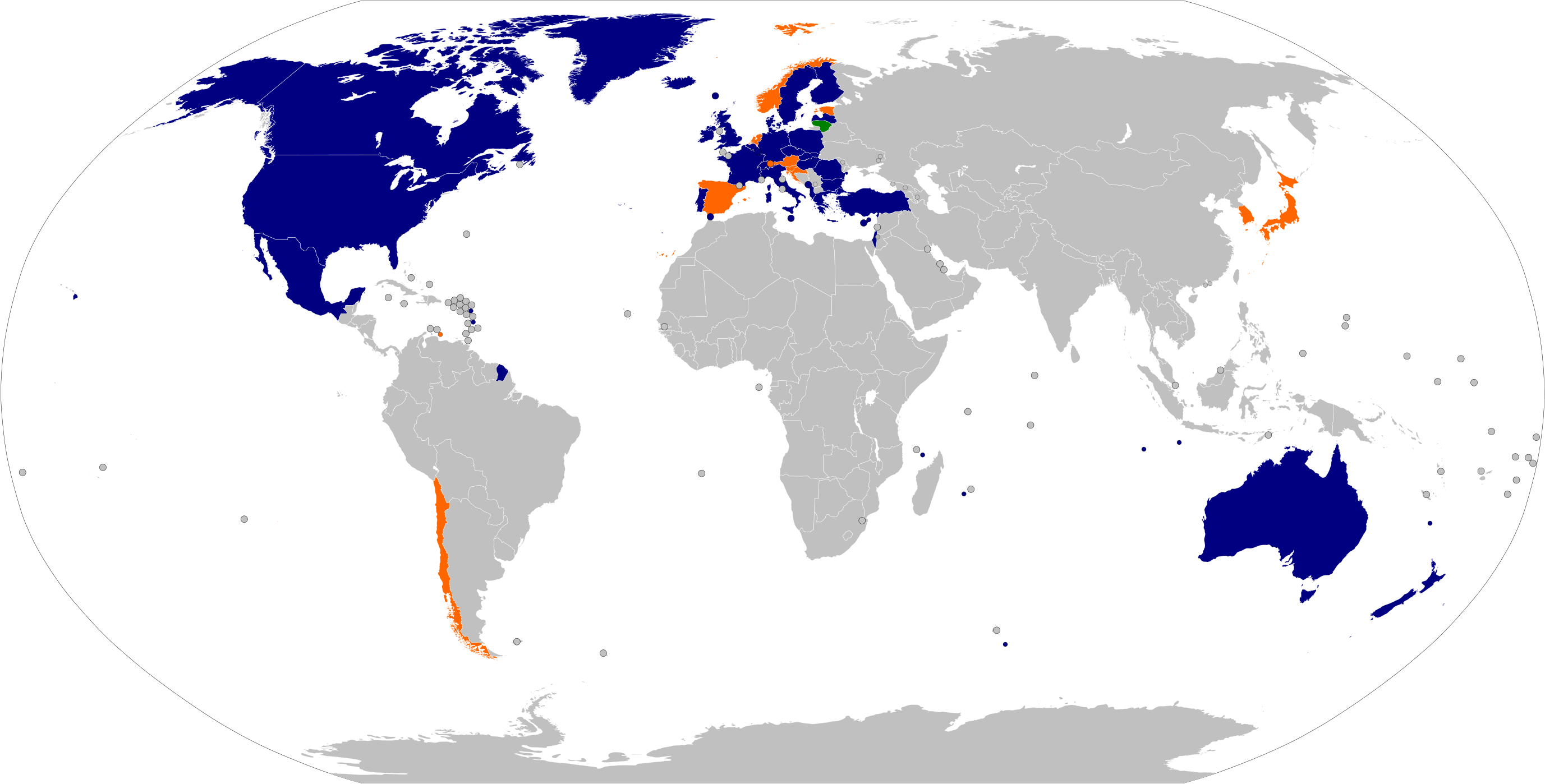
Green - Lithuania Blue - countries with which dual citizenship would be allowed under a draft law. Orange - countries which would meet the criteria in the draft law, but wouldn't allow dual citizenship with Lithuania under their own national law. Grey - countries that wouldn't meet the criteria.
