= Baltic Farm =

First and only season of The Farm to air in the Baltic region of Europe

- Season 1
- Presented by: Marko Matvere; Artūrs Skrastiņš; Kęstutis Jakštas
- No. of days: 50
- No. of castaways: 19
- Winner: Una Jēkabsone
- Runners-up: Nerijus Cesiulis; Kalle Talvi
- Location: Malvaste, Hiiumaa, Estonia
- No. of episodes: 50

Release
- Original network: TV3 Estonia; TV3 Latvia; TV3 Lithuania
- Original release: February 4 – April 27, 2003

Baltic Farm, known as Farmi in Estonia, Ferma in Latvia and Fermos in Lithuania was the first and only season of The Farm to air in the Baltic region of Europe. 19 contestants compete and live on a Farm like it was a century prior and to try and survive to win the grand prize of €10,000. The series was filmed on the premises of the Mihkli farm museum in Malvaste, Estonia where the series was hosted by Marko Matvere representing Estonia, Artūrs Skrastiņš hosting for Latvia and Kęstutis Jakštas hosting for Lithuania. The series premiered on 4 February 2003 and concluded on 27 April 2003 where Latvian Una Jēkabsone won in the final challenge against Lithuanian Nerijus Cesiulis and Estonian Kalle Talvi to win the grand prize and be crowned the winner of Baltic Farm.

== Contestants ==
Contestant	Age on entry	Residence	Country	Entered	Exited	Status	Finish
Marisa Jõe	32	Tallinn	Estonia	Day 1	Day 5	1st Evicted; Day 5	19th
Žaneta Krasiļņikova	21	Vilnius	Lithuania	Day 1	Day 5	2nd Evicted; Day 5	18th
Ilona Salma	31	Kandava	Latvia	Day 1	Day 5	3rd Evicted; Day 5	17th
Gabriels Kubjas	31	Tallinn	Estonia	Day 1	Day 6	Ejected; Day 6	16th
Židrūns Mockaitis	30	Grinkiškis	Lithuania	Day 1	Day 10	4th Evicted; Day 10	15th
Gojko Gorskis	28	Alūksne	Latvia	Day 1	Day 15	5th Evicted; Day 15	14th
Madis Brjantsev	21	Tallinn	Estonia	Day 1	Day 20	6th Evicted; Day 20	13th
Liene Šadrovika	47	Jelgava	Latvia	Day 1	Day 25	7th Evicted; Day 25	12th
Andrus Balezentis	19	Vilnius	Lithuania	Day 1	Day 30	8th Evicted; Day 30	11th
Māris Eņģelis	43	Mārupe	Latvia	Day 1	Day 35	9th Evicted; Day 35	10th
Eve Suvari	33	Tartu	Estonia	Day 32	Day 40	10th Evicted; Day 40	9th
Guntis Erbs	34	Dobele	Latvia	Day 32	Day 45	11th Evicted; Day 45	8th
Izolina Staņuliene	41	Šeduva	Lithuania	Day 1	Day 46	12th Evicted; Day 46	7th
Heli Kästik	22	Rakvere	Estonia	Day 1	Day 47	13th Evicted; Day 47	6th
Līna Lehtse	20	Tallinn	Estonia	Day 7	Day 48	14th Evicted; Day 48	5th
Audrius Berņusis	28	Tauragė	Lithuania	Day 32	Day 49	15th Evicted; Day 49	4th
Kalle Talvi	45	Tallinn	Estonia	Day 1	Day 50	16th Evicted; Day 50	3rd
Nerijus Cesiulis	21	Alytus	Lithuania	Day 1	Day 50	Runner-up; Day 50	2nd
Una Jēkabsone	20	Riga	Latvia	Day 1	Day 50	Winner; Day 50	1st

== The game ==
Week	Head of Farm	1st Dueler	2nd Dueler	Evicted	Finish
1	None	Marisa	Heli	Maria	1st Evicted; Day 5
1	None	Izolina	Žaneta	Žaneta	2nd Evicted; Day 5
1	None	Ilona	Liene	Ilona	3rd Evicted; Day 5
2	Heli	Madis	Židrūns	Gabriels	Ejected; Day 6
2	Heli	Madis	Židrūns	Židrūns	4th Evicted; Day 10
3	Liene	Gojko	Māris	Gojko	5th Evicted; Day 15
4	Nerijus	Andrus	Madis	Madis	6th Evicted; Day 20
5	Heli; Una (Note: For Week 5, the contestants were divided into two teams. One led my Heli and the other led by Una who were declared the heads of farms for their team.)	Liene	Izolina	Liene	7th Evicted; Day 25
6	Izolina	Andrus	Nerijus	Andrus	8th Evicted; Day 30
7	Una	Māris	Kalle	Māris	9th Evicted; Day 35
8	Kalle	Eve	Heli	Eve	10th Evicted; Day 40
9	Nerijus	Audrius	Guntis	Guntis	11th Evicted; Day 45
10	Elimination Week	Izolina	Līna	Izolina	12th Evicted; Day 46
10	Elimination Week	Līna	Heli	Heli	13th Evicted; Day 47
10	Elimination Week	Audrius	Nerijus	Audrius	14th Evicted; Day 48
10	Elimination Week	Nerijus	Līna	Līna	15th Evicted; Day 49
10	Semi Final	Kalle, Nerijus, Una		Kalle	16th Evicted; Day 50
10	Final Duel	Nerijus	Una	Nerijus	Runner-up; Day 50
10	Final Duel	Nerijus	Una	Una	Winner; Day 50
