= Nerijus Cesiulis =

Lithuanian politician (born 1981)

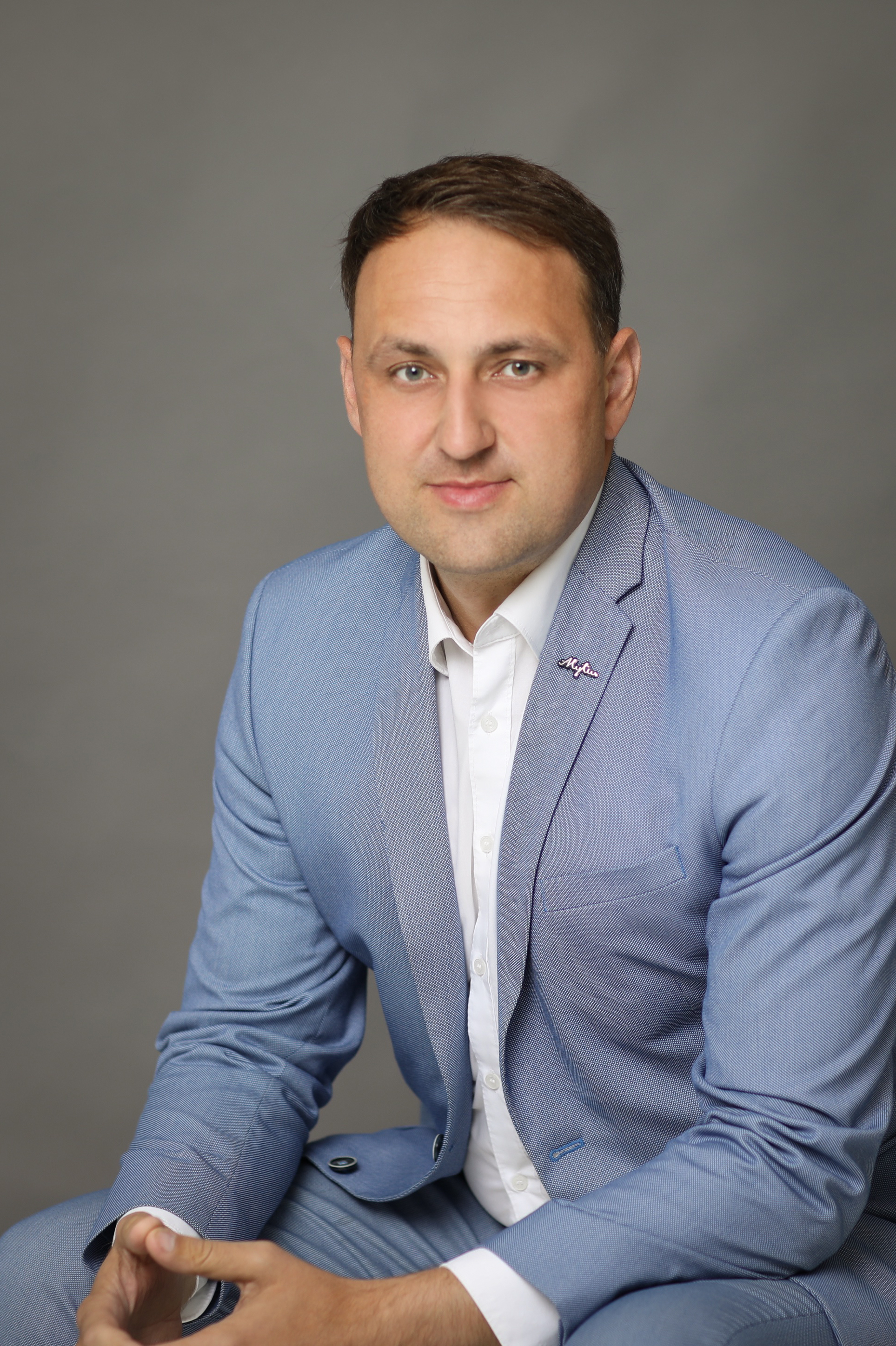
- Cesiulis in 2021

Mayor of Alytus
- Incumbent
- Assumed office 3 March 2019
- Preceded by: Vytautas Grigaravičius

Personal details
- Born: 6 May 1981 (age 44)
- Party: Social Democratic Party

Nerijus Cesiulis (born 6 May 1981) is a Lithuanian politician of the Social Democratic Party serving as mayor of Alytus since 2019. From 2007 to 2019, he was a member of its municipal council. He was speculated as a candidate for president of Lithuania ahead of the 2024 presidential election, and was offered the position of minister of the interior following the 2024 parliamentary election. In 2003, he was a contestant on Baltic Farm.
