= Church of the Blessed Virgin Mary, Help of Christians, Alytus =

Catholic church in Alytus, Lithuania

Church of the Blessed Virgin Mary, Help of Christians Švč. Mergelės Marijos Krikščionių Pagalbos bažnyčia
- Façade of the church in 2014

Religion
- Affiliation: Catholic Church
- Leadership: Roman Catholic Diocese of Vilkaviškis
- Year consecrated: 26 August 1991

Location
- Location: Alytus, Lithuania
- Interactive map of Church of the Blessed Virgin Mary, Help of Christians; Švč. Mergelės Marijos Krikščionių Pagalbos bažnyčia
- Coordinates: 54°23′59.64″N 24°0′38.52″E

Architecture
- Architects: Kęstutis Kisielius, Kęstutis Pempė, Gytis Ramunis
- Type: Church
- Style: Scandinavian architecture
- Completed: 2001

The Church of the Blessed Virgin Mary, Help of Christians (Lithuanian: Švč. Mergelės Marijos Krikščionių Pagalbos bažnyčia) is a Catholic church in Alytus, Lithuania. The church was completed and consecrated in 2001. The exterior is of Scandinavian architecture style.

== Gallery ==
Side-view of the church

Back-view of the church
