= Feliksas Bajoras =

Lithuanian composer and academic (1934–2026)

- Born: Feliksas Romualdas Bajoras; 7 October 1934; Alytus, Lithuania
- Died: 18 May 2026 (aged 91); Vilnius, Lithuania
- Education: Lithuanian Academy of Music and Theatre
- Occupations: Composer; Academic

Feliksas Romualdas Bajoras (7 October 1934 – 18 May 2026) was a Lithuanian composer and academic.

A student of Vincas Bacevičius, he studied violin at the Lithuanian Academy of Music and Theatre, where he became a professor in 1991. His sounds were defined by dodecaphony, aleatoric music, and Lithuanian folklore.

Bajoras died in Vilnius on 18 May 2026, at the age of 91.
