= Alytus =

City in Alytus County, Lithuania

- City Municipality
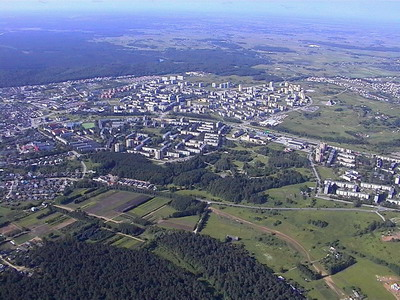
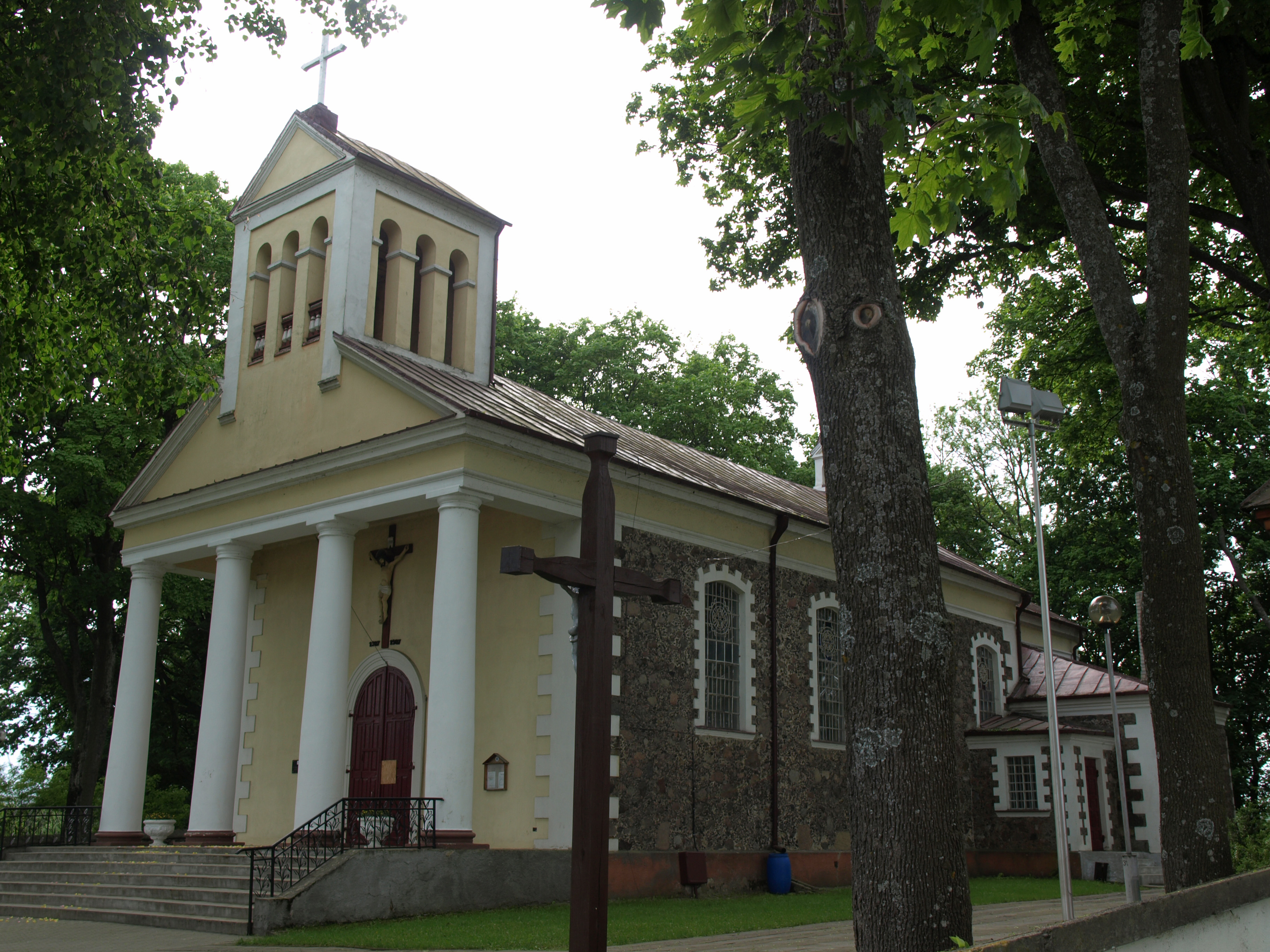
- Aerial view of Alytus Church of St. Louis Church of the Blessed Virgin Mary, Help of Christians Alytus Arena Alytus College

- Flag Coat of arms Brandmark
- Interactive map of Alytus
- Location within Lithuania Location within Europe
- Coordinates: 54°24′05″N 24°02′57″E
- Country: Lithuania
- Region: Dzūkija
- County: Alytus County
- First mentioned: 1377 (649 years ago)
- City privileges: 1581 (445 years ago)
- Capital: Alytus

Government
  - Type: City Council
  - Body: Alytus City Council
  - Mayor: Nerijus Cesiulis (LSDP)
  - Leading: Social Democratic Party 20 / 27

Area
  - Total: 40 km^{2} (15 sq mi)
  - Rank: 60th
- Elevation: 200 m (660 ft)

Population (2026)
  - Total: 49,952
  - Rank: 6th
  - Density: 1,200/km^{2} (3,200/sq mi)
  - Rank: 5th
- Demonym(s): Alytian(s) (English) alytiškiai (Lithuanian)
- Time zone: UTC+2 (EET)
  - Summer (DST): UTC+3 (EEST)
- ZIP Codes: 62001–64355
- Phone code: +370 (315)
- Website: alytus.lt

Alytus (Lithuanian: [ɐlʲiːˈtʊs]) is a city with municipal rights in southern Lithuania. It is the sixth-largest city in Lithuania and the 14th-largest city in the Baltic states, and also the capital of Alytus County. Being the historical centre of the Dzūkija region, it is connected to several major roads, linking it with the cities of Vilnius; Kaunas; Lazdijai, which is on the border with Poland; and Grodno, Belarus. In July 2024, its total population was counted as 50,996 people. The city lies on the banks of the Nemunas river.

For centuries, the city was divided into two separate entities. Even today, it consists of two parts still frequently referred to as Alytus I and Alytus II. The Alytus I half is smaller, and less developed than the Alytus II half, which forms the city centre with parks, microdistricts and industrial areas.

== Name ==
The name of the city is believed to be derived from the Lithuanian hydronym Alytupis (meaning river). Its name in other languages includes the Polish Olita, (Note: Polish pronunciation: [ɔˈlita]) the German Aliten, the Russian Olita, (Note: Russian: Олита, romanized: Olita) the Belarusian Alita, (Note: Belarusian: Аліта, romanized: Alita) and the Yiddish Alite. (Note: Yiddish: אליטע, romanized: Alite)

== History ==
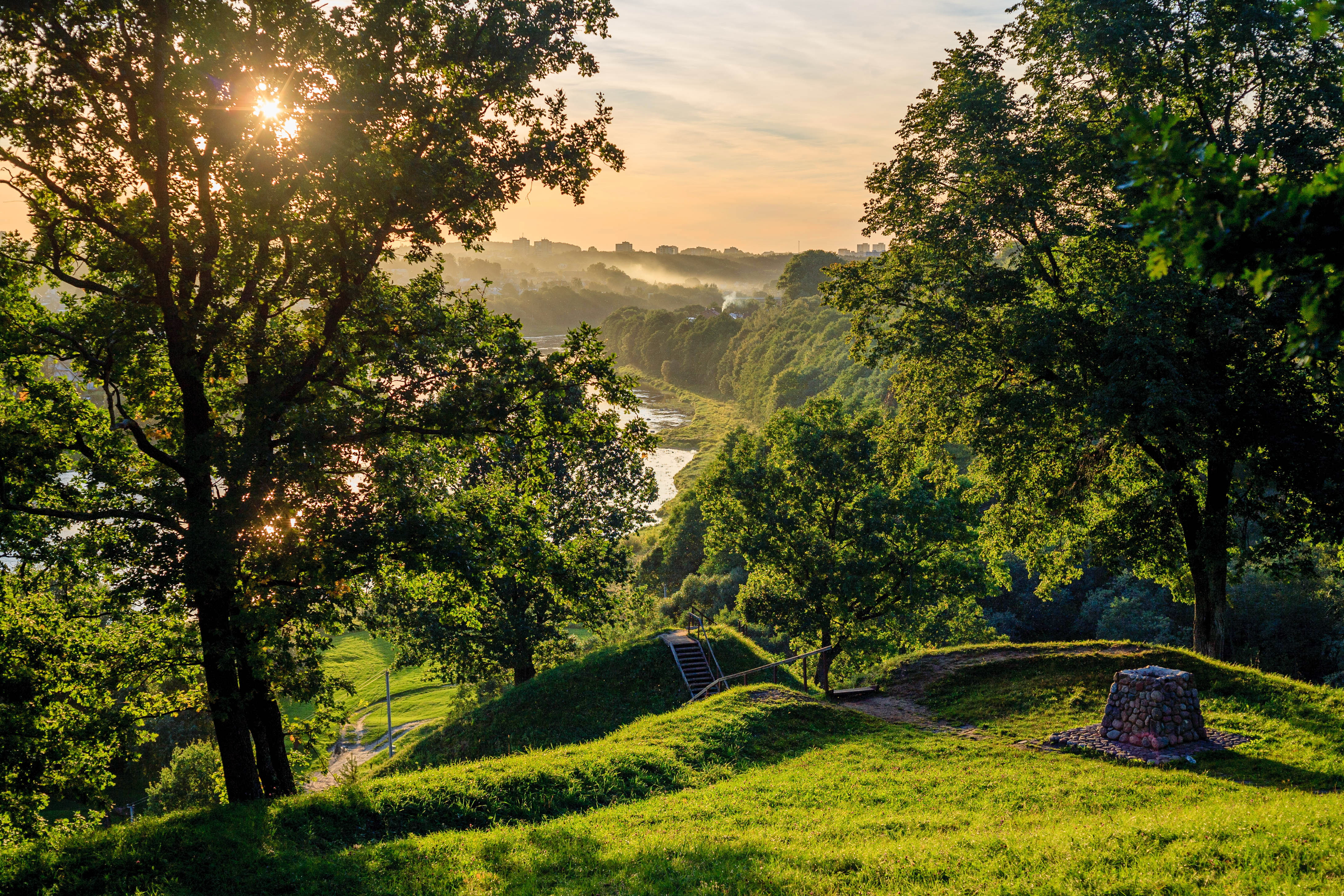
Nemunas river from the Alytus hillfort

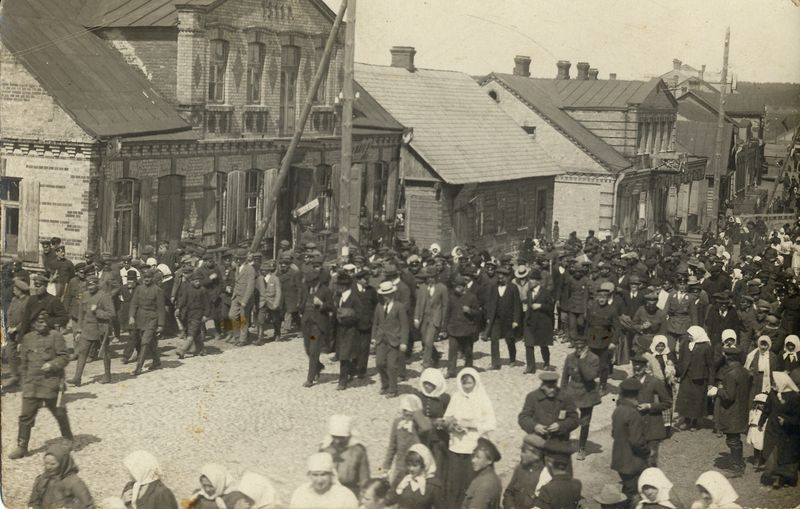
Prime Minister of Lithuania Kazys Grinius' visit to Alytus in 1920

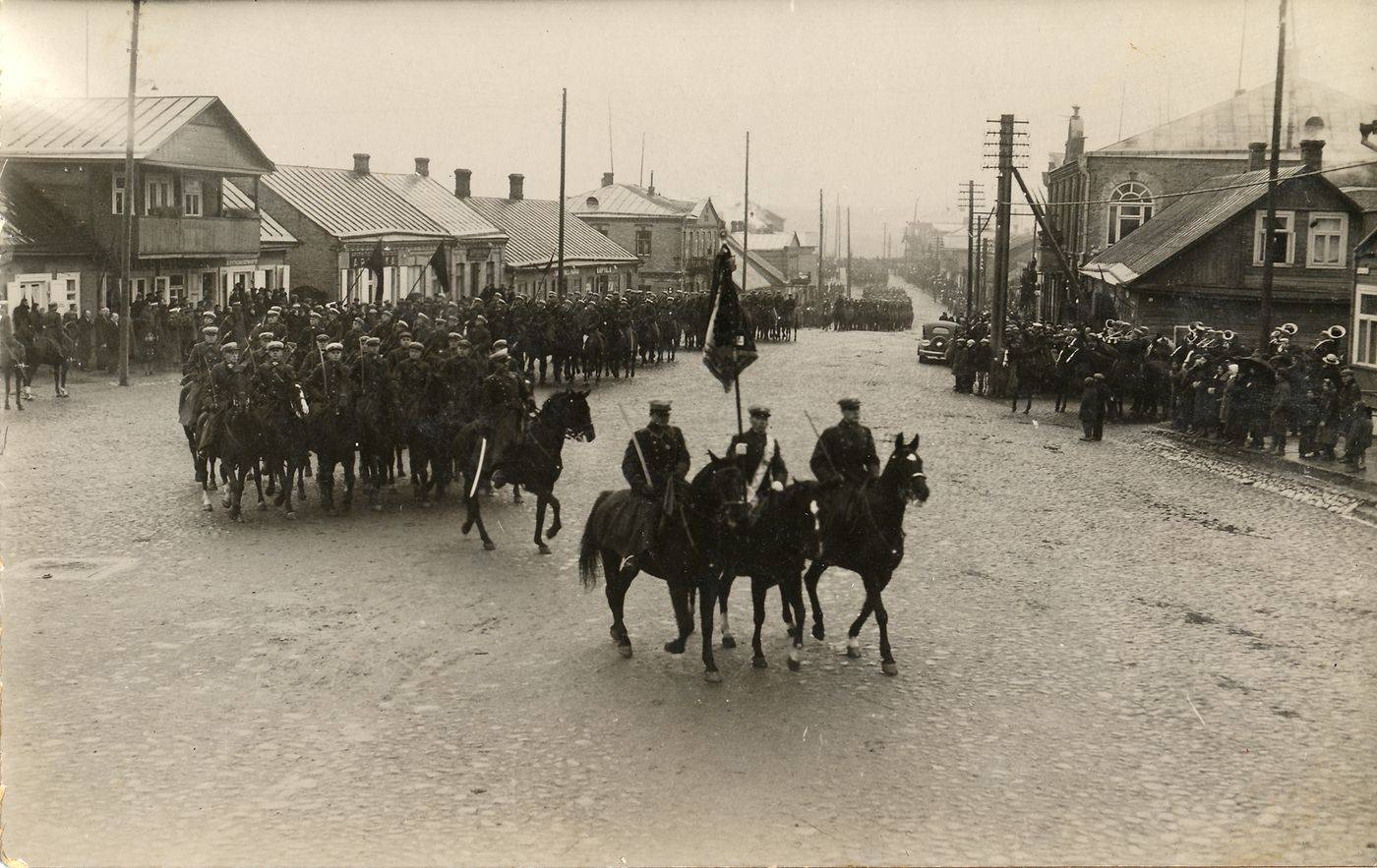
Lithuanian 2nd Uhlan Regiment parading in Alytus in 1936

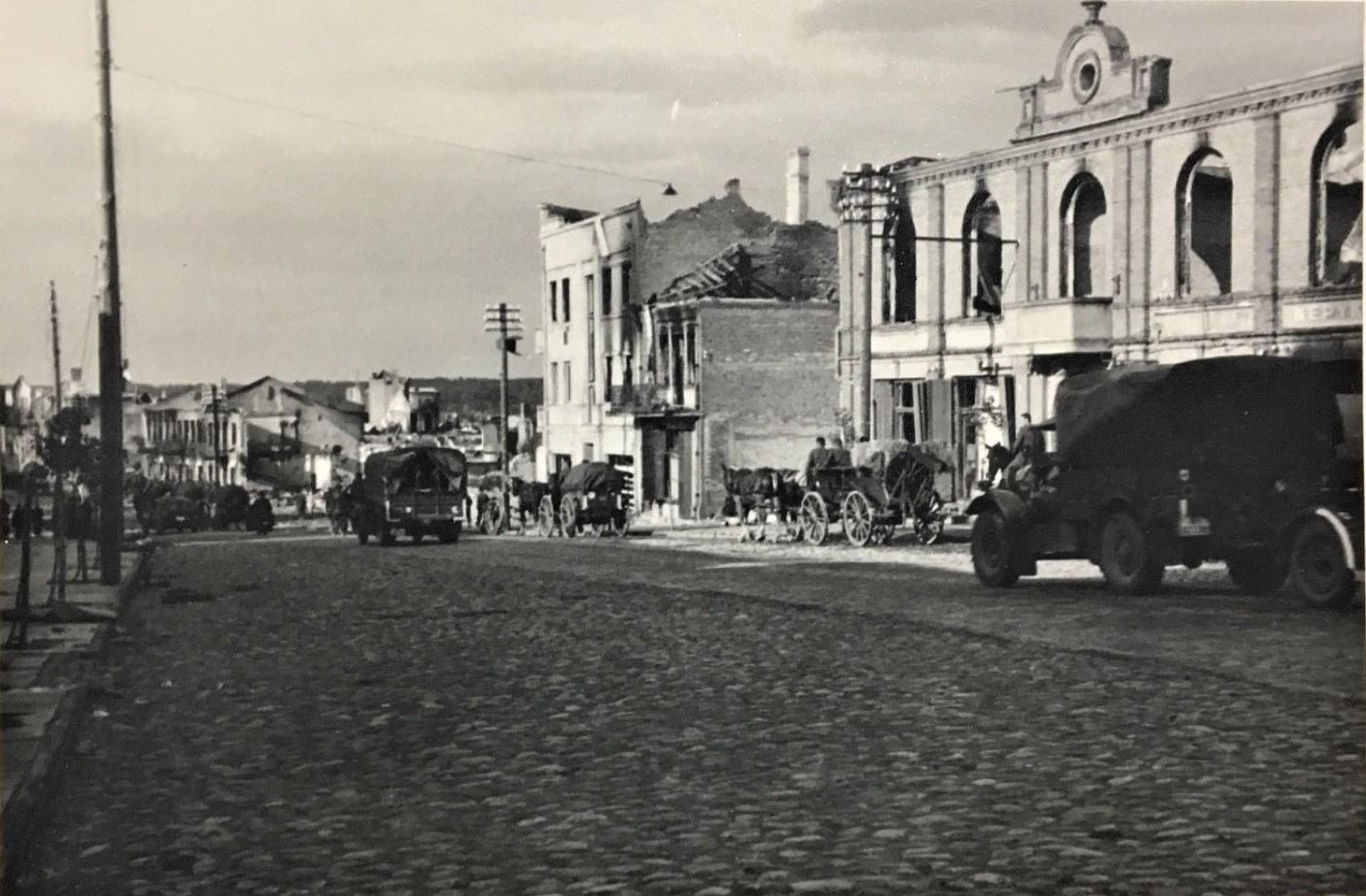
Damaged buildings of the Old Town during World War II in 1941

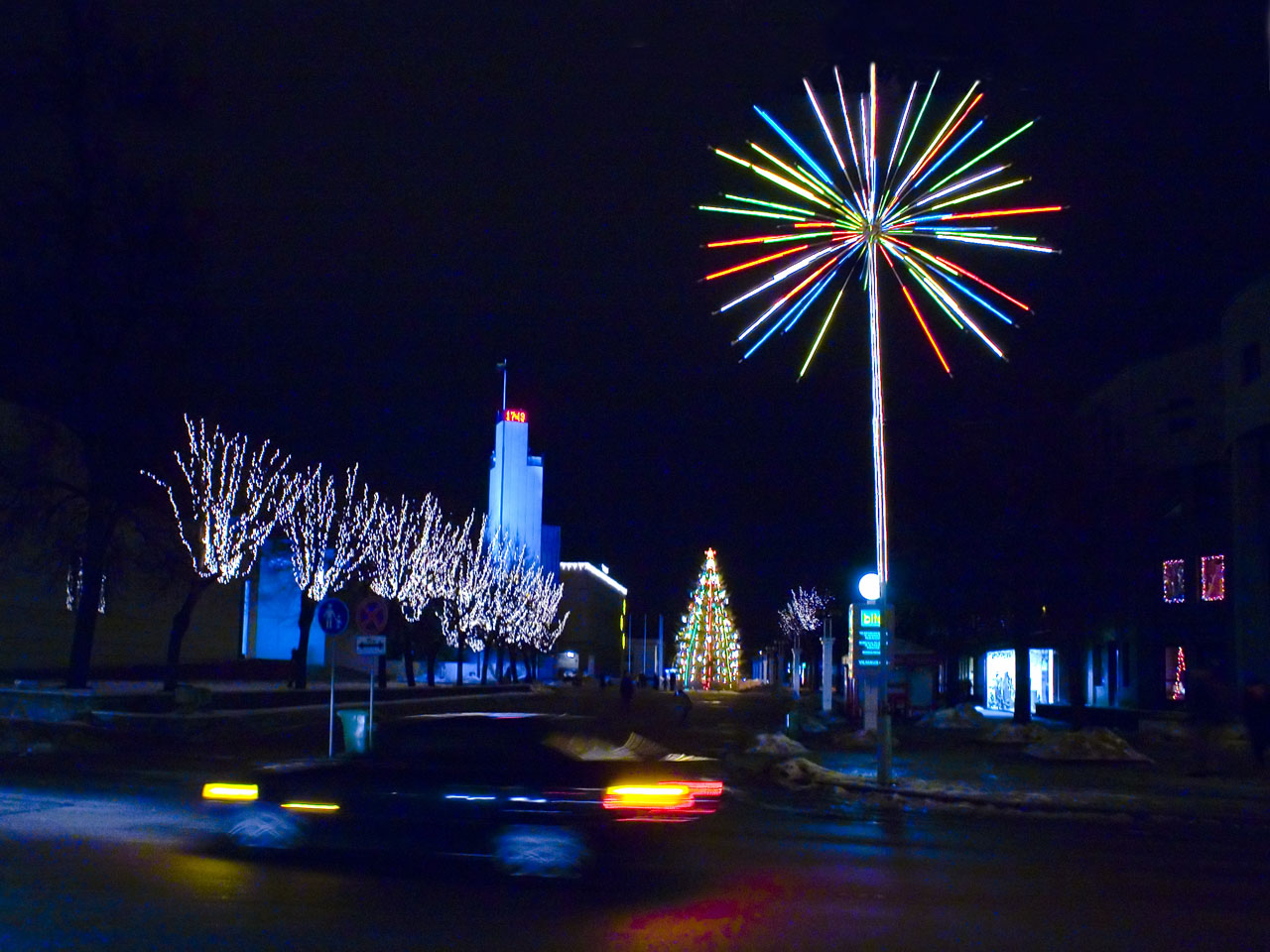
Alytus centre in winter in 2008

The first historical record of Alytus dates back to 1377, when it was mentioned in the Chronicles of Wigand of Marburg under the name of Aliten. According to the chronicle, the spot was occupied by a small, wooden fortress guarding the Lithuanian frontier with the Teutonic Order. The fort and the surrounding village gradually grew, despite being frequently a target of raids of both the Lithuanians and the Teutons. The Treaty of Lake Melno left the town on the Teutonic side of the border, but it was retaken soon afterwards. On 15 June 1581, Stephen Báthory, the Grand Duke of Lithuania and King of Poland, granted the town the city rights based on the Magdeburg Law. The event is celebrated as the Alytus Day.

Until the Partitions of the Polish–Lithuanian Commonwealth the town was a part of the Trakai Voivodeship of the Grand Duchy of Lithuania and a notable center of commerce on the Nemunas river, serving as the main route for export goods from Lithuania proper. The town was also important as the place where one of the royal economic offices was located. In the third partition of Poland and Lithuania, in 1795, the town was divided between the Russian Empire and the Kingdom of Prussia. During the Napoleonic Wars, following the Treaty of Tilsit, the western part was ceded to the Duchy of Warsaw. After the Congress of Vienna, it became part of the duchy's successor state, the Kingdom of Poland. Although the semi-autonomous state was tied with a personal union with Russia, both parts of the town remained completely separate until the January Uprising of 1863. After that date, the autonomy of Poland was liquidated, but both parts of the town were still governed separately.

During the late 19th century, the town became part of a chain of Russian military garrisons stationed along the East Prussian border. It was integrated into the wider transport network through the addition of a new railway line and road. Furthermore, to advance the Russification policies of the era, the Tsarist administration constructed military barracks and an Eastern Orthodox church, which was later reconsecrated as a Catholic church. However, despite the fortification effort by the Russians, during World War I, the Central Powers managed to capture the town intact, without any major skirmish. In 1915, the town was incorporated into the so-called Ober Ost and both parts were once again united into a single administrative entity for the first time since 1795.

Following the end of World War I the area remained contested by newly independent Poland and Lithuania, with the actual control held by the German army stationed in the area. When the Germans withdrew in early 1919, the town was seized by the Red Army. On 12 February 1919, the town became a battlefield for the first skirmish between the Russians and the Lithuanian forces, which eventually took control over it. Since then the town has been a part of the Republic of Lithuania.

Following the invasion of Poland a large prisoner of war camp for Polish soldiers was established in the city. During World War II, Alytus was under German occupation from 22 June 1941 until 15 July 1944. Following the German occupation of the city in 1941, the camp was converted into a prison camp for Soviet soldiers (Stalag 343). The 1965 Soviet-era book Masinės žudynės Lietuvoje, 1941–1944 lists two major mass graves in Alytus: Vidzgiris forest, then at the southeastern suburbs on the left bank of the river, estimated 60,000 people, most likely Jews from the eastern Soviet Union, and the Alytus forest, then at the eastern suburbs, estimated 35,000 people, most probably Soviet prisoners of war. Historian Gintaras Lučinskas argues that these numbers were politicized and grossly inflated, and the actual number of victims is in single digits of thousands.

In 2015, a high-voltage direct current back-to-back station was inaugurated west of Alytus for the realization of the LitPol Link, a power connection between Poland and Lithuania. The facility was built by Swedish-Swiss company ABB. It has a transmission capacity of 500 MW at a voltage of ±70 kV.

The coat of arms features a white rose, one of two coat of arms in the country that features roses. The bridge of the "White Rose" is the country's largest pedestrian bridge, whose name was chosen by the citizens. The bridge was built on the remains of a railway bridge, which was blown up by the Russians when they were retreating in 1915.

== Climate ==
Alytus has a humid continental climate with quite large seasonal differences.

Climate data for Alytus
Month	Jan	Feb	Mar	Apr	May	Jun	Jul	Aug	Sep	Oct	Nov	Dec	Year
Mean daily maximum °C (°F)	−2.2 (28.0)	−1.1 (30.0)	3.9 (39.0)	11.1 (52.0)	18.3 (64.9)	21.1 (70.0)	22.2 (72.0)	22.2 (72.0)	16.7 (62.1)	11.1 (52.0)	4.4 (39.9)	−0.6 (30.9)	10.6 (51.1)
Daily mean °C (°F)	−5.0 (23.0)	−4.4 (24.1)	0.0 (32.0)	6.1 (43.0)	12.2 (54.0)	15.6 (60.1)	16.7 (62.1)	16.7 (62.1)	12.2 (54.0)	7.2 (45.0)	2.2 (36.0)	−2.8 (27.0)	6.4 (43.5)
Mean daily minimum °C (°F)	−7.8 (18.0)	−7.8 (18.0)	−3.9 (25.0)	1.1 (34.0)	6.1 (43.0)	10.0 (50.0)	11.7 (53.1)	10.6 (51.1)	7.2 (45.0)	3.3 (37.9)	0.0 (32.0)	−5.0 (23.0)	2.1 (35.8)
Average rainfall mm (inches)	41 (1.6)	27 (1.1)	36 (1.4)	41 (1.6)	56 (2.2)	74 (2.9)	80 (3.1)	70 (2.8)	60 (2.4)	48 (1.9)	51 (2.0)	50 (2.0)	634 (25.0)
Average precipitation days	8	9	14	16	16	12	13	14	12	14	8	7	143

== Culture ==
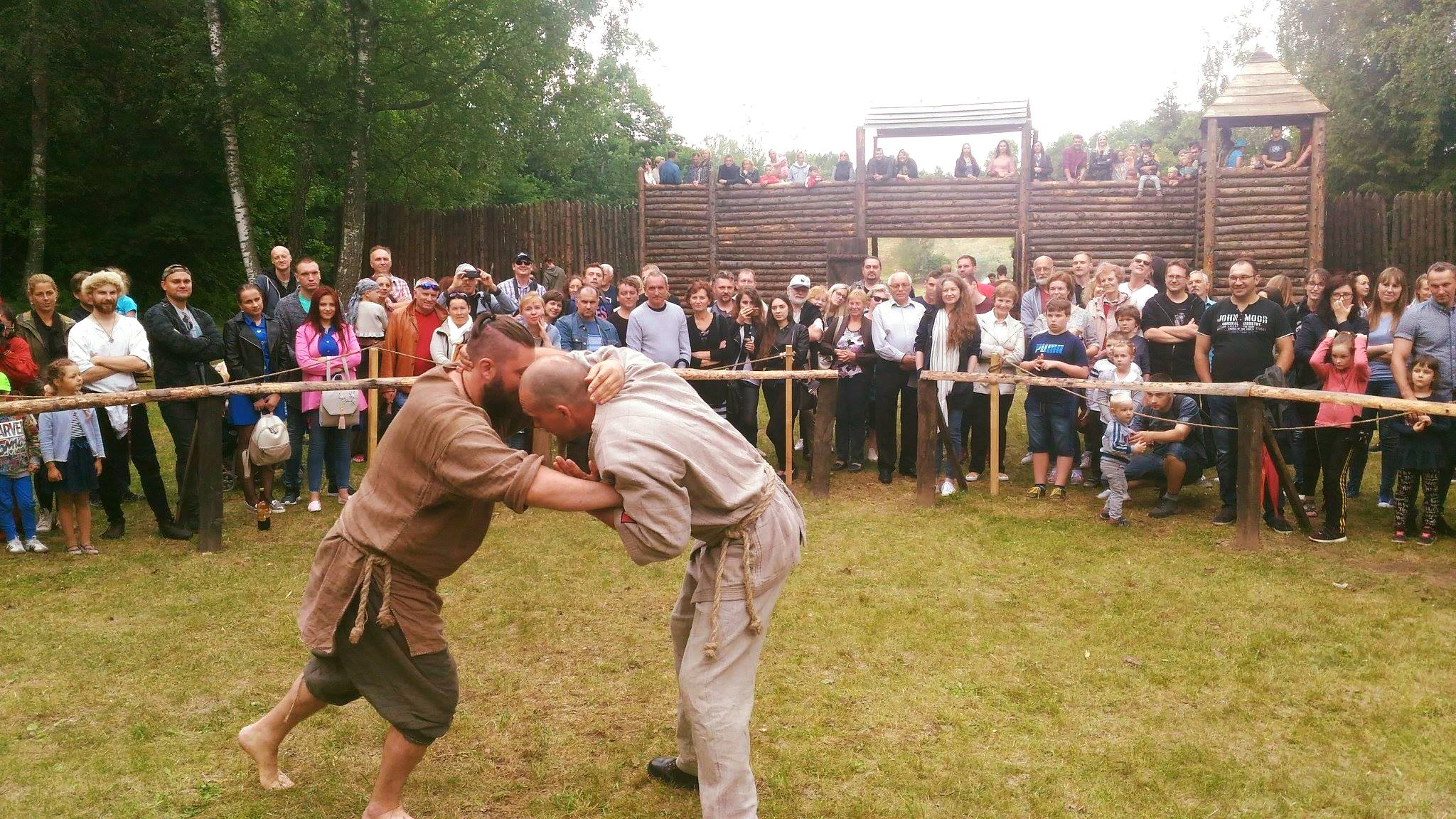
History Festival Jotvos vartai, dedicated to the Yotvingians' legacy

Alytus hosted the Art Strike Biennial between 18 and 24 August 2009 in response to Vilnius becoming European Capital of Culture for 2009. This included a demonstration and a three sided football match. The universal indoor Alytus Arena hosted the Eurobasket 2011 Group C matches in Alytus. In 2010, Alytus was awarded the Honourable Plate of the European Council.

Alytus has a museum dedicated to veterans of both the Afghan wars.

In Alytus, several Bonsai exhibitions were held with participants from European and other countries, such as Japan and the United States.

Alytus has hosted an annual tomato tasting from 2007 to 2013. Participants offer a wide variety of tomatoes and discuss the various factors which help produce a rich crop of the fruit. Alytus has an industrial company named Snaigė, which manufactures refrigerators.

In 2025, Dainava Cinema (which was established in 1960) was reopened after extensive modernization and is one of the most visited places in Alytus.

== Notable people ==
- Zalman Dolinsky (1871–1911), an Orthodox Jewish rabbi
- Mykolas Burokevičius (1927–2016), a communist political leader in Lithuania
- Feliksas Bajoras (1934–2026), composer and academic
- Vida Marija Čigriejienė (born 1936), physician, politician and professor.
- Jurgis Kunčinas (1947–2002), poet and novelist, won the Lithuanian Writers Union prize in 1994
- Vytautas Kolesnikovas (1948–2021), a painter, graphic artist and politician
- Romas Kalanta (1953–1972), a self-immolating protestor against the Soviet regime
- Nerijus Cesiulis (born 1981), politician, mayor of Alytus since 2019
- Justina Gringytė (born 1986), operatic mezzo-soprano
- Ieva Budraitė (born 1992), politician and leader of the Lithuanian Green Party

=== Sport ===
- Gintaras Staučė (born 1969), football goalkeeper, played 297 games and 61 for Lithuania
- Gintaras Savukynas (born 1971), Lithuania men's national handball team captain.
- Tomas Pačėsas (born 1971), former basketball player, basketball coach, businessman and politician
- Donatas Vencevičius (born 1973), football manager and former player who played over 290 games and 33 for Lithuania
- Gintaras Andriuškevičius (born 1975), race walker, competed at the 2004 Summer Olympics
- Darius Škarnulis (born 1977), race walker, competed at the 2008 Summer Olympics
- Aivaras Baranauskas (born 1980), a retired track cyclist, competed at the 2004 Summer Olympics
- Aksana (wrestler) (born 1982), fitness model, bodybuilder and retired professional wrestler.
- Žydrūnas Karčemarskas (born 1983), football goalkeeper, played 347 games and 66 for Lithuania
- Vytautas Lukša (born 1984), footballer who played over 370 games and 27 for Lithuania
- Darvydas Šernas (born 1984), footballer who played over 390 games and 47 for Lithuania
- Tadas Labukas (born 1984), footballer who played over 430 games and 18 for Lithuania
- Mindaugas Panka (born 1984), footballer who played over 350 games and 40 for Lithuania
- Brigita Virbalytė-Dimšienė (born 1985), a female race walker who competed at the 2012 Summer Olympics
- Deivydas Matulevičius (born 1989), footballer who played 279 games and 40 for Lithuania
- Vytautas Andriuškevičius (born 1990), footballer, played 216 games and 31 for Lithuania
- Donatas Dundzys (born 1991), a Paralympic athlete who competed in the shot-pit and discuss at the 2020 Summer Paralympics

== Twin towns – sister cities ==
Alytus is twinned with:

- Amata, Latvia
- Berdychiv, Ukraine
- Botkyrka, Sweden
- Crawley, United Kingdom
- Ełk, Poland
- General San Martín, Argentina
- Giżycko County, Poland
- Hiratsuka, Japan
- Kremenchuk, Ukraine
- Mandal, Norway
- Næstved, Denmark
- Ningbo, China
- Opole, Poland
- Ostrołęka, Poland
- Rochester, United States
- Rouen, France
- Suwałki, Poland
- Vélizy-Villacoublay, France

The city was previously twinned with:

- Grodno, Belarus
- Lida, Belarus
- Petrozavodsk, Russia
- Smarhonʹ, Belarus

== Gallery ==
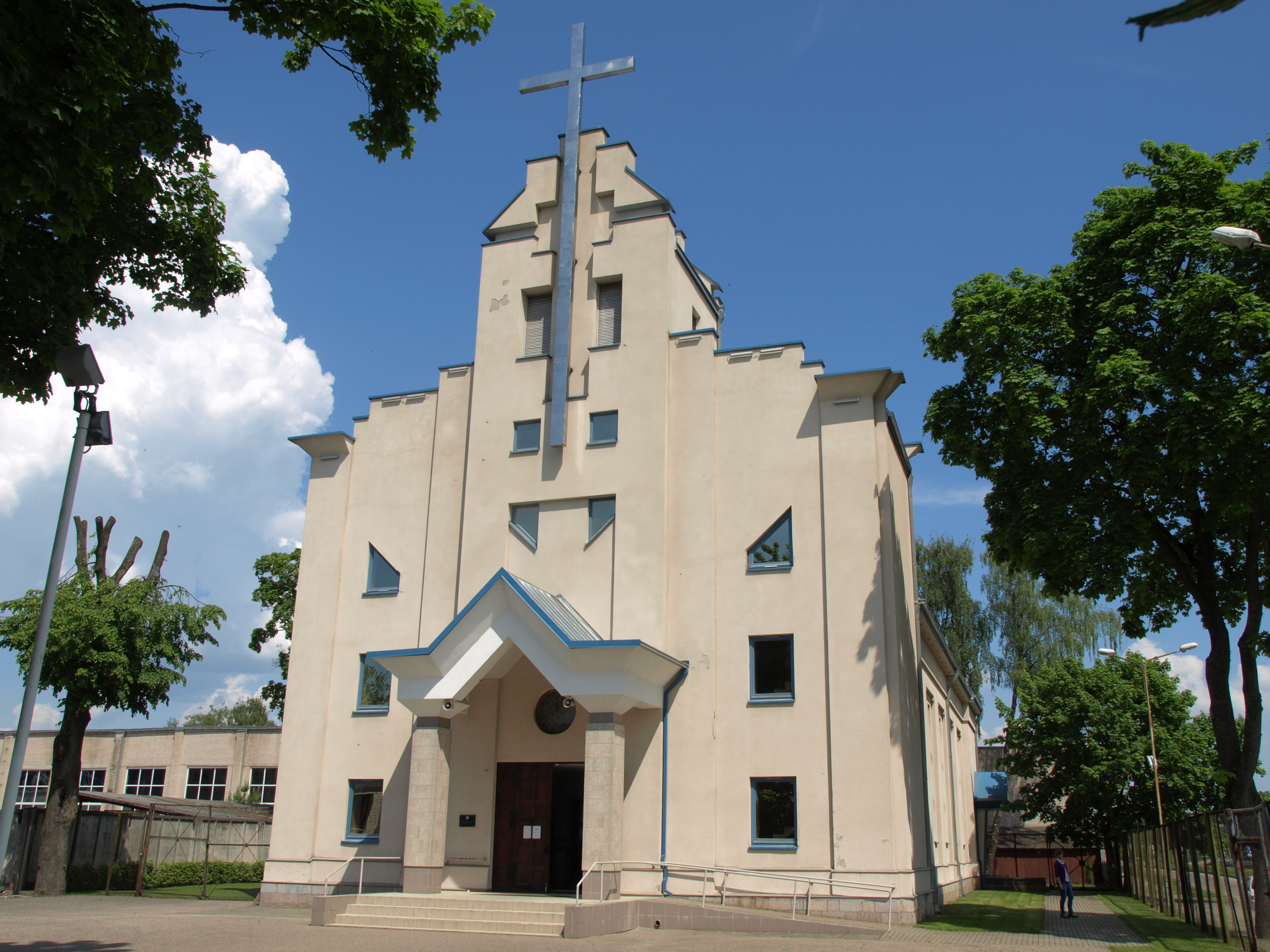
Saint Casimir Church

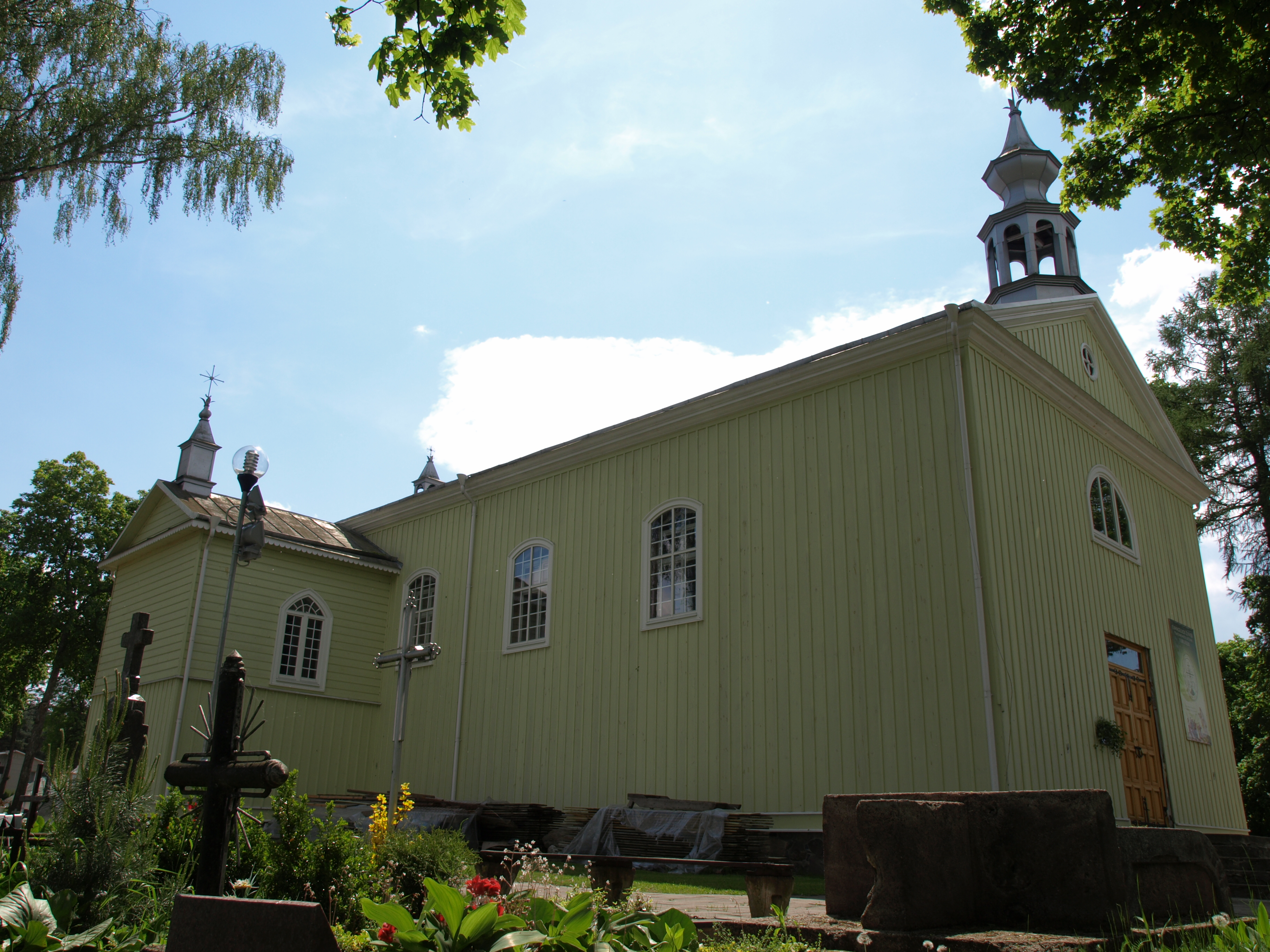
Church of the Guardian Angels

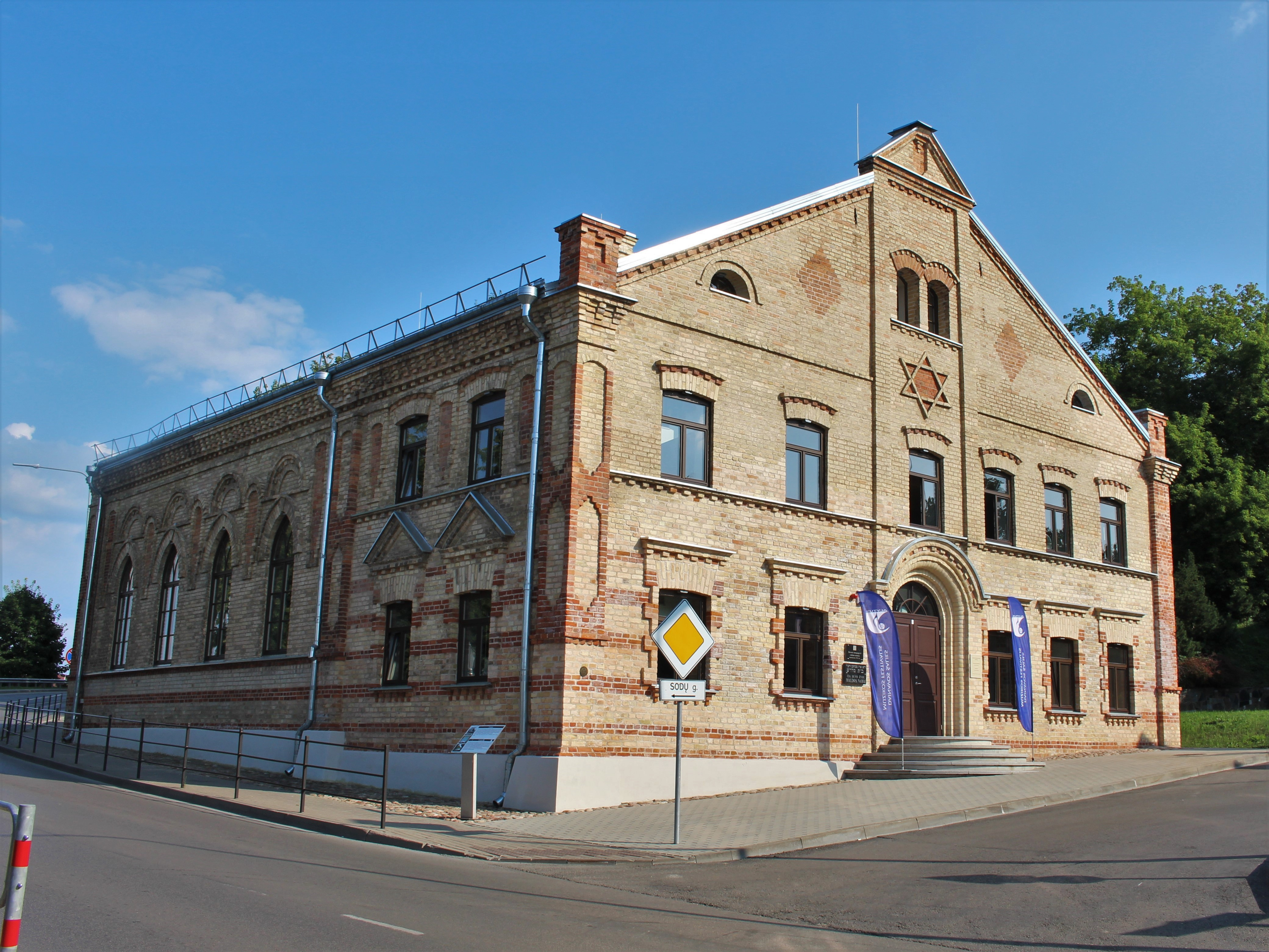
Alytus Synagogue

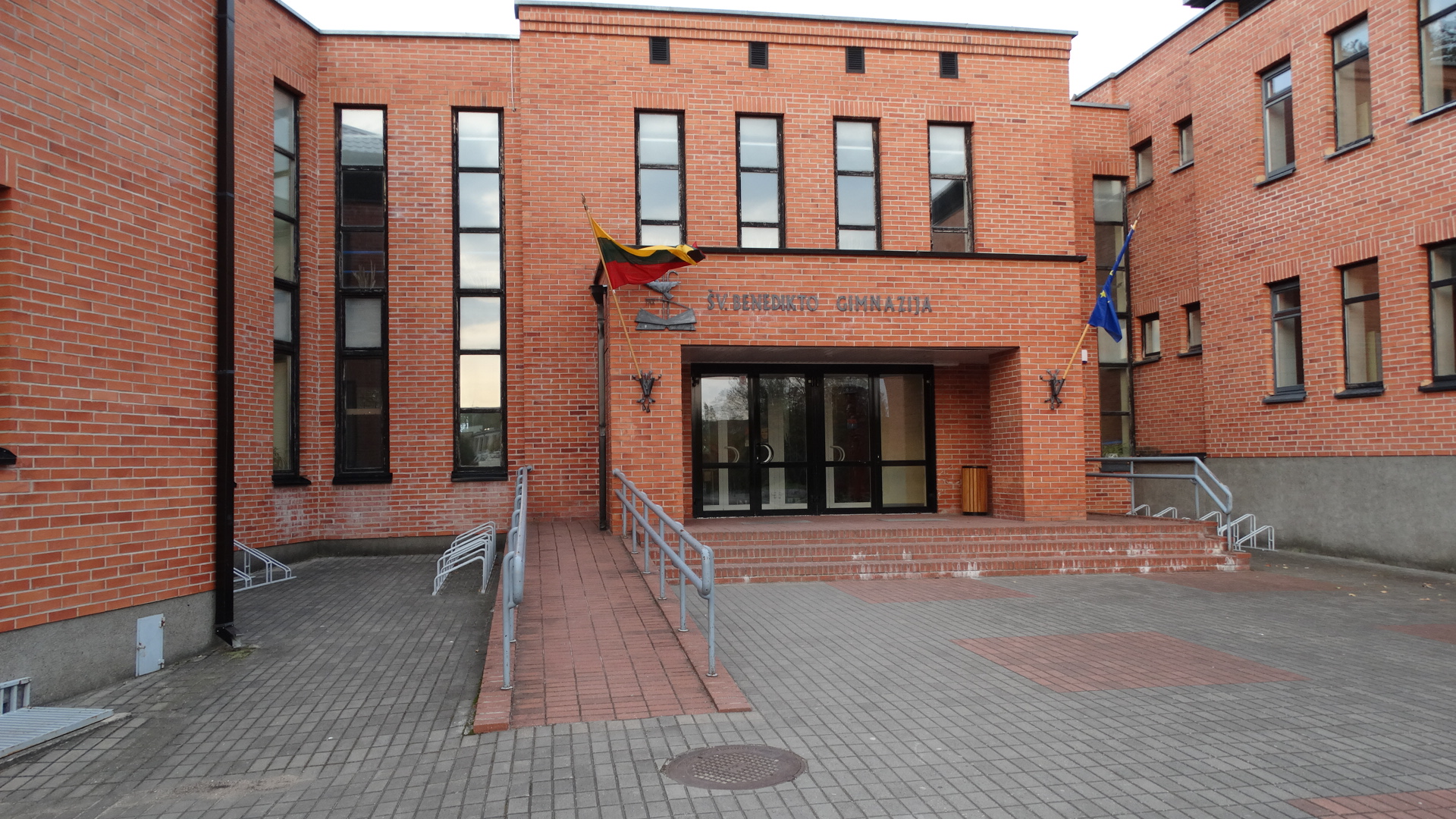
Saint Benedict Gymnasium

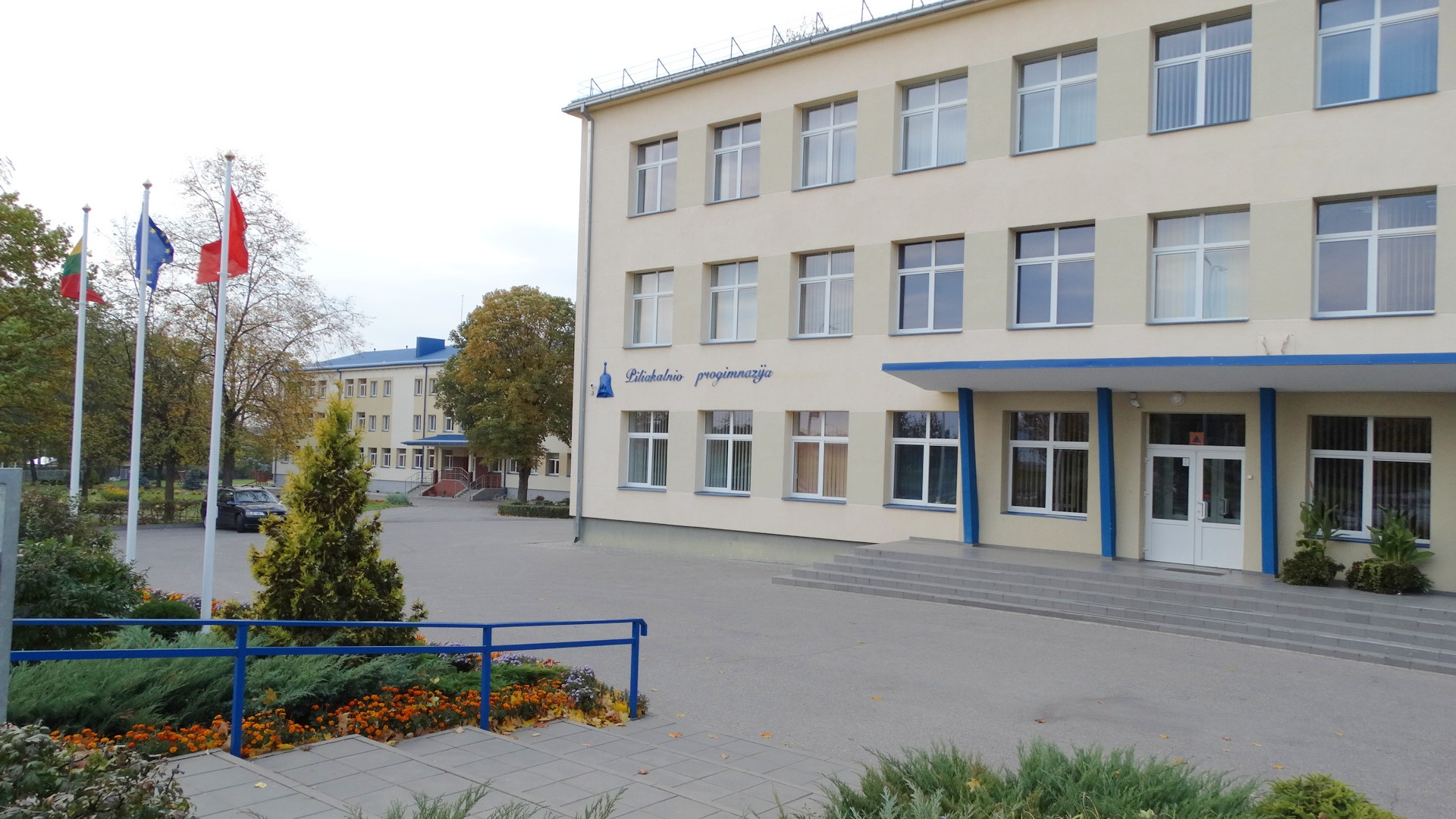
Piliakalnis Progymnasium

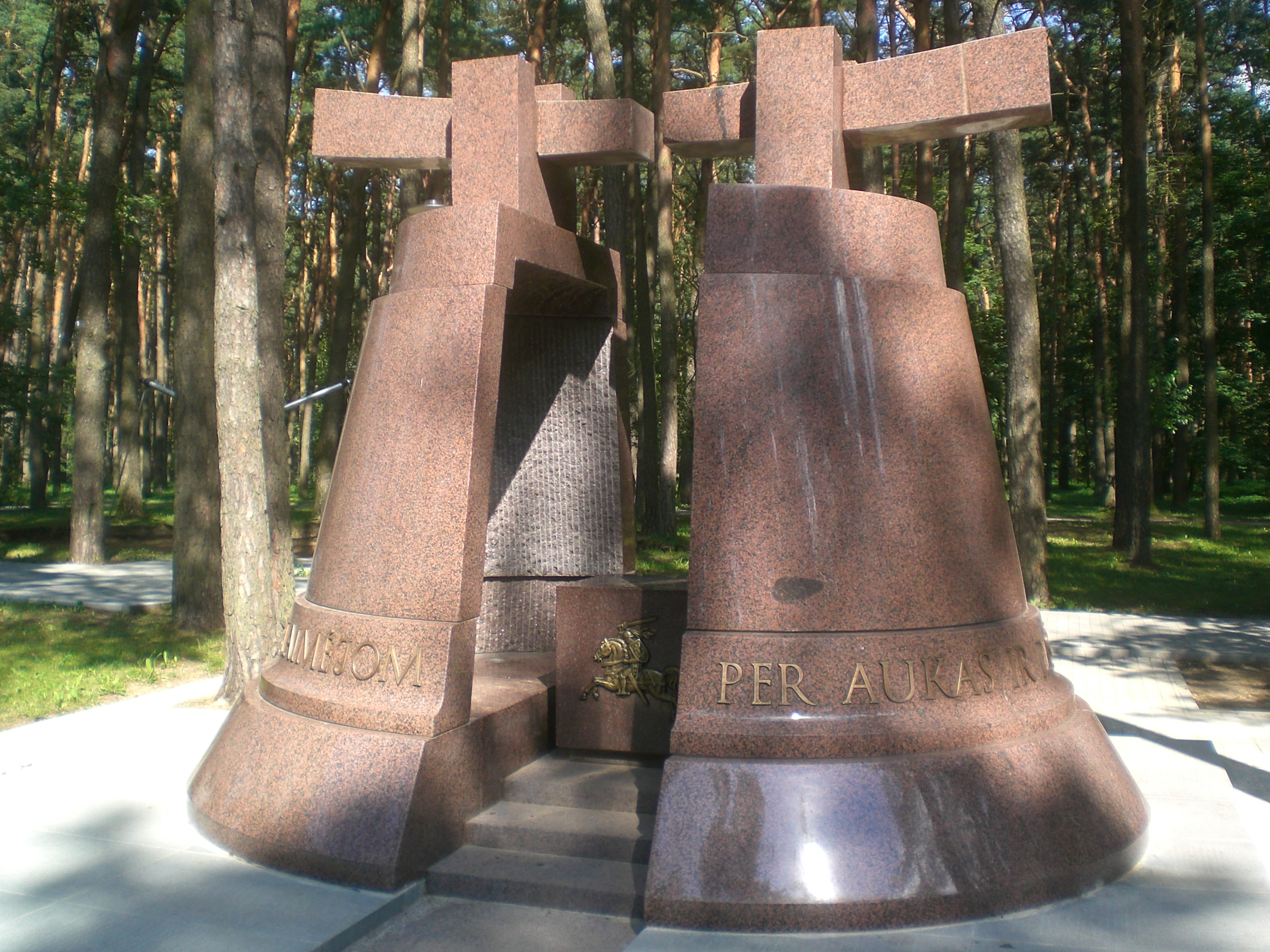
"Silent bell" memorial for the Lithuanian partisans

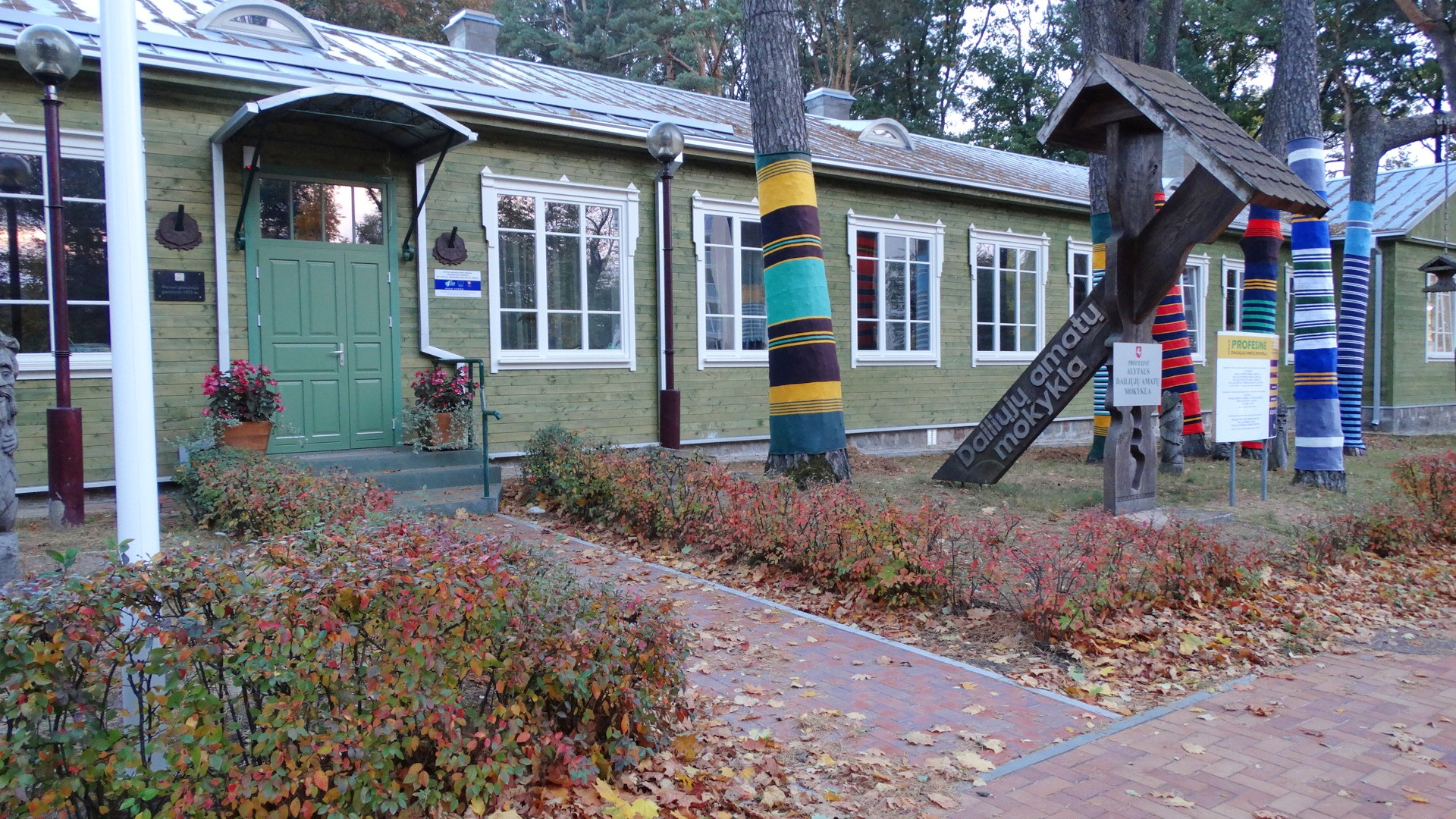
School of Fine Crafts

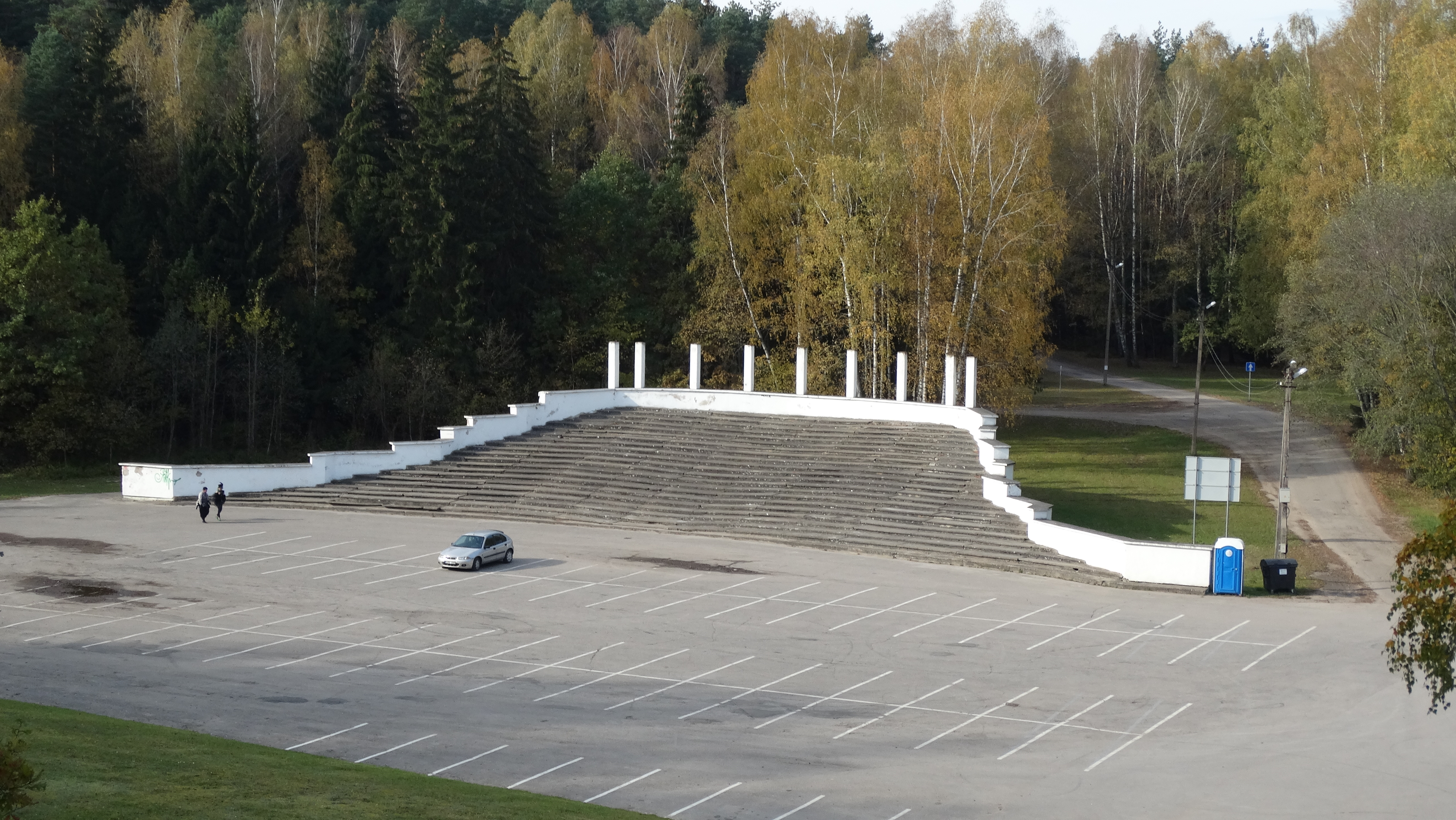
Stage in the Valley of Songs

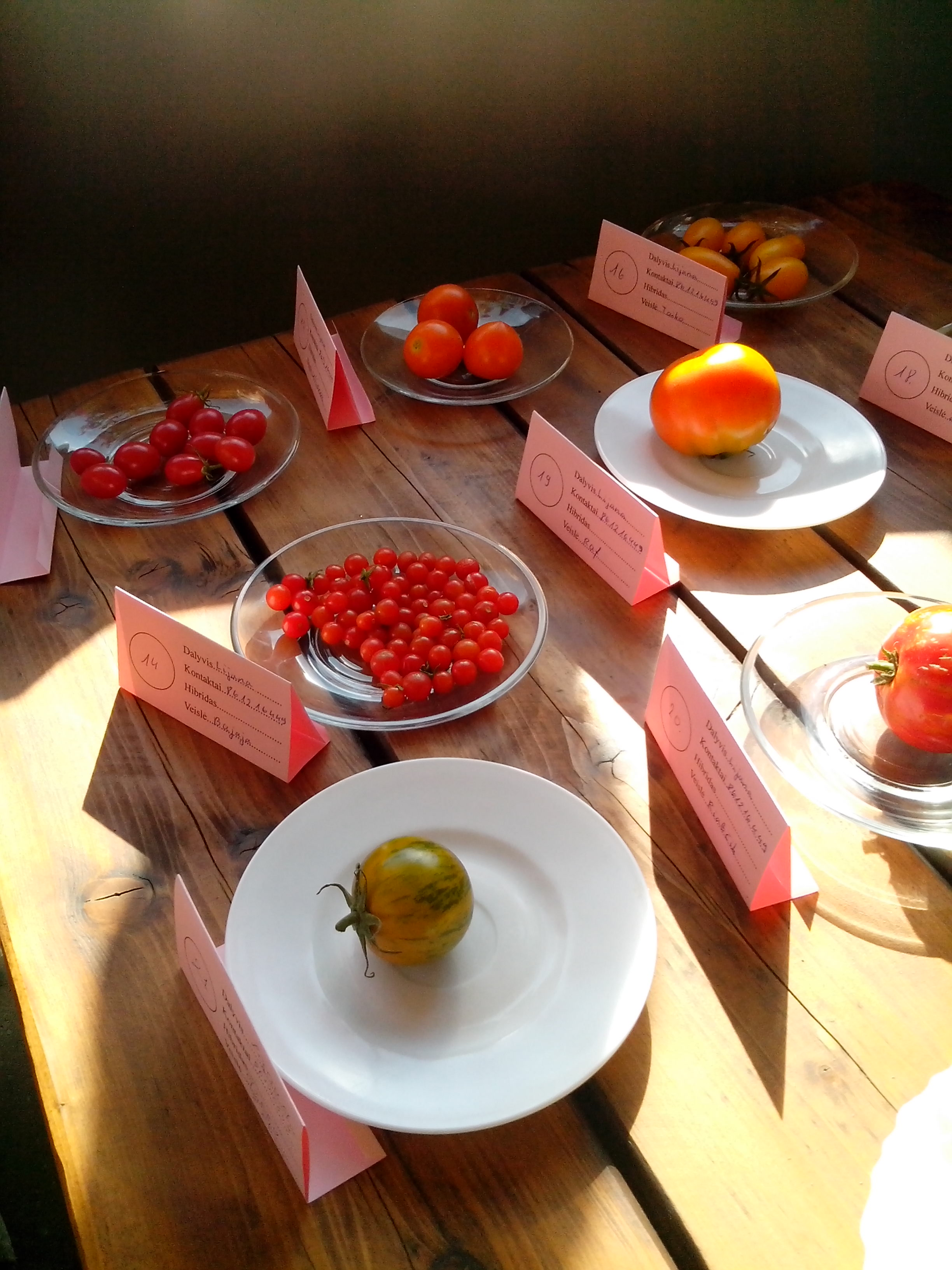
Alytus Tomato Tasting 2013

== Crater of Mars ==
In 1979, one of craters in planet Mars was named 'Alitus' after the city of Alytus by the International Astronomical Union.
