= Vytautas Kolesnikovas =

Lithuanian politician and artist (1948–2021)

Vytautas Kolesnikovas (25 October 1948 – 1 October 2021) was a painter, graphic artist, politician, and signatory of the 1990 Act of the Re-Establishment of the State of Lithuania.

From 1968 to 1974 Kolesnikovas studied art in Moscow. After returning to Lithuania he worked at several regional firms in Alytus and presented his artwork at several exhibitions. In 1988 he joined activities of the Sąjūdis movement and was elected to the Supreme Soviet of the Lithuanian SSR. Kolesnikovas was a member of the Commission of Science, Education, and Culture in the Supreme Council – Reconstituent Seimas. After the 1993 elections, he returned to Alytus and joined Department of Cultural Heritage. In 2008, after more than 20 years since last exhibition, Kolesnikovas organized a personal exhibition of his work in Alytus.
