= Twelfth Seimas =

Twelfth Seimas of Lithuania
←	Eleventh Seimas of Lithuania	Thirteenth Seimas of Lithuania	→
- Seimas Palace

Overview
- Legislative body: Seimas
- Jurisdiction: Lithuania
- Term: 2016—2020

The Twelfth Seimas of Lithuania is a parliament (Seimas) in Lithuania. Elections took place on 9 October 2016, with the run-off on 23 October. The Seimas commenced its work on 14 November 2016 and served a four-year term, with the last session taking place on 10 November 2020.

In this term two members-elect were born after 11 March 1990 (Rūta Miliūtė and Virginijus Sinkevičius).

== Elections ==
In the elections in 2016, 70 members of the parliament were elected on proportional party lists and 71 in single-member constituencies. Elections took place on 9 October 2012. Run-off elections were held on 23 October in the single-seat constituencies where no candidate secured a seat in the first round.

Party	Nationwide constituency			Single-member constituencies						Total seats	+/–
Party	Nationwide constituency			First round			Second round			Total seats	+/–
Party	Votes	%	Seats	Votes	%	Seats	Votes	%	Seats	Total seats	+/–
Homeland Union – Lithuanian Christian Democrats	276,275	22.63	20	258,834	21.57	1	246,108	27.94	10	31	–2
Lithuanian Peasant and Greens Union	274,108	22.45	19	229,769	19.15	0	311,611	35.38	35	54	+53
Social Democratic Party of Lithuania	183,597	15.04	13	183,267	15.27	0	115,599	13.12	4	17	–21
Liberal Movement	115,361	9.45	8	139,522	11.63	0	70,055	7.95	6	14	+4
Anti-Corruption Coalition (LCP–LPP)	77,114	6.32	0	36,621	3.05	0	6,876	0.78	1	1	New
Electoral Action of Poles in Lithuania – Christian Families Alliance	69,810	5.72	5	63,291	5.27	2	13,526	1.54	1	8	0
Order and Justice	67,817	5.55	5	70,958	5.91	0	28,894	3.28	3	8	–3
Labour Party	59,620	4.88	0	79,824	6.65	0	25,803	2.93	2	2	–27
Lithuanian Freedom Union (Liberals)	27,274	2.23	0	39,987	3.33	0	10,130	1.15	0	0	New
Lithuanian Green Party	24,727	2.03	0	11,047	0.92	0	5,627	0.64	1	1	New
Political Party "Lithuanian List"	21,966	1.80	0	17,519	1.46	0	8,709	0.99	1	1	New
Lithuanian People's Party	12,851	1.05	0	9,767	0.81	0	–	–	–	0	0
Against Corruption and Poverty (JL–LTS)	6,867	0.56	0	4,150	0.35	0	–	–	–	0	New
The Way of Courage	3,498	0.29	0	4,619	0.38	0	–	–	–	0	–7
Independents	–	–	–	50,738	4.23	0	37,919	4.30	4	4	+1
Invalid/blank votes	52,469	–	–	72,789	–	–	32,895	–	–	–	–
Total	1,273,427	100	70	1,272,734	100	3	913,752	100	68	141	0
Registered voters/turnout	2,514,657	50.64	–	2,514,657	50.61	–	2,405,143	37.99	–	–	–
Source: Central Electoral Commission

== Activities ==
Viktoras Pranckietis was elected as a Speaker.

Since 2018 the Lithuanian Farmers and Greens Union tried to obstruct a work of critical of them institutions (notably LRT and Constitutional Court of Lithuania).

== Composition ==
=== Parliamentary groups ===
After the elections, the parliamentary groups were formed in the Seimas, largely on the party lines: Lithuanian Farmers and Greens Union (LVŽSF), Social Democratic Party of Lithuania (LSDPF), Liberal Movement (LSF), Order and Justice (FTT), Electoral Action of the Poles in Lithuania (LLRAF), Homeland Union - Lithuanian Christian Democrats (TSLKDF) and the Mixed Group of Members of the Seimas (MSNG).

The term of the Seimas was noted for particularly significant shifts among parliamentary groups. Most notable examples were Social Democratic Party and Order and Justice parliamentary groups. The former had split into two separate parliamentary groups (and later, parties), while the latter (along with the party) completely disintegrated.

By the end of the term of the Seimas, the following parliamentary groups were active.

Name	Abbr.	Members
Lithuanian Farmers and Greens Union	LVŽSF	49
Homeland Union	TS-LKDF	36
Social Democratic Labour Party of Lithuania	LSDDPF	12
Liberal Movement	LSF	10
Social Democratic Party of Lithuania	LSDPF	9
Electoral Action of Poles in Lithuania – Christian Families Alliance	LLRA–KŠSF	8
Others	MSNG	17
Vacant		1

=== Members ===
144 members have served in the Twelfth Seimas.

Name, Surname	Constituency	Electoral list	Notes
Vida Ačienė	Nationwide	Lithuanian Farmers and Greens Union	
Mantas Adomėnas	Nationwide	Homeland Union	
Virgilijus Alekna	Nationwide	Liberal Movement	
Vilija Aleknaitė-Abramikienė	Nationwide	Homeland Union	From 9 July 2019
Rimas Andrikis	Nationwide	Order and Justice	
Arvydas Anušauskas	Nationwide	Homeland Union	
Aušrinė Armonaitė	Nationwide	Liberal Movement	
Audronius Ažubalis	Nationwide	Homeland Union	
Valius Ąžuolas	39. Akmenės-Mažeikių	Lithuanian Farmers and Greens Union	
Kęstutis Bacvinka	66. Garliavos	Lithuanian Farmers and Greens Union	
Vytautas Bakas	Nationwide	Lithuanian Farmers and Greens Union	
Linas Balsys	11. Panerių	Lithuanian Green Party	
Kęstutis Bartkevičius	38. Mažeikių	Order and Justice	
Mindaugas Bastys	64. Zanavykų	Social Democratic Party of Lithuania	Until 20 March 2018
Rima Baškienė	45. Kuršėnų-Dainų	Lithuanian Farmers and Greens Union	
Juozas Baublys	70. Varėnos-Trakų	Liberal Movement	
Antanas Baura	49. Anykščių-Panevėžio	Lithuanian Farmers and Greens Union	From 11 May 2017
Juozas Bernatonis	Nationwide	Social Democratic Party of Lithuania	
Agnė Bilotaitė	Nationwide	Homeland Union	
Bronius Bradauskas	Nationwide	Social Democratic Party of Lithuania	From 9 July 2019
Rasa Budbergytė	Nationwide	Social Democratic Party of Lithuania	
Valentinas Bukauskas	40. Telšių	Labour Party	
Guoda Burokienė	28. Aukštaitijos	Lithuanian Farmers and Greens Union	
Algirdas Butkevičius	Nationwide	Social Democratic Party of Lithuania	
Petras Čimbaras	54. Molėtų-Širvintų	Labour Party	
Viktorija Čmilytė-Nielsen	Nationwide	Liberal Movement	
Rimantas Jonas Dagys	Nationwide	Homeland Union	
Irena Degutienė	Nationwide	Homeland Union	
Algimantas Dumbrava	52. Visagino-Zarasų	Order and Justice	
Justas Džiugelis	Nationwide	Lithuanian Farmers and Greens Union	
Aurimas Gaidžiūnas	44. Radviliškio	Lithuanian Farmers and Greens Union	
Vitalijus Gailius	46. Žiemgalos	Liberal Movement	Until 10 April 2019
Dainius Gaižauskas	29. Marijampolės	Lithuanian Farmers and Greens Union	
Aistė Gedvilienė	Nationwide	Homeland Union	From 9 July 2019
Arūnas Gelūnas	Nationwide	Liberal Movement	Until 1 April 2019
Eugenijus Gentvilas	Nationwide	Liberal Movement	
Simonas Gentvilas	Nationwide	Liberal Movement	
Kęstutis Glaveckas	Nationwide	Liberal Movement	
Petras Gražulis	Nationwide	Order and Justice	
Arūnas Gumuliauskas	Nationwide	Lithuanian Farmers and Greens Union	
Irena Haase	64. Zanavykų	Homeland Union	From 9 October 2018
Juozas Imbrasas	Nationwide	Order and Justice	
Stasys Jakeliūnas	Nationwide	Lithuanian Farmers and Greens Union	Until 1 July 2019
Audronė Jankuvienė	Nationwide	Lithuanian Farmers and Greens Union	From 9 July 2019
Jonas Jarutis	Nationwide	Lithuanian Farmers and Greens Union	
Zbignev Jedinskij	Nationwide	Electoral Action of Poles in Lithuania	
Sergejus Jovaiša	Nationwide	Homeland Union	
Eugenijus Jovaiša	Nationwide	Lithuanian Farmers and Greens Union	
Rasa Juknevičienė	Nationwide	Homeland Union	Until 1 July 2019
Vytautas Juozapaitis	Nationwide	Homeland Union	
Ričardas Juška	62. Jurbarko-Pagėgių	Liberal Movement	
Vytautas Kamblevičius	Nationwide	Order and Justice	
Darius Kaminskas	43. Kėdainių	Independent	
Ramūnas Karbauskis	14. Šilainių	Lithuanian Farmers and Greens Union	
Laurynas Kasčiūnas	Nationwide	Homeland Union	
Dainius Kepenis	21. Marių	Lithuanian Farmers and Greens Union	
Vytautas Kernagis	5. Fabijoniškių	Homeland Union	
Greta Kildišienė	49. Anykščių-Panevėžio	Lithuanian Farmers and Greens Union	Until 26 January 2016
Gintautas Kindurys	53. Nalšios	Lithuanian Farmers and Greens Union	
Gediminas Kirkilas	Nationwide	Social Democratic Party of Lithuania	
Algimantas Kirkutis	20. Baltijos	Lithuanian Farmers and Greens Union	
Vanda Kravčionok	Nationwide	Electoral Action of Poles in Lithuania	
Dainius Kreivys	12. Verkių	Homeland Union	
Asta Kubilienė	Nationwide	Lithuanian Farmers and Greens Union	
Andrius Kubilius	Nationwide	Homeland Union	Until 1 July 2019
Andrius Kupčinskas	Nationwide	Homeland Union	From 10 March 2018
Gabrielius Landsbergis	13. Centro-Žaliakalnio	Homeland Union	
Tadas Langaitis	Nationwide	Homeland Union	Until 1 March 2018
Jonas Liesys	58. Trakų-Vievio	Liberal Movement	
Linas Antanas Linkevičius	Nationwide	Social Democratic Party of Lithuania	
Michal Mackevič	Nationwide	Electoral Action of Poles in Lithuania	
Mykolas Majauskas	2. Senamiesčio	Homeland Union	
Aušra Maldeikienė	4. Žirmūnų	Political Party "Lithuanian List"	Until 30 June 2019
Bronius Markauskas	31. Gargždų	Lithuanian Farmers and Greens Union	Until 10 April 2019
Raimundas Martinėlis	50. Sėlos	Independent	
Kęstutis Masiulis	Nationwide	Homeland Union	
Bronislovas Matelis	26. Nevėžio	Independent	
Laimutė Matkevičienė	59. Kaišiadorių-Elektrėnų	Lithuanian Farmers and Greens Union	
Antanas Matulas	47. Pasvalio-Pakruojo	Homeland Union	
Andrius Mazuronis	Nationwide	Independent	From 9 April 2019
Kęstutis Mažeika	63. Sūduvos	Lithuanian Farmers and Greens Union	
Rūta Miliūtė	Nationwide	Lithuanian Farmers and Greens Union	
Radvilė Morkūnaitė-Mikulėnienė	Nationwide	Homeland Union	
Jaroslav Narkevič	Nationwide	Electoral Action of Poles in Lithuania	
Alfredas Stasys Nausėda	32. Šilutės	Lithuanian Farmers and Greens Union	
Andrius Navickas	Nationwide	Homeland Union	From 15 June 2017
Monika Navickienė	10. Naujosios Vilnios	Homeland Union	
Arvydas Nekrošius	42. Raseinių-Kėdainių	Lithuanian Farmers and Greens Union	
Petras Nevulis	Nationwide	Lithuanian Farmers and Greens Union	
Aušrinė Norkienė	34. Tauragės	Lithuanian Farmers and Greens Union	
Juozas Olekas	Nationwide	Social Democratic Party of Lithuania	Until 1 July 2019
Česlav Olševski	57. Medininkų	Electoral Action of Poles in Lithuania	
Andrius Palionis	67. Prienų-Birštono	Social Democratic Party of Lithuania	
Aušra Papirtienė	15. Kalniečių	Lithuanian Farmers and Greens Union	
Žygimantas Pavilionis	1. Naujamiesčio	Homeland Union	
Virgilijus Poderys	Nationwide	Lithuanian Farmers and Greens Union	
Raminta Popovienė	Nationwide	Social Democratic Party of Lithuania	
Viktoras Pranckietis	65. Raudondvario	Lithuanian Farmers and Greens Union	
Mindaugas Puidokas	19. Aleksoto-Vilijampolės	Lithuanian Farmers and Greens Union	
Kęstutis Pūkas	Nationwide	Order and Justice	
Edmundas Pupinis	51. Utenos	Homeland Union	
Naglis Puteikis	23. Danės	Lithuanian Centre Party, Independent	
Vytautas Rastenis	Nationwide	Lithuanian Farmers and Greens Union	
Jurgis Razma	Nationwide	Homeland Union	
Juozas Rimkus	41. Kelmės-Šiaulių	Lithuanian Farmers and Greens Union	
Viktoras Rinkevičius	Nationwide	Lithuanian Farmers and Greens Union	
Irina Rozova	Nationwide	Electoral Action of Poles in Lithuania	
Julius Sabatauskas	Nationwide	Social Democratic Party of Lithuania	
Algimantas Salamakinas	Nationwide	Social Democratic Party of Lithuania	
Paulius Saudargas	7. Justiniškių	Homeland Union	
Valerijus Simulik	24. Saulės	Lithuanian Farmers and Greens Union	
Virginijus Sinkevičius	6. Šeškinės	Lithuanian Farmers and Greens Union	
Rimantas Sinkevičius	60. Jonavos	Social Democratic Party of Lithuania	
Algirdas Sysas	Nationwide	Social Democratic Party of Lithuania	
Gintarė Skaistė	Nationwide	Homeland Union	
Artūras Skardžius	Nationwide	Social Democratic Party of Lithuania	
Saulius Skvernelis	8. Karoliniškių	Lithuanian Farmers and Greens Union	
Kęstutis Smirnovas	68. Vilkaviškio	Lithuanian Farmers and Greens Union	
Lauras Stacevičius	16. Dainavos	Lithuanian Farmers and Greens Union	
Andriejus Stančikas	Nationwide	Lithuanian Farmers and Greens Union	
Levutė Staniuvienė	37. Kuršo	Lithuanian Farmers and Greens Union	
Kazys Starkevičius	Nationwide	Homeland Union	
Gintaras Steponavičius	Nationwide	Liberal Movement	
Zenonas Streikus	71. Lazdijų-Druskininkų	Lithuanian Farmers and Greens Union	
Algis Strelčiūnas	9. Lazdynų	Homeland Union	
Dovilė Šakalienė	Nationwide	Lithuanian Farmers and Greens Union	
Rimantė Šalaševičiūtė	Nationwide	Social Democratic Party of Lithuania	
Robertas Šarknickas	30. Alytaus	Lithuanian Farmers and Greens Union	
Stasys Šedbaras	Nationwide	Homeland Union	
Irena Šiaulienė	Nationwide	Social Democratic Party of Lithuania	
Audrys Šimas	48. Biržų-Kupiškio	Lithuanian Farmers and Greens Union	
Ingrida Šimonytė	3. Antakalnio	Homeland Union	
Agnė Širinskienė	Nationwide	Lithuanian Farmers and Greens Union	
Leonard Talmont	56. Šalčininkų-Vilniaus	Electoral Action of Poles in Lithuania	
Rita Tamašunienė	55. Nemenčinės	Electoral Action of Poles in Lithuania	
Tomas Tomilinas	Nationwide	Lithuanian Farmers and Greens Union	
Stasys Tumėnas	25. Aušros	Lithuanian Farmers and Greens Union	
Povilas Urbšys	27. Vakarinė	Independent	
Gintaras Vaičekauskas	22. Pajūrio	Liberal Movement	
Ona Valiukevičiūtė	Nationwide	Order and Justice	From 10 March 2018
Petras Valiūnas	69. Dzūkijos	Lithuanian Farmers and Greens Union	
Egidijus Vareikis	Nationwide	Lithuanian Farmers and Greens Union	
Jonas Varkalys	35. Plungės	Liberal Movement	
Juozas Varžgalys	61. Ukmergės	Lithuanian Farmers and Greens Union	
Gediminas Vasiliauskas	17. Petrašiūnų	Lithuanian Farmers and Greens Union	
Aurelijus Veryga	18. Panemunės	Lithuanian Farmers and Greens Union	
Virginija Vingrienė	Nationwide	Lithuanian Farmers and Greens Union	
Antanas Vinkus	36. Kretingos-Palangos	Social Democratic Party of Lithuania	
Emanuelis Zingeris	Nationwide	Homeland Union	
Remigijus Žemaitaitis	33. Pietų Žemaitijos	Order and Justice	
Rokas Žilinskas	Nationwide	Homeland Union	Until 13 June 2017
