= Thirteenth Seimas =

Thirteenth Seimas of Lithuania
←	Twelfth Seimas of Lithuania	Fourteenth Seimas of Lithuania	→
- Seimas Palace

Overview
- Legislative body: Seimas
- Jurisdiction: Lithuania
- Term: 2020—2024

The Thirteenth Seimas of Lithuania is a parliament (Seimas) in Lithuania. Elections took place on 11 October 2020, with the run-off on 25 October. The Seimas commenced its work on 13 November 2020 and is serving a four-year term.

== Elections ==
In the elections in 2020, 70 members of the parliament were elected on proportional party lists and 71 in single member constituencies. Elections took place on 11 October 2020. Run-off elections were held on 25 October in the single-seat constituencies where no candidate secured a seat in the first round.

Party	Nationwide constituency			Single-member constituencies						Total seats	+/–
Party	Nationwide constituency			First round			Second round			Total seats	+/–
Party	Votes	% (Note: Percentage share of valid votes; Lithuanian Central Electoral Committee present figures including both valid and invalid votes.)	Seats	Votes	%	Seats	Votes	%	Seats	Total seats	+/–
Homeland Union – Lithuanian Christian Democrats	292,068	25.77	23	267,976	24.21	1	352,566	40.21	26	50	+19
Lithuanian Farmers and Greens Union	204,780	18.07	16	169,551	15.32	0	209,714	23.92	16	32	−22
Labour Party	110,780	9.77	9	88,083	7.96	0	8,077	0.92	1	10	+8
Social Democratic Party of Lithuania	108,641	9.59	8	130,559	11.79	0	75,560	8.62	5	13	−4
Freedom Party	107,057	9.45	8	69,740	6.30	0	68,630	7.83	3	11	New
Liberal Movement	79,742	7.04	6	102,586	9.27	0	57,671	6.58	7	13	−1
Electoral Action of Poles in Lithuania – Christian Families Alliance	56,382	4.97	0	52,905	4.78	2	14,835	1.69	1	3	−5
Social Democratic Labour Party of Lithuania	37,198	3.28	0	51,229	4.63	0	26,198	2.99	3	3	New
Centre Party – Nationalists	26,767	2.36	0	20,474	1.85	0	5,405	0.62	0	0	−1
National Alliance	25,092	2.21	0	14,938	1.35	0	–	–	–	0	New
Freedom and Justice	23,350	2.06	0	28,568	2.58	0	9,631	1.10	1	1	New
Lithuanian Green Party	19,307	1.70	0	35,174	3.18	0	6,648	0.76	1	1	±0
The Way of Courage	13,337	1.18	0	2,573	0.23	0	–	–	–	0	±0
Lithuania – For everyone	11,351	1.00	0	7,692	0.69	0	–	–	–	0	New
Christian Union	8,833	0.78	0	17,360	1.57	0	–	–	–	0	New
Union of Intergenerational Solidarity – Cohesion for Lithuania	5,807	0.51	0	2,753	0.23	0	–	–	–	0	New
Lithuanian People's Party	2,950	0.26	0	1,087	0.10	0	–	–	–	0	±0
Independents	–	–	–	43,756	3.95	0	41,936	4.78	4	4	±0
Invalid/blank votes	41,401	–	–	61,585	–	–	36,535				
Total	1,174,843	100	70	1,168,350	100	3	917,720	100	68	141	±0
Registered voters/turnout	2,457,722	47.80	–	2,457,722	47.54	–	2,355,726	38.96			
Source: Central Electoral Commission

== Activities ==
Viktorija Čmilytė-Nielsen was elected as the Speaker of the Thirteenth Seimas.

The Thirteenth Seimas was marked by the COVID-19 pandemic. It affected the parliament's work (e.g. from 26 November 2020 until 3 December 2020, plenary sessions were suspended and since 12 January 2021, plenary sessions are taking place remotely).

== Composition ==
=== Parliamentary groups ===
After the elections, the parliamentary groups were formed in the Seimas, largely on the party lines: Political Group of Democrats ‘For Lithuania’(DFVL), Freedom Party (LF), Homeland Union - Lithuanian Christian Democrats (TSLKDF), Labour Party (DPF), Liberal Movement (LSF), Lithuanian Farmers and Greens Union (LVŽSF), Lithuanian Regions Political Group (LRF), Mixed Group (MSNG) and Social Democratic Party of Lithuania (LSDPF).

Name	Abbr.	Members
Homeland Union	TSLKDF	49
Lithuanian Farmers and Greens Union	LVŽSF	17
Democrats ‘For Lithuania’	DFVL	16
Social Democratic Party of Lithuania	LSDPF	14
Liberal Movement	LSF	12
Freedom Party	LF	10
Lithuanian Regions Party	LRPF	9
Mixed Group	MSNG	10
Speaker of the Seimas	-	1

=== Members ===
145 members have served in the Thirteenth Seimas.

Name, Surname	Constituency	Electoral list	Notes
Kasparas Adomaitis	Multi-member	Freedom Party	
Virgilijus Alekna	Multi-member	Liberal Movement	
Vilija Aleknaitė-Abramikienė	Multi-member	Homeland Union - Lithuanian Christian Democrats	
Laima Liucija Andrikienė	Multi-member	Homeland Union - Lithuanian Christian Democrats	
Arvydas Anušauskas	15. Kalniečių	Homeland Union - Lithuanian Christian Democrats	
Aušrinė Armonaitė	71. Pasaulio lietuvių	Freedom Party	
Dalia Asanavičiūtė	Multi-member	Homeland Union - Lithuanian Christian Democrats	
Audronius Ažubalis	Multi-member	Homeland Union - Lithuanian Christian Democrats	
Valius Ąžuolas	39. Žemaitijos šiaurinė	Lithuanian Farmers and Greens Union	
Andrius Bagdonas	Multi-member	Liberal Movement	
Vytautas Bakas	30. Alytaus	Independent	
Zigmantas Balčytis	32. Šilutės	Social Democratic Labour Party of Lithuania	
Kristijonas Bartoševičius	Multi-member	Homeland Union - Lithuanian Christian Democrats	
Rima Baškienė	45. Šiaulių krašto	Lithuanian Farmers and Greens Union	
Juozas Baublys	69. Dzūkijos	Liberal Movement	
Tomas Bičiūnas	43. Kėdainių	Social Democratic Party of Lithuania	
Agnė Bilotaitė	11. Panerių–Grigiškių	Homeland Union - Lithuanian Christian Democrats	
Rasa Budbergytė	Multi-member	Social Democratic Party of Lithuania	
Valentinas Bukauskas	40. Telšių	Labour Party	
Guoda Burokienė	33. Aukštaitijos	Lithuanian Farmers and Greens Union	
Algirdas Butkevičius	68. Vilkaviškio	Lithuanian Green Party	
Antanas Čepononis	44. Radviliškio–Tytuvėnų	Homeland Union - Lithuanian Christian Democrats	
Viktorija Čmilytė-Nielsen	1. Senamiesčio–Žvėryno	Liberal Movement	
Morgana Danielė	Multi-member	Freedom Party	
Evelina Dobravolska	Multi-member	Freedom Party	
Algimantas Dumbrava	52. Nalšios šiaurinė	Lithuanian Farmers and Greens Union	
Justas Džiugelis	Multi-member	Homeland Union - Lithuanian Christian Democrats	
Viktoras Fiodorovas	Multi-member	Labour Party	
Dainius Gaižauskas	Multi-member	Lithuanian Farmers and Greens Union	
Vytautas Gapšys	Multi-member	Labour Party	
Aidas Gedvilas	Multi-member	Labour Party	
Aistė Gedvilienė	5. Fabijoniškių	Homeland Union - Lithuanian Christian Democrats	
Simonas Gentvilas	22. Pajūrio	Liberal Movement	
Eugenijus Gentvilas	Multi-member	Liberal Movement	
Vaida Giraitytė	Multi-member	Labour Party	
Ligita Girskienė	21. Marių	Lithuanian Farmers and Greens Union	
Kęstutis Glaveckas	Multi-member	Liberal Movement	Until 30 April 2021
Petras Gražulis	31. Gargždų	Independent	Until 18 December 2023
Domas Griškevičius	26. Saulės	Independent	
Jonas Gudauskas	Multi-member	Homeland Union - Lithuanian Christian Democrats	
Antanas Guoga	Multi-member	Labour Party	Until 19 February 2021
Irena Haase	Multi-member	Homeland Union - Lithuanian Christian Democrats	
Jonas Jarutis	Multi-member	Lithuanian Farmers and Greens Union	
Liudas Jonaitis	46. Žiemgalos vakarinė	Social Democratic Party of Lithuania	
Linas Jonauskas	Multi-member	Social Democratic Party of Lithuania	
Sergejus Jovaiša	Multi-member	Homeland Union - Lithuanian Christian Democrats	
Eugenijus Jovaiša	Multi-member	Lithuanian Farmers and Greens Union	
Vigilijus Jukna	Multi-member	Labour Party	
Vytautas Juozapaitis	19. Aleksoto–Vilijampolės	Homeland Union - Lithuanian Christian Democrats	
Ričardas Juška	62. Karšuvos	Liberal Movement	
Ieva Kačinskaitė-Urbonienė	Multi-member	Labour Party	
Vidmantas Kanopa	50. Sėlos rytinė	Social Democratic Party of Lithuania	
Ramūnas Karbauskis	Multi-member	Lithuanian Farmers and Greens Union	Until 24 November 2020
Laurynas Kasčiūnas	Multi-member	Homeland Union - Lithuanian Christian Democrats	
Dainius Kepenis	Multi-member	Lithuanian Farmers and Greens Union	
Vytautas Kernagis	13. Pašilaičių	Homeland Union - Lithuanian Christian Democrats	
Gintautas Kindurys	53. Nalšios pietinė	Lithuanian Farmers and Greens Union	
Dainius Kreivys	12. Verkių	Homeland Union - Lithuanian Christian Democrats	
Asta Kubilienė	Multi-member	Lithuanian Farmers and Greens Union	From 26 November 2020
Linas Kukuraitis	Multi-member	Lithuanian Farmers and Greens Union	
Andrius Kupčinskas	Multi-member	Homeland Union - Lithuanian Christian Democrats	
Paulė Kuzmickienė	4. Žirmūnų	Homeland Union - Lithuanian Christian Democrats	
Deividas Labanavičius	27. Panevėžio vakarinė	Lithuanian Farmers and Greens Union	
Gabrielius Landsbergis	20. Centro–Žaliakalnio	Homeland Union - Lithuanian Christian Democrats	
Orinta Leiputė	Multi-member	Social Democratic Party of Lithuania	
Silva Lengvinienė	59. Kaišiadorių–Elektrėnų	Freedom Party	
Arminas Lydeka	Multi-member	Liberal Movement	
Mindaugas Lingė	6. Šeškinės–Šnipiškių	Homeland Union - Lithuanian Christian Democrats	
Raimundas Lopata	Multi-member	Liberal Movement	
Mykolas Majauskas	Multi-member	Homeland Union - Lithuanian Christian Democrats	
Matas Maldeikis	Multi-member	Homeland Union - Lithuanian Christian Democrats	
Kęstutis Masiulis	Multi-member	Homeland Union - Lithuanian Christian Democrats	
Bronislovas Matelis	28. Nevėžio	Homeland Union - Lithuanian Christian Democrats	
Marius Matijošaitis	16. Savanorių	Freedom Party	
Antanas Matulas	47. Žiemgalos rytinė	Homeland Union - Lithuanian Christian Democrats	
Andrius Mazuronis	Multi-member	Labour Party	
Kęstutis Mažeika	63. Sūduvos pietinė	Lithuanian Farmers and Greens Union	
Rūta Miiūtė	Multi-member	Lithuanian Farmers and Greens Union	
Vytautas Mitalas	Multi-member	Freedom Party	
Laima Mogenienė	Multi-member	Lithuanian Farmers and Greens Union	
Radvilė Morkūnaitė-Mikulėnienė	8. Pilaitės–Karoliniškių	Homeland Union - Lithuanian Christian Democrats	
Laima Nagienė	38. Mažeikių	Lithuanian Farmers and Greens Union	
Andrius Navickas	Multi-member	Homeland Union - Lithuanian Christian Democrats	
Monika Navickienė	10. Naujosios Vilnios	Homeland Union - Lithuanian Christian Democrats	
Arvydas Nekrošius	42. Raseinių–Kėdainių	Lithuanian Farmers and Greens Union	Until 19 April 2023
Aušrinė Norkienė	Multi-member	Lithuanian Farmers and Greens Union	
Česlav Olševski	57. Medininkų	Electoral Action of Poles in Lithuania – Christian Families Alliance	
Monika Ošmianskienė	Multi-member	Freedom Party	
Ieva Pakarklytė	Multi-member	Freedom Party	
Andrius Palionis	67. Dainavos	Social Democratic Labour Party of Lithuania	
Gintautas Paluckas	Multi-member	Social Democratic Party of Lithuania	
Žygimantas Pavilionis	2. Naujamiesčio–Naujininkų	Homeland Union - Lithuanian Christian Democrats	
Beata Petkevič	56. Šalčininkų–Vilniaus	Electoral Action of Poles in Lithuania – Christian Families Alliance	
Audrius Petrošius	24. Baltijos	Homeland Union - Lithuanian Christian Democrats	
Jonas Pinskus	54. Molėtų–Širvintų	Social Democratic Labour Party of Lithuania	
Liuda Pociūnienė	Multi-member	Homeland Union - Lithuanian Christian Democrats	
Arvydas Pocius	23. Danės	Homeland Union - Lithuanian Christian Democrats	
Viktoras Pranckietis	65. Raudondvario	Liberal Movement	
Mindaugas Puidokas	Multi-member	Labour Party	
Edmundas Pupinis	51. Utenos	Homeland Union - Lithuanian Christian Democrats	
Valdas Rakutis	Multi-member	Homeland Union - Lithuanian Christian Democrats	
Tomas Vytautas Raskevičius	Multi-member	Freedom Party	
Jurgis Razma	Multi-member	Homeland Union - Lithuanian Christian Democrats	
Edita Rudelienė	Multi-member	Liberal Movement	From 11 May 2021
Julius Sabatauskas	Multi-member	Social Democratic Party of Lithuania	
Eugenijus Sabutis	60. Jonavos	Social Democratic Party of Lithuania	
Paulius Saudargas	7. Justiniškių–Viršuliškių	Homeland Union - Lithuanian Christian Democrats	
Lukas Savickas	Multi-member	Lithuanian Farmers and Greens Union	
Jurgita Sejonienė	Multi-member	Homeland Union - Lithuanian Christian Democrats	
Algirdas Sysas	Multi-member	Social Democratic Party of Lithuania	
Gintarė Skaistė	18. Panemunės	Homeland Union - Lithuanian Christian Democrats	
Artūras Skardžius	Multi-member	Labour Party	From 10 March 2021
Mindaugas Skritulskas	36. Mėguvos	Homeland Union - Lithuanian Christian Democrats	
Saulius Skvernelis	Multi-member	Lithuanian Farmers and Greens Union	
Linas Slušnys	Multi-member	Homeland Union - Lithuanian Christian Democrats	
Kazys Starkevičius	17. Petrašiūnų–Gričiupio	Homeland Union - Lithuanian Christian Democrats	
Algirdas Stončaitis	Multi-member	Lithuanian Farmers and Greens Union	
Zenonas Streikus	70. Jotvingių	Lithuanian Farmers and Greens Union	
Algis Strelčiūnas	9. Lazdynų	Homeland Union - Lithuanian Christian Democrats	
Giedrius Surplys	64. Sūduvos šiaurinė	Lithuanian Farmers and Greens Union	
Dovilė Šakalienė	Multi-member	Social Democratic Party of Lithuania	
Rimantė Šalaševičiūtė	Multi-member	Lithuanian Farmers and Greens Union	
Robertas Šarknickas	Multi-member	Lithuanian Farmers and Greens Union	
Stasys Šedbaras	Multi-member	Homeland Union - Lithuanian Christian Democrats	
Ingrida Šimonytė	3. Antakalnio	Homeland Union - Lithuanian Christian Democrats	
Agnė Širinskienė	Multi-member	Lithuanian Farmers and Greens Union	
Jurgita Šiugždinienė	14. Šilainių	Homeland Union - Lithuanian Christian Democrats	
Rita Tamašunienė	55. Nemenčinės	Electoral Action of Poles in Lithuania – Christian Families Alliance	
Vilija Targamadzė	Multi-member	Social Democratic Party of Lithuania	
Tomas Tomilinas	49. Deltuvos šiaurinė	Lithuanian Farmers and Greens Union	
Stasys Tumėnas	25. Aušros	Lithuanian Farmers and Greens Union	
Justinas Urbanavičius	66. Garliavos	Homeland Union - Lithuanian Christian Democrats	
Romualdas Vaitkus	34. Tauragės	Liberal Movement	
Arūnas Valinskas	Multi-member	Homeland Union - Lithuanian Christian Democrats	
Valdemaras Valkiūnas	48. Sėlos vakarinė	Independent	
Jonas Varkalys	35. Plungės–Rietavo	Liberal Movement	
Juozas Varžgalys	61. Deltuvos pietinė	Lithuanian Farmers and Greens Union	
Aurelijus Veryga	Multi-member	Lithuanian Farmers and Greens Union	
Kęstutis Vilkauskas	58. Trakų–Vievio	Social Democratic Party of Lithuania	
Antanas Vinkus	37. Kuršo	Lithuanian Farmers and Greens Union	
Andrius Vyšniauskas	29. Marijampolės	Homeland Union - Lithuanian Christian Democrats	
Emanuelis Zingeris	Multi-member	Homeland Union - Lithuanian Christian Democrats	
Remigijus Žemaitaitis	41. Kelmės–Šilalės	Freedom and Justice	
Artūras Žukauskas	Multi-member	Freedom Party	
