= 2015 Homeland Union – Lithuanian Christian Democrats leadership election =

- 17–19 April 2015 and 24–25 April 2015
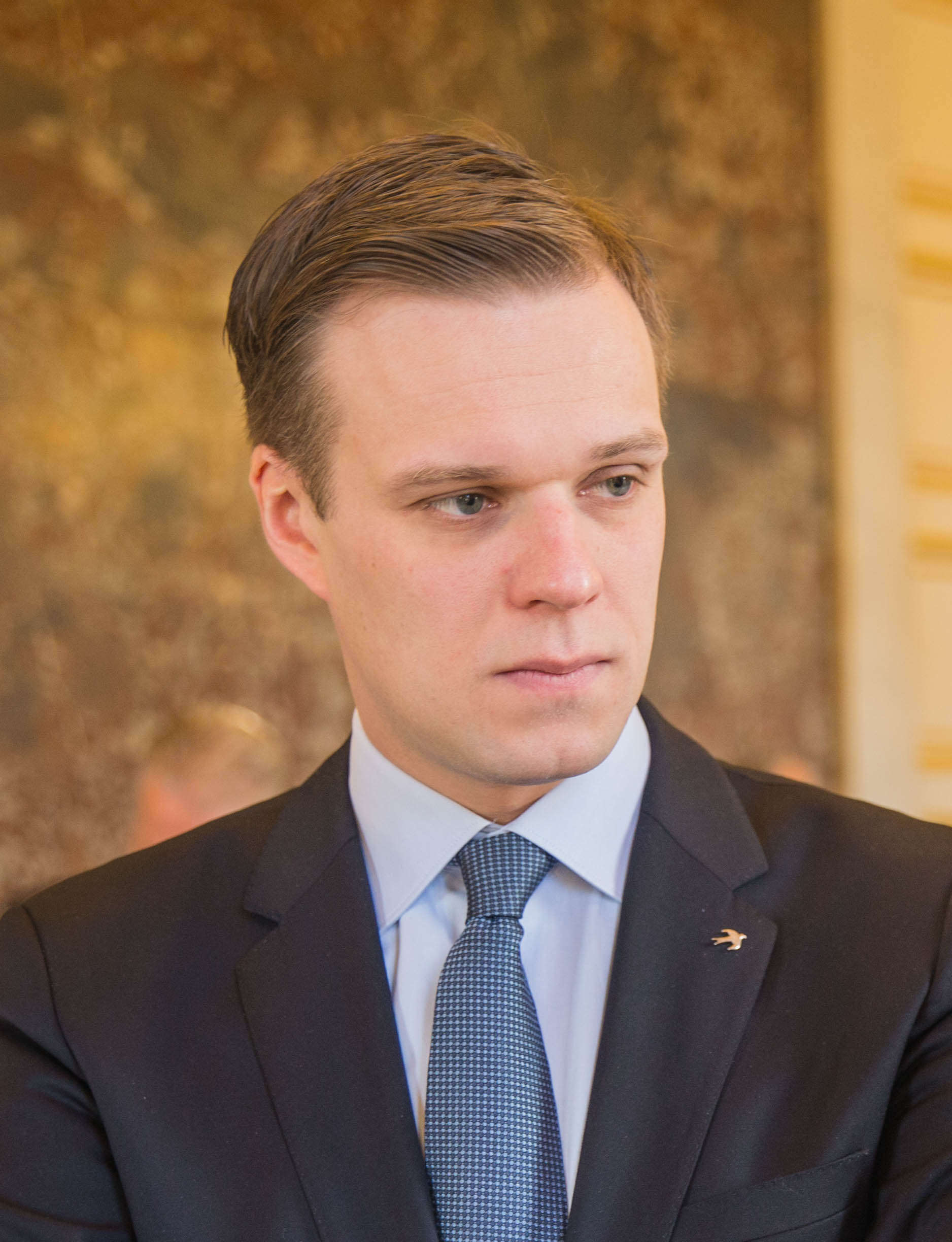

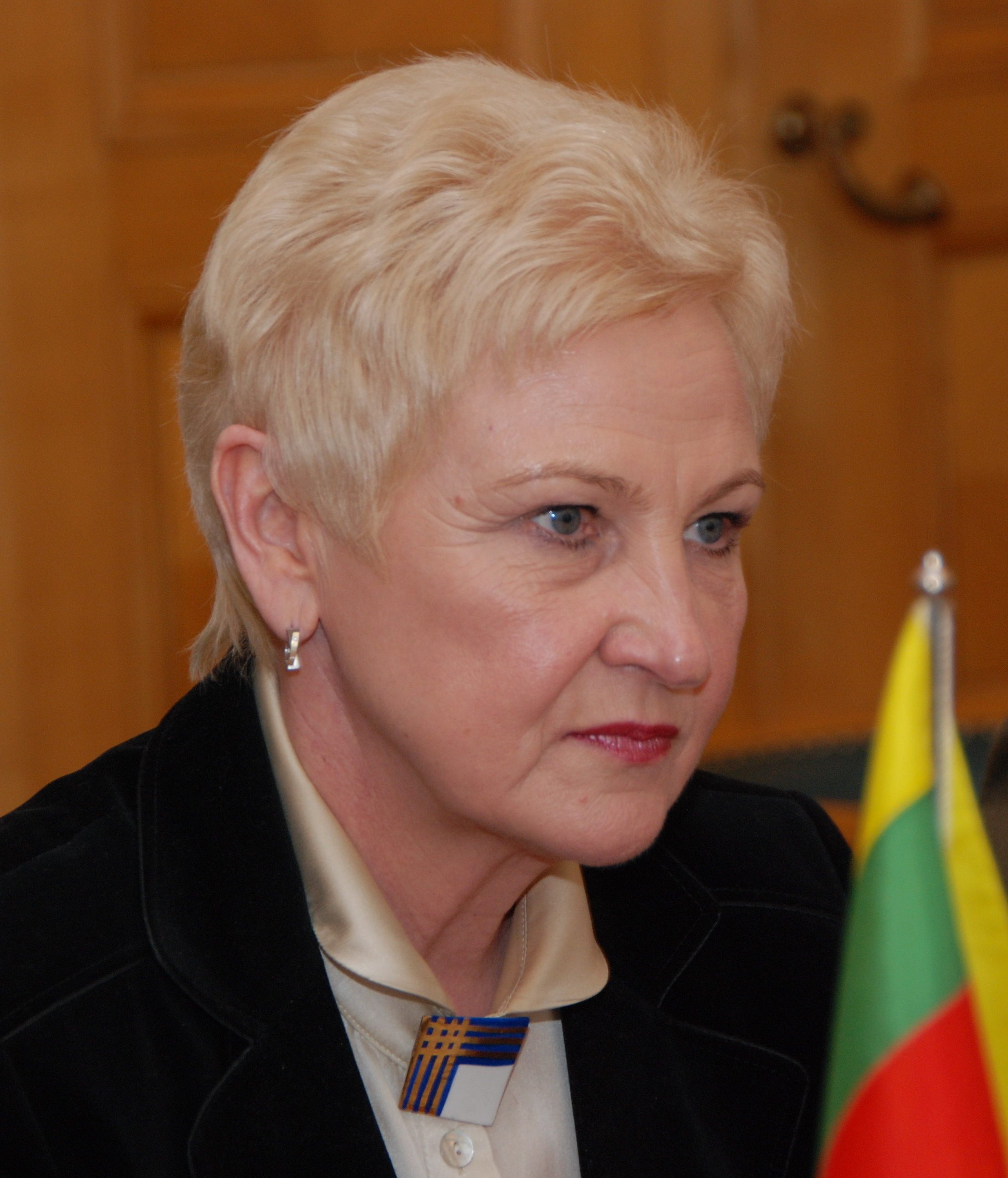
Nominee	Gabrielius Landsbergis	Irena Degutienė
Popular vote	5,192	4,094
Percentage	55.91%	44.09%
Leader before election
Andrius Kubilius
Elected Leader
Gabrielius Landsbergis

2015 Homeland Union – Lithuanian Christian Democrats leadership election determined the leader of the Homeland Union – Lithuanian Christian Democrats, who will stand as candidate for the office of Prime Minister in the subsequent parliamentary election, which took place on 9 October 2016 and 23 October 2016.

== Candidates ==
Andrius Kubilius, which had led the party since 2003, in March 2015 (after municipal councils elections) announced that he will not stand for leadership election.

=== Declared ===
Candidate	Political office
Gabrielius Landsbergis	Member of the European Parliament (2014–2016)
Irena Degutienė	Member of the Seimas (1996–2020); Minister of Social Security and Labour (1996–2000); Acting Prime Minister of Lithuania (1999); First Deputy Speaker of the Seimas (2008–2009); Speaker of the Seimas (2009–2012)
Jurgis Razma	Member of the Seimas (1996–present)
Mantas Adomėnas	Member of the Seimas (2008–2020)
Laima Andrikienė	Member of Reconstituent Seimas (1990–1992); Member of the Seimas (1992–2000, 2020–present); Minister of Industry and Trade, and of European Affairs (1996); Member of the European Parliament (2004–2014, 2016–2019)
Emanuelis Zingeris	Signatory of the 1990 Act of the Re-Establishment of the State of Lithuania; Member of the Seimas (1990–2000, 2004–present); Vice President of the Parliamentary Assembly of the Council of Europe (2009–present); President of the Parliamentary Forum of the Community of Democracies (2010–present)

=== Withdrawn ===
These candidates announced their withdrawal:

- Agnė Bilotaitė, Member of the Seimas (2008–present)
- Kazys Starkevičius, Member of the Seimas (2004–2026), Minister of Agriculture (2008–2012)
- Vytautas Juozapaitis, soloist, Member of the Seimas (2012–present)

== Results ==
Gabrielius Landsbergis became party's leader and led party to the Seimas elections of 2016, in which the party achieved its best result since 1996.

Candidates (party membership)	First round		Second round	
Candidates (party membership)	Votes	%	Votes	%
Gabrielius Landsbergis	4,526	49.77	5,192	55.91
Irena Degutienė	3,919	43.10	4,094	44.09
Jurgis Razma	≈231	0.03		
Mantas Adomėnas	≈212	0.02		
Laima Andrikienė	≈182	0.02		
Emanuelis Zingeris	≈27	0.003		
Total	9,093	100	9,286	100
Registered voters/turnout	16,054	56.64	16,054	57.84
Source: VZ.lt, ELTA, VE.lt, DELFI.lt
