= Lithuanian Christian Democrats =

Political party

Lithuanian Christian Democrats Lietuvos krikščionys demokratai
- Abbreviation: LKD
- Chairman: Paulius Saudargas
- Vice Chairman: Laurynas Kasčiūnas
- Founder: Kazys Bobelis
- Founded: 12 May 2001; 25 years ago
- Merger of: Christian Democratic Union; Lithuanian Christian Democratic Party
- Merged into: Homeland Union
- Youth wing: Young Christian Democrats
- Membership: ~4500
- Ideology: Christian Democracy
- Political position: Centre-right
- Colours: Orange

The Lithuanian Christian Democrats (Lithuanian: Lietuvos krikščionys demokratai, LKD) was a Christian-democratic political party in Lithuania, which currently exists as a faction in TS-LKD. The party was a member of the European People's Party (EPP) and the European Christian Political Party.

== History ==
The LKD was established in 2001 by a merger of the Christian Democratic Union and the Lithuanian Christian Democratic Party, which between them held three seats in the Seimas. A faction opposed to the merger formed a new party, the Lithuanian Christian Democracy Party (Lietuvos krikščioniškosios demokratijos partija), chaired by Zigmas Zinkevičius.

The 2004 elections saw the new party receive just 1.4% of the vote, and lose its parliamentary representation. On 17 May 2008, the LKD merged with the Homeland Union, which was renamed to Homeland Union - Lithuanian Christian Democrats as a result.

== Platform ==
According to the Lithuanian Christian Democrat 2001 election programme, the party's primary objectives include increasing welfare spending, strengthening social security and healthcare systems based on social market economy principles and fostering societal education based on Christian values. The LKD emphasized the importance of Lithuania's membership in the European Union and NATO as fundamental guarantees for the country's security.
