= Vagnorius Cabinet II =

- 1996–1999
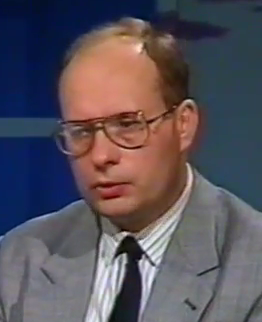
- Date formed: 10 December 1996
- Date dissolved: 4 May 1999

People and organisations
- Head of state: Algirdas Brazauskas (1996–1998); Valdas Adamkus (1998–1999)
- Head of government: Gediminas Vagnorius
- Member parties: Homeland Union, Lithuanian Christian Democratic Party, Lithuanian Centre Union, Democratic Labour Party of Lithuania (1998–1999)
- Status in legislature: Majority coalition government
- Opposition parties: Democratic Labour Party of Lithuania (1996–1998), Social Democratic Party of Lithuania
- Opposition leader: None

History
- Legislature term: Seventh Seimas
- Predecessor: Stankevičius Cabinet
- Successor: Paksas Cabinet I

The Second Vagnorius Cabinet was the 8th cabinet of Lithuania since 1990. It consisted of the Prime Minister and 17 government ministers.

== History ==
Gediminas Vagnorius was appointed the Prime Minister by President Algirdas Brazauskas on 4 December 1996, after the Homeland Union decisively won the elections in October. It was the second time Vagnorius was appointed the Prime Minister, having previously led the 3rd government between 1991 and 1992. The government received its mandate and started its work on 10 December 1996, after the Seimas gave assent to its program.

In 1998, number of ministries (and ministers) was reduced from 17 to 14. Ministry of Industry and Trade, the Ministry of Energy and the Ministry of Economy were merged into the Ministry of Economy, the Ministry of Construction and Urbanistics, the Ministry of Environmental Protection and the Ministry of Forestry were merged into Ministry of Environment.

The government served for almost three years before resigning on 4 May 1999 amid criticism of its response to the 1998 Russian financial crisis and disagreements between Vagnorius and Vytautas Landsbergis, the leader of the Homeland Union. The government continued to serve in an acting capacity (with Irena Degutienė as the acting Prime Minister), until the new Homeland Union government headed by Rolandas Paksas started its work on 10 June 1999.

== Cabinet ==
The following ministers served on the Second Vagnorius Cabinet.

Position	Name	From	To
Prime Minister	Gediminas Vagnorius	10 December 1996	4 May 1999
Ministry of Agriculture (Note: On 19 December 1996, the Ministry of Agriculture was renamed to Ministry of Agriculture and Forestry. The name was changed back on 6 May 1998. Makelis remained the minister throughout.)	Edvardas Makelis	10 December 1996	10 June 1999
Ministry of Culture	Saulius Šaltenis	10 December 1996	10 June 1999
Ministry of Economy (Note: The old Ministry of Economy (Ekonomikos ministerija), headed by Babilius, as well as the Ministry of Forestry, the Ministry of Industry and Trade and the Ministry of Energy were replaced by the new Ministry of Economy (Ūkio ministerija) also headed by Babilius.)	Vincas Babilius	10 December 1996	10 June 1999
Ministry of Education and Science	Zigmas Zinkevičius	10 December 1996	1 May 1998
Ministry of Education and Science	Kornelijus Platelis	1 May 1998	10 June 1999
Ministry of Environment (Note: The Ministry of Environment was known as the Ministry of Environmental Protection before 6 May 1998.)	Imantas Lazdinis	10 December 1996	
Ministry of Environment	Algis Čaplikas	25 March 1998	5 March 1999
Ministry of Environment	Danius Lygis	8 April 1999	10 June 1999
Ministry of Finance	Rolandas Matiliauskas	10 December 1996	3 February 1997
Ministry of Finance	Algirdas Šemeta	19 February 1997	10 June 1999
Ministry of Foreign Affairs	Algirdas Saudargas	10 December 1996	10 June 1999
Ministry of Health	Juozas Galdikas	10 December 1996	25 March 1998
Ministry of Health	Laurynas Stankevičius	25 March 1998	10 June 1999
Ministry of the Interior	Vidmantas Žiemelis	10 December 1996	21 May 1998
Ministry of the Interior	Stasys Šedbaras	22 May 1998	10 June 1999
Ministry of Justice	Vytautas Pakalniškis	10 December 1996	10 June 1999
Ministry of Defence	Česlovas Vytautas Stankevičius	10 December 1996	10 June 1999
Ministry of Social Security and Labour	Irena Degutienė	10 December 1996	10 June 1999
Ministry of Transport and Communications	Algis Žvaliauskas	10 December 1996	25 November 1998
Ministry of Transport and Communications	Rimantas Didžiokas	6 January 1999	10 June 1999
Ministry of Government Reforms and Municipalities	Kęstutis Skrebys	10 December 1996	10 June 1999
Ministry of Industry and Trade (Note: The Ministry of Industry and Trade was merged into the Ministry of Economy in December 1996.)	Laima Andrikienė	10 December 1996	19 December 1996
Ministry of European Affairs (Note: The Ministry of European Affairs was newly established in December 1996 and disestablished in June 1998.)	Laima Andrikienė	19 December 1996	25 March 1998
Ministry of Communication and Informatics (Note: Ministry of Communication and Informatics was reorganized into the Communication and Informatics department of the Ministry of Government Reforms and Municipalities (later merged into the Ministry of the Interior) in 1998.)	Rimantas Pleikys	10 December 1996	25 March 1998
Ministry of Construction and Urbanistics (Note: Ministry of Construction and Urbanistics was dissolved in 1998 with its functions assumed by the Ministry of Environmental Protection (later - Ministry of Environment).)	Algis Čaplikas	10 December 1996	25 March 1998
