= Ministry of National Defence (Lithuania) =

Government ministry of Lithuania

- Krašto apsaugos ministerija (Lithuanian)

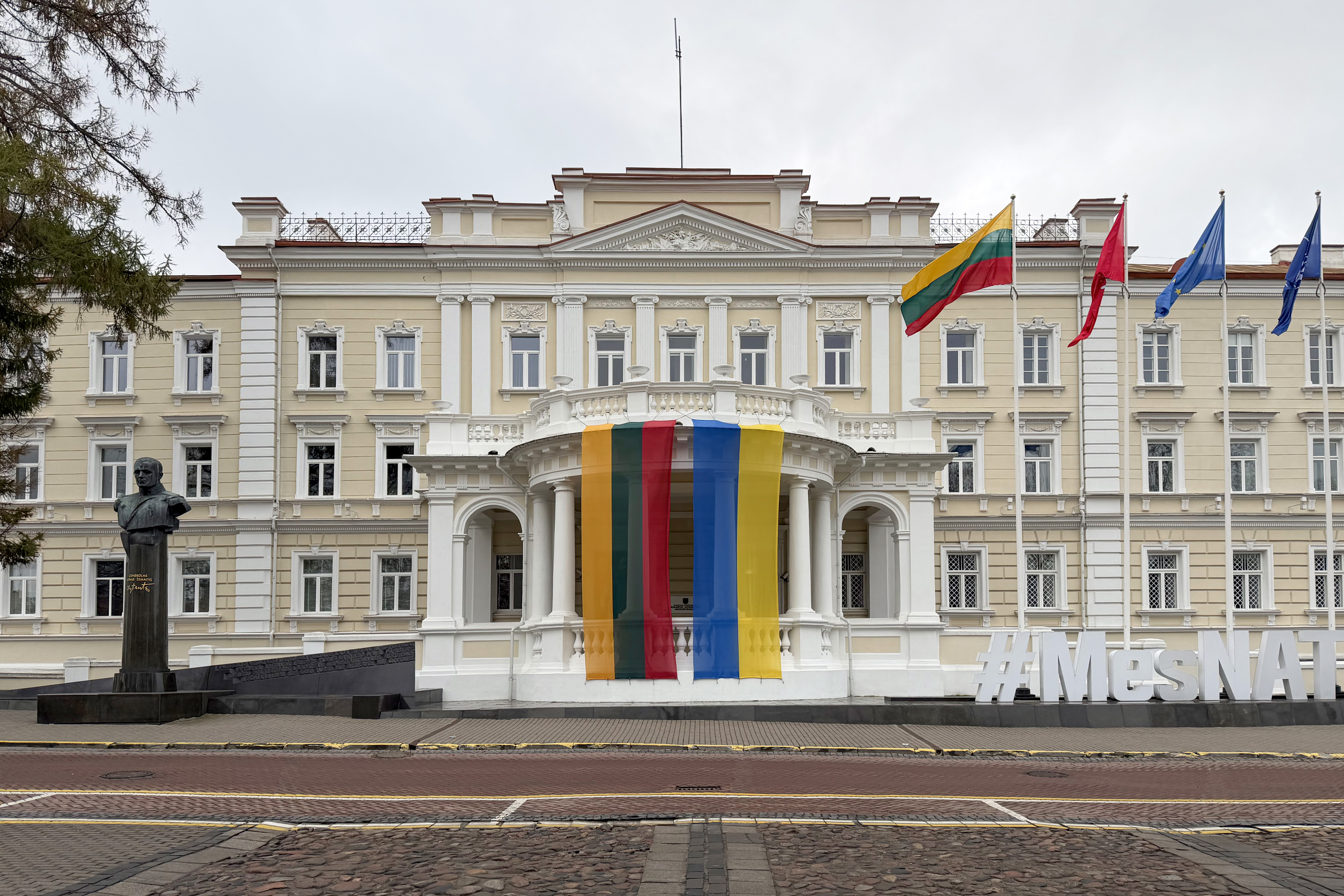

Ministry overview
- Formed: 11 November 1918; 107 years ago
- Jurisdiction: Government of Lithuania
- Headquarters: Totorių 25, Senamiestis, 01121 Vilnius
- Annual budget: ▲€2.187 billion (2024)
- Minister responsible: Robertas Kaunas, 20th Minister for National Defence of Lithuania
- Website: kam.lt

Map
- 54°40′58.3″N 25°16′58.1″E

The Ministry of National Defence of the Republic of Lithuania (Lithuanian: Lietuvos Respublikos krašto apsaugos ministerija) is the government institution of Lithuania responsible for the organization of national defence. It was originally established in 1918 upon the independence of Lithuania and reestablished following the end of Soviet rule in 1991.

== History ==
The first cabinet ministers of the Republic of Lithuania were appointed on 11 November 1918, and the position of defence minister was initially assumed by prime minister Augustinas Voldemaras. The situation in Lithuania was tense after World War I. The first decree concerning national defence was issued on 23 November 1918, which is officially considered the day of the formation of the Lithuanian Armed Forces. On 24 December 1918, lieutenant general Mykolas Velykis became the defence minister but served for just two days; he was replaced by Jonas Vileišis. The country began mobilizing its population as soon as the defence ministry was formed, as it had to defend its sovereignty in the Lithuanian Wars of Independence (1918–1920).

Following the end of Soviet rule and the restoration of Lithuania's independence on 11 March 1990, the Lithuanian defence ministry was reestablished on 25 April 1990. The ministry celebrates 25 April annually with public ceremonies in Kaunas and Vilnius.

== Departments and services ==
- Second Operational Services Department
- General Affairs Department of the Ministry of National Defence
- Centralized Finance and Property Service of the Ministry of National Defence
- General Jonas Žemaitis Lithuanian Military Academy
- Defence Resources Agency of the Ministry of National Defence
- Information Technology Service of the Ministry of National Defence
- Infrastructure Management Agency
- Key State Telecommunications Centre
- Mobilization and Civil Resistance Department of the Ministry of National Defence
- National Cyber Security Centre
- National Coordination Centre
- Vytautas the Great War Museum
- General Povilas Plechavičius Cadet Lyceum

== Defence Materiel Agency ==
Defence Materiel Agency headquarters in Vilnius

The Defence Materiel Agency (Lithuanian: Gynybos Resursų Agentūra) is an institution under the jurisdiction of the Ministry of National Defence, and it is responsible for defence procurement and strategies.

As of 2023, about 100 people work for the Defence Materiel Agency.

In 2022, the Lithuanian Ministry of Economy and Innovation awarded the Defence Materiel Agency for "high standards in its public procurement practices".

== Leadership of the ministry ==
The leadership of the Ministry of National Defence (KAM) consists of the acting Minister of National Defence, Vladislav Kondratovič, Vice Ministers Karolis Aleksa, Tomas Godliauskas, and Orijana Mašalė, Chancellor of the Ministry Dainius Ivoškis, and the Director of Defence Policy Vaidotas Urbelis. Together, they oversee the operations, policies, and strategic direction of Lithuania's defence and security efforts.

=== Ministers ===
The Minister of National Defence (Lithuanian: Krašto apsaugos ministras) is a member of the executive branch of the Government of Lithuania. The minister is responsible for overseeing the country's defence policies, military readiness, and national security strategies. The Minister leads the ministry in ensuring the protection of Lithuania's sovereignty, coordinating defence cooperation with international allies, and managing the country's defence resources and forces. The role also involves shaping defence-related legislation and fostering strategic initiatives to address evolving security challenges. The incumbent is Robertas Kaunas, who has been serving as in that capicity since 11 November 2025.

Term	Minister	Party	Cabinet	Office		
Term	Minister	Party	Cabinet	Start date	End date	Time in office
1	Audrius Butkevičius (born 1960)	Independent	Vagnorius	13 January 1991	21 July 1992	1 year, 190 days
2	Audrius Butkevičius (born 1960)	Independent	Abišala	21 July 1992	17 December 1992	149 days
3	Audrius Butkevičius (born 1960)	Independent	Lubys	17 December 1992	31 March 1993	104 days
4	Audrius Butkevičius (born 1960)	Independent	Šleževičius	31 March 1993	28 October 1993	211 days
5	Linas Antanas Linkevičius (born 1961)	Democratic Labour Party	Šleževičius	28 October 1993	19 March 1996	2 years, 143 days
6	Linas Antanas Linkevičius (born 1961)	Democratic Labour Party	Stankevičius	19 March 1996	10 December 1996	266 days
7	Česlovas Vytautas Stankevičius (born 1937)	Homeland Union	Vagnorius	10 December 1996	10 June 1999	2 years, 182 days
8	Česlovas Vytautas Stankevičius (born 1937)	Homeland Union	Paksas	10 June 1999	11 November 1999	154 days
9	Česlovas Vytautas Stankevičius (born 1937)	Homeland Union	Kubilius	11 November 1999	9 November 2000	364 days
10	Linas Antanas Linkevičius (born 1961)	Social Democratic Party	Paksas	9 November 2000	12 July 2001	245 days
11	Linas Antanas Linkevičius (born 1961)	Social Democratic Party	Brazauskas	12 July 2001	14 December 2004	3 years, 155 days
12	Gediminas Kirkilas (1951–2024)	Social Democratic Party	Brazauskas	14 December 2004	18 July 2006	1 year, 216 days
13	Juozas Olekas (born 1955)	Social Democratic Party	Kirkilas	18 July 2006	9 December 2008	2 years, 144 days
14	Rasa Juknevičienė (born 1958)	Homeland Union	Kubilius	9 December 2008	13 December 2012	4 years, 4 days
15	Juozas Olekas (born 1955)	Social Democratic Party	Butkevičius	13 December 2012	13 December 2016	4 years, 0 days
16	Raimundas Karoblis (born 1968)	Independent	Skvernelis	13 December 2016	11 December 2020	3 years, 364 days
17	Arvydas Anušauskas (born 1963)	Homeland Union	Šimonytė	11 December 2020	13 March 2024	3 years, 93 days
18	Laurynas Kasčiūnas (born 1982)	Homeland Union	Šimonytė	13 March 2024	13 December 2024	273 days
19	Dovilė Šakalienė (born 1978)	Social Democratic Party of Lithuania	Paluckas	13 December 2024	22 October 2025	313 days
20	Robertas Kaunas (born 1985)	Social Democratic Party of Lithuania	Ruginienė	11 November 2025	Incumbent	271 days
