= Laurynas Kasčiūnas =

Lithuanian politician (born 1982)

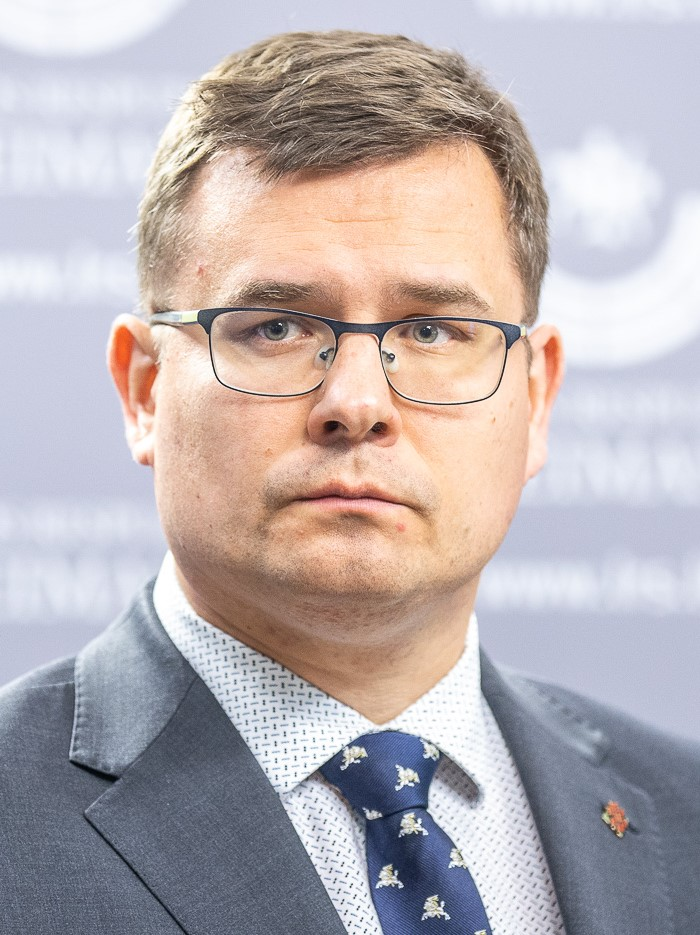
- Kasčiūnas in 2023

Chairman of the Homeland Union
- Incumbent
- Assumed office 15 March 2025
- Preceded by: Gabrielius Landsbergis; Radvilė Morkūnaitė-Mikulėnienė (acting)

Minister of National Defence
- In office 25 March 2024 – 11 December 2024
- Prime Minister: Ingrida Šimonytė
- Preceded by: Arvydas Anušauskas
- Succeeded by: Dovilė Šakalienė

Member of the Seimas
- Incumbent
- Assumed office 14 November 2024
- Preceded by: Algis Strelčiūnas
- Constituency: Lazdynai
- In office 14 November 2016 – 13 November 2024
- Constituency: Multi-member

Personal details
- Born: 8 January 1982 (age 44) Vilnius, Lithuanian SSR, Soviet Union
- Party: TS–LKD (2011–present)
- Other political affiliations: LNDP (formerly)
- Spouse: Monika Kasčiūnienė
- Children: 4
- Education: Vilnius University
- Occupation: Politician; Political analyst

Laurynas Kasčiūnas (born 8 January 1982) is a Lithuanian right-wing politician, political analyst, Member of the Seimas for the Homeland Union, and Minister of National Defence of Lithuania from 25 March 2024 to 11 December 2024, replacing Arvydas Anušauskas. He was elected chairman of Homeland Union on 9 February 2025, winning a landslide with 78% of the vote.

== Background ==
Kasčiūnas was born in the Lazdynai eldership in Vilnius in 1982 and graduated from the Ąžuolynas Progymnasium in 2000. He studied political science in Vilnius University and graduated with a Doctor of Social Science degree in 2012. From 2007 to 2016, he also lectured in the political science faculty of the university.

From 2012 to 2016, he was employed as a department manager in the Vilnius-based think tank East Europe Studies Centre. In 2016, he unsuccessfully ran for the Seimas in the southern Dzūkija (No. 69) constituency with the Homeland Union, but entered parliament via the party's list. He was reelected in 2020, and was appointed Minister of National Defence on 25 March 2024.

Kasčiūnas is a member of the youth organization Young Christian Democrats and the Ronald Reagan Freedom Centre, an association founded in collaboration with the Ronald Reagan Presidential Foundation and Institute.

== Political career ==
=== National Democratic Party ===
In 1999, at the age of 18, Kasčiūnas became the chairman of the Young National Democrats, the youth organization of the far-right National Democratic Party of Lithuania, led by Mindaugas Murza, and joined the party itself a year later, in 2000. Alongside the party, Kasčiūnas participated in protests against Lithuania's accession to the European Union and was a member of the initiative group "For Independent Lithuania" which sought to campaign for the No vote in the 2003 Lithuanian European Union membership referendum. He also promoted anti-immigration rhetoric and claimed that same-sex marriage would lead to "the extinction of nations".

In an interview with LRT, Kasčiūnas described the mood in Lithuania as "europsychosis". He later distanced himself from the party and described his membership in the LNDP as his "path of searching" during his teenage years.

=== Homeland Union ===
Kasčiūnas was the advisor to Seimas member Irena Degutienė from 2009 to 2012 and joined the Homeland Union in 2011. His past membership in the LNDP caused concern, but an investigation by the Special Investigation Service did not deem him a threat to national security. He was elected to the Seimas on the TS-LKD list in the 2016 parliamentary election. In 2016, he was among the signatories of a request to ban LGBT pride rallies in Vilnius.

In 2021, he called Remigijus Žemaitaitis a "donkey" on the parliament floor during a debate on a law on the status of foreign nationals.

Kasčiūnas was delegated as the TS-LKD candidate for chairman of the Seimas National Security and Defence Committee in 2020. He served in the position until his appointment as Minister of National Defence. The Belarus-European Union border crisis and the Lithuanian response to the Russian invasion of Ukraine in 2022 happened during his tenure. Kasčiūnas is known for his hardline anti-immigration, anti-Belarusian and anti-Russian positions. He was one of the most active supporters of turn-back policy against illegal immigration and the construction of a border barrier on the Belarus-Lithuania border. He attempted to ban the ability for Russian and Belarusian citizens to obtain Lithuanian citizenship, but his proposal was withdrawn after opposition from the rest of the coalition.

During the 2021 border crisis, he claimed:

We need to create some kind of cost system so that it doesn't pay to do it [immigrate to Lithuania]. Of course, according to international obligations, we cannot do what we fantasize about, but some restriction of freedom in the refugee center, so that they feel the costs, that they will have to sit closed for half a year and it will not be easy to go to Berlin, I think will be a good message to the people at home, the Syrian and Iraqi people that it is better not to go to Lithuania.

After Anušauskas resigned as Minister of National Defence in March 2024, Kasčiūnas was appointed by Gitanas Nausėda on 25 March 2024 and sworn in on the next day. He announced that his main tasks in his position will be to implement the principle of universal defence, prepare to receive a permanently deployed Bundeswehr brigade, pursue conscription reform and national agreement on additional funds for defense, and develop drone production capabilities.

Kasčiūnas had been named as a possible successor to Gabrielius Landsbergis as chairman of the Homeland Union, representing the right wing of the party. Alongside Paulius Saudargas, Audronius Ažubalis and Vilija Aleknaitė-Abramikienė, Kasčiūnas is considered to be a member of the party's Christian Democratic wing, which opposes the party's line on same-sex partnerships and other social questions. He was elected party chairman on 9 February 2025, winning a landslide with 78% of the vote.

== Controversies ==
=== Criticism by human rights organizations ===
Kasčiūnas has been regularly criticized by human rights organizations for his hardline anti-immigration attitudes and discriminatory statements. In 2022, he was brought to the Ethics and Procedures Commission of the Seimas for his statement that "in cultures from which immigrants come, the value of children is by no means high. And they use them as cover, they manipulate us with them and often use them to hit our sensitivities", which was interpreted as stoking ethnic hatred. After he was proposed for the office of Minister of National Defence, 20 human rights organizations published an open letter to President Gitanas Nausėda, requesting him to not appoint Kasčiūnas. Members of the Social Democratic Party of Lithuania Vytenis Povilas Andriukaitis and Tadas Vinokur reached out to the Social Democratic Party of Germany, inquiring whether the appointment of a "far-right minister" would not jeopardize Lithuania's relations with Germany and the plan to deploy a Bundeswehr brigade on Lithuanian territory. Kasčiūnas answered the criticism by claiming that he is "not a communist activist and this, presumably, is what they don't like" His party's coalition partner, the Freedom Party, expressed that they do not support Kasčiūnas.

=== Support for far-right movements ===
Kasčiūnas participated in events glorifying the perpetrators of the Holocaust, including Lithuanian anti-Soviet partisan and Nazi collaborator Jonas Noreika. During the Gaza war, he expressed support for Israel and called the UN General Assembly resolution calling for a ceasefire in Gaza "shameful".

Kasčiūnas appears to be supportive of Donald Trump and initiated the formation of a "Friends of US President Donald J. Trump" parliamentary group in the Seimas during Trump's presidency. In an interview with Andrius Tapinas on 2 April 2024, he positively commented on Trump's activities during his first presidency but mentioned that he would vote for Joe Biden in the 2024 United States presidential election. However, following the election, Kasčiūnas stated that if he were an American, he "would have definitely voted for Donald Trump."

In 2018, Kasčiūnas invited Christian Wirth and Nicole Höchst, members of the far-right Alternative for Germany, to Lithuania, but abandoned the attempt after criticism from members of his party and its chairman Gabrielius Landsbergis.

Before the Russian invasion of Ukraine, Kasčiūnas openly supported Viktor Orbán. In 2021, he visited Hungary with two other members of the Seimas (fellow member of TS-LKD's right wing Audronius Ažubalis, and Farmer-Green member Giedrius Surplys) and visited the Hungarian border barrier, which he lauded as an important example for Lithuania.

On 31 May 2026, Kasčiūnas quoted the slogan "Good Night Left Side", a slogan used by neo-Nazi and white pride organizations, on his Facebook page after a game between FK Žalgiris and Wigry Suwałki where those slogans were displayed by football fans. The quote was criticized, and Laurynas Šedvydis appealed to the Ethics and Procedures Commission of the Seimas, asking it to investigate whether Kasčiūnas had violated the code of ethics.

=== Allegations of corruption ===
Kasčiūnas testified during the MG Baltic case, a high-profile corruption case during which four members of the Seimas were sentences for taking bribes from the business conglomerate MG Baltic. In 2015, Raimondas Kurlianskis, the vice president of the conglomerate, sought support in the Seimas for an amendment of the Consumer Credit Law, he approached Mantas Adomėnas and Eligijus Masiulis, the amendment was submitted by Šarūnas Gustainis. Kurlianskis approached Kasčiūnas for a meeting with Irena Degutienė. Non-governmental organizations which Kasčiūnas was a member of later received financial support from the conglomerate.
