= Tadas Langaitis =

Lithuanian politician

Member of the Seimas
- In office 14 November 2016 – 28 February 2018
- Succeeded by: Andrius Kupčinskas

Personal details
- Born: 7 July 1977 (age 49) Kaunas, Lithuanian SSR, Soviet Union
- Party: Homeland Union
- Spouse: Inga
- Children: Ula Langaitytė(2010) and Meda Langaitytė(2012)
- Education: Stockholm School of Economics in Riga

Tadas Langaitis is a Lithuanian politician, from November 2016 member of the Seimas, civic activist, active in social and civic projects in Lithuania.

== Awards and recognition ==
Tadas Langaitis was nominated in Young Entrepreneur of the Year category by Swedish Business Awards for social entrepreneurship. He was also nominated for The Outstanding Young Persons of the World award by JCI Lithuania in 2014.

Tadas Langatis was awarded with Order for Merits to Lithuania by the President of Lithuania in 2013.
