= Audrius Petrošius =

Lithuanian politician (born 1988)

Member of the Seimas
- Incumbent
- Assumed office 13 November 2020
- Preceded by: Algimantas Kirkutis
- Constituency: Baltija (2020–2024); Danė (2024–present)

Personal details
- Born: 4 May 1988 (age 37)
- Party: Homeland Union

Audrius Petrošius (born 4 May 1988) is a Lithuanian politician of the Homeland Union serving as a member of the Seimas since 2020. From 2019 to 2020, he was a municipal councillor of Klaipėda.
