= Rūta Miliūtė =

Lithuanian politician (born 1990)

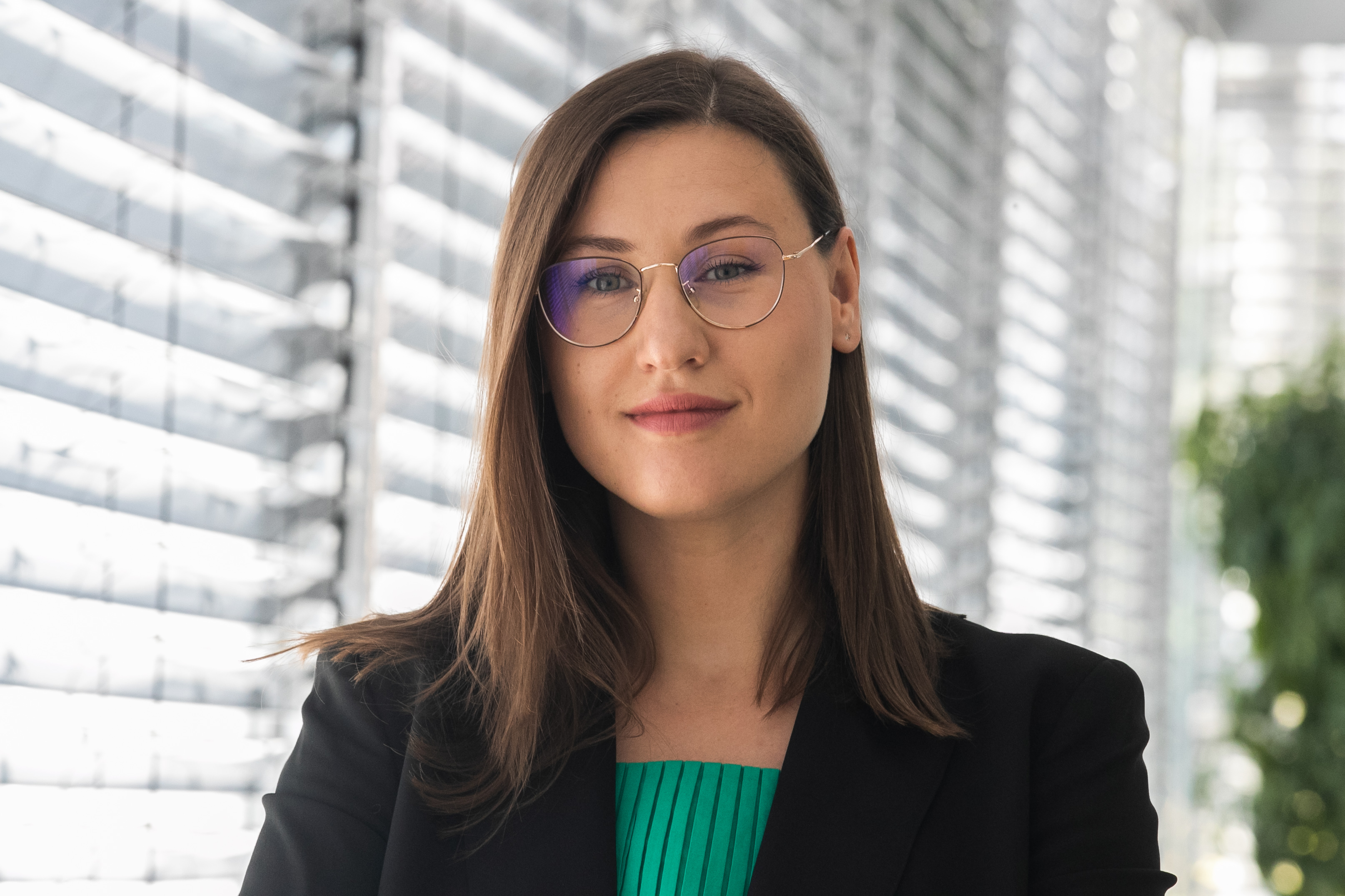
- Miliūtė in 2022

Member of the Seimas
- Incumbent
- Assumed office 14 November 2016

Personal details
- Born: 27 November 1990 (age 35)
- Party: DSVL (since 2022); LVŽS (until 2021)

Rūta Miliūtė (born 27 November 1990) is a Lithuanian politician of the Union of Democrats "For Lithuania" serving as a member of the Seimas since 2016. Until 2021, she was a member of the Lithuanian Farmers and Greens Union.
