= Paulius Saudargas =

Lithuanian politician

Paulius Saudargas MEP
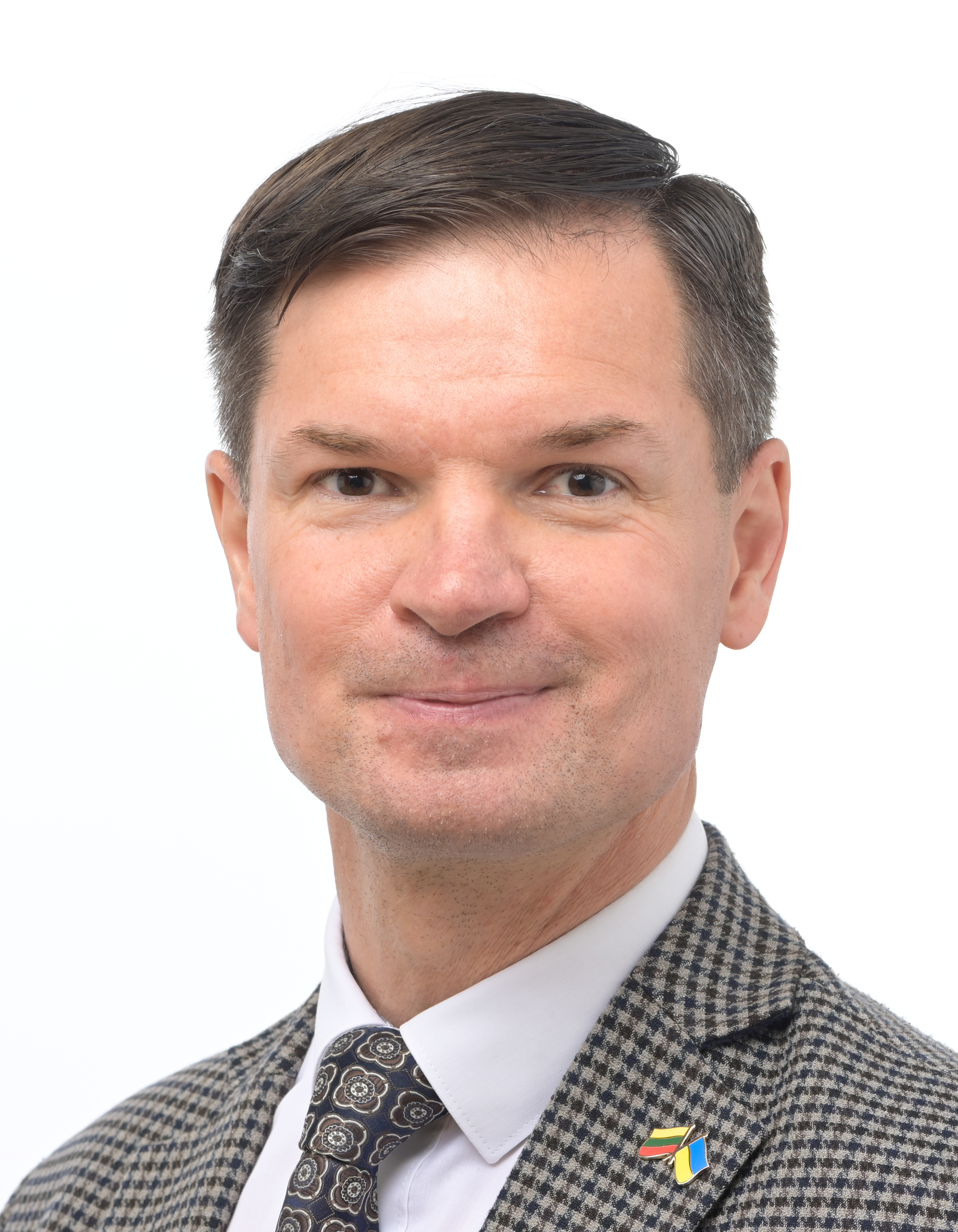

Member of the European Parliament
- Incumbent
- Assumed office 16 July 2024
- Constituency: Lithuania

Deputy Speaker of the Seimas
- In office 17 November 2020 – 15 July 2024

Member of Seimas
- In office 13 November 2020 – 15 July 2024
- Preceded by: Position established Himself (Justiniškės)
- Succeeded by: Linas Kukuraitis
- Constituency: Justiniškės – Viršuliškės
- In office 16 November 2008 – 13 November 2020
- Constituency: Justiniškės
- Preceded by: Rimantas Remeika
- Succeeded by: Post abolished

Personal details
- Born: 13 March 1979 (age 47) Kaunas, Lithuania
- Party: Homeland Union
- Spouse: Milda Saudargė
- Parent: Algirdas Saudargas (father)
- Education: Vilnius University

Paulius Saudargas (born 13 March 1979 in Kaunas) is a physicist and Deputy Speaker of the Seimas (legislature). He has been a Member of the Seimas for the Justiniškės constituency since 2008.

== Biography ==
Saudargas was born in Kaunas.

In 2001 graduated from the Faculty of Physics of Vilnius University, obtained a bachelor's degree in physics and a qualification of a physics teacher. In 2003 he obtained a master's degree in biophysics at Vilnius University, and in 2007 a PhD in biophysics, specialising in photoelectric, electroacoustic and spectroscopic studies of bacteriorhodopsin.

== Political life ==
From 2004 to 2005, he was a member of the board of the Young Christian Democrats. Between 2005 and 2007, Saudargas was a member of the board of the Lithuanian Council of Youth Organizations (LiJOT) and the Chairman of the Ethics Committee.

He is a member of the Homeland Union – Lithuanian Christian Democrats, and was deputy executive secretary from 2007 to 2008.

Since 2008 Saudargas is a Member of the Seimas, elected in Justiniškės constituency.

Alongside Laurynas Kasčiūnas, Audronius Ažubalis and Vilija Aleknaitė-Abramikienė, Saudargas is considered to be a member of the party's Christian Democratic wing, which opposes the party's line on same-sex partnerships and other social questions.

Seimas
| Preceded by Rimantas Reimeika (Justiniškės) | Member of the Seimas for Justiniškės/Justiniškės and Viršuliškės; 2008–present | Succeeded by |
