= Eugenijus Jovaiša =

Eugenijus Jovaiša (born April 24, 1950, in Klaipėda) is a Lithuanian historian, archaeologist, and professor associated with the Vilnius Pedagogical University, full member of the Lithuanian Academy of Sciences, member of the Seimas of the Republic of Lithuania (2016, 2020).

Since 1975, he has been researching the burial monuments of the Aesti tribes of the 1st–11th centuries and published the books in "Aesti" series.

== Awards ==
- 2003: Officer's cross of the Order of the Lithuanian Grand Duke Gediminas
- 2008: Lithuanian Science Prize
- 2014: Honorary Citizen of Tauragė
