= Zenonas Streikus =

Lithuanian politician (born 1954)

Member of the Seimas
- Incumbent
- Assumed office 13 November 2016
- Constituency: Jotvingių (No: 70)

Personal details
- Born: 23 December 1954 (age 71) Konstantinava Village, Rokiškis District, Lithuania
- Party: Union of Democrats "For Lithuania"
- Education: Vilnius University

Zenonas Streikus (born 23 December 1954) is a Lithuanian politician and a member of the Seimas.

== Biography ==
Streikus received a Diploma in Psychology and Teaching from Vilnius University. He was elected 2016 and re-elected in 2020.
