= Laima Andrikienė =

Lithuanian politician

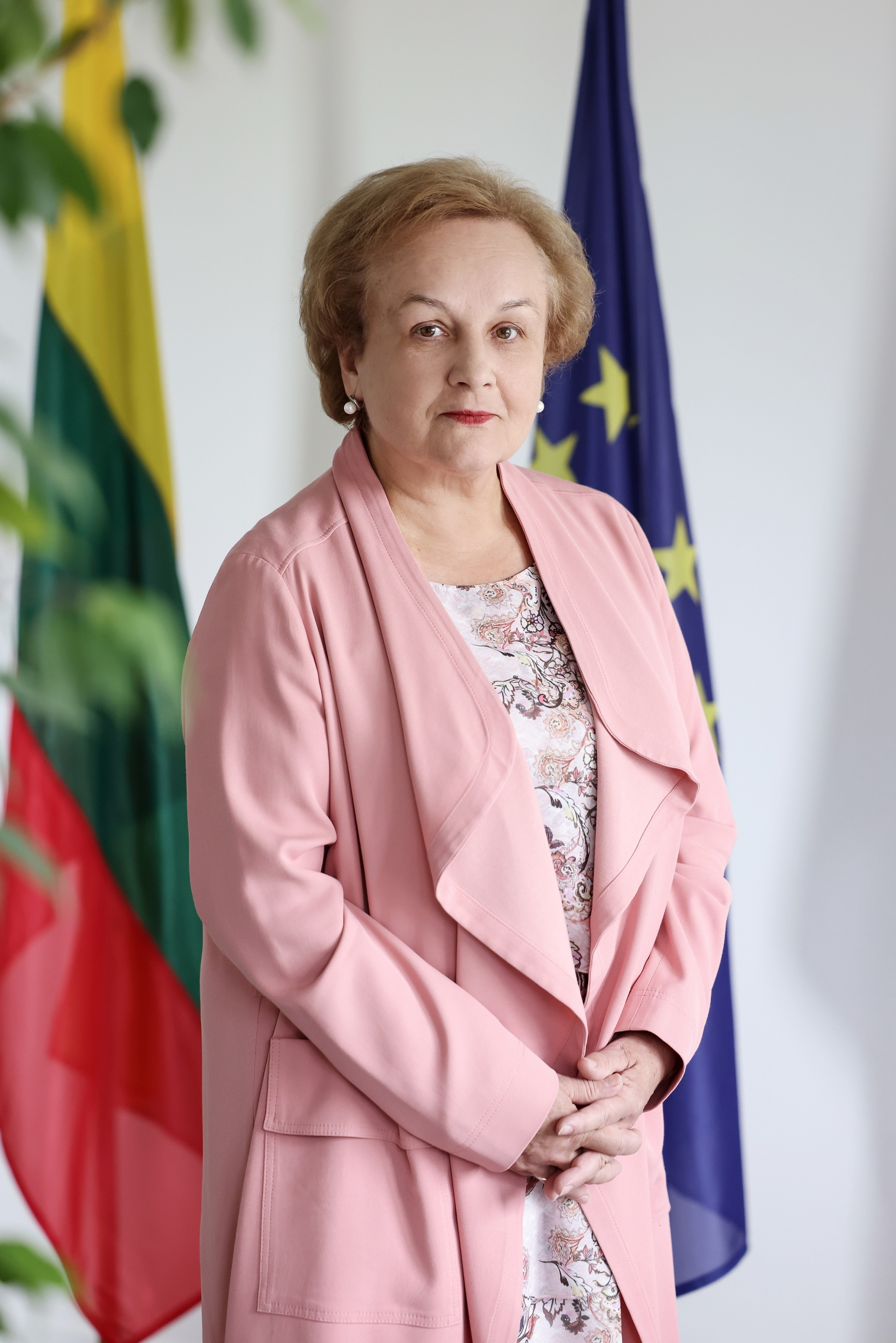
- Official portrait, 2023

Member of the European Court of Auditors for Lithuania
- Incumbent
- Assumed office 16 November 2022
- President: Tony Murphy
- Preceded by: Rimantas Šadžius

Personal details
- Born: 1 January 1958 (age 68) Druskininkai, Lithuanian SSR, Soviet Union
- Party: European People's Party
- Education: Doctorate in Economics
- Alma mater: Vilnius University, University of Manchester, Georgetown University
- Occupation: Politician
- Awards: Ordre national du Mérite; Independence Medal; Order of the Lithuanian Grand Duke Gediminas; Lietuvos kariuomenės kūrėjų savanorių medalis; Order of Honor; Orden de Isabel la Católica

Laima Liucija Andrikienė (born 1 January 1958) is a Lithuanian politician serving as member of the European Court of Auditors since November 2022.

Andrikienė is signatory of the Act of the Re-Establishment of the State of Lithuania, member of Reconstituent Seimas (1990–1992), former and current member of the Seimas (1992–2000, 2020-current), former chair of Committee on Foreign Affairs of the Seimas, former vice-president of the Parliamentary Assembly of the Council of Europe, former Minister of Industry and Trade, former minister of European Affairs, and former member of the European Parliament (2004–2014, 2016–2019) for the Homeland Union (Lithuanian Conservatives) and European People’s Party, respectively.

== Biography ==
Andrikienė was born in Druskininkai on 1 January 1958. In 1980 Andrikienė graduated from Vilnius University with a degree in Economics and Math. She worked as an engineer, and later as a research fellow, at the Lithuanian Institute for Research of Agricultural Economy. She successfully concluded doctoral studies in 1994. Andrikiene spent time as a Fellow at University of Manchester and as a Pew Economic Freedom Fellow at Georgetown University.

== Political career ==
In 1990 Andrikienė was elected to the Supreme Council of Lithuania and was a signatory to the Act of the Re-Establishment of the State of Lithuania. In the elections in 1992, she was elected as the member of the Sixth Seimas through the electoral list of Sąjūdis. In 1996, representing Homeland Union, she was elected for another term of the Seimas in Pramonės (17) single-seat constituency in Kaunas.

In December 1996 Andrikienė was appointed the Minister of the Industry and Trade for a short time. Later same month she was appointed a Minister of European Affairs.

Andrikienė left the Homeland Union at the end of 1998 together with her then-husband and fellow member of the Seimas Vidmantas Žiemelis. In 1999 they founded a short-lived Homeland People’s Party. In 2001 she joined the Lithuanian Union of the Right and in 2003 rejoined the Homeland Union.

In 2004 Andrikienė was elected to the European Parliament for Lithuania. She was elected from the electoral list of the Homeland Union and sat with the European People's Party. She was reelected in 2009 and was MEP up until 2014. As from 30 May 2016, Laima Liucija Andrikienė replaced Gabrielius Landsbergis (who stood down and took part in campaigning before 2016 Lithuanian parliamentary election) as an MEP for her third term. She served up until 2019. She was a Member of the Committee on International Trade, Member of Sub-Committee on Security and Defense, Substitute Member of Foreign Affairs Committee, 1st Vice Chair of the Delegation to the EU-Kazakhstan, EU-Kyrgyzstan, EU-Uzbekistan and EU-Tajikistan Parliamentary Cooperation Committees and for relations with Turkmenistan and Mongolia and a Substitute Member of the Delegation for the relations with the United States.

In 2018 she won the International Trade Award of the Parliament Magazine’s Annual MEP Awards.

In 2020 Lithuanian parliamentary election, Andrikienė was elected to the Seimas. She was confirmed Chair of the Committee on Foreign Affairs in January 2022.

Andrikienė started a 6-year term as one of 27 members of the European Court of Auditors in November 2022.

== Awards ==
- 1997 Ordre national du Mérite, France (Grand Officier)
- 2000 Independence Medal (Lithuania)
- 2003 Medal “Ubi concordia ibi victoria” of the Baltic Assembly
- 2004 Order of the Lithuanian Grand Duke Gediminas (Commander’s Cross)
- 2007 Honoris causa, Kingston University
- 2008 Award of Lithuanian Confederation of Industrialists
- 2012 Lietuvos kariuomenės kūrėjų savanorių medalis
- 2014 Medal of Diplomacy, Taiwan
- 2014 Order of Honor, Georgia
- 2018 MEP of the Year 2018 (international trade) – "The Parliament Magazine"
- 2020 Orden de Isabel la Católica, Kingdom of Spain (Cruz de Oficial)

Seimas
Preceded by Kęstutis Povilas Paukštys	Member of the Seimas for Pramonės constituency 1996–2000	Succeeded by Eimundas Savickas
