= Arvydas Anušauskas =

Lithuanian historian and politician (born 1963)

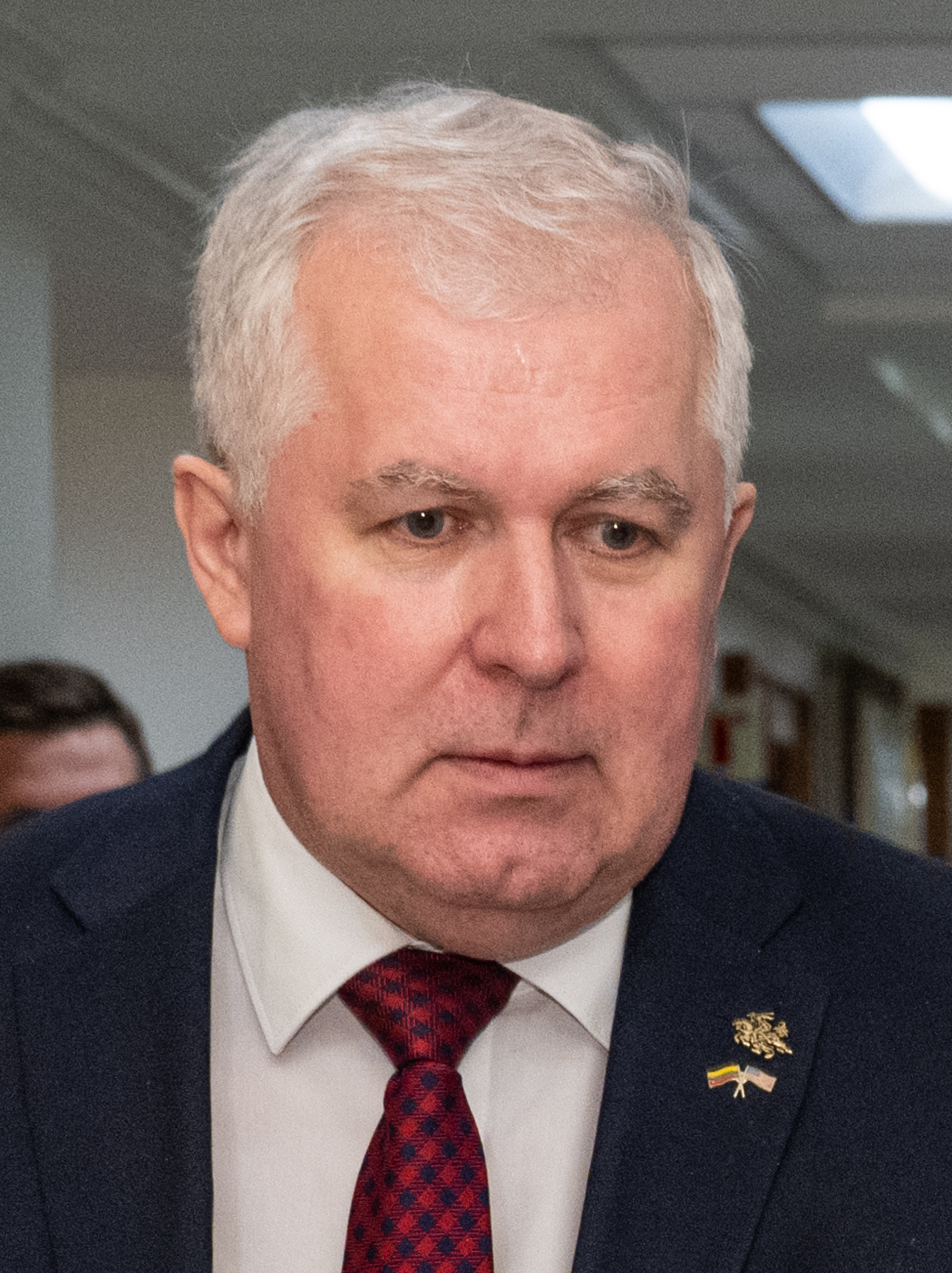
- Anušauskas in 2024

Minister of National Defence
- In office 11 December 2020 – 25 March 2024
- Prime Minister: Ingrida Šimonytė
- Preceded by: Raimundas Karoblis
- Succeeded by: Laurynas Kasčiūnas

Member of Seimas
- Incumbent
- Assumed office 13 November 2020
- Preceded by: Aušra Papirtienė
- Constituency: Kalniečiai
- In office 14 November 2016 – 12 November 2020
- Constituency: Multi-member
- In office 16 November 2012 – 13 November 2016
- Preceded by: Mantas Adomėnas
- Succeeded by: Mykolas Majauskas
- Constituency: Senamiestis-Žvėrynas
- In office 17 November 2008 – 15 November 2012
- Constituency: Multi-member

Personal details
- Born: 29 September 1963 (age 62) Vilnius, Lithuanian SSR, Soviet Union
- Party: Homeland Union
- Spouse: Lina Anušauskienė (m. 2015)
- Children: 1
- Education: Vilnius University; Vytautas Magnus University
- Occupation: Politician; historian
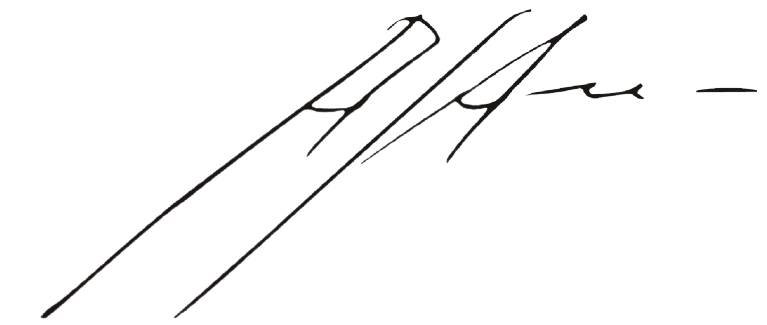
- Signature

Military service
- Branch/service: Lithuanian National Defence Volunteer Forces
- Rank: Lieutenant

Arvydas Anušauskas (born 29 September 1963) is a Lithuanian politician and historian. He focuses on the history of the interwar Lithuanian secret services, KGB actions in Lithuania, and Soviet repressions in Lithuania. As a member of the Homeland Union – Lithuanian Christian Democrats, he was elected to the Seimas (parliament) in 2008 and reelected in 2012, 2016 and 2020.

On 7 December 2020, he was approved to be the Minister of National Defence in the Šimonytė Cabinet. On 15 March 2024, he announced his resignation.

== Early life and education ==
Anušauskas was born in Vilnius, Lithuania. In 1981, he graduated from Vilnius Secondary school No. 34. From 1981 to 1982, Anušauskas studied in Vilnius Technical school No. 21. In autumn 1982, he enrolled at Vilnius University and graduated with a Master of History in 1989. While studying, he was conscripted to Soviet Army where he served from 1983 to 1985. In 1995, Anušauskas obtained a PhD in humanities at Vytautas Magnus University. In 1990, after Lithuania declared independence, he started serving in the Lithuanian National Defence Volunteer Forces and was promoted to reserve lieutenant in 1995.

== Early career ==
Anušauskas was a research fellow at the Lithuanian Institute of History from 1989 to 2000. From 1996 to 1997, he worked as an associate professor at the Faculty of Humanities, Vytautas Magnus University. From 1998 to 2007, Anušauskas was the Head of the Genocide and Resistance Research Centre of Lithuania (GRRLC). In parallel to this position, he continued academical career. From 1996 to 2006, Anušauskas was an associate professor at the Faculty of History, Vilnius Pedagogical University. From 2002 to 2007, he was a visiting associate professor at the Institute of International Relations and Political Science, Vilnius University, and an associate professor at the Faculty of History, Vilnius University from 2002 to 2008. Anušauskas is an author and co-author of numerous history books and 14 scripts for documentaries, and around 100 studies and articles published in Lithuanian, Polish, Latvian, French and German scientific publications. His first study on the interwar Lithuanian intelligence services was published in 1993.

== Political career ==
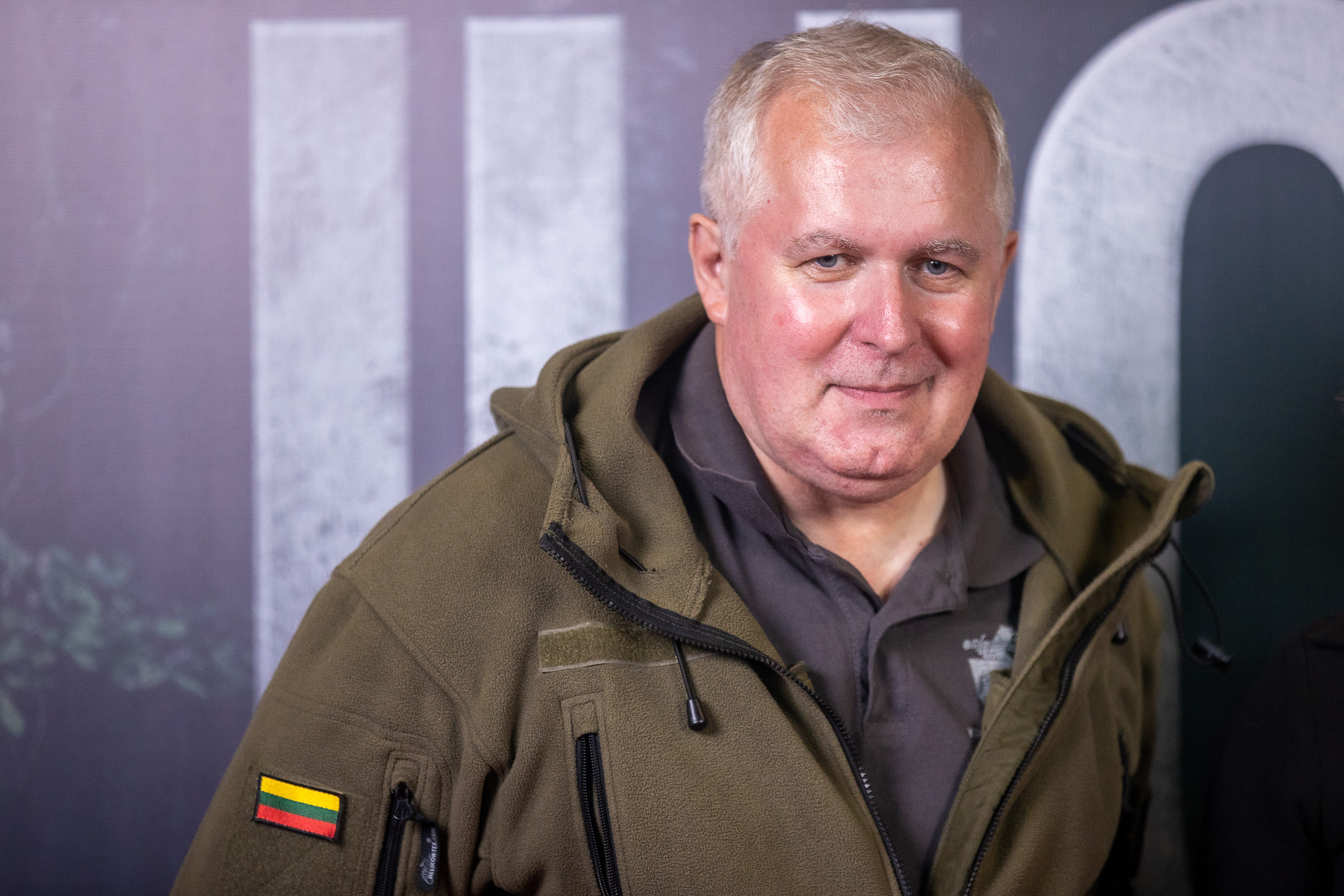
Anušauskas in 2023

Anušauskas joined the Homeland Union – Lithuanian Christian Democrats in 2007 (although he stood in this party's multi-member list in 2004 parliamentary election). He was elected to the Seimas (parliament) in 2008 and re-elected ever since. Anušauskas was the Chair of the Committee on National Security and Defence during his first term 2008–2012. Currently, he is a member of the Committee on National Security and Defence, Deputy Chair of the Commission for Parliamentary Scrutiny of Criminal Intelligence, member of the Commission for the Cause of Freedom, and the National Historical Memory and member of many parliamentary groups.

== Awards ==
- Prize in the contest Pragiedruliai held by the Radio and Television Commission of Lithuania (2007);
- Decoration of honour Lithuanian Diplomacy Star by the Lithuanian Ministry of Foreign Affairs (2012);
- 4th Class Order of the Cross of Terra Mariana of the Republic of Estonia (2013);
- Cross of the Knight of the Order for Merits to Lithuania (2018).
- 3rd Class Order of Prince Yaroslav the Wise of Ukraine (2022).

Seimas
Preceded by Mantas Adomėnas	Member of the Seimas for Senamiestis; 2008–2012	Succeeded by Mykolas Majauskas
Preceded by Aušra Papirtienė	Member of the Seimas for Kalniečiai; 2020–present	Incumbent
