= Dainius Gaižauskas =

Lithuanian politician (born 1975)

Member of the Seimas
- Incumbent
- Assumed office 2016

Personal details
- Born: 30 March 1975 (age 51) Marijampolė, Soviet Union (now Lithuania)
- Party: LVŽS
- Education: Law Academy of Lithaunia

Dainius Gaižauskas (born March 30, 1975) is a Lithuanian police commissioner and politician. In 1999, he graduated with a master's degree in law from the Law Academy of Lithaunia (known today as Mykolas Romeris University). He has been a member of the Seimas since 2016 for the Lithuanian Farmers and Greens Union.
