= Young Christian Democrats (Lithuania) =

Christian youth organization based in Lithuania

Young Christian Democrats Jaunieji krikščionys demokratai
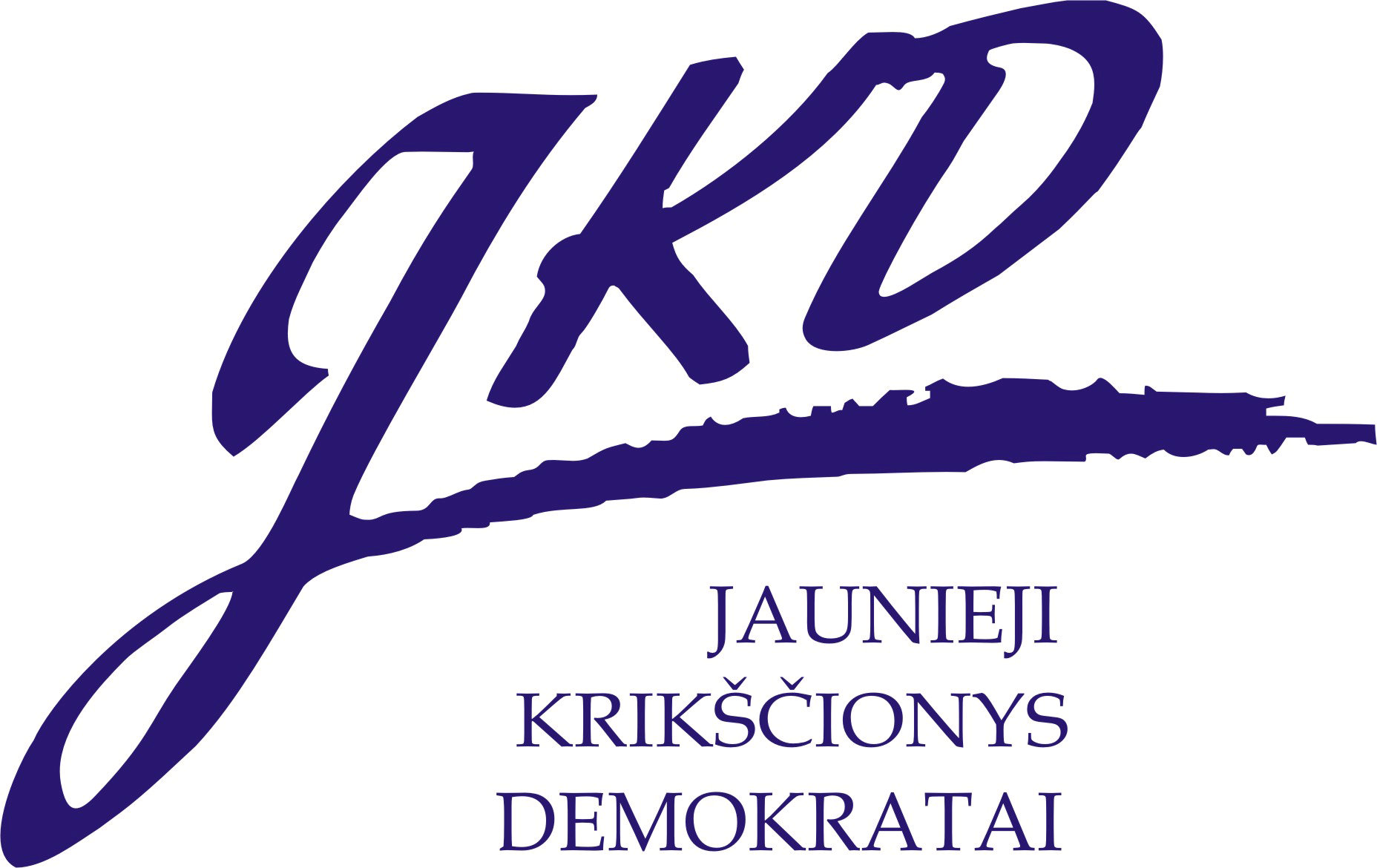
- Chairperson: Goda Karazijaitė
- Founded: 1993
- Headquarters: Vilnius
- Mother party: Homeland Union – Lithuanian Christian Democrats
- European affiliation: Youth of the European People's Party (YEPP)
- Website: www.krikdemai.eu

Young Christian Democrats (Lithuanian: Jaunieji krikščionys demokratai, JKD) is a youth organization in Lithuania which is a branch of the Homeland Union. JKD (Jaunieji Krikscionys Demokratai) was founded in 1993 as a non-governmental organization and unites more than 1,000 young people in 30 branches in different districts of Lithuania as well as abroad.

== International activities ==
JKD is one of the founding members of YEPP (Youth of the European People's Party) and had the member of the Board in this organization for 4 years. Dozens of international projects together with Belarusian, Czech, Danish, Dutch, Estonian, Georgian, German, Latvian, Norwegian, Russian, Swedish and Ukrainian partners were carried out. JKD work closely with Konrad Adenauer and Eduardo Frei Foundations.
