= Vidmantas Žiemelis =

Lithuanian politician (born 1950)

Vidmantas Žiemelis (born 4 December 1950) is a Lithuanian politician. In 1990 he was among those who signed the Act of the Re-Establishment of the State of Lithuania.

He also served at one point as Lithuania's Minister of Internal Affairs.
