= Homeland Union =

Political party in Lithuania

Homeland Union – Lithuanian Christian Democrats Tėvynės sąjunga – Lietuvos krikščionys demokratai
- Abbreviation: TS–LKD
- Chairman: Laurynas Kasčiūnas
- First deputy chair: Paulius Saudargas
- Deputy chairpersons: Valdas Benkunskas; Radvilė Morkūnaitė-Mikulėnienė; Gintarė Skaistė; Kazys Starkevičius; Justinas Urbanavičius
- Executive secretary: Martynas Prievelis
- Founders: Vytautas Landsbergis; Gediminas Vagnorius
- Founded: 1 May 1993
- Preceded by: Sąjūdis
- Headquarters: J. Jasinskio g. 17, Vilnius
- Youth wing: Young Conservative League
- Membership (2022): ▲12,819
- Ideology: Christian democracy; Liberal conservatism; Economic liberalism; Pro-Europeanism
- Political position: Centre-right
- European affiliation: European People's Party
- European Parliament group: European People's Party Group
- International affiliation: Centrist Democrat International (observer); International Democrat Union (formerly)
- Colours: Blue; Turquoise
- Seimas: 28 / 141
- European Parliament: 3 / 11
- Municipal councils: 243 / 1,498
- Mayors: 5 / 60

Website
- tsajunga.lt

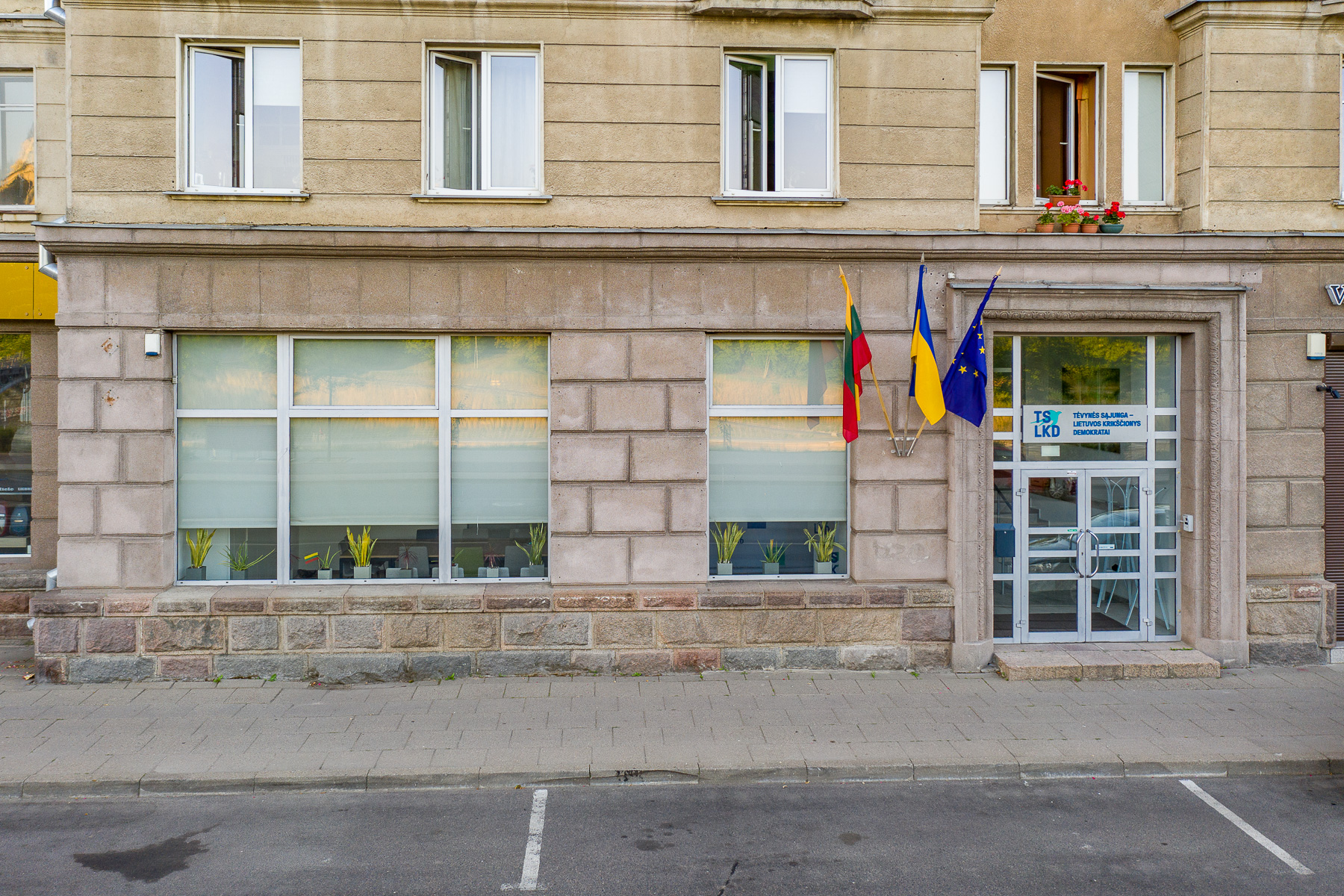
Party office

The Homeland Union – Lithuanian Christian Democrats (Lithuanian: Tėvynės sąjunga – Lietuvos krikščionys demokratai, TS–LKD), also colloquially known as the Conservatives (Lithuanian: Konservatoriai), is a centre-right political party in Lithuania. It has 18,000 members and 28 of 141 seats in the Seimas. Its current leader is Laurynas Kasčiūnas following the resignation of Gabrielius Landsbergis in 2024 after the party's loss in the recent election. It is a member of the European People's Party (EPP).

Since 1996, the party has included the western house martin in its various logos over the years.

== Platform ==
It is the main centre-right party, and has been traditionally allied to other centre-right or liberal parties such as the Liberals' Movement, Freedom Party, Liberal and Centre Union or the National Resurrection Party with which they are usually grouped together and formed coalitions in the past.

The Homeland Union is conservative. For most of its existence, it has explicitly defined itself as anti-communist (mainly because the main opposition party to the Homeland Union was the Democratic Labour Party of Lithuania, which was created from the Communist Party of Lithuania in 1990), with an ideology influenced by liberal conservatism, Christian democracy, and nationalism. TS–LKD is economically liberal, supports a free market economy and was described as neo-liberal.

After the election of Gabrielius Landsbergis as leader of the party in 2015 (especially after 2017), the Homeland Union started to describe itself as the country's people's party (Lithuanian: žmonių partija) and moved more to a centrist direction, rebranding itself as a European moderate party, while still maintaining centre-right profile (especially on economics).

Laurynas Kaščiūnas, the former minister of national defence and a representative of the party's conservative wing, won the 2025 party chairmanship election. Political analysts describe this as a party's moderate shift to the right following an election defeat and aim to reclaim back conservative voters.

== History ==
=== Establishment, expansion, the first government and splits (1993–2000) ===
It was founded in May 1993 by the right wing of the Reform Movement of Lithuania, led by Vytautas Landsbergis, who had led Lithuania to independence. His supporter, former Prime Minister of Lithuania Gediminas Vagnorius, became party Board's chairman. Some members of Sąjūdis coalition, but not Sąjūdis itself (e. g. Vilija Aleknaitė-Abramikienė), joined new party. The party was established by the model of then–ruling conservative parties' – United States Republican Party, United Kingdom Conservative Party and Moderate Party.

In December 1993, the party's youth wing, Young Conservative League, was formed. In February 1994, the Homeland Union formed its own parliamentary group in Seimas. Later that year, the Homeland Union established its branches in all of Lithuania. In the 1995 municipal election, in which the party stood for the first time, it got 28.76% of the vote and returned 428 councillors. In the 1996 national elections, it secured 31.3% of the vote and returned 70 deputies to the Seimas. After these elections, the party formed coalition government with the Lithuanian Christian Democratic Party (and received support from the Lithuanian Centre Union).

After presidential election of 1997 and 1998, in which Vytautas Landsbergis came third, party's internal conflicts became pronounced. It led to the expulsion of Laima Liucija Andrikienė and Vidmantas Žiemelis from the party's board in late 1998 and their resignation from the party in 1999.

In 1999, conflicts started between the President Valdas Adamkus and the Prime Minister Gediminas Vagnorius (who also was the party's Board chairman), that involved party's leader Vytautas Landsbergis. Crisis (and resignation of Vagnorius) sped up reorganisation of party structures. Most important of them was the merger of the Political Council and the Board, which produced centralized leadership. In 2000, Gediminas Vagnorius' supporters split and new party called the Union of Moderate Conservatives was formed.

Yet another split was caused by the resignation of Rolandas Paksas (he replaced Gediminas Vagnorius as the Prime Minister and party's Board chairman), although most of the Rolandas Paksas' supporters moved to the Liberal Union of Lithuania in 1999 and 2000. In 2000 municipal elections, the party received just 8.8 per cent of the vote ant mayorships of Kaunas and other districts.

=== Back in opposition, consolidation and the second government (2000–2012) ===
In 2000, the Homeland Union was reduced to 8.6 per cent of votes and 9 deputies. In 2001, idea of merge of all right wing parties was proposed by the Homeland People's Party. This proposal was accepted by the Homeland Union. In 2003 and 2004, it merged with the Right Union of Lithuania (which by itself was founded by former members of the Homeland Union and various minor parties) and the Lithuanian Union of Political Prisoners and Deportees respectively. At the same time, the party attracted members from Lithuanian Social Democracy 2000 (e.g. Rimantas Jonas Dagys) and Modern Christian-Democratic Union (e.g. Egidijus Vareikis).

In May 2003, a new leader was elected, Andrius Kubilius, who prior this served as deputy leader of the party. Since 2003, the party started cooperating with the Liberal and Centre Union. The Homeland Union changed its logo (the Columns of Gediminids were replaced by green marlin's silhouette, which was similar to the logo used by the time of 1996 parliamentary election campaign, in which Kubilius was author of programme).

After Lithuania's admission to the European Union in 2004, it won two seats in the election to the European Parliament, one of whom was Vytautas Landsbergis, who sat in the EPP-ED Group. At the 2004 election to the Seimas, the party won 14.6% of the popular vote and 25 out of 141 seats. After these elections, the Homeland Union proposed the Liberal and Centre Union a coalition with the Social Democratic Party of Lithuania, but this didn't came to being. Between 2006 and 2007, the party supported Gediminas Kirkilas-led government.

Until the merger with the Lithuanian Union of Political Prisoners and Deportees and the Right Union of Lithuania, it was known just as the Homeland Union (Lithuanian Conservatives). Prior to 2008 it was known as the Homeland Union (Conservatives, Political Prisoners and the Exiled, Christian Democrats) or TS. The last change of the name was a result of the merger with the Lithuanian Nationalist Union on 11 March 2008, and the Lithuanian Christian Democrats on 17 May 2008, after which the Homeland Union – Lithuanian Christian Democrats became Lithuania's largest party with more than 18,000 members. After these two mergers, youth wings of these parties (Young Nationalists Organisation and Young Christian Democrats) became the Homeland Union's youth wings.

During 2006 to 2008, the Homeland Union supported the Statesmen (Lithuanian: valstybininkai) conspiracy theory, which claims that a deep state in the Ministry of Foreign Affairs and the State Security Department of Lithuania (VSD) seeks to take control of the country. According to Antanas Valionis, the party interpreted state security investigations into previous unexplained incidents, such as the Bražuolė bridge bombing in 1994 and the bombing of the editorial office of Lietuvos rytas in 1995, as a conspiracy against them.

At the 2008 legislative election, the Homeland Union won 19.69 per cent of the national vote and 45 seats in the Seimas. Becoming the largest party in the Seimas, it formed a coalition government with the Liberal Movement, Liberal and Centre Union and the National Resurrection Party. Together, they held a majority of 80 out of 141 seats in the Seimas, and the Homeland Union's leader, Andrius Kubilius, became Prime Minister for a second time.

In 2010, party's deputy chairman Vidmantas Žiemelis resigned from the party and joined Christian Party. It (along with the split in the National Resurrection Party parliamentary group) caused Kubilius–led government to become a minority one.

In June 2011, the Lithuanian Nationalist Union declared its withdrawal from the party, although Nationalist faction remained in the Homeland Union. In June 2012, Aurelija Stancikienė resigned from the party and joined the Way of Courage.

=== Opposition and the third government (2012–2024) ===
Support for the party decreased in the 2012 parliamentary election, and it was excluded from the government. It was credited to many unpopular decisions made during the time of government, and the unpopularity of the Andrius Kubilius. In the 2014 European Parliament election, the party managed to defeat by narrow margin their main competitors, the Social Democratic Party of Lithuania. After 2015 municipal election, Andrius Kubilius resigned from party's leader position.

Subsequent leadership election was won by the Member of European Parliament (and former advisor of Andrius Kubilius) Gabrielius Landsbergis. Gabrielius Landsbergis initiated various changes in the party. Main change was that in large cities candidates to the Seimas were replaced with younger candidates, while older candidates moved rural constituencies (e. g. Rasa Juknevičienė stood in Aukštaitija single-member constituency instead of one in Žaliakalnis) or removed altogether (e.g. Arimantas Dumčius was expelled for remarks over Adolf Hitler's economic policy).

Between 2014 and 2016, the party was competing on the centre-right political wing with the Liberal Movement, but due to the so-called MG Baltic corruption scandal in May 2016, the Liberal Movement lost about half of its support. As a result of the scandal, the Homeland Union's support slightly increased at the 2016 legislative election (and it overtook the Lithuanian Peasant and Greens Union by 0.18 per cent), but, due to failure to win more single-member seats in Seimas, the number of seats held by the party fell to 31.

After these elections, various pundits claimed that the Lithuanian Farmers and Greens Union could form coalition with the Homeland Union, but leader of Lithuanian Farmers and Greens Union Ramūnas Karbauskis proposed wide coalition between aforementioned parties and the Social Democratic Party. The Homeland Union's leader Gabrielius Landsbergis himself proposed coalition between the Homeland Union, the Lithuanian Farmers and Greens Union and the Liberal Movement, although both Ramūnas Karbauskis and Liberal Movement's leader Eugenijus Gentvilas turned down this offer. Eventually, coalition was formed between the Lithuanian Farmers and Greens Union and the Social Democratic Party of Lithuania, which lasted until the autumn of 2017.

After Landsbergis reelection as party's leader in 2017, primaries were introduced for candidates to the presidential nominees and party list in parliamentary election.

In 2018, Mantas Adomėnas's membership in the party was suspended due to relations of MG Baltic and Adomėnas himself. Later, Adomėnas left Homeland Union's parliamentary group and the party itself. By autumn of 2018, the party held presidential primaries (the first party in Lithuania to do so), which were won by Ingrida Šimonytė. Šimonytė's performance in 2019 presidential election raised possibility about her nomination to the first place on party's list and as the future Prime Minister.

In 2020, members of the Homeland Union, Rimantas Dagys and Egidijus Vareikis formed new party, the Christian Union.

In the 2020 parliamentary election, the party won the most seats (50) and agreed to form coalition with the Liberal Movement and the Freedom Party. In November 2020, Ingrida Šimonytė became the new Prime Minister of a Homeland Union-Lithuanian Christian Democrats-led coalition.

In the 2023 municipal elections, the Homeland Union managed to win a mayorship of Vilnius (for the first time since 2011), but lost mayorships and majorities in rural councils. In 2024 presidential election Ingrida Šimonytė was selected as candidate from the party, but she lost incumbent President of Republic Gitanas Nausėda.

=== Again in opposition (from 2024) ===
In the parliamentary election of the same year, the Homeland Union won 18.35 per cent of the vote, but won just 28 seats due to poor performance in single-member constituencies. Gabrielius Landsbergis announced his resignation as leader of the Homeland Union and as member of the next Seimas. His vice, Radvilė Morkūnaitė-Mikulėnienė, replacing him as interim leader. It triggered new leadership election in 2025.

== Popular support ==
During the 1990s, the party was strong in urban areas with Panevėžys and Kaunas being its strongholds. It could explained by national composition in these urban areas (Lithuanians in 2001 census made up 95 and 92 per cent of population respectively). In rural areas the party was strongest in Alytus and Lazdijai districts. Although the party lost two-thirds of its support nationwide during 1997 and 2000, these areas remained supportive to the party up until early 2010s. The one exception would be Pasvalys district, where the party managed to obtain over 20 per cent of the vote in 2000 municipal elections.

After the 2008 merger with Lithuanian Christian Democrats, the Homeland Union gained support from Molėtai district, which was stronghold of Lithuanian Christian Democrats. In early 2010s with the rise of public election committees the Homeland Union lost support in Panevėžys and Kaunas. In return, due to internal migration and suburbanisation, the party gained support in Vilnius area (notable example, Naujoji Vilnia).

== Chairmen ==
No.	Chairman	Period		
No.	Chairman	From	Until	Time
1	Vytautas Landsbergis	1 May 1993	24 May 2003	10 years, 23 days
2	Andrius Kubilius	24 May 2003	9 May 2015	11 years, 350 days
3	Gabrielius Landsbergis	9 May 2015	28 October 2024	9 years, 172 days
-	Radvilė Morkūnaitė-Mikulėnienė (temporarily)	28 October 2024	9 February 2025	104 days
4	Laurynas Kasčiūnas	9 February 2025	Present	1 year, 264 days

== Organisation ==
=== Factions ===
First faction to be established within the party was Christian Democrats' faction in 2003. Since then (mainly due to mergers with other parties) new factions were established.

The party currently is split into factions, which are based by former parties:

- Lithuanian Christian Democrats (Homeland Union – Lithuanian Christian Democrats' by-law recognises this faction as a separate entity within the party). Notable members: Irena Degutienė, Paulius Saudargas.
- Political Prisoners and Deportees. Notable members: Gabrielius Landsbergis, Radvilė Morkūnaitė-Mikulėnienė.
- Nationalists

== Election results ==
=== Seimas ===
Election	Leader	Votes (Note: Proportional representation votes.)	%	Seats	+/–	Government
1996	Vytautas Landsbergis	409,585	31.34 (#1)	70 / 141	New	Coalition
2000	Vytautas Landsbergis	126,850	8.62 (#5)	9 / 141	▼61	Opposition
2004	Andrius Kubilius	176,409	14.75 (#2)	25 / 141	▲16	Opposition
2008	Andrius Kubilius	243,823	19.72 (#1)	45 / 141	▲20	Coalition
2012	Andrius Kubilius	206,590	15.75 (#3)	33 / 141	▼12	Opposition
2016	Gabrielius Landsbergis	276,275	22.63 (#2)	31 / 141	▼2	Opposition
2020	Gabrielius Landsbergis	292,124	25.77 (#1)	50 / 141	▲19	Coalition
2024	Gabrielius Landsbergis	224,026	18.35 (#2)	28 / 141	▼22	Opposition

=== European Parliament ===
Election	List leader	Votes	%	Seats	+/–	EP Group
2004	Vytautas Landsbergis	151,400	12.58 (#3)	2 / 13	New	EPP-ED
2009	Vytautas Landsbergis	147,756	26.86 (#1)	4 / 12	▲2	EPP
2014	Gabrielius Landsbergis	199,393	17.43 (#1)	2 / 11	▼2	EPP
2019	Liudas Mažylis	248,736	19.74 (#1)	3 / 11	▲1	EPP
2024	Andrius Kubilius	144,525	21.33 (#1)	3 / 11	0	EPP

== Members of the parliament ==
Parliamentarian	Since	Constituency
Vilija Aleknaitė-Abramikienė	2020	Nationwide
Laima Liucija Andrikienė	2020	Nationwide
Arvydas Anušauskas	2008	Kalniečiai
Dalia Asanavičiūtė	2020	Nationwide
Audronius Ažubalis	1996	Nationwide
Agnė Bilotaitė	2008	Paneriai-Grigiškės
Antanas Čepononis	2020	Radviliškis-Tytuvėnai
Justas Džiugelis	2020	Nationwide
Aistė Gedvilienė	2020	Fabijoniškės
Jonas Gudauskas	2020	Nationwide
Irena Haase	2018	Nationwide
Sergejus Jovaiša	2012	Nationwide
Vytautas Juozapaitis	2012	Aleksotas-Vilijampolė
Laurynas Kasčiūnas	2016	Nationwide
Vytautas Kernagis	2016	Pašilaičiai
Dainius Kreivys	2012	Verkiai
Andrius Kupčinskas	2020	Nationwide
Paulė Kuzmickienė	2019	Žirmūnai
Gabrielius Landsbergis	2016	Centras-Žaliakalnis
Mindaugas Lingė	2020	Šeškinė-Šnipiškės
Matas Maldeikis	2020	Nationwide
Kęstutis Masiulis	2000	Nationwide
Bronislovas Matelis	2020	Nationwide
Antanas Matulas	1996	Pasvalys – Pakruojis
Radvilė Morkūnaitė-Mikulėnienė	2016	Pilaitė-Karoliniškės
Andrius Navickas	2017	Nationwide
Monika Navickienė	2016	Naujoji Vilnia
Žygimantas Pavilionis	2016	Naujamiestis-Naujininkai
Audrius Petrošius	2020	Baltija (Klaipėda)
Liuda Pociūnienė	2020	Nationwide
Arvydas Pocius	2020	Danė (Klaipėda)
Edmundas Pupinis	2016	Utena
Valdas Rakutis	2020	Nationwide
Jurgis Razma	1996	Nationwide
Paulius Saudargas	2008	Justiniškės-Viršuliškės
Jurgita Sejonienė	2020	Nationwide
Gintarė Skaistė	2016	Panemunė
Mindaugas Skritulskas	2020	Mėguva (Palanga-Kretinga)
Linas Slušnys	2020	Nationwide
Kazys Starkevičius	2004	Nationwide
Algis Strelčiūnas	2012	Lazdynai
Stasys Šedbaras	2008	Nationwide
Ingrida Šimonytė	2016	Antakalnis
Jurgita Šiugždinienė	2020	Šilainiai
Bronius Urbanavičius	2020	Garliava
Arūnas Valinskas	2020	Nationwide
Andrius Vyšniauskas	2020	Marijampolė
Emanuelis Zingeris	1990	Nationwide
