= Jurgis Razma =

Lithuanian politician

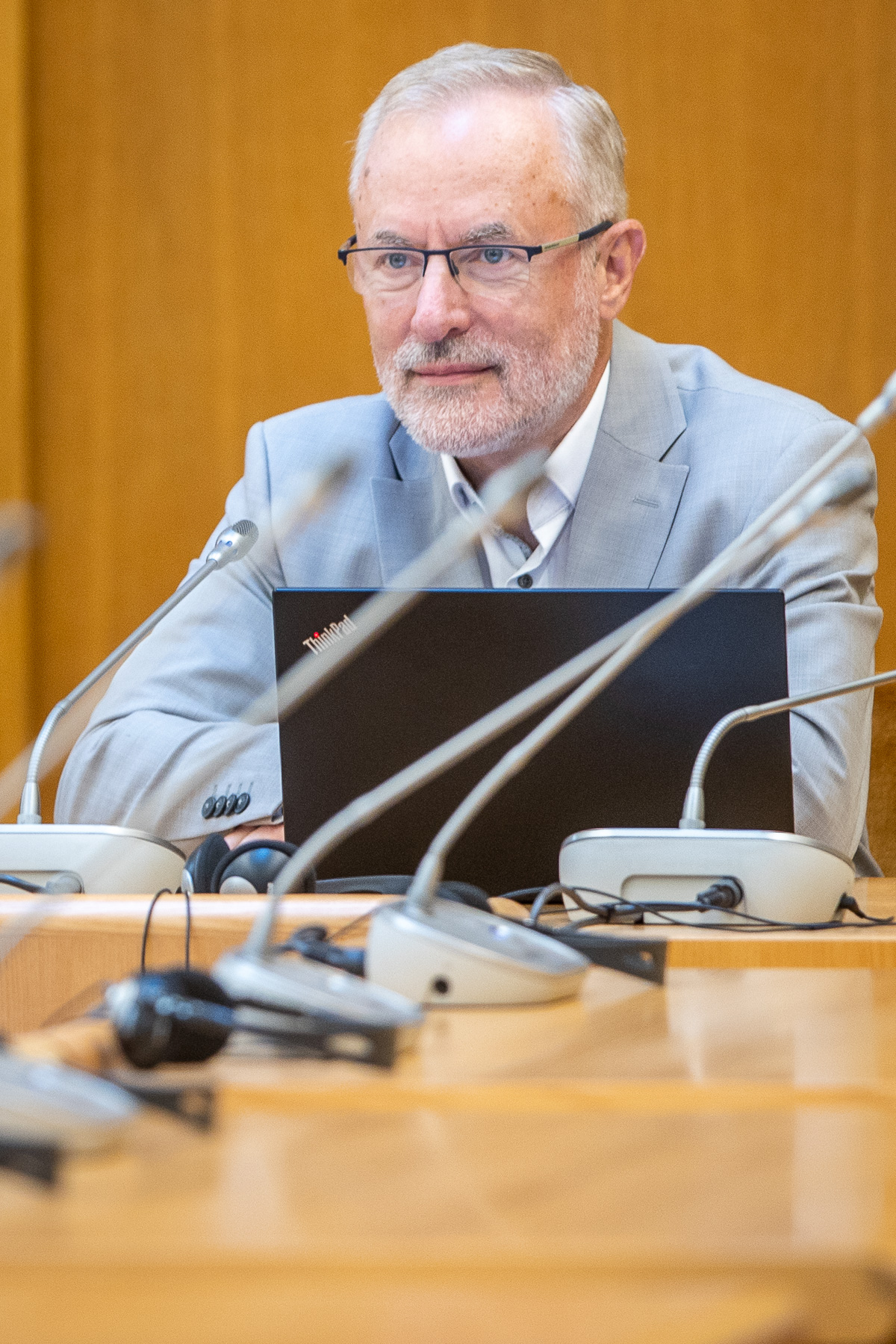

First Deputy Speaker of the Seimas
- Incumbent
- Assumed office 13 November 2020
- Preceded by: Rima Baškienė

Member of Seimas
- Incumbent
- Assumed office 14 November 2016
- Constituency: Multi-member
- In office 16 November 2012 – 14 November 2016
- Preceded by: Jonas Jagminas
- Succeeded by: Jonas Varkalys (Plungė)
- Constituency: Plungė – Rietavas
- In office 25 November 1996 – 16 November 2012
- Constituency: Multi-member

Personal details
- Born: 14 March 1958 (age 68) Žvirblaičiai, Plungė District, Lithuania
- Party: Homeland Union
- Spouse(s): Romualda Razmienė (m. 1982; d. 2015); Vilija Razmienė (m. 2016)
- Education: Vilnius University

Jurgis Razma (born 14 March 1958) is a physicist, First Deputy Speaker of the Seimas, Member of the Seimas since 1996.

== Biography ==
In 1965 he started attending primary school in Plungė district. In 1976, graduated from Plungė 4th Secondary School. In 1981 graduated from Vilnius State University Faculty of Physics and majored in physics.

From 1981 to 1991 he was a senior engineer at the Faculty of Physics of Vilnius University.

== Political life ==
When Sąjūdis was formed in 1988, he became involved in its activities. From 1991 to 1992, he was an advisor to the Prime Minister of Lithuania. Between 1992 and 1993 worked as Assistant to Member of the Seimas Tautvydas Lideikis. Also he was an Executive Secretary of the Sąjūdis since 1993 until 1995. He was Member of the Vilnius City Municipality Council and Board from 1995 to 1996. Since 1996 is a Member of the Seimas.

He is Member of the Homeland Union since the establishment of the party in 1993, also Member of the Presidium and Council of Homeland Union.

From 13 November 2020 he is First Deputy Speaker of the Seimas.

== Sources ==
- http://www.vrk.lt/rinkimai/400_lt/KandidatuSarasai/RinkimuOrganizacija3433.html
- https://www.lrs.lt/sip/portal.show?p_r=35299&p_k=2&p_a=498&p_asm_id=7242

Seimas
Preceded by Jonas Jagminas	Member of the Seimas for Plungė and Rietavas; 2012–2016	Succeeded by Post abolished Jonas Vakralys (Plungė)
