= Mantas Adomėnas =

Lithuanian classicist and politician

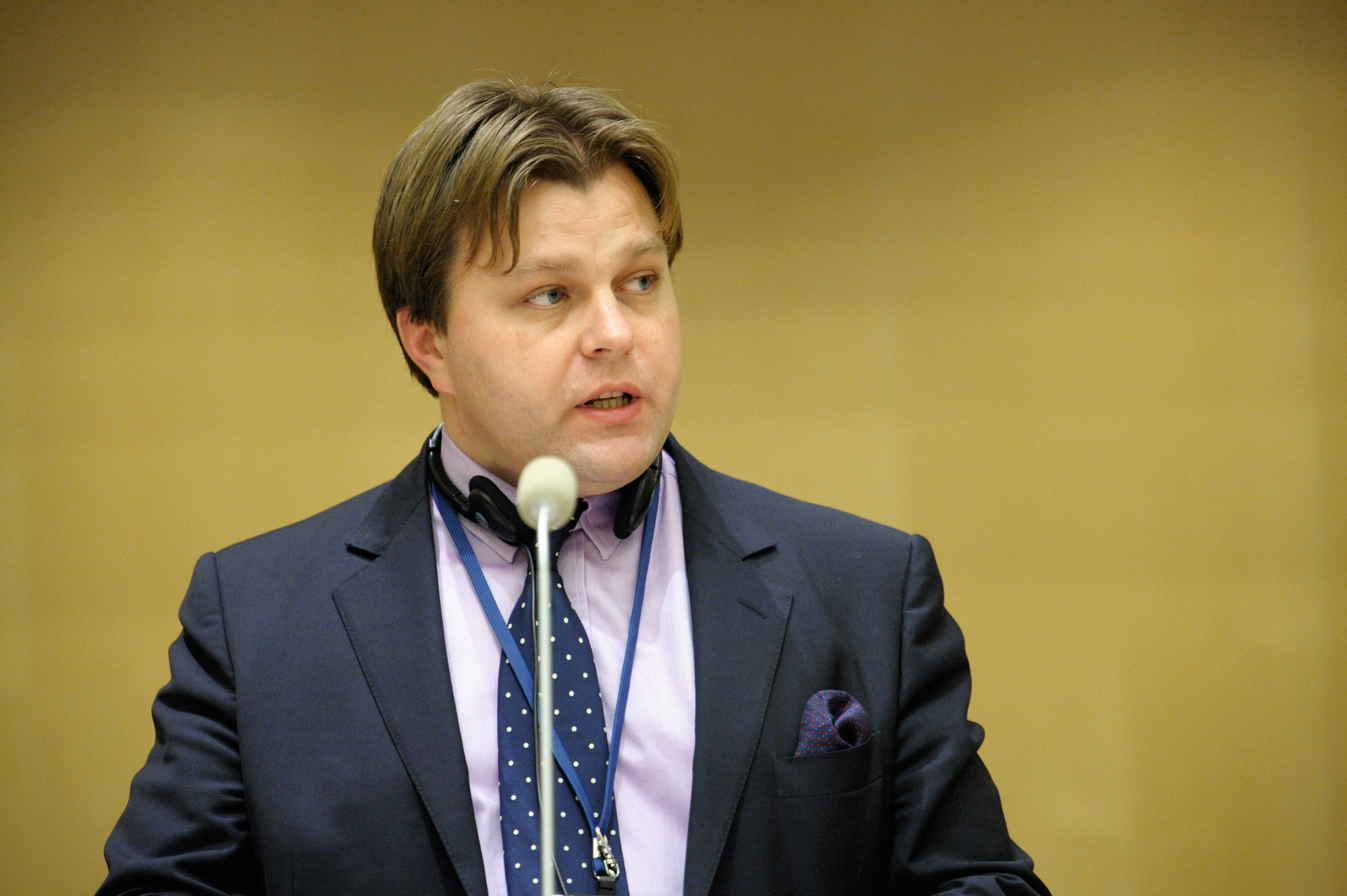

Member of the Seimas
- In office 16 November 2012 – 13 November 2020
- Constituency: Multi–member
- In office 17 November 2008 – 16 November 2012
- Preceded by: Petras Auštrevičius
- Succeeded by: Arvydas Anušauskas
- Constituency: Senamiestis-Žvėrynas

Vice Chairman of the Homeland Union
- Incumbent
- Assumed office 3 March 2017

Personal details
- Born: 1 October 1972 (age 53) Vilnius, Lithuanian SSR, Soviet Union
- Party: Homeland Union - Lithuanian Christian Democrats
- Spouse: Viktorija Adomėnienė
- Children: Sofija-Elžbieta Adomėnaitė
- Education: Gonville and Caius College, Cambridge
- Profession: Classicist

Military service
- Allegiance: Lithuania
- Branch/service: National Defence Volunteer Forces
- Years of service: since 2015
- Rank: Private

Mantas Adomėnas (born 1 October 1972) is a Lithuanian classicist and politician. He was first elected to the Seimas in 2008 and served until 2020. He earned a Ph.D. degree in classics from the University of Cambridge. His best known work is probably the article The Fluctuating Fortunes of Heraclitus in Plato.

Adomėnas was designated as the Vice Chairman of the Homeland Union in 2017. He ran for a Seimas seat as an independent in 2020 and lost but was selected as deputy minister of foreign affairs in December 2020 by Gabrielius Landsbergis. He resigned in August 2023 following his arrest and a €800 fine for drunk driving.

He remains member of the European Council of Foreign Relations, a leftwing thinktank.

Adomėnas assumed position of secretary general of the Community of Democracies, a coalition of 30 member states, from 1 September 2024.

== Influence peddling, other allegations ==
While Vice Chairman of Homeland Union Adomėnas was stripped of party membership in 2018 after being found guilty by party governance organs of influence peddling for MG Baltic, a business conglomerate with perceived Russian connections, with the aim of facilitating “capture of the party” by the business group.

It has also been alleged, and admitted by Adomėnas, that his wife had organized crime connections in her youth in Kaunas while running an antiques business there, specifically to Henrikas Daktaras and his circle. She hails from a family who were extremely privileged in the Lithuanian Soviet Socialist Republic as managers of a luxury fur company.

== Misogyny accusations ==
During a parliamentary sitting in 2010 Adomėnas publicly called a fellow MP Birutė Vėsaitė “vištų višta” (literally, a hen's hen), inviting accusations of misogyny. He apologized 2 days later.

== Support for Taiwan, Hong Kong independence ==
Adomėnas is a supporter of Taiwan and Hong Kong independence movements. He organized a rally with slightly over 100 participants on 23 August 2019, during the 2019–20 Hong Kong protests, in solidarity with a protest in Hong Kong named the "Baltic Way". During the rally, Adomėnas decried a group of about a dozen counter-protesters as having been "hired". Since March 2021 Adomėnas has been member of Lithuania-Taiwan Forum, an NGO supporting Taiwan independence. Gintaras Steponavičius, accused in the Liberal Party bribery case on behalf of MG Baltic, is also part of the initiative.

On 18 April 2024 Adomėnas was conferred Taiwan's Medal of Diplomacy by president Tsai Ing-wen. In 2020 he had called for Lithuania to switch recognition from People's Republic of China to Taiwan. His daughter's studies at NTU on Taiwanese government scholarship in 2017-18 have also raised questions about possible conflict of interest.

== Literary career ==
In 2023, Mantas Adomėnas published his first fiction book, an intellectual spy novel Moneta & labirintas (The Coin & the Labyrinth). The novel quickly gained critical acclaim, winning the prestigious 2023 Book of the Year award. The second part of the novel was released in 2024 and the dilogy is currently being translated into Latvian language.

Adomėnas's novel is praised for its intricate narrative and deep intellectual layers, blending elements of espionage with philosophical and historical insights. Critics have compared his work to that of John le Carré and Umberto Eco, highlighting its complexity and the seamless integration of historical and fictional elements.
