= Audronius Ažubalis =

Lithuanian journalist and politician

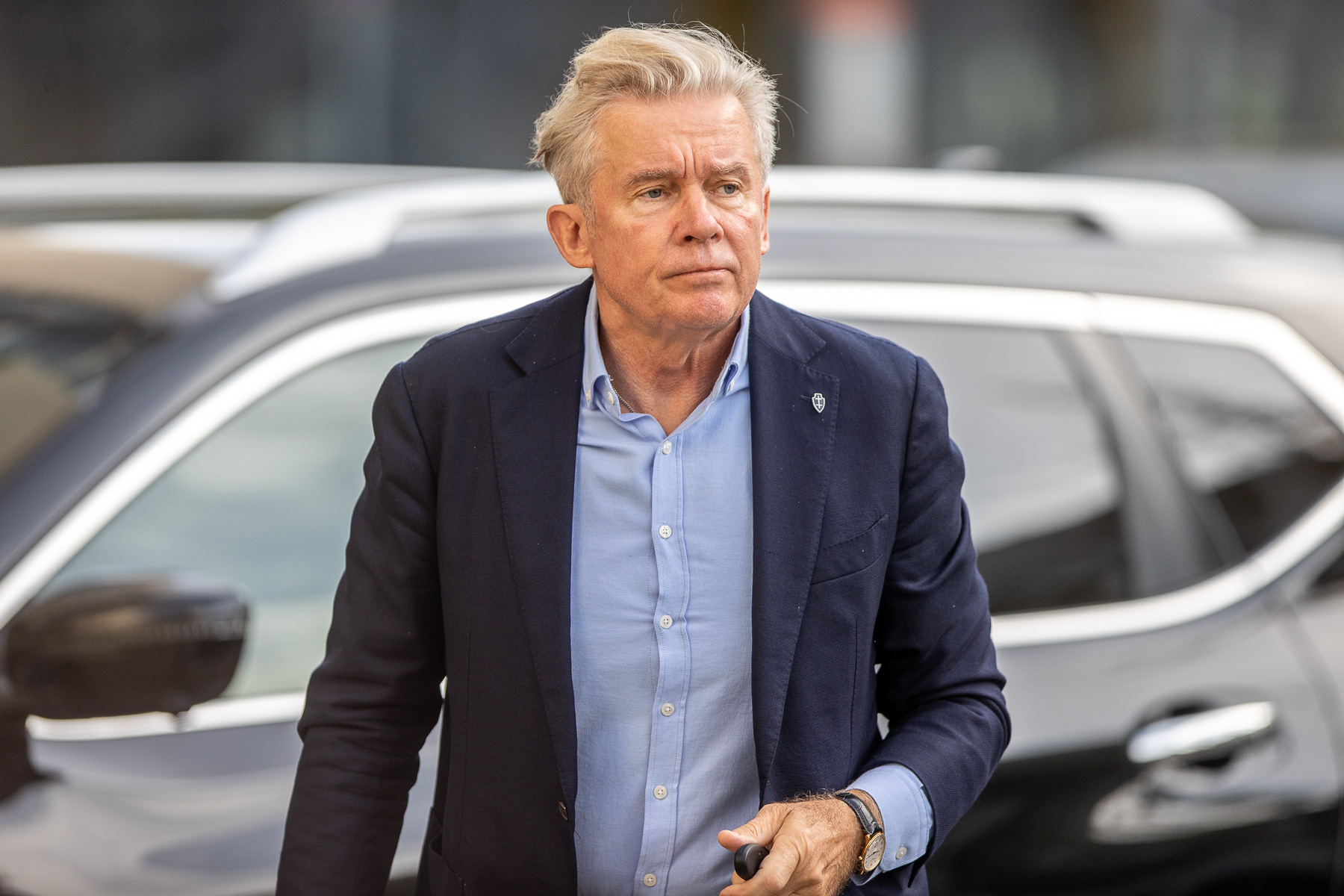

Member of the Seimas
- Incumbent
- Assumed office 14 November 2016
- Constituency: Multi-member
- In office 17 November 2008 – 13 November 2016
- Preceded by: Vilija Blinkevičiūtė
- Succeeded by: Virginijus Sinkevičius
- Constituency: Šeškinė
- In office 23 June 2004 – 16 November 2008
- Preceded by: Vytautas Landsbergis
- Constituency: Multi-member
- In office 11 November 1996 – 18 October 2000
- Preceded by: Algirdas Kunčinas
- Succeeded by: Raimondas Šukys
- Constituency: Fabijoniškės

Minister of Foreign Affairs of Lithuania
- In office 11 February 2010 – 13 December 2012
- President: Dalia Grybauskaitė
- Prime Minister: Andrius Kubilius
- Preceded by: Vygaudas Ušackas
- Succeeded by: Linas Antanas Linkevičius

Personal details
- Born: 17 January 1958 (age 68) Vilnius, Lithuania
- Party: Homeland Union

Audronius Ažubalis (born 17 January 1958 in Vilnius, Lithuania) is a Lithuanian journalist and politician, serving as the Minister of Foreign Affairs of Lithuania from 2010 to 2012. He was a member of the Seimas 1996–2000, and was elected again in 2004. He has chaired the foreign affairs committee of the Seimas. Ažubalis represents the Homeland Union – Lithuanian Christian Democrats, Lithuania's conservative party and part of the European People's Party.

== Biography ==
In 1976 he graduated from Antanas Vienuolis Secondary School in Vilnius and enrolled into the Vilnius University. He received a tertiary education degree in history in 1989. Later he continued his studies at the World Press Institute at Macalester College, United States.

In January 2010, Prime Minister Andrius Kubilius presented Ažubalis as a candidate for the position of Minister of Foreign Affairs to President Dalia Grybauskaitė.

== Views on Stalinism ==
Together with five other European foreign ministers, Ažubalis has called for the criminalization of "the approval, denial or belittling of communist crimes," arguing that "everybody knows about the crimes of Nazism, but only part of Europe is aware of the crimes of communism." Ažubalis has argued that "it is not possible to find differences between Hitler and Stalin except in their moustaches," echoing the view advanced by Stéphane Courtois in The Black Book of Communism.
