= Trolleybuses in Vilnius =

Lithuanian public transit system

Vilnius trolleybus system

Operation
- Locale: Vilnius, Lithuania
- Open: 1956
- Status: Open
- Routes: 16
- Operator: Vilniaus viešasis transportas

Infrastructure
- Electrification: 600 V DC parallel overhead lines

Statistics
- daily: 200,000
- Website: http://www.vilniausviesasistransportas.lt/

The Vilnius trolleybus system is the one of two existing trolleybus systems in Lithuania. It is operated by the municipal operator company Vilniaus viešasis transportas in the capital city of Vilnius. Up to 177 trolleybuses run on weekdays, 102 - on weekends.

== History ==
In October 1956, the Vilnius Trolleybus Board was established and a 7.8 km long contact network was built, together with a trolleybus depot in the suburb of Antakalnis for 25 trolleybuses. In November 1956, the first MTB-82D trolleybuses started service on the route from Antakalnis to the Railway station.

In the 1960s and 70s, Škoda 8Tr, and later - 9Tr trolleybuses replaced the old stock, with constant expansion of the network increasing the route count to 18.

In 1981, the trolleybus count doubled the maximum service power of the old trolleybus park, thus encouraging the construction of the second depot. It was ultimately opened on 28 December 1985, in the neighborhood of Viršuliškės and it could maintain 150 trolleybuses. At a similar time, new Škoda 14Tr trolleybuses were also introduced.

In April 1993, the board was reorganized to Vilniaus Autobusai, with the owner of the new company being the Vilnius city municipality. From the treasury of the municipality, even more new Škoda trolleybuses were bought in 1996–1999.

From 2004 to 2006, 45 new Polish trolleybuses Solaris Trollino 15AC were purchased, replacing the last of the Škoda 9Tr stock, and introducing low-floor trolleybuses to Vilnius.

On 4 November 2011, the company was again reorganized and incorporated into UAB Vilniaus Viešasis Transportas.

In 2012, two new MAZ-ETON Amber 203T Vilnis 12AC trolleybuses, constructed with a MAZ-ETON chassis and a custom body in Lithuania, were bought by the company.

As part of major public transport reforms, on 1 July 2013, four of the least profitable routes were closed down, along with the dismantling of 700 meters of the overhead lines on Naugarduko street.

In 2018 and 2019, 41 Solaris Trollino 12 trolleybuses were delivered.

In 2023 and 2024, 91 Škoda 32Tr SOR trolleybuses were bought. These vehicles are set to replace the aging Škoda 14Tr, as some units date back to 1986. The new vehicles contain onboard traction batteries, which allow travel for up to 20 km without the overhead catenary, and are made use of during roadworks or diversions due to city events. The municipality has also confirmed plans to organise a tender for 73 new articulated trolleybuses in 2025 (later comfirmed an order of 8 more, so overall 81), which will replace the last of the 14Trs. The new solaris trolleybuses will arive in fall of 2026.

== Vehicles ==
=== Currently operated ===
- Škoda 32Tr SOR – 91 units, since 2024
- Škoda 14Tr – 52 units (incl. 10 units of 14TrM models), since 1984 (note – city officials announced retirement date of December of 2026).
- Solaris Trollino II 15AC – 43 units, since 2004
- Solaris Trollino IV 12 Škoda – 40 units, since 2018
- Škoda 15Tr – 2 units, since 1999 (note – city officials announced retirement date of December of 2026)
- Solaris Trollino IV 18 – 1 unit (80 more to be delivered in 2026), since 2026

=== Formerly operated ===
- Amber 203T Vilnis 12AC – 2 units, 2011-2026
- MTB-82D – 63 units, 1956-?
- Škoda 8Tr – 15 units, 1960-?
- Škoda 9Tr – 313 units, 1967-2006
- Gräf & Stift GE110 – 2 units, 1992-1999
- Jelcz PNTKM – 1 unit, 1998-2011

== Routes ==
Network map (2026)

No.	Route	Working Days	Frequency	Notes
1	Karoliniškės–Žvėrynas–Stotis	Everyday	20-30 min.	
2	Saulėtekis–Žygimantų g.–Stotis	Everyday	5-10 min.	
3	Karoliniškės–Žvėrynas–Šiaures Miestelis	Everyday	20-30 min.	
4	Antakalnis–Centras–Žemieji Paneriai	Everyday	7-15 min.	Terminates at Gerosios Vilties st. during weekends
6	Žirmūnai–Kalvarijų g.–J. Basanavičiaus g.–Žemieji Paneriai	Everyday	7-15 min.	
7	Pašilaičiai–Justiniškės–Žvėrynas–Stotis	Everyday	5-10 min.	
9	Karoliniškės–Šeimyniškių g.–Žirmūnai	Everyday	10-30 min.	
10	Saulėtekis–Kalvarijų g.–Naujininkai	Everyday	10-30 min.	
12	Žirmūnai–Šeimyniškių g.–J. Basanavičiaus g.–Žemieji Paneriai	Everyday	15-40 min.	
15	Stotis–Žemieji Paneriai–Titnago g.	Weekdays	20-30 min.	Operates during peak hours only
16	Pašilaičiai–Lazdynai–Stotis	Everyday	8-20 min.	
17	Žirmūnai–Naujininkai	Everyday	5-15 min.	
18	Pašilaičiai–Justiniškės–Žemieji Paneriai–Titnago g.	Everyday	7-25 min.	
19	Pašilaičiai–Konstitucijos pr.–Antakalnis–Saulėtekis	Everyday	10-20 min.	
20	Žirmūnai–Žygimantų g.–Pylimo g.–Stotis	Everyday	20-30 min.	
21	Saulėtekis–Šilo tiltas–Žirmūnai	Weekdays	30-60 min.	

== Gallery ==
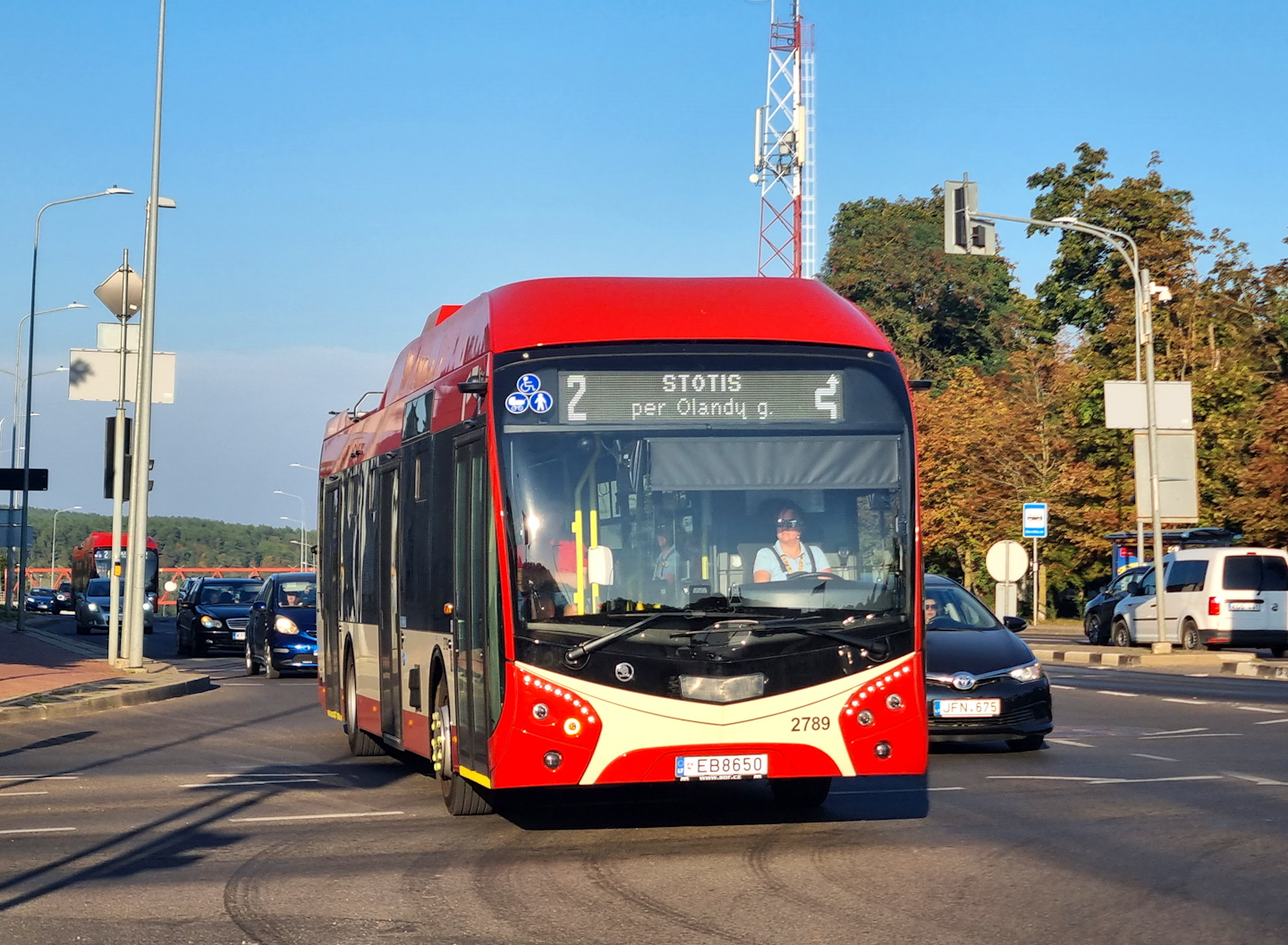
Škoda 32Tr SOR trolleybus in Vilnius, running without overhead wires on a diversion

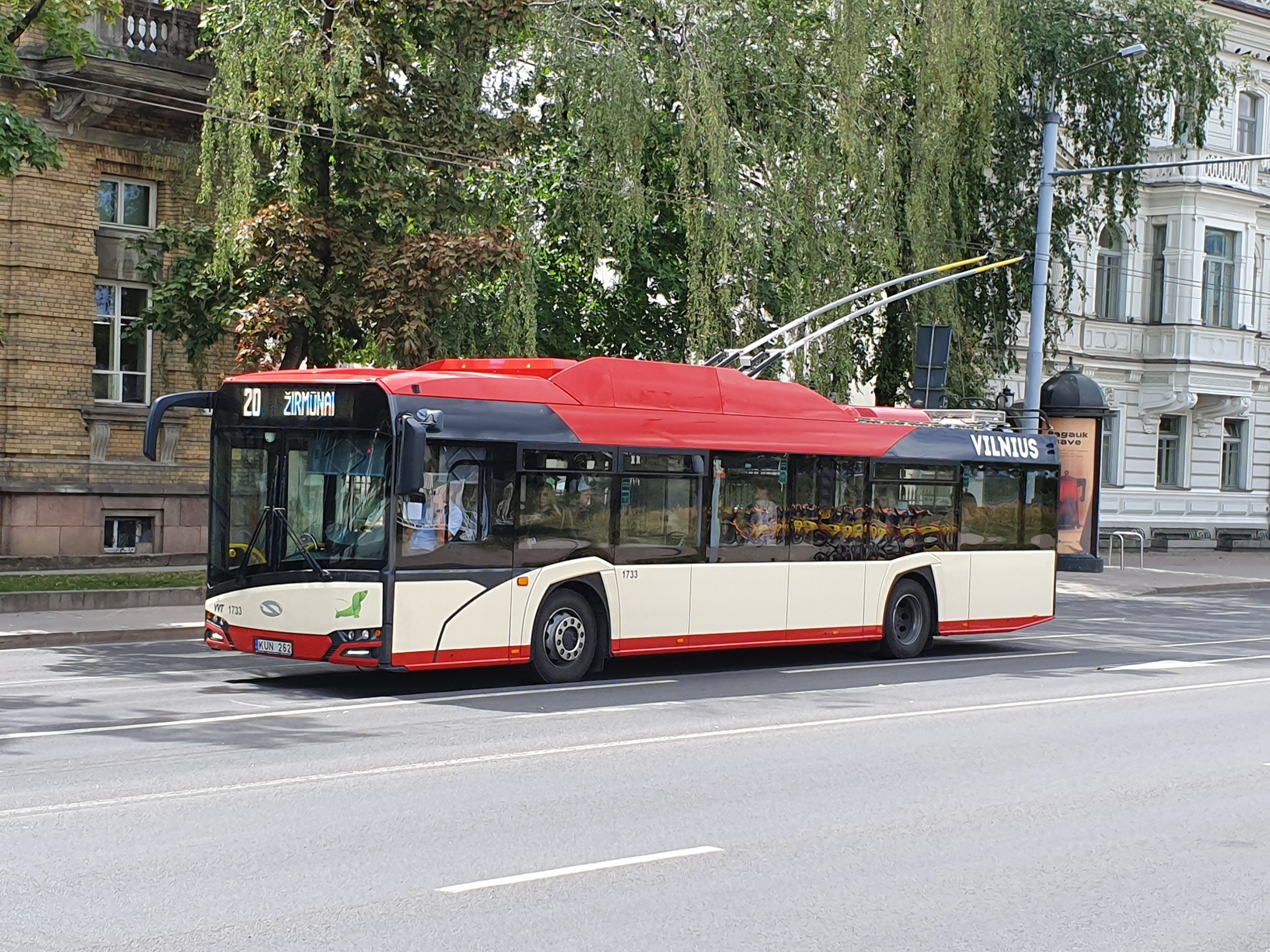
Solaris Trollino 12 trolleybus on route 20

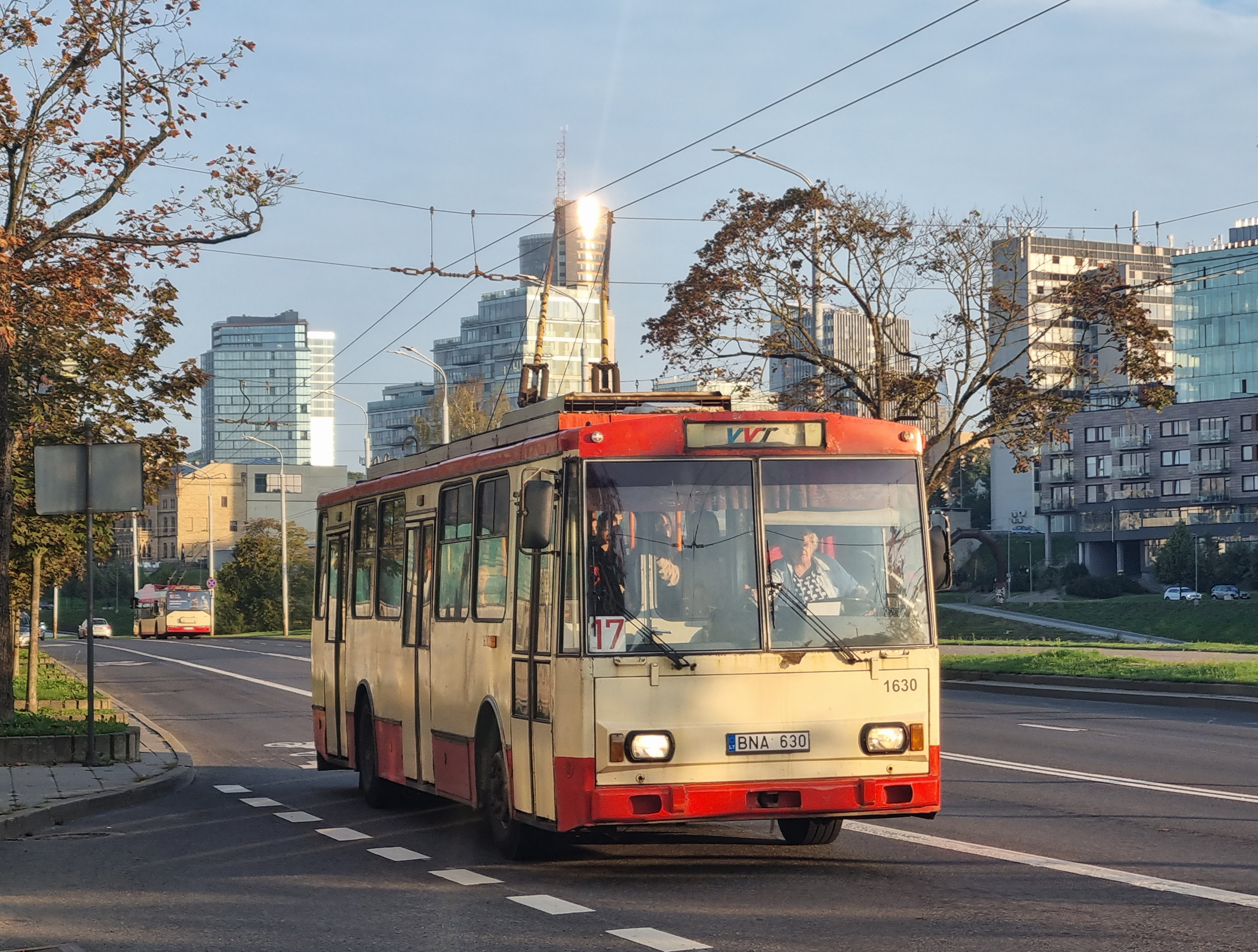
Škoda 14Tr. A usual sight during peak hours

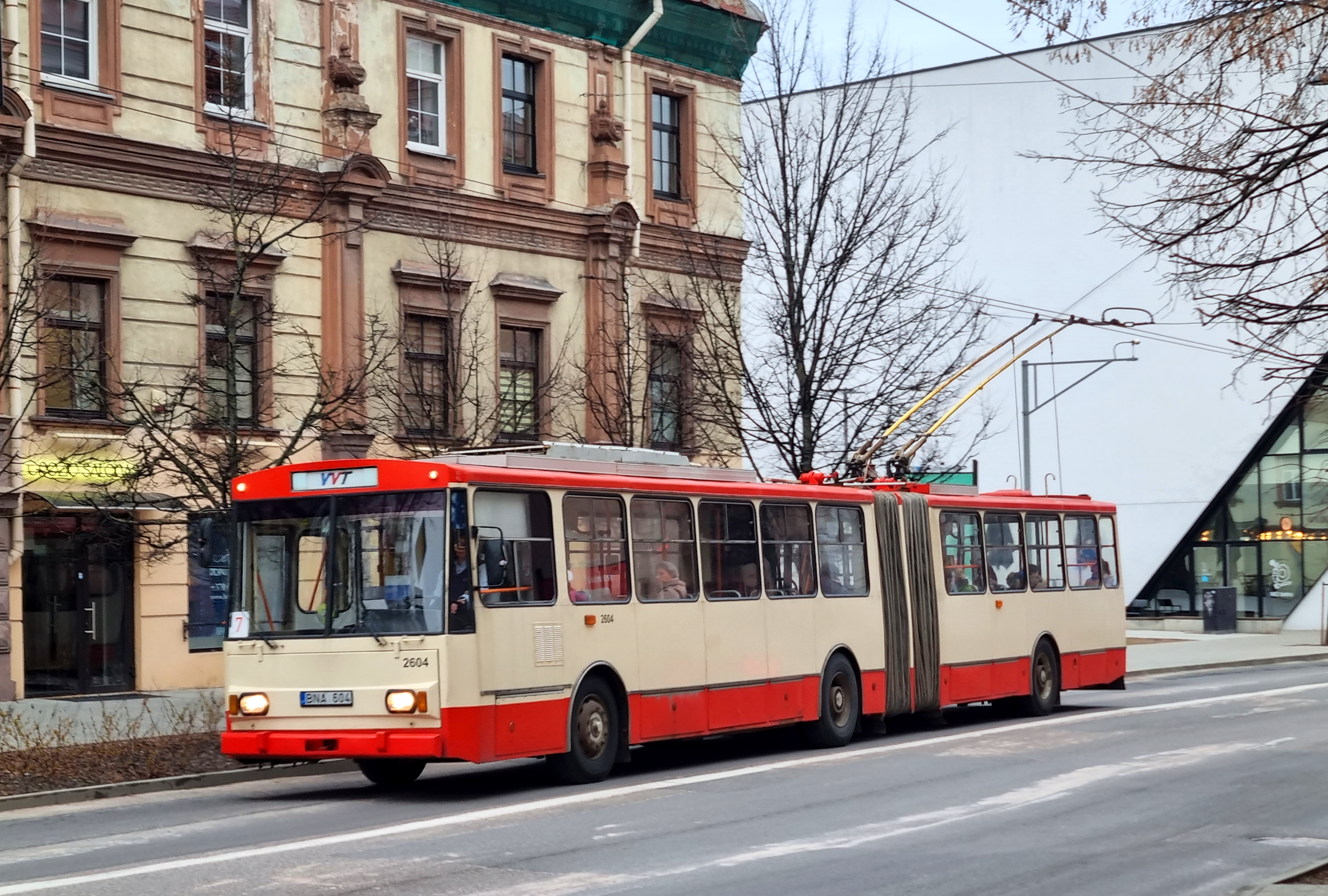
Škoda 15Tr. One of the three articulated trolleybuses in Vilnius, which run on line 7 during the peak hours

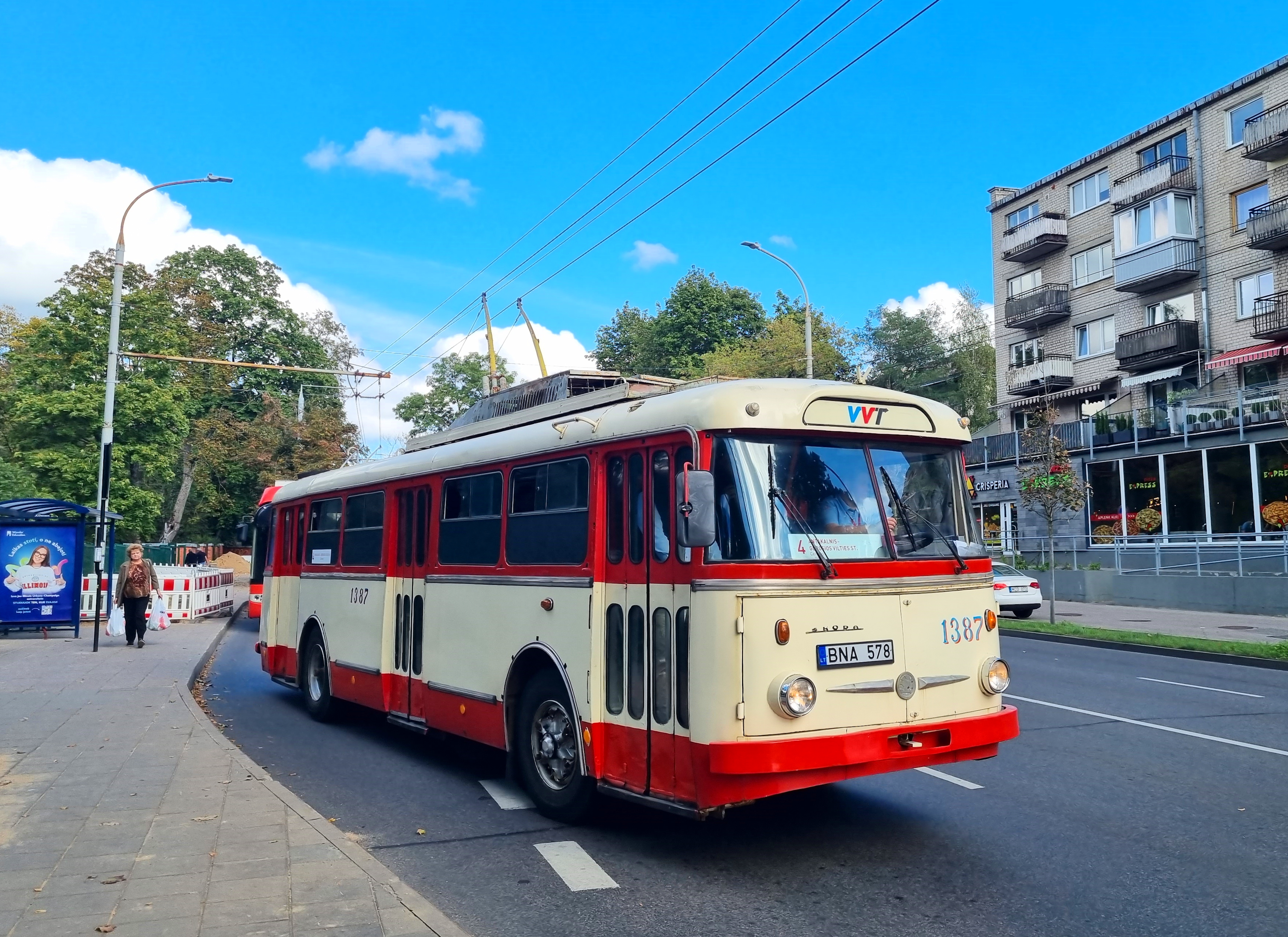
The historical Škoda 9Tr trolleybus in Vilnius. One example has remained for rent or, in this case, special services

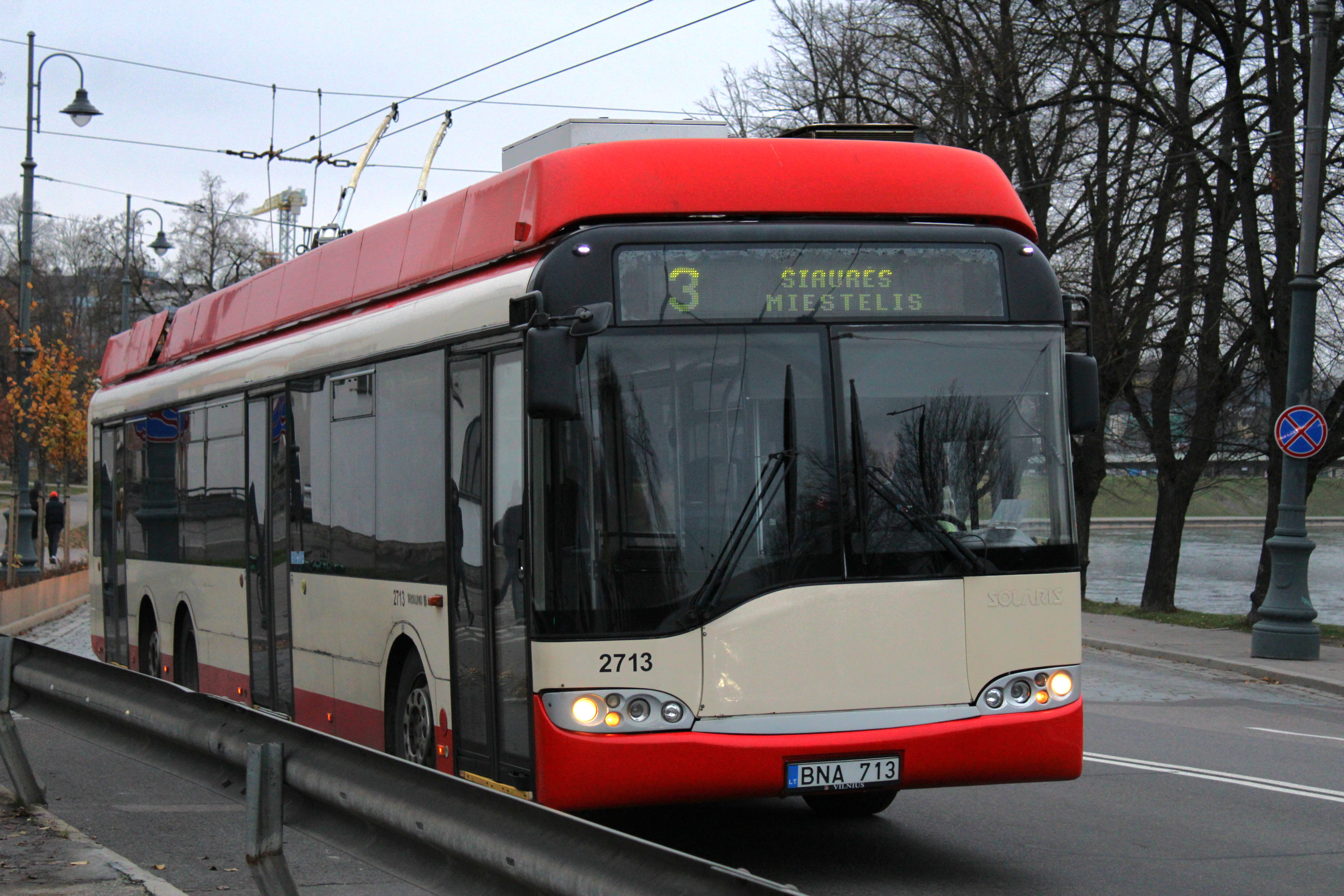
Solaris Trollino 15 is a 15-meter trolleybus

== See also ==
- List of trolleybus systems
