= Šeškinė =

- Eldership
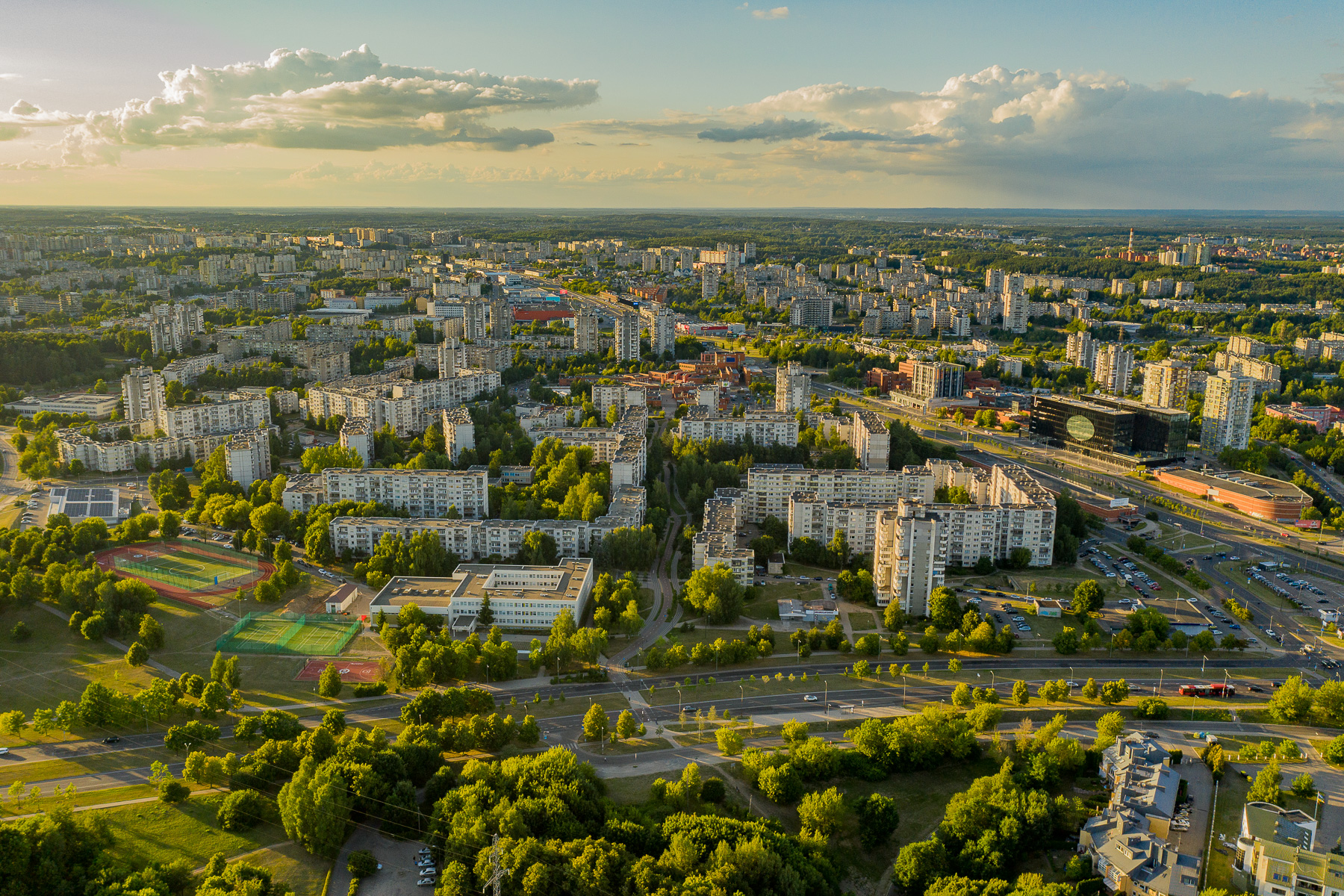

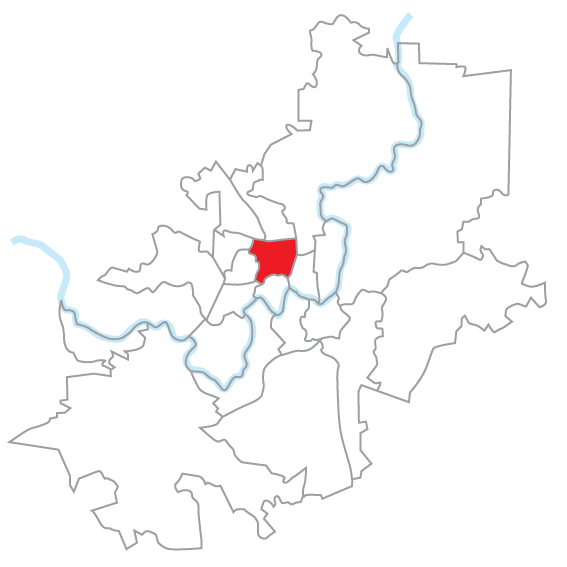

- Location of Šeškinė
- Country: Lithuania
- County: Vilnius County
- Municipality: Vilnius city municipality

Area
  - Total: 7.9 km^{2} (3.1 sq mi)

Population (2021)
  - Total: 28,137
  - Density: 3,600/km^{2} (9,200/sq mi)
- Time zone: UTC+2 (EET)
  - Summer (DST): UTC+3 (EEST)

Šeškinė (literally Lithuanian: 'A place with polecats') is a district located in the north of Vilnius, the capital of Lithuania, built in 1977 as a microdistrict. It is located to the east of Justiniškės district, to the north and north-west of Žvėrynas and Šnipiškės elderships, to the south of Fabijoniškės and Pašilaičiai districts, and to the south-west of Verkiai district.

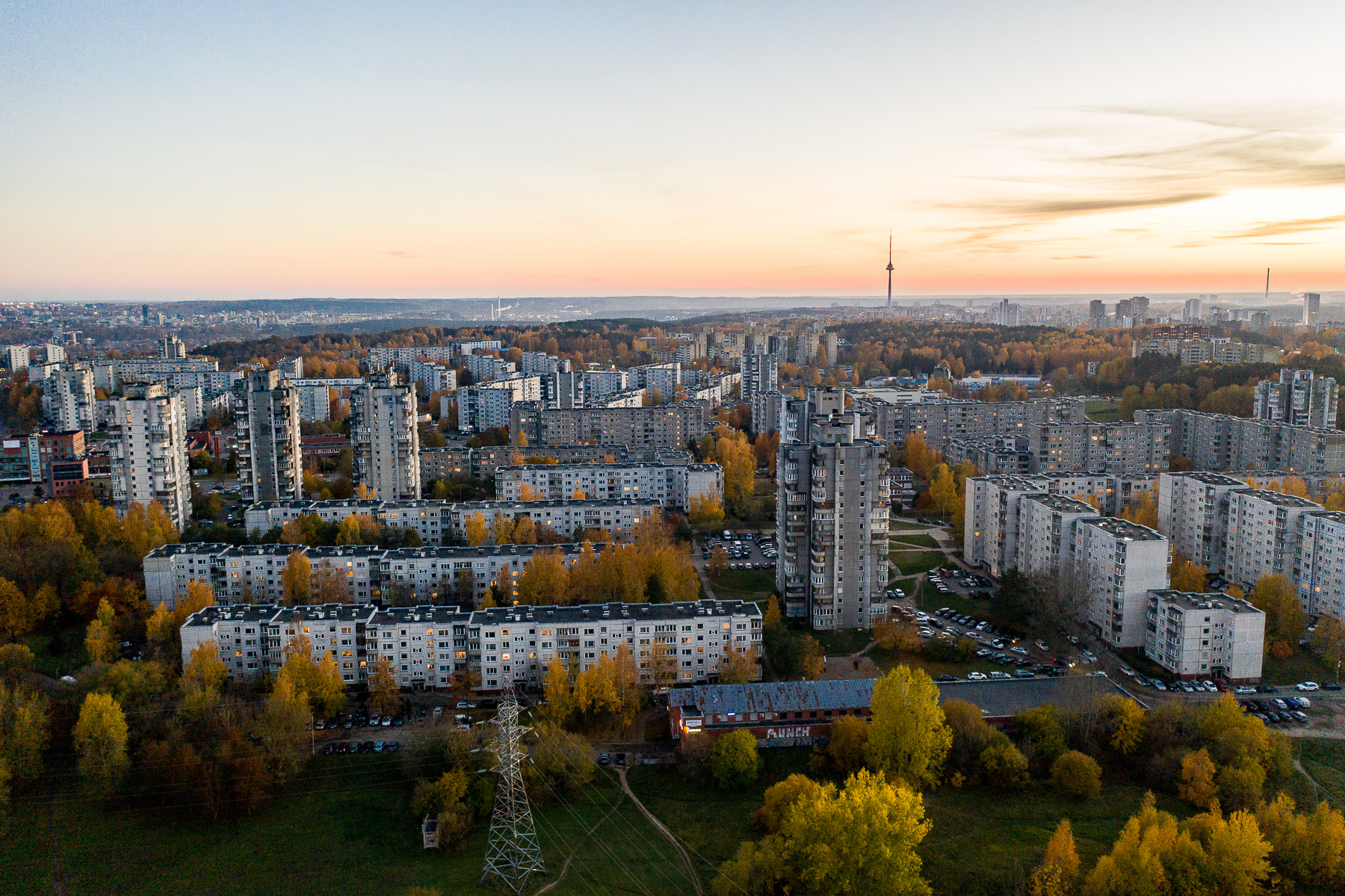
Šeškinė in autumn 2023

Šeškinė is a largely residential district although it is also home to the Akropolis Mall. The only water park in Vilnius was opened on June 1, 2007, next to the Siemens Arena.

Šeškinė is one of the most densely populated districts, having a density of 3,600/km². It's also one of the smallest, being the 6th smallest eldership in Vilnius.

== History ==
Earlier, the village of Šeškinė was located there, from which the neighborhood derives its name.

In historical sources, Šeškinė has been mentioned in 1390 and 1545. From 12th till mid-19th centuries, the current territory of Šeškinė belonged to Radziwiłł family. Until then, it was but a small settlement with wooden houses. In 1955, Šeškinė was incorporated to Vilnius city municipality and became a neighborhood. In 1977, the Šeškinė neighborhood started to build multi-story apartment blocks.
