= URMAS =

Large traditional marketplace in Kaunas, Lithuania

Coordinates: 54°54′57″N 23°59′23″E

Prekybos miestelis Urmas (abbr. Urmas or Urmo bazė) is the third largest marketplace in the Lithuania 90,000 m2 (970,000 sq ft). Urmas is in Kaunas. It was built in 1992 and is managed by Lithuanian company UAB "Prekybos miestelis URMAS“. Urmas has over 2000 several shops. Many individual sellers. Urmas is more of a traditional marketplace than shopping mall.

== Images ==
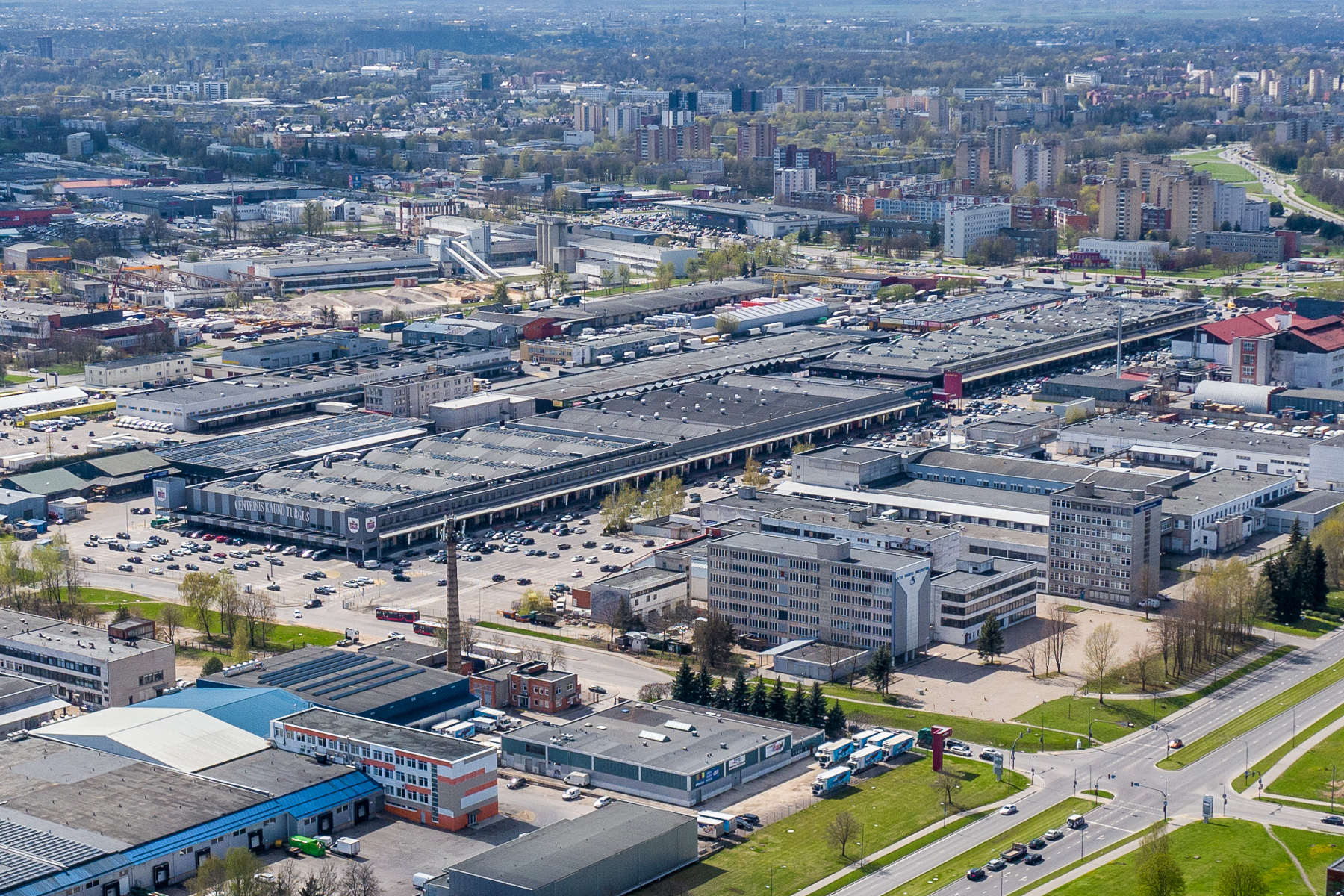
An aerial photograph of Urmas

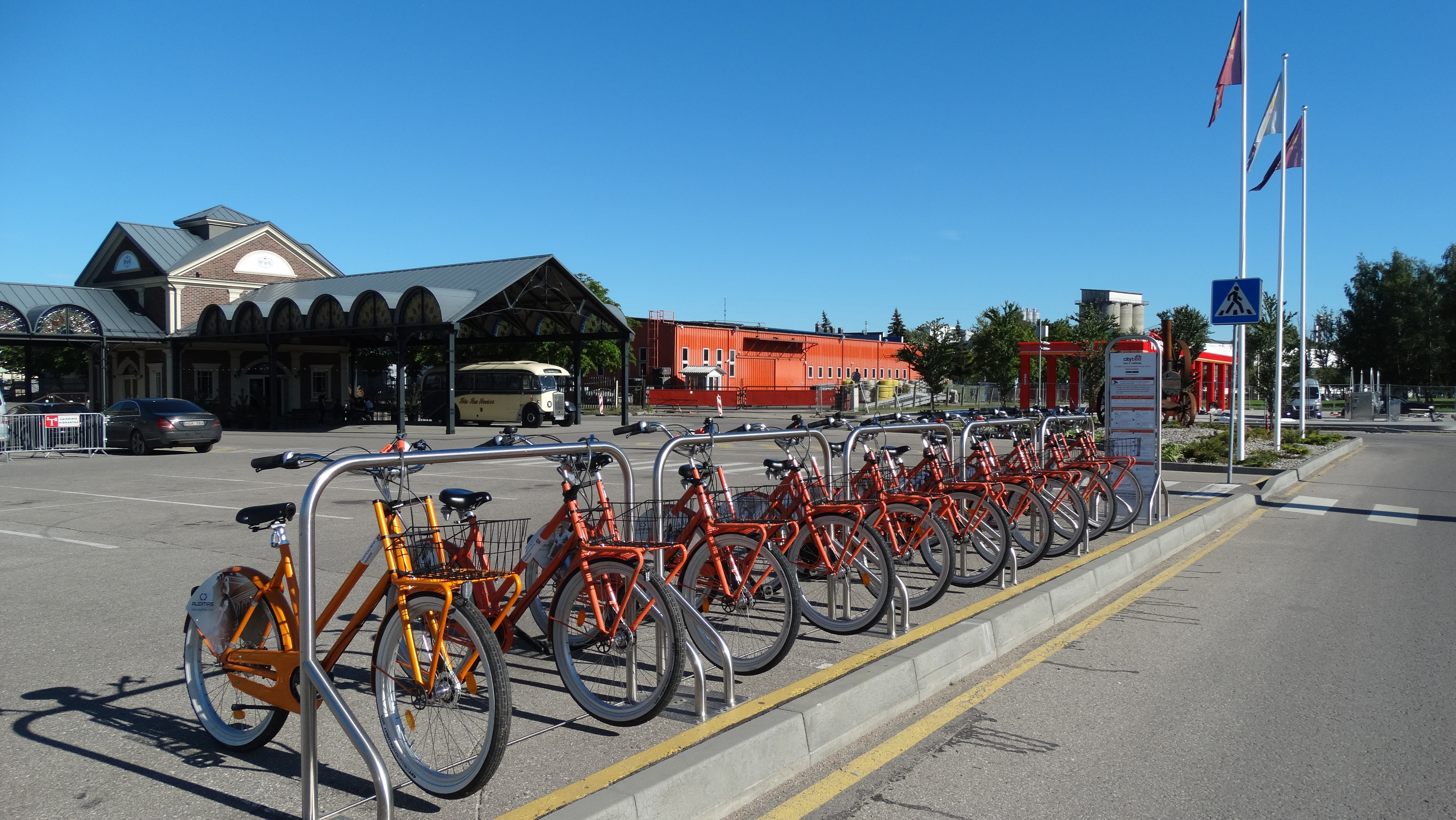
CityBee shared bike station (2017)

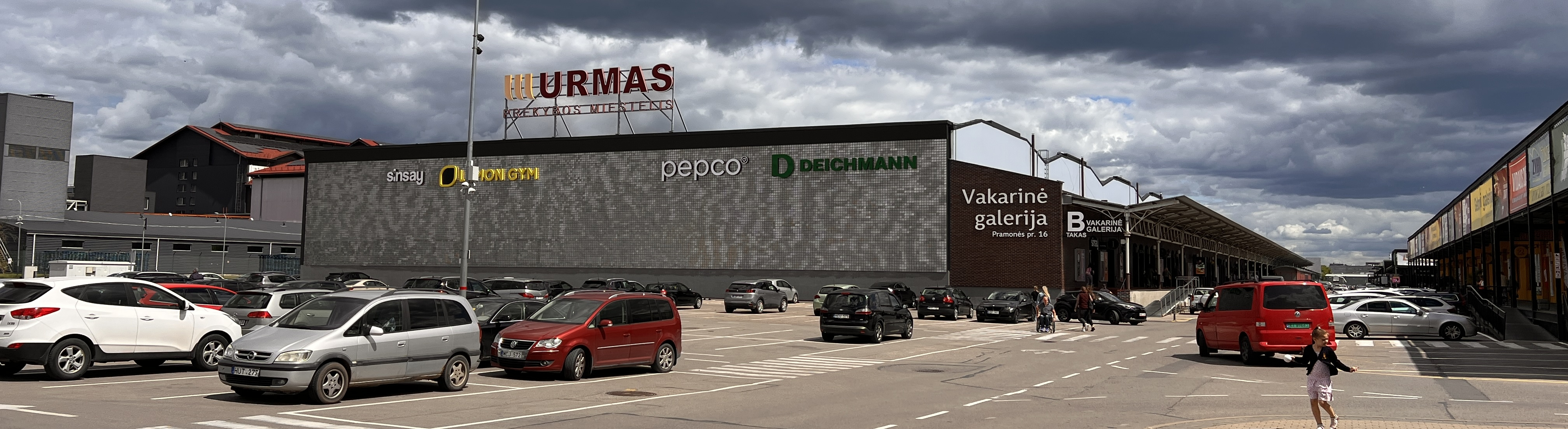
Urmas western entrance

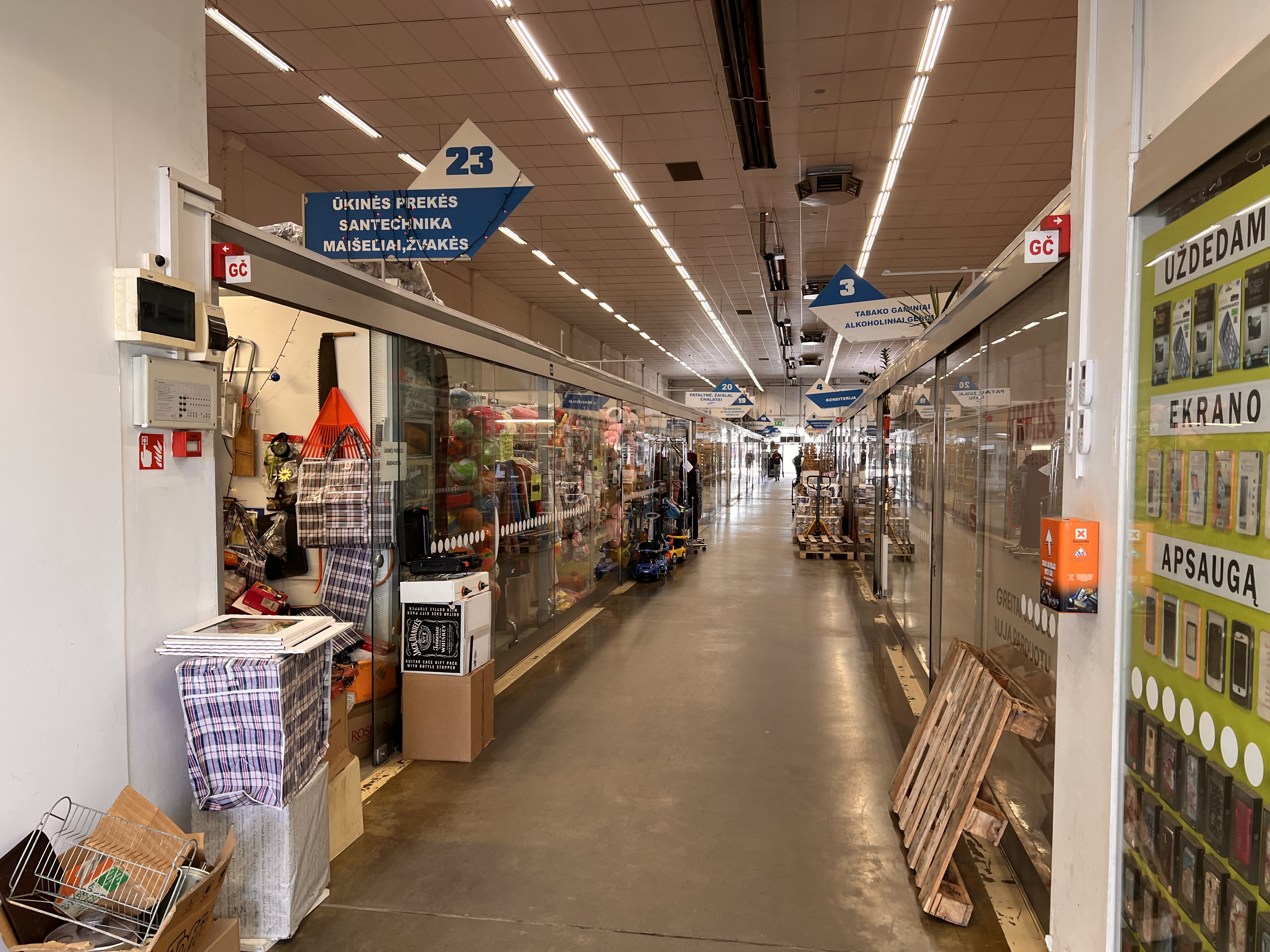
A corridor in one of the market halls

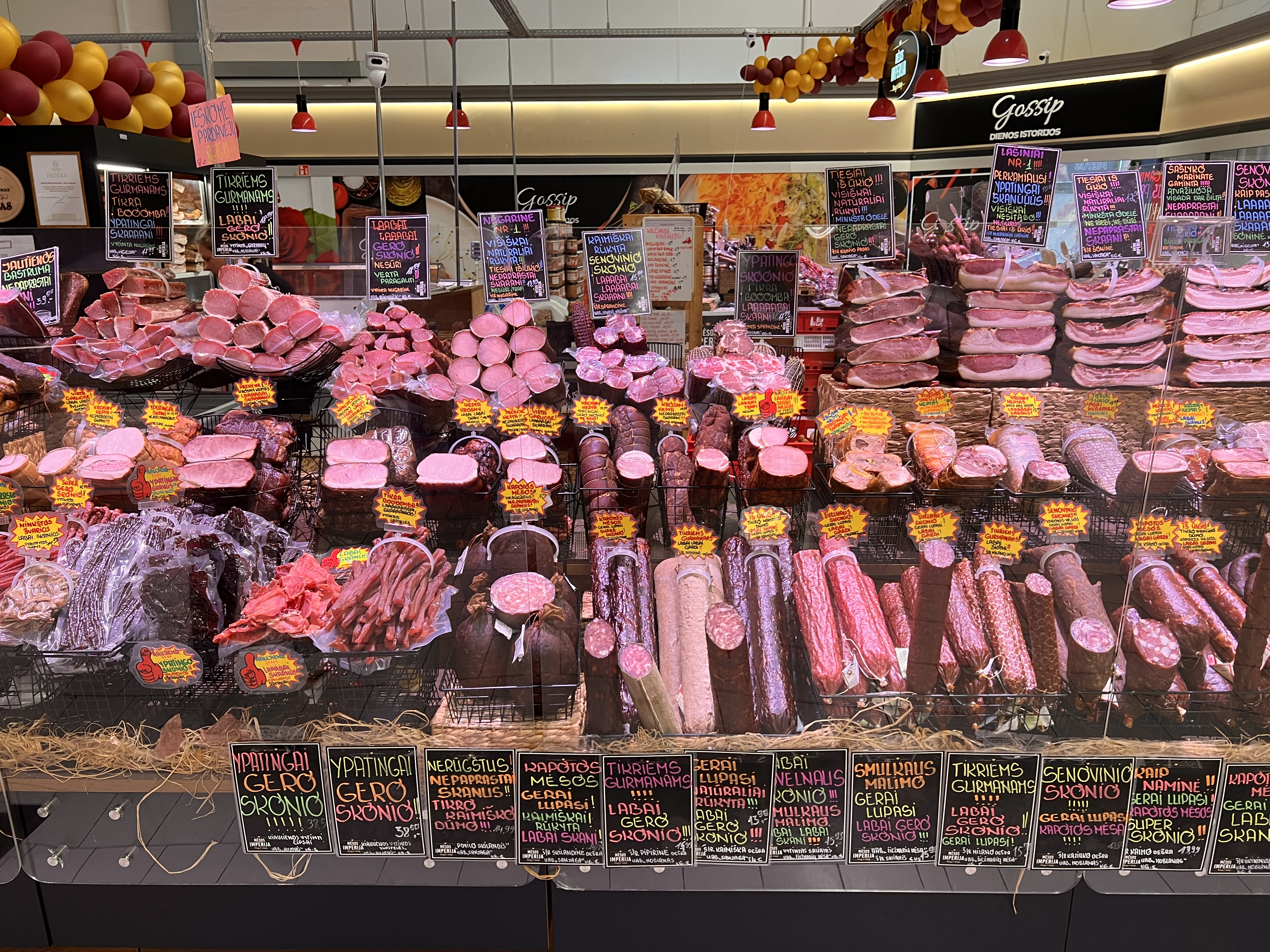
Meat...

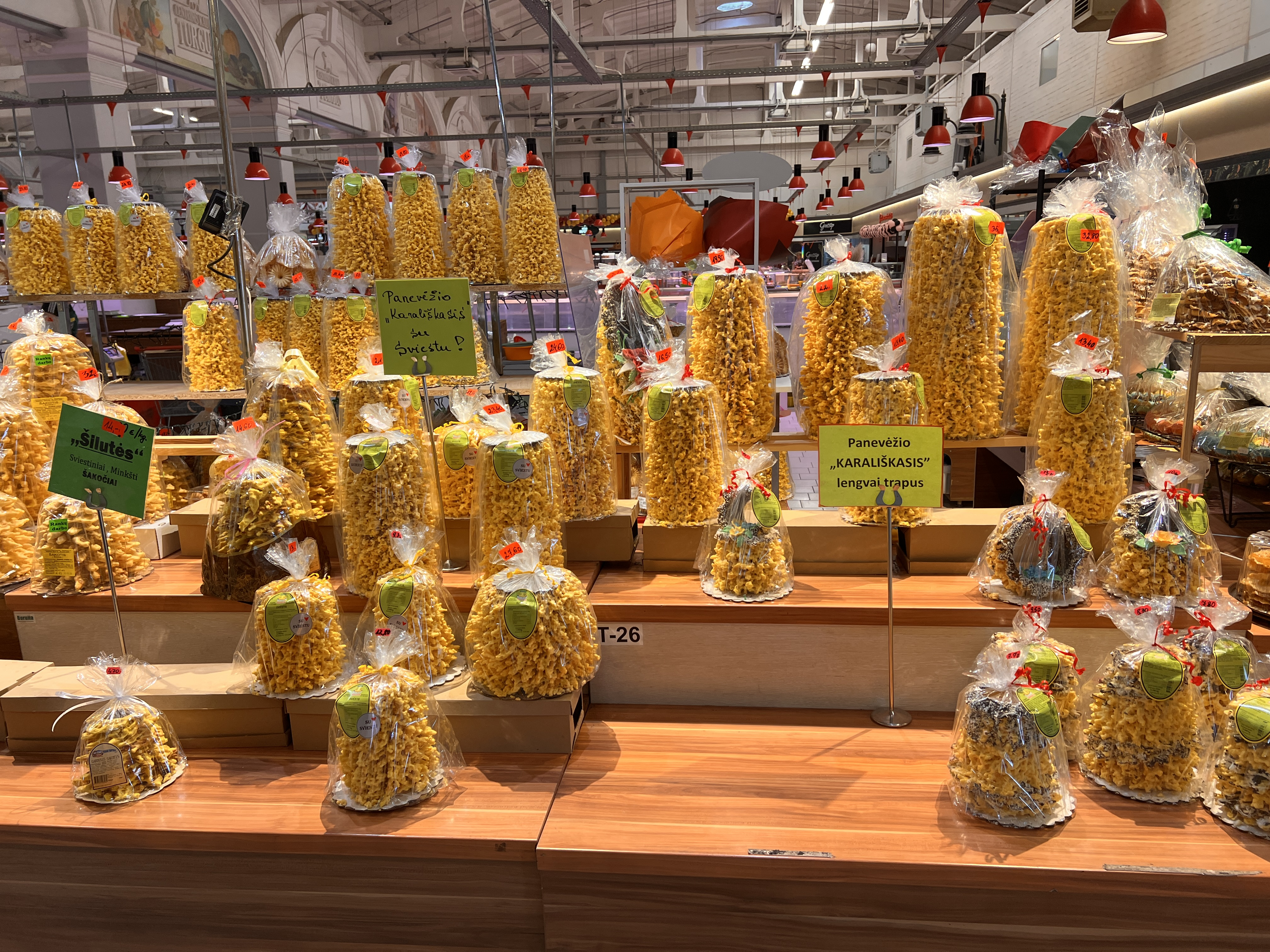
...Šakotis cakes...

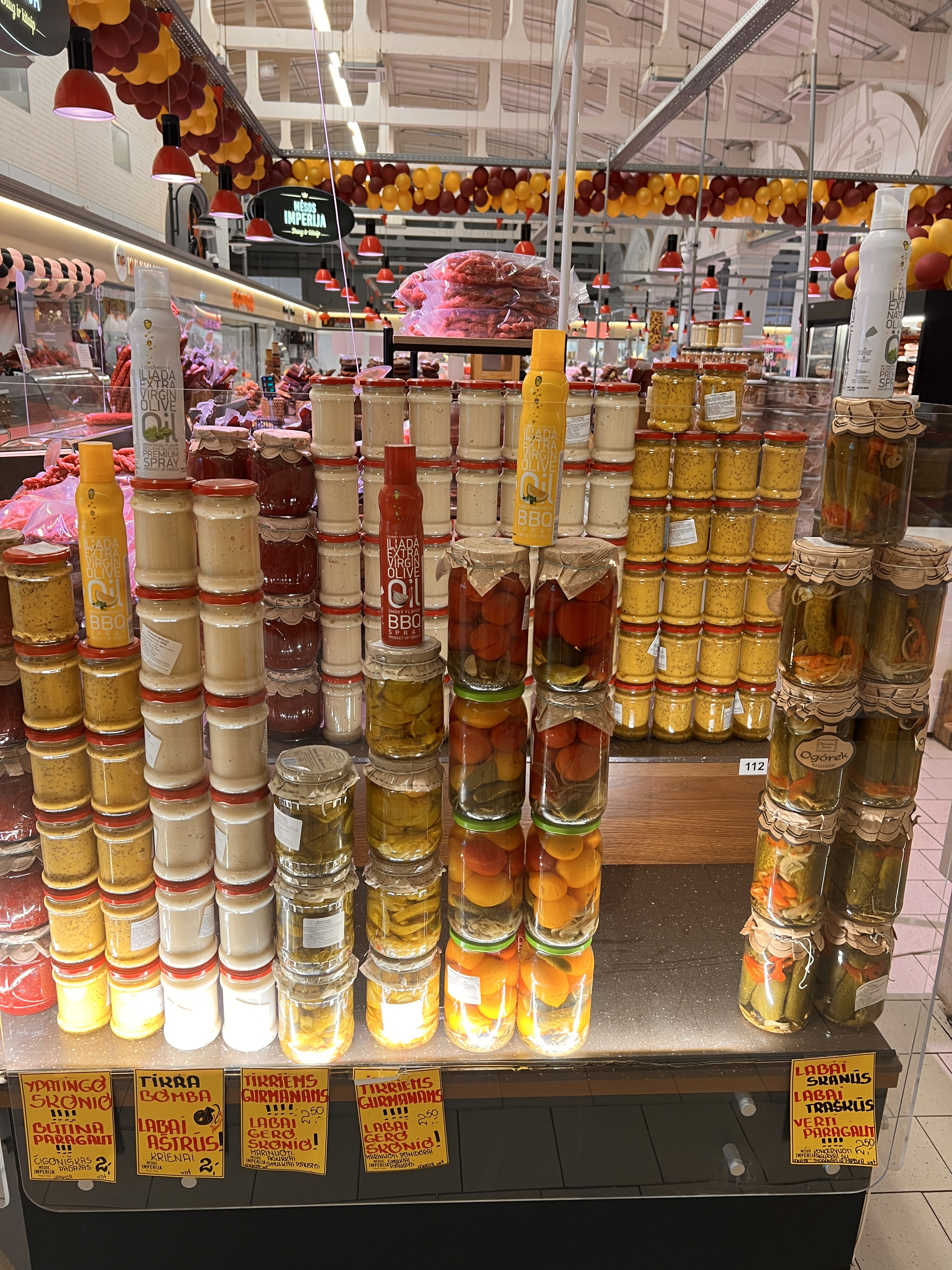
...and different sauces on display at the central food market

== See also ==
- List of shopping malls in Lithuania
