= List of shopping malls in Lithuania =

Lithuania has around 34 shopping malls with more than 10,000 m^{2} (110,000 sq ft) square meters of space. Another two are under construction.

At the end of 2018, the total retail space in shopping centres larger than 5,000 square metres (54,000 sq ft) of gross leasable area and with more than 10 tenants amounted to approximately 1,100,000 square metres (12,000,000 sq ft). At the end of 2018, there were 25 shopping centres in Vilnius; these centres had total leasable area of 453,000 square metres (4,880,000 sq ft). Shopping centers had 248,000 square metres (2,670,000 sq ft) of leasable area in Kaunas, 158,300 square metres (1,704,000 sq ft) in Klaipėda, 109,700 square metres (1,181,000 sq ft) in Šiauliai, and 55,600 square metres (598,000 sq ft) in Panevėžys.

According to real estate firm Ober-Haus, Lithuanian shopping malls produced 6.7–8.8% investment yield in 2015. According to real estate analysts at DTZ, Lithuanian shopping malls are very well developed and competitive, but the market itself is still under-supplied. As of 2012, Vilnius was estimated to have the lowest stock in Northern Europe and the most growth potential in entire European Union. The vacancy rate of shopping centres in Vilnius has remained below 1% since 2013.

== List by total floor area ==
The list was last updated in 09/2021.

| | Mall | City | Opened in | Total area | Shops | Remarks | References |
|---|---|---|---|---|---|---|---|
| 1 | Akropolis | Vilnius | 2002 | 109,775 m^{2} (1,181,610 sq ft) | 240+ | The largest shopping mall in the Lithuania (Akropole Alfa in Riga has 154000 m2 area) by floor area. | |
| 2 | PLC Mega | Kaunas | 2005 | 102,000 m^{2} (1,100,000 sq ft) | 210+ | It was renovated and expanded in 2016 | |
| 3 | URMAS | Kaunas | 1992 | 90,000 m^{2} (970,000 sq ft) | 2000+ | Many individual sellers. More of a traditional marketplace than shopping mall. Renovated in 2016. | |
| 4 | Akropolis | Kaunas | 2007 | 81,000 m^{2} (870,000 sq ft) | 280+ | Initially planned in the suburb of Biršuliškės, but built in the city center. Owned by Deka Immobilien GmbH. Renovated in 2019. | |
| 5 | Gariūnai Market | Vilnius | 2010 (expanded) | 80,000 m^{2} (860,000 sq ft) | 2000+ | Many individual sellers. More of a traditional marketplace than shopping mall. | |
| 6 | Akropolis | Klaipėda | 2005 | 76,410 m^{2} (822,500 sq ft) | 240+ | | |
| 7 | Akropolis Vingis | Vilnius | 2027 (expected) | 70,000 m^{2} (750,000 sq ft) | | Under construction south of Vingis Park | |
| 8 | Panorama | Vilnius | 2008 | 65,000 m^{2} (700,000 sq ft) | 160+ | Owned by E.L.L. Real Estate | |
| 9 | PC Ozas | Vilnius | 2009 | 62,000 m^{2} (670,000 sq ft) | 170+ | | |
| 10 | Vilnius OUTLET | Vilnius | 2021 | 62,000 m^{2} (670,000 sq ft) | 150+ | Will specialize in outlet stores. | |
| 11 | Bruklinas | Šiauliai | 2007 | 56,000 m^{2} (600,000 sq ft) | 130+ | | |
| 12 | Akropolis | Šiauliai | 2009 | 49,000 m^{2} (530,000 sq ft) | 150+ | | |
| 13 | Ogmios miestas | Vilnius | 2010 (rebuilt) | 43,000 m^{2} (460,000 sq ft) | 100+ | Originally launched in 1993. Also comprises logistics and office buildings | |
| 14 | Big1 & Big2 | Klaipėda | 2004 & 2008 | 40,000 m^{2} (430,000 sq ft) | 140+ | | |
| 15 | Nordika | Vilnius | 2015 | 38,000 m^{2} (410,000 sq ft) | 50+ | Located next to IKEA Vilnius. Owned by Estonian Nantucket Holdings OU | |
| 16 | PC Mada | Vilnius | 2003 | 34,000 m^{2} (370,000 sq ft) | 100+ | | |
| 17 | Banginis | Klaipėda | 2008 | 30,000 m^{2} (320,000 sq ft) | 30+ | | |
| 18 | PC RYO | Panevėžys | 2005 | 28,000 m^{2} (300,000 sq ft) | 140+ | Owned by Pontos Group. Formerly known as "Babilonas" | |
| 19 | Banginis | Vilnius | 2004 | 28,000 m^{2} (300,000 sq ft) | 10+ | | |
| 20 | BIG Vilnius | Vilnius | 2006 | 28,000 m^{2} (300,000 sq ft) | 70+ | | |
| 21 | CUP | Vilnius | 1974 | 27,000 m^{2} (290,000 sq ft) | 150+ | Located in Vilnius CBD. Renovated in 2013, new expansion planned in 2025. | |
| 22 | Saulės miestas | Šiauliai | 2007 | 25,000 m^{2} (270,000 sq ft) | 100+ | | |
| 23 | PC Europa | Vilnius | 2004 | 22,000 m^{2} (240,000 sq ft) | 70+ | Located in Vilnius CBD | |
| 24 | PC Molas | Kaunas | 2003 | 22,000 m^{2} (240,000 sq ft) | 50+ | Owned by Westerwijk investments. | |
| 25 | Hyper Maxima | Kaunas | 2003 | 22,000 m^{2} (240,000 sq ft) | 30+ | Renovated in 2014 | |
| 26 | Outlet Park | Vilnius | 2010 (exp. in 2016) | 15,000 m^{2} (160,000 sq ft) | 90+ | Part of Ogmijos prekybos miestelis. Outlet Park specialises in clothing. | |
| 27 | PC Grandus | Klaipėda | 2005 | 14,000 m^{2} (150,000 sq ft) | 20+ | | |
| 28 | Savas | Kaunas | 2004 | 13,000 m^{2} (140,000 sq ft) | 50+ | | |
| 29 | G9 | Vilnius | 2007 | 12,000 m^{2} (130,000 sq ft) | 50+ | Previously known as Gedimino 9 and GO9. Located on Gediminas Avenue in a building formerly occupied by Vilnius City Municipality. The first owner declared bankruptcy in 2010. The mall was renovated in 2013 and 2019. | |
| 30 | Domus Pro | Vilnius | 2014 | 12,000 m^{2} (130,000 sq ft) | 20+ | | |
| 31 | Eifelis | Ukmergė | 2007 | 12,000 m^{2} (130,000 sq ft) | 30+ | | |
| 32 | River Mall | Kaunas | 2017 | 11,000 m^{2} (120,000 sq ft) | 20 | | |
| 33 | Studlendas | Klaipėda | 2007 | 10,799 m^{2} (116,240 sq ft) | 50+ | | |
| 34 | Mandarinas | Vilnius | 2005 | 10,000 m^{2} (110,000 sq ft) | 40+ | Owned by Citycon Oyj | |

== Gallery ==
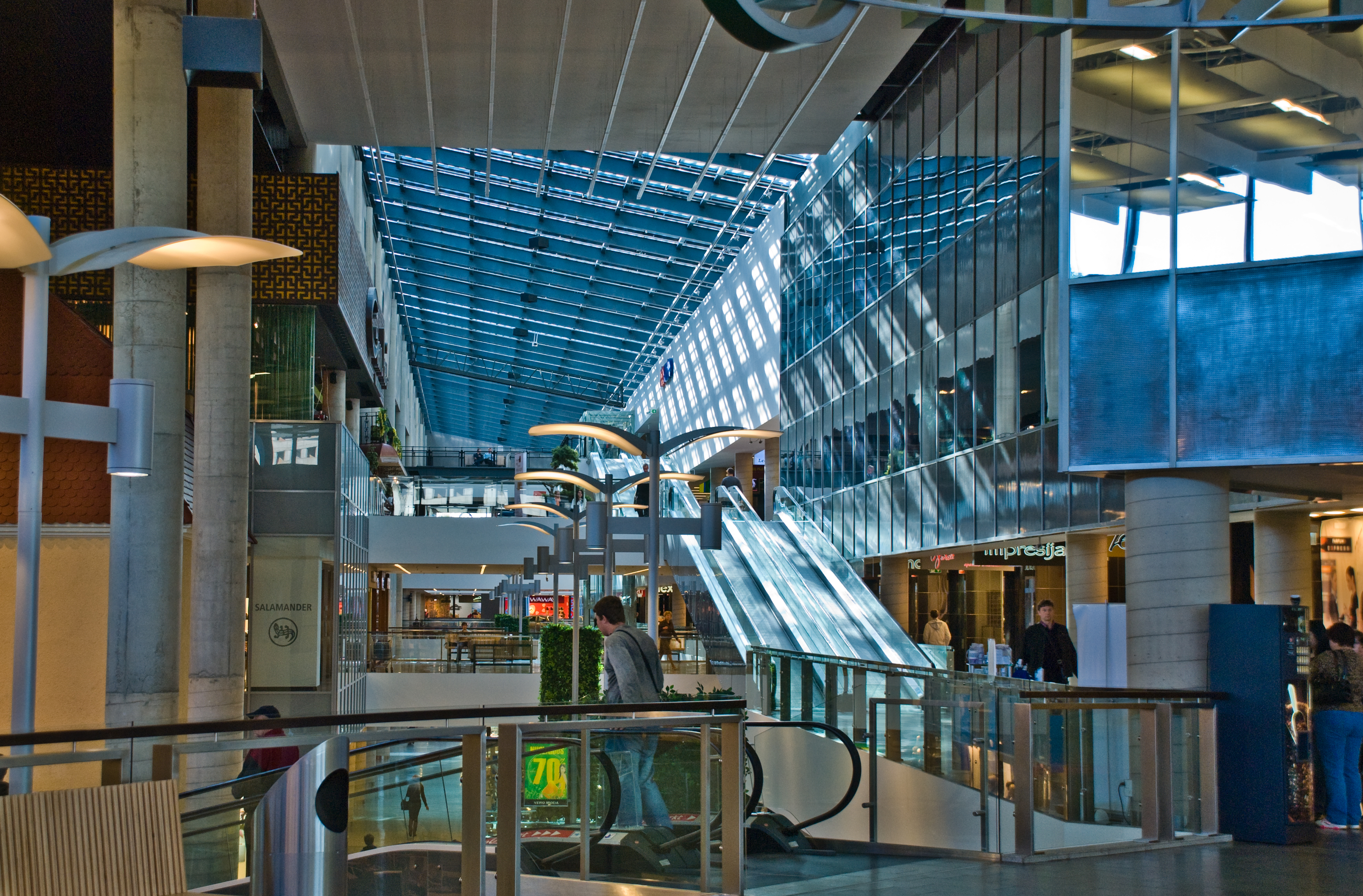
Interior of Akropolis Kaunas

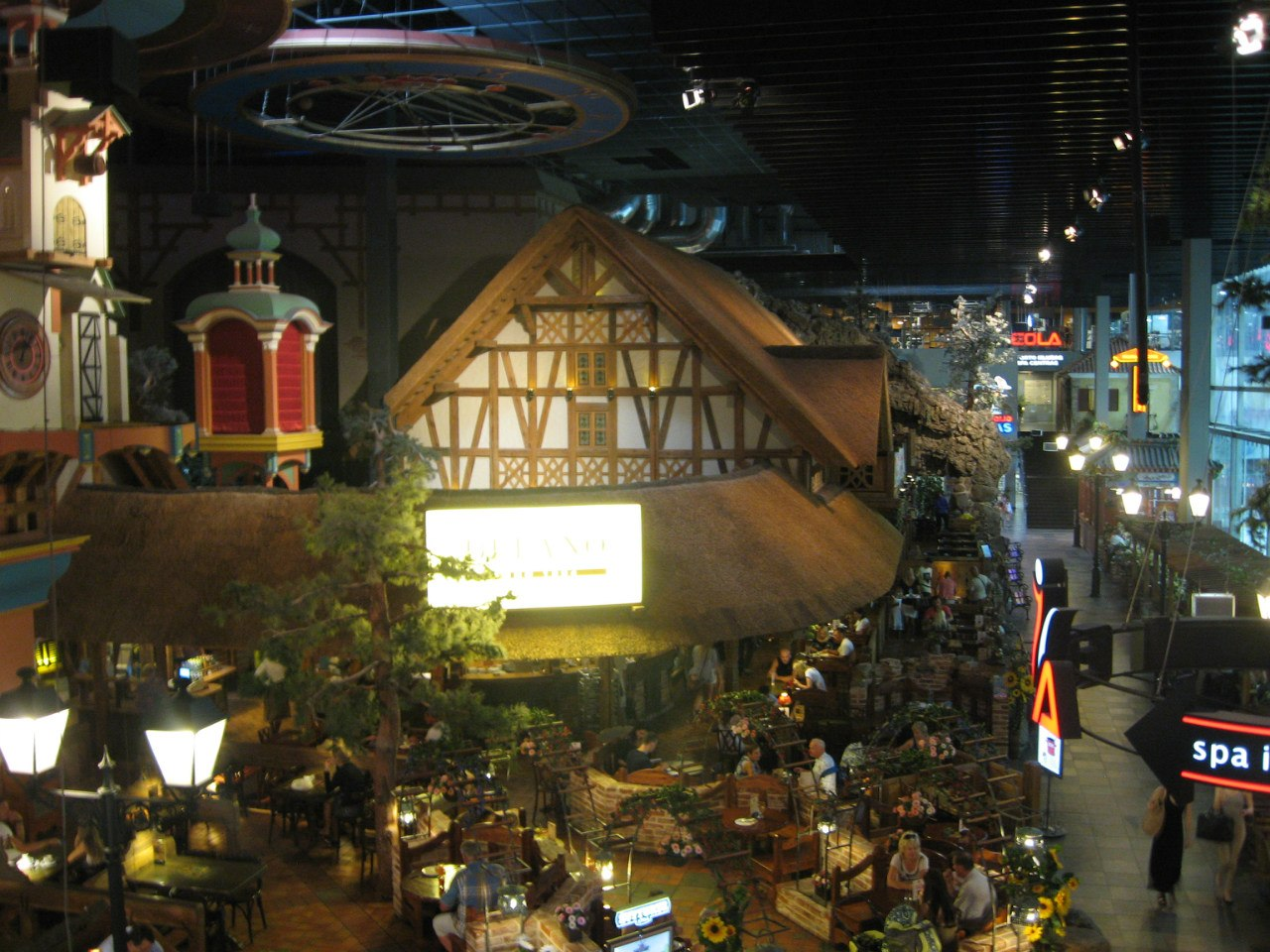
Interior of Akropolis Klaipėda

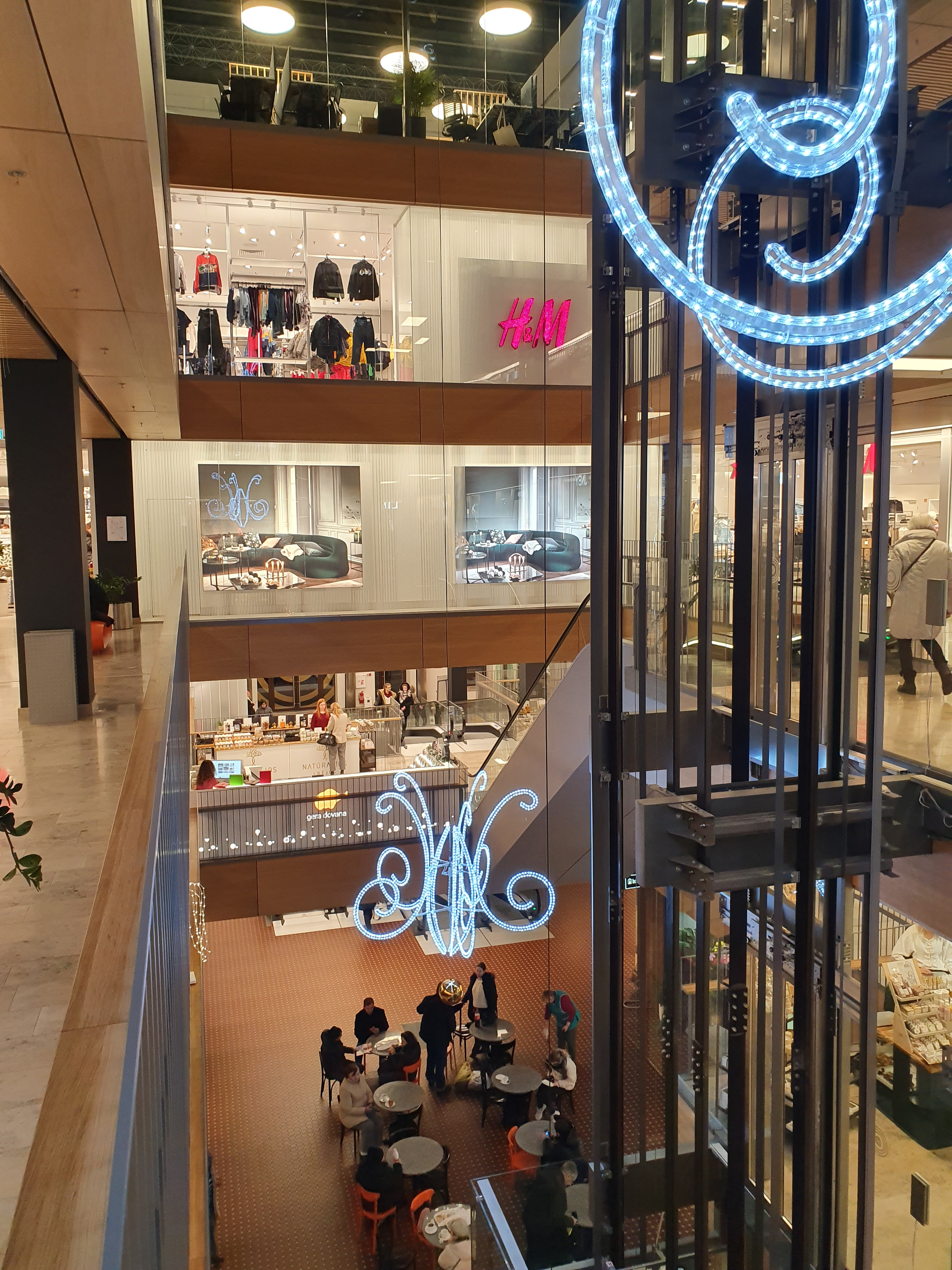
Interior of GO9 in Vilnius, decorated for Christmas

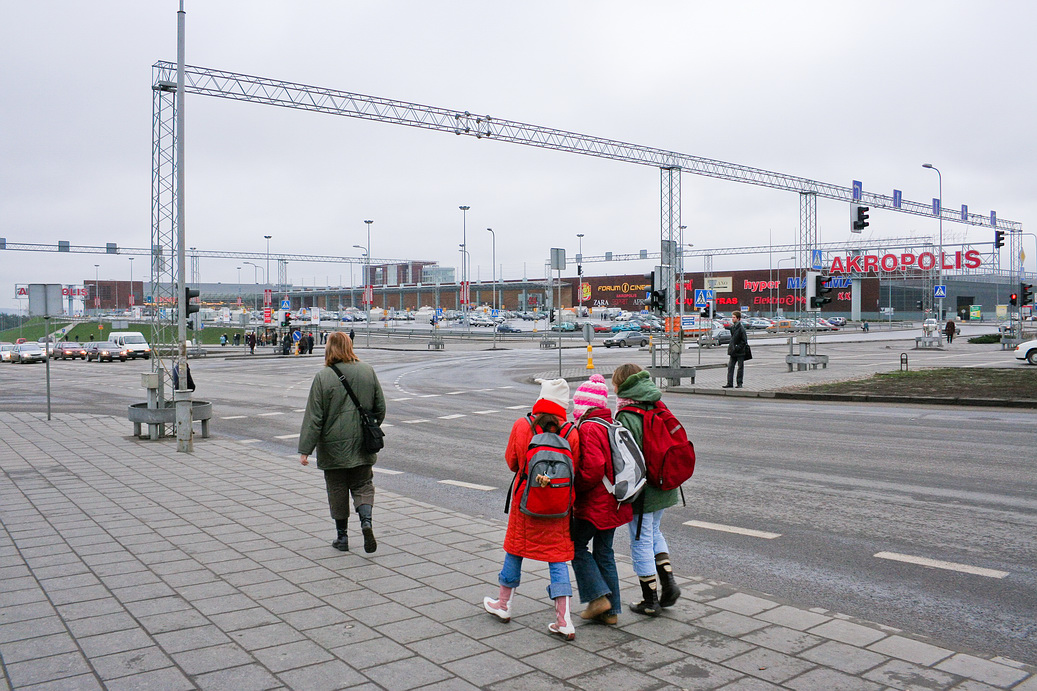
Exterior of Akropolis Vilnius

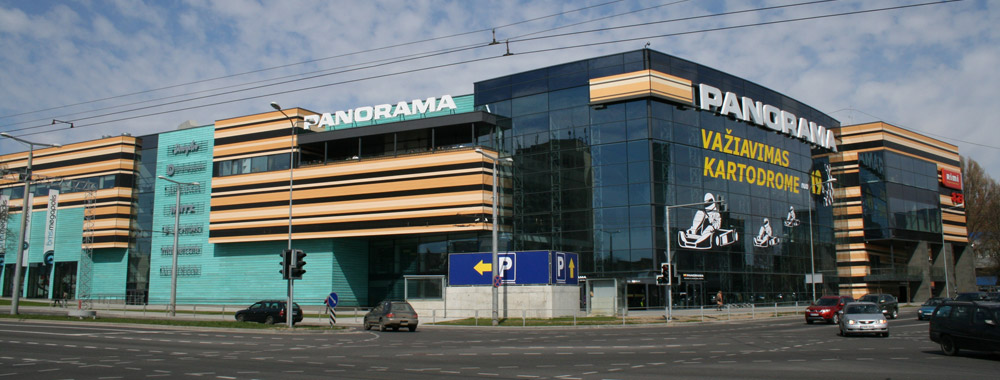
Exterior of PLC Panorama

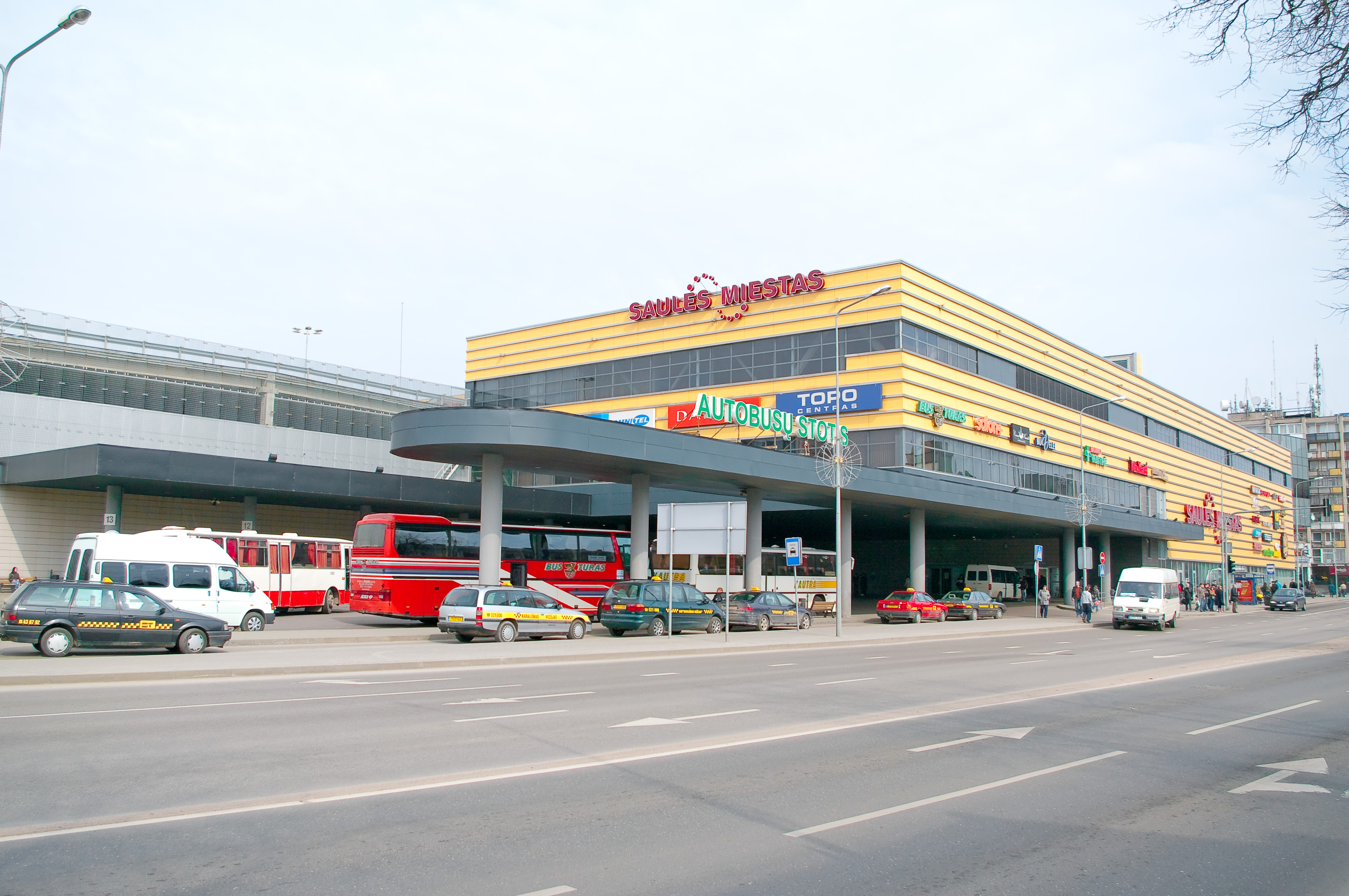
Exterior of Saulės Miestas

CUP, the oldest shopping mall

== See also ==
- List of largest shopping malls
- Lists of shopping malls
