= PLC Panorama =

Shopping centre in Vilnius, Lithuania

Coordinates: 54°42′00″N 25°15′27″E

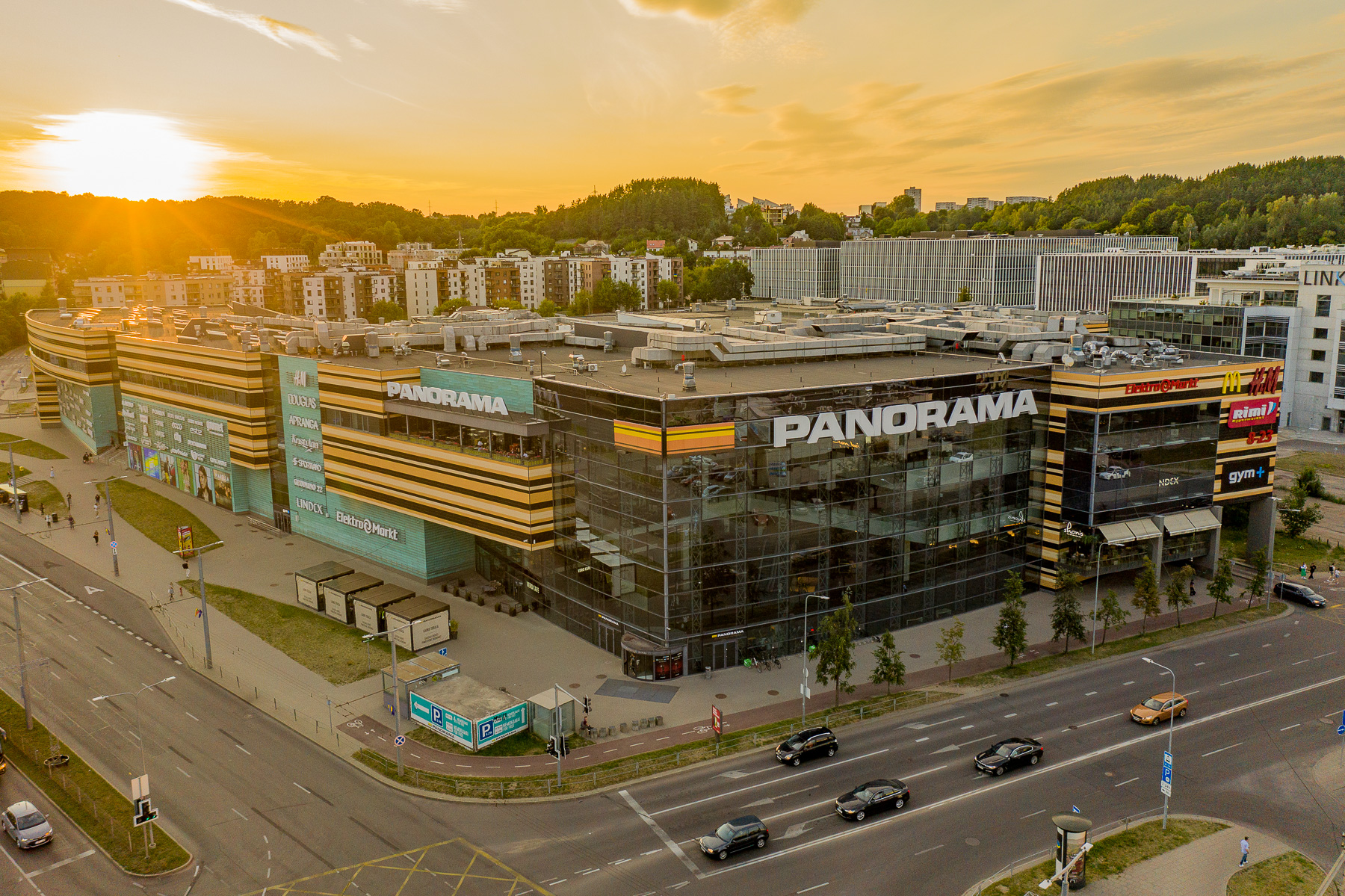
2023

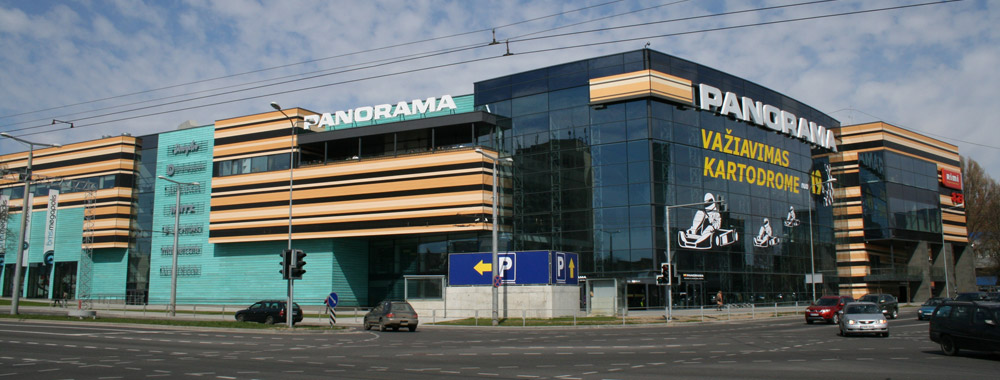
2009

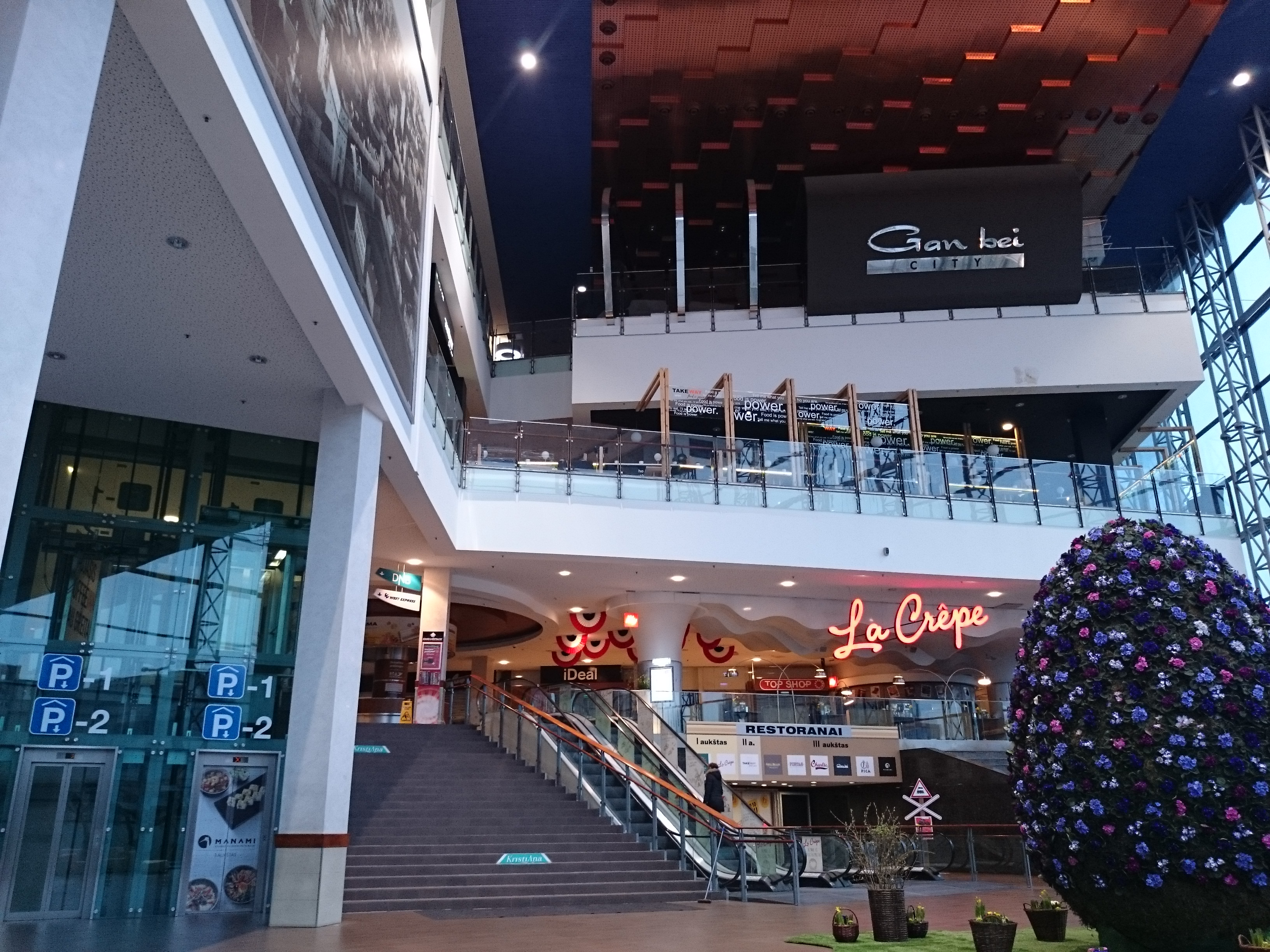
Entry

Panorama is the third largest shopping center in Vilnius and the seventh largest shopping mall in Lithuania with 65,000 m2 (700,000 sq ft). It is owned by UAB E.L.L. „Nekilnojamas Turtas“ (Group E.L.L. Real Estate). It was built by the Lithuanian company in 2008, in Saltoniškės. There are 180 dealer locations, 18 cafes and restaurants, 1600 free parking spaces in the underground car park, 30 escalators and lifts.

== See also ==
- List of shopping malls in Lithuania
