= Gariūnai Market =

Market in Vilnius, Lithuania

Coordinates: 54.659468°N 25.155809°E

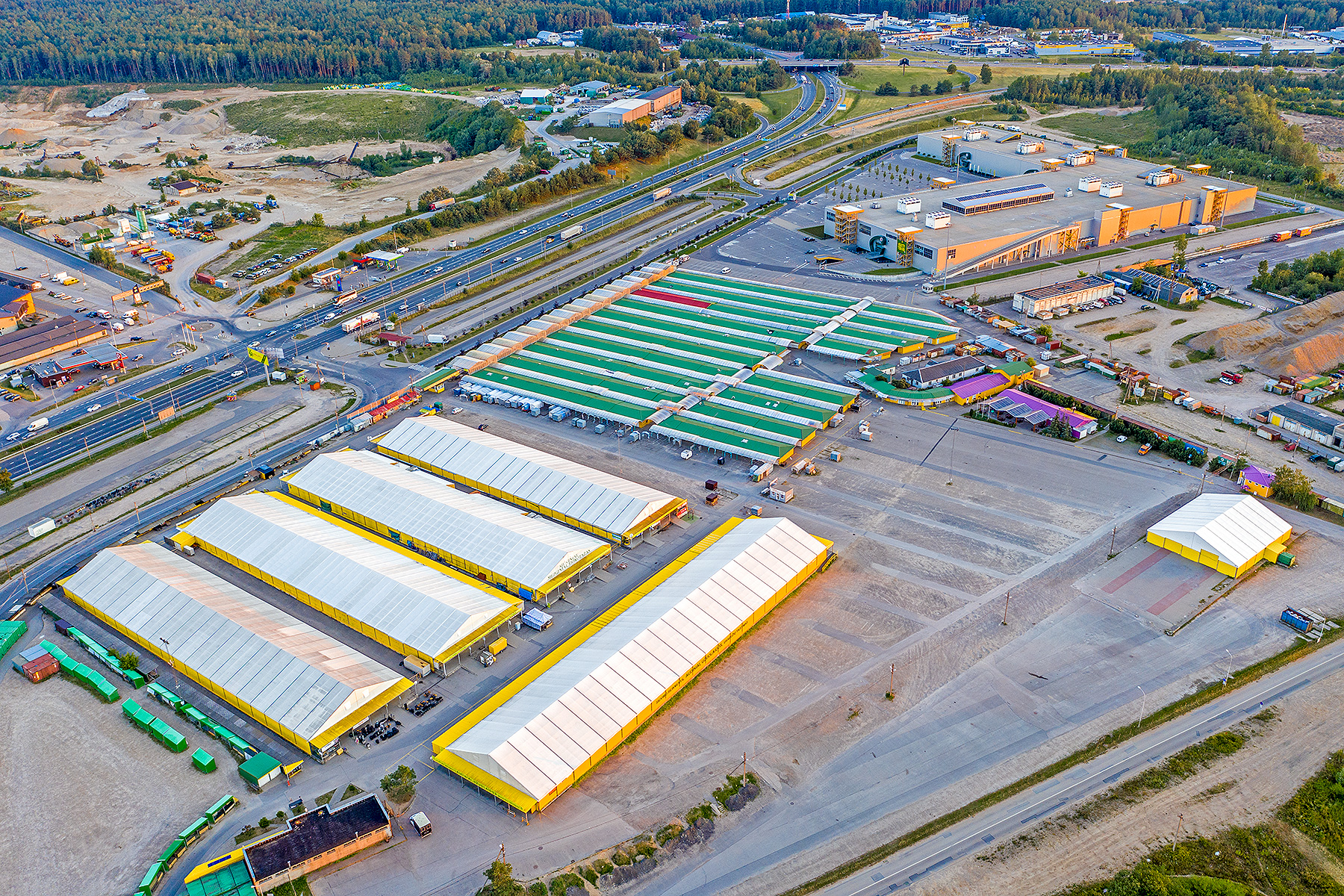

Gariūnai Market (Lithuanian: Gariūnų turgus) is the biggest market in Lithuania, located in Gariūnai microdistrict (Lithuanian: miesto dalis) of Vilnius, the capital of Lithuania.

There are about 10,000 sellers working.

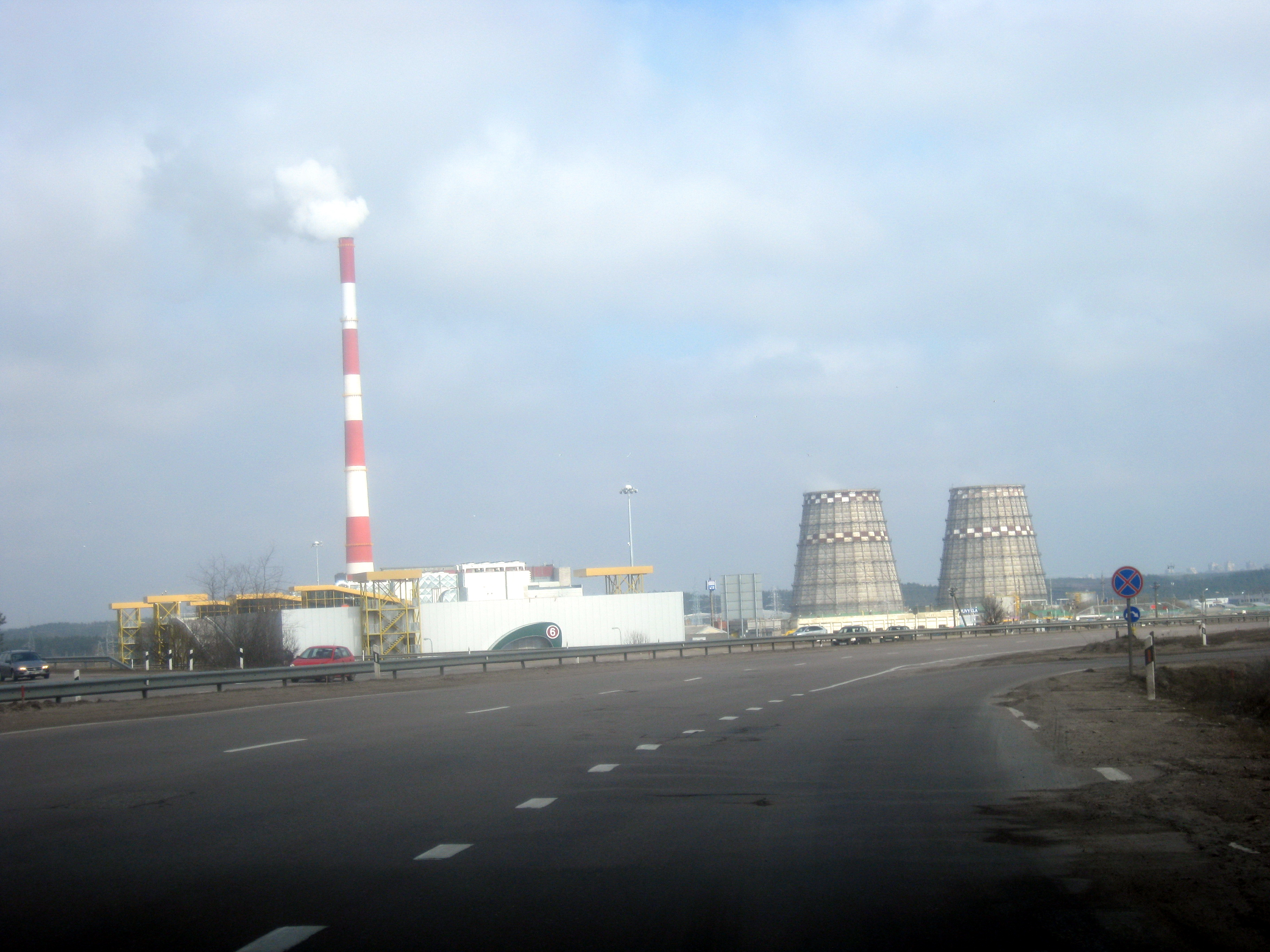
Gariūnai market and 3rd Vilnius power plant

In the end of 2010, an expansion for the market was built.

== See also ==
- List of shopping malls in Lithuania
