= PLC Mega =

Coordinates: 54°56′19″N 23°53′40″E

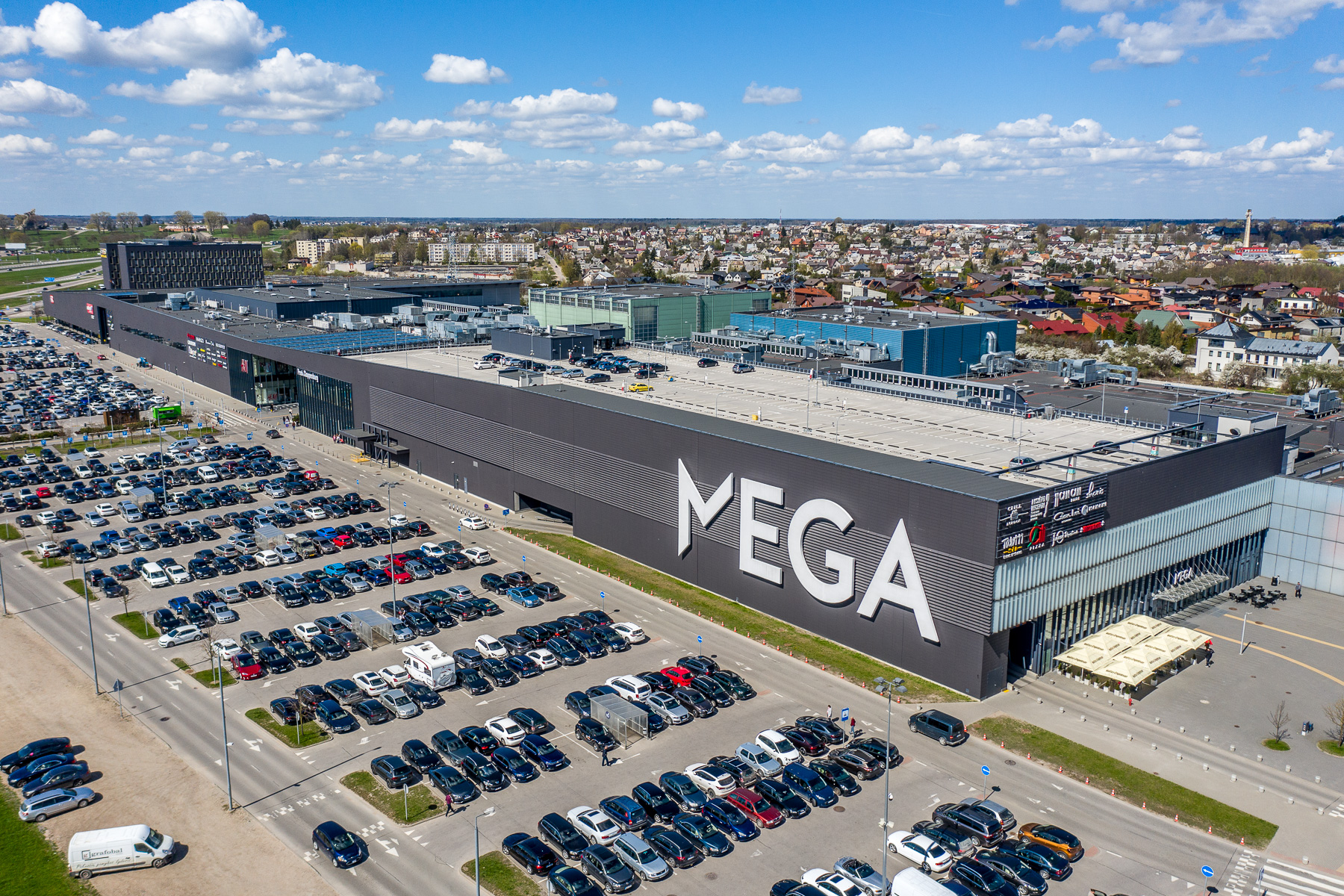
MEGA

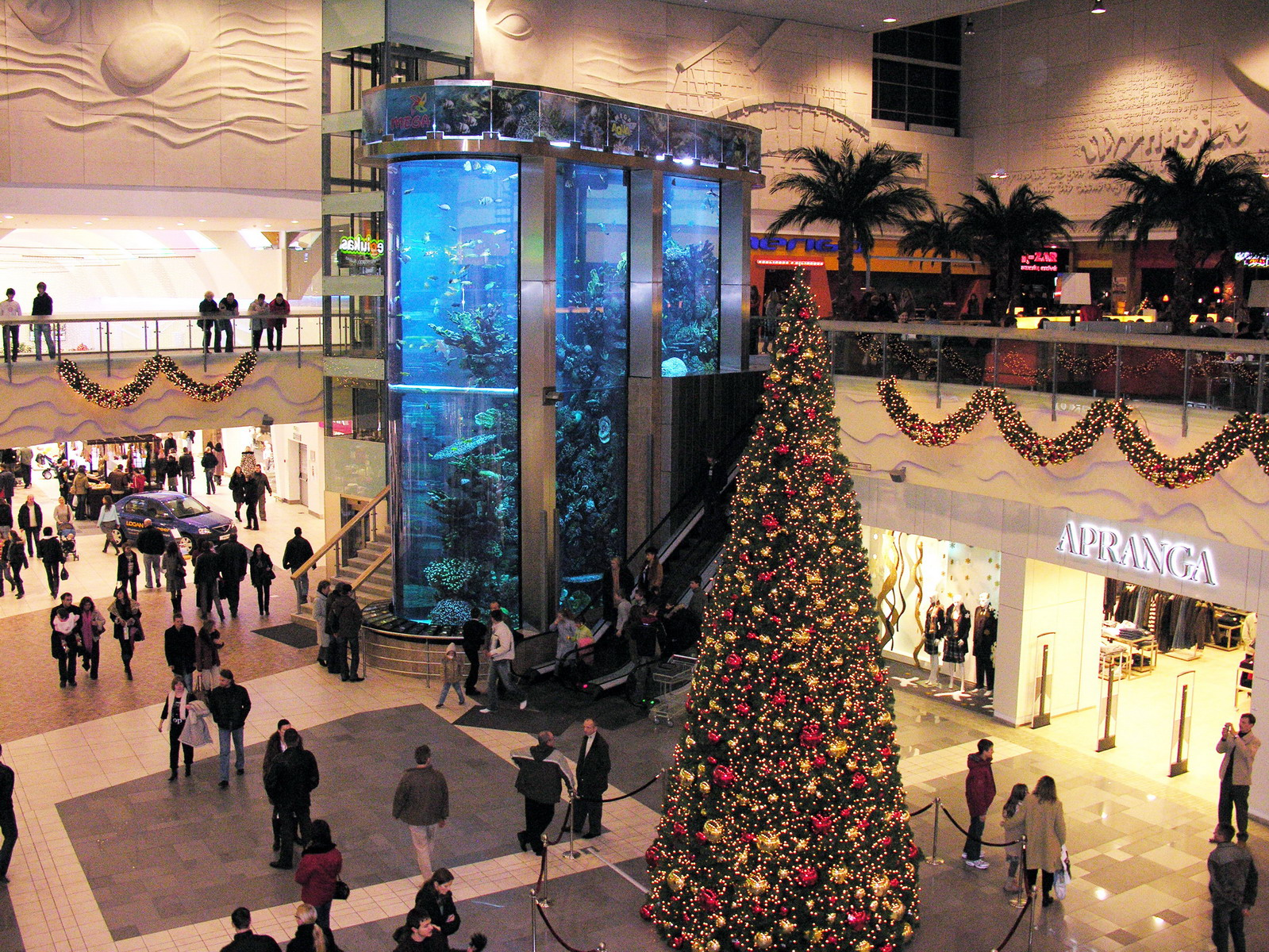
PLC MEGA

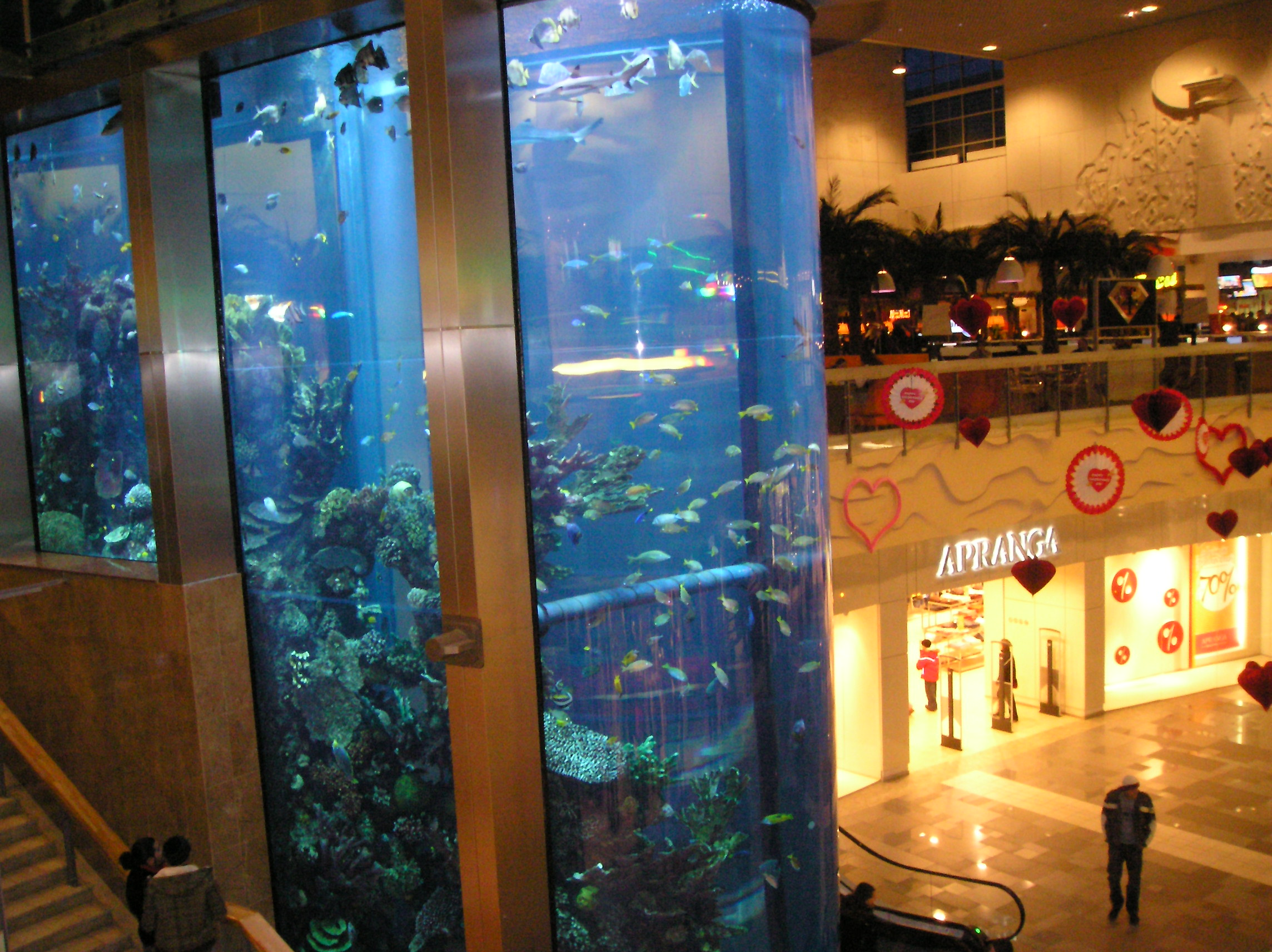

PLC Mega is the second largest shopping mall in the Baltics 102,000 m2 (1,100,000 sq ft). Mega is in Kaunas, Lithuania. It was built by the Lithuanian company AB "Baltic Shopping Centers" in 2005. The building has a marine aquarium. It is the highest aquarium in the Baltic States. The aquarium has a volume of 170,000 litres (45,000 US gal) and you'll find tropical fish of 30 different species from the Atlantic, Indian and Pacific Oceans, the Red Sea and Mediterranean and the Caribbean. The mall was renovated in 2016, with expansion.

== See also ==
- List of shopping malls in Lithuania
