= Akropolis (Vilnius) =

Shopping mall

Coordinates: 54.7105587°N 25.259478°E

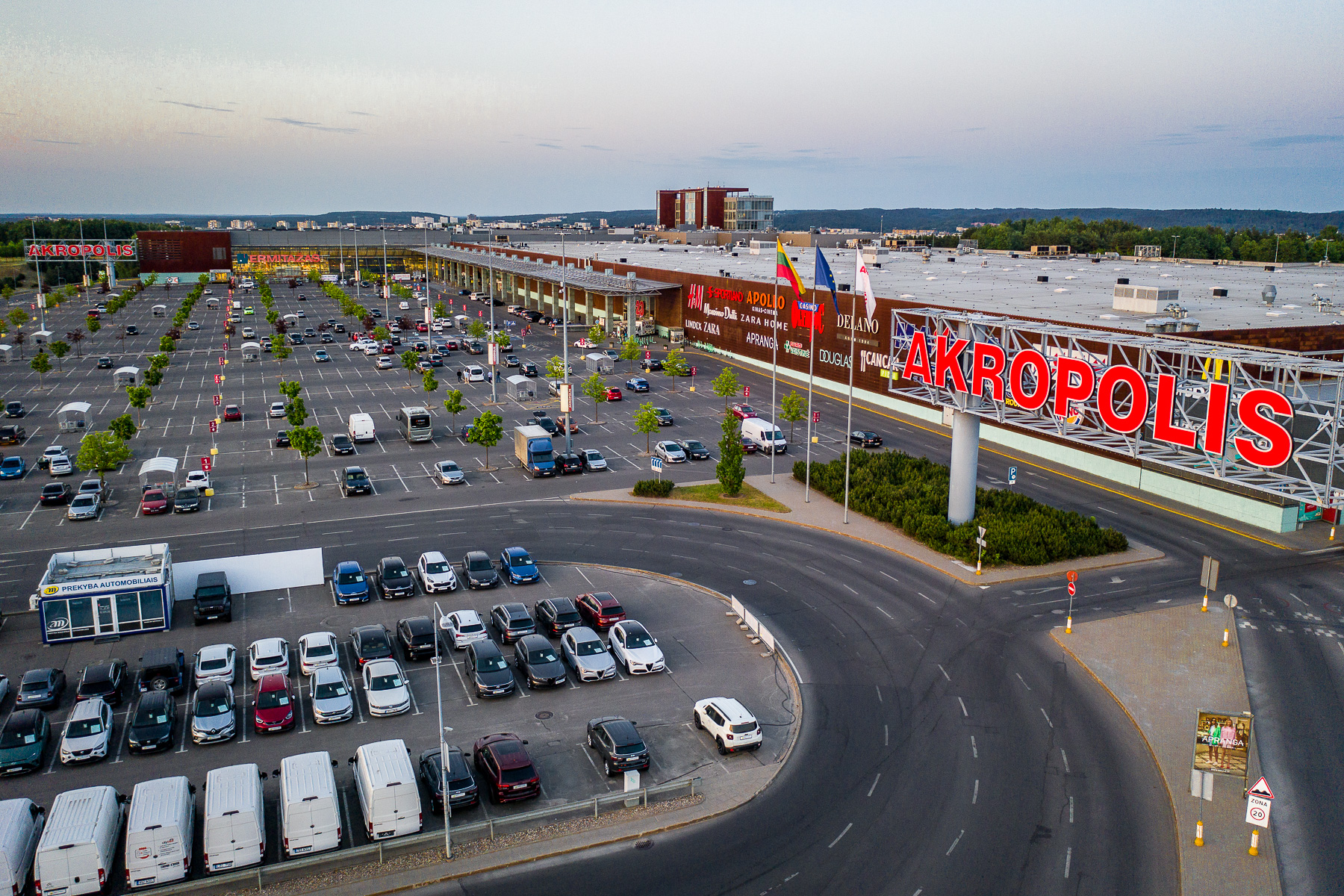
2023

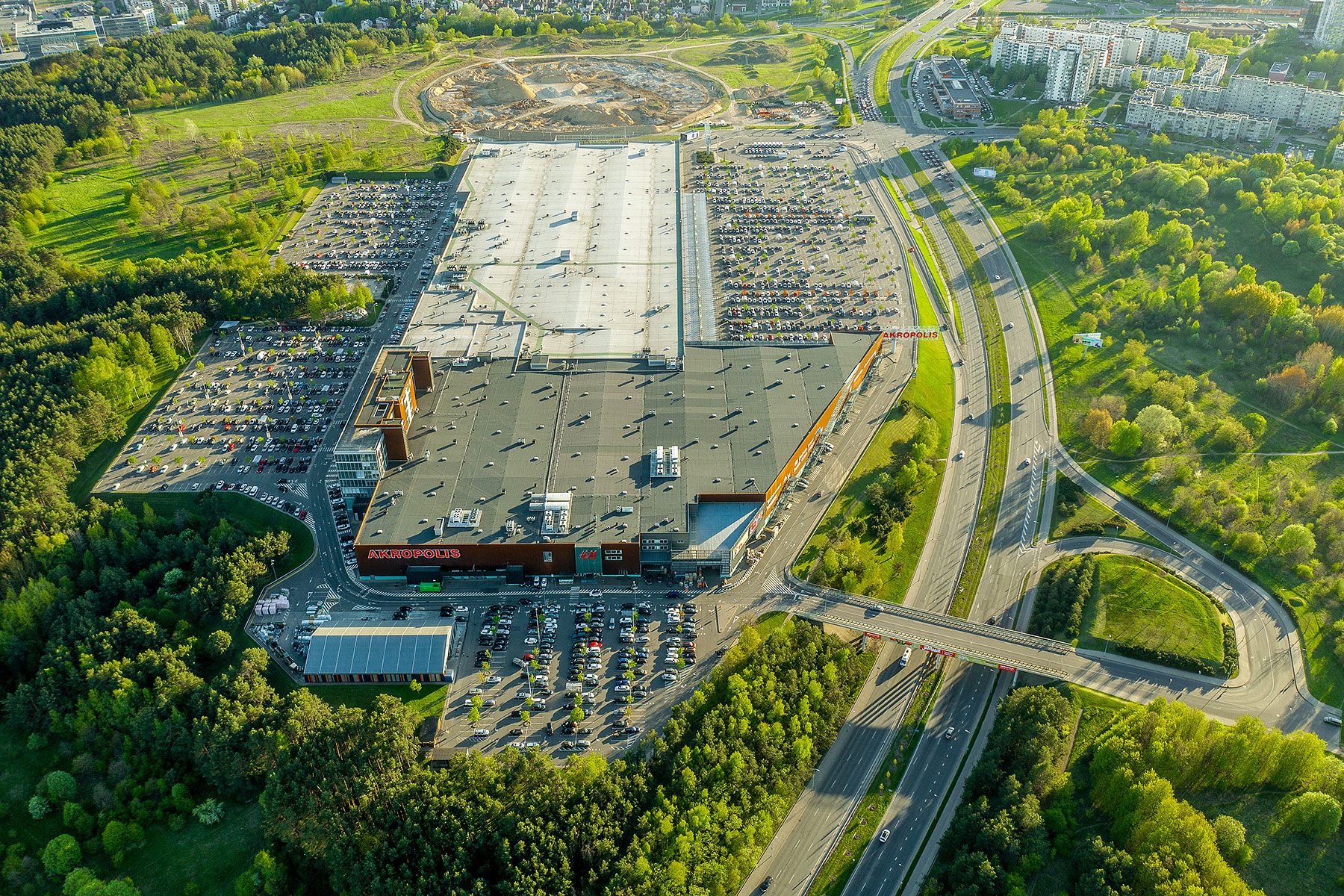
2022

Akropolis is the largest shopping mall in the Baltics by floor area, a shopping center and entertainment center in Vilnius, the Lithuanian capital. It was built in Šeškinė by Akropolis Group in 2002 and opened in April 2002 (at that time the area was 54,000 square meters). The bank "Hansa-LTB" financed the construction. The authors of the project "Akropolis" were architects Gediminas Jurevičius and Algimantas Nasvytis from Vilnius. Interior project author was designer Unko Kunnap (Estonia).

There is a free car park next to the building. In Akropolis there are grocery stores, Maxima LT supermarket, shops etc. The shopping center also has a bookstore. The area has an area of 110,000 square meters. Not far away is the other shopping center, PC Ozas, built by German companies.

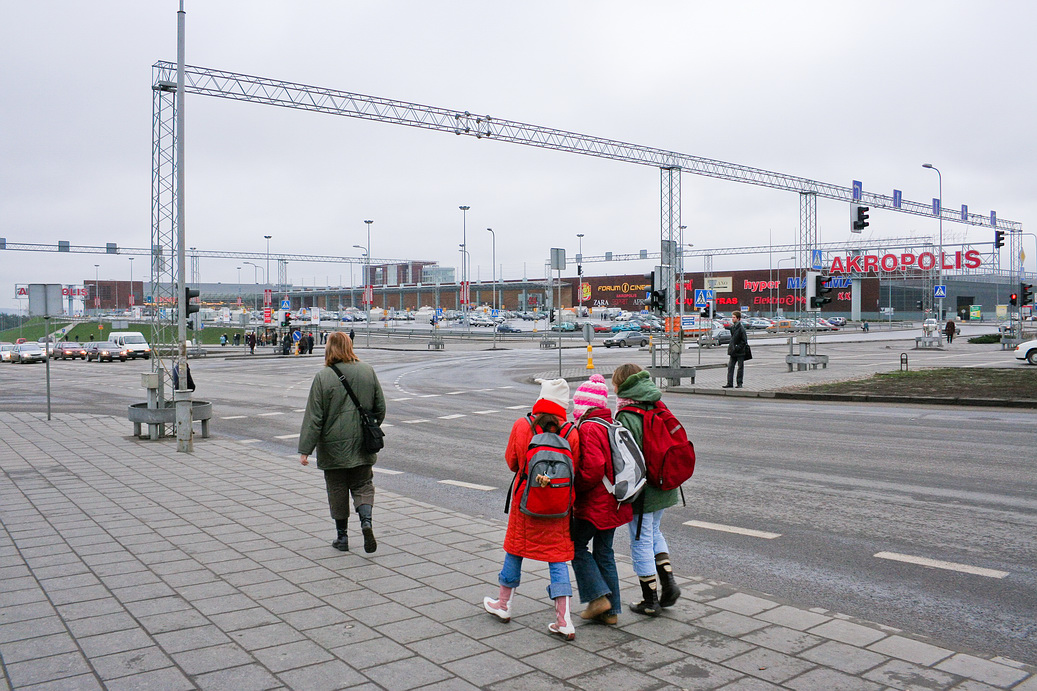
2006

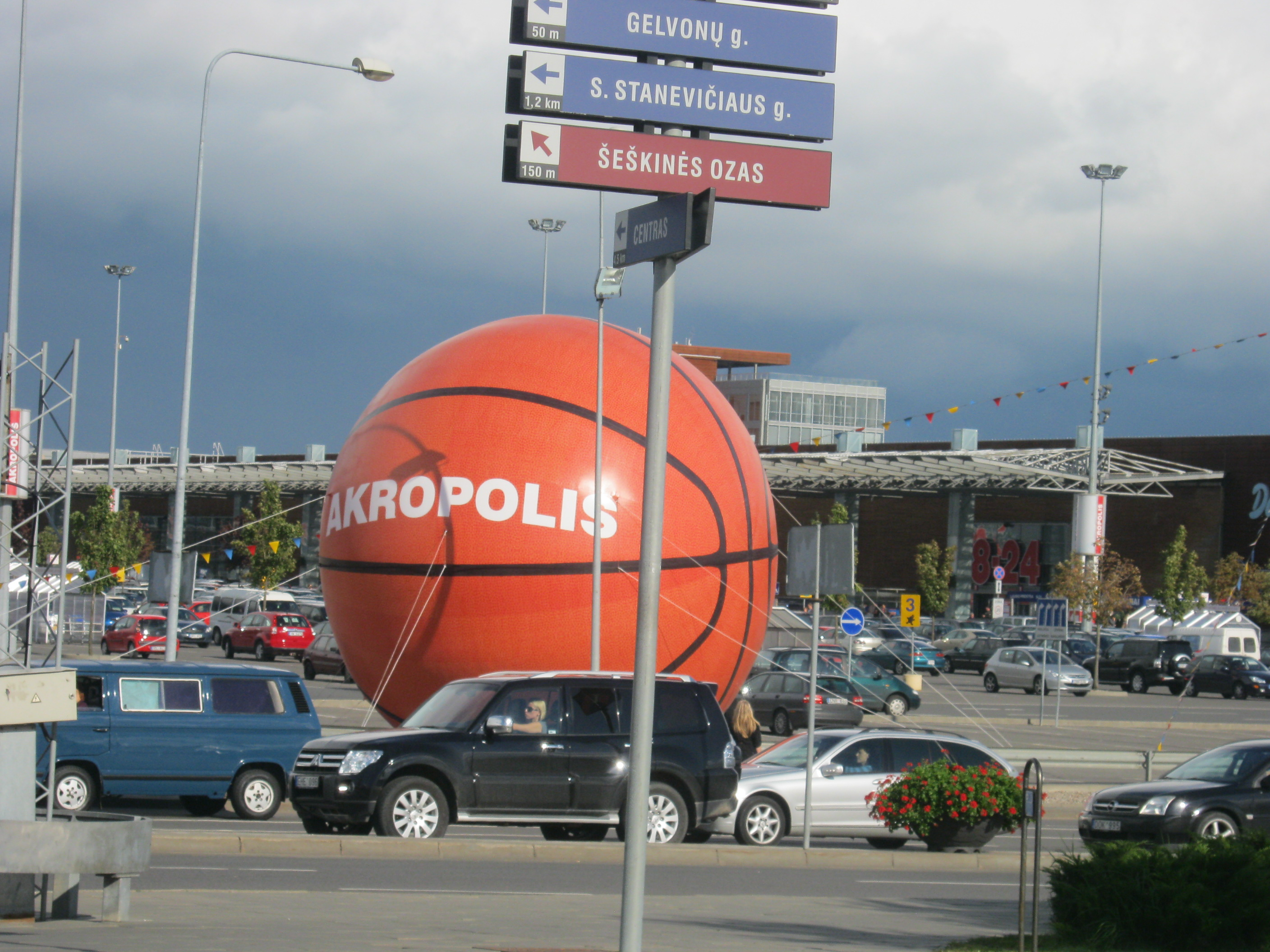
Eurobasket 2011 ball

== See also ==
- List of shopping malls in Lithuania
