= Škoda 32Tr SOR =

Full-sized low-entry trolleybus produced by Škoda Transportation

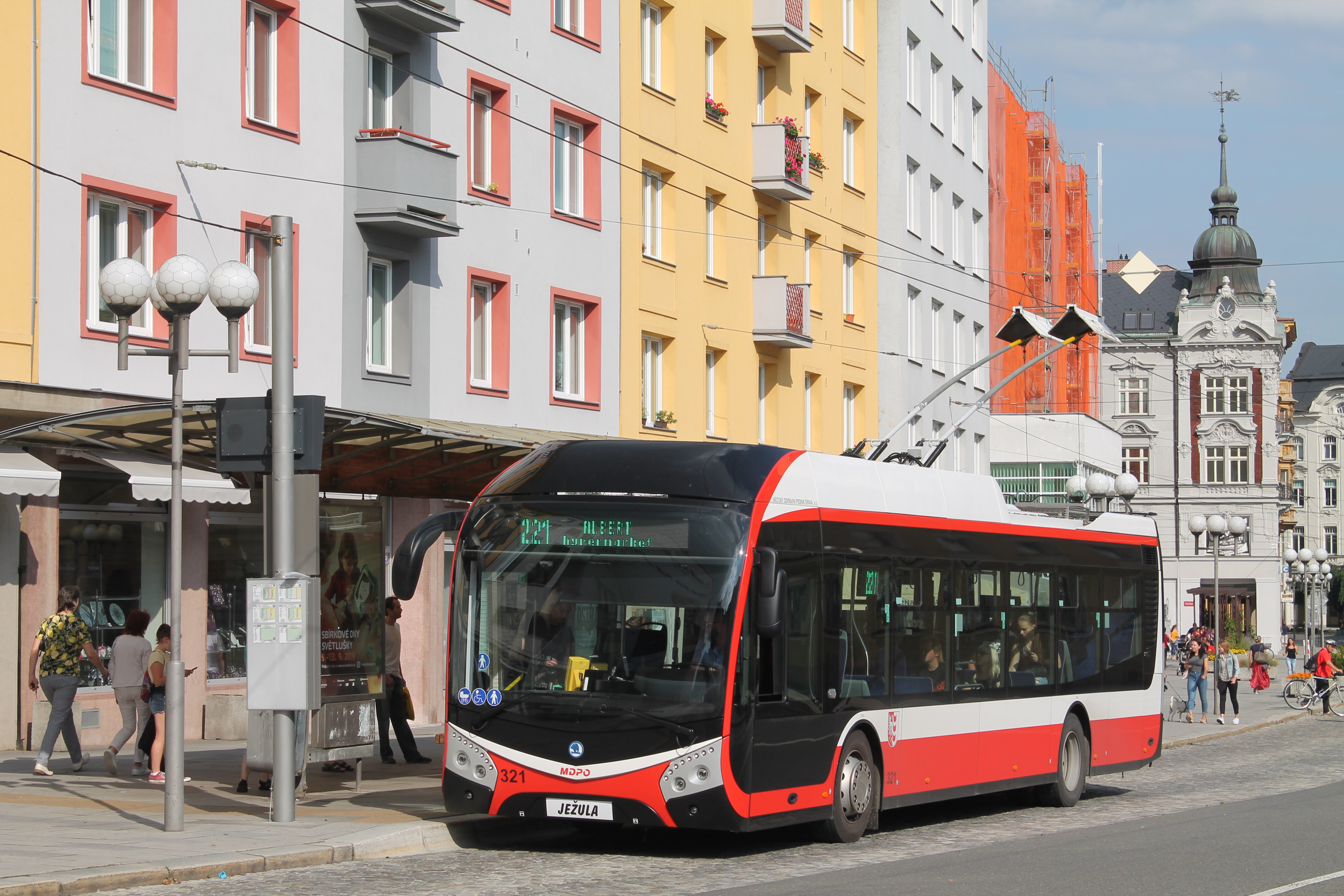
- Škoda 32Tr SOR in Opava

Overview
- Manufacturer: SOR, Škoda Transportation

Body and chassis
- Doors: 2 or 3
- Floor type: Low-floor; Low-entry

Powertrain
- Engine: Škoda 4ML 3444 K/4
- Capacity: 32 sitting 68 standing
- Power output: 1 × 160 kW (210 hp)

Dimensions
- Length: 12,000 mm (39 ft 4 1/2 in)
- Width: 2,550 mm (8 ft 4 3/8 in)
- Height: 3,370 mm (11 ft 5/8 in)
- Curb weight: 10,180 kg (22,440 lb)

The Škoda 32Tr SOR is a full-sized low-entry trolleybus produced in cooperation of Škoda Electric (subsidiary of Škoda Transportation) (electrical equipment and assembly) and SOR, which supplies the body based on the bus SOR NS 12.

== Construction features ==
The Škoda 32Tr is derived from the SOR NS 12 rigid bus. Electric motor is located in the rear of the bus. Plastic Ster seats are used inside. Rear axle is VOITH brand, the front axle is its own production with independent wheel suspension. Only rear axle is driven. Body of the vehicle is welded from steel-voltage profiles, flashings from the outside and interior are lined with plastic sheeting. The floor of the bus is at a height of 340 mm (13 in) above the ground. On the right side of the bus, there are three passenger doors.

== Production and operation ==
Production started in 2018. In Czech cities they replaced old high-floor trolleybuses Škoda 14Tr or old low-floor trolleybuses Škoda 21Tr. Opava became the first to operate these trolleybuses.

Country	City	Year	Amount	Reference
Czech Republic	Brno	2023-2024	20	
Czech Republic	Jihlava	2020	10	
Czech Republic	Opava	2018-2020	15	
Czech Republic	Pardubice	2019-2023	15	
Czech Republic	Teplice	2019-2020	7	
Estonia	Tallinn	2026	18	
Germany	Esslingen am Neckar	2026	10	
Lithuania	Vilnius	2024-2025	91	

== Gallery ==
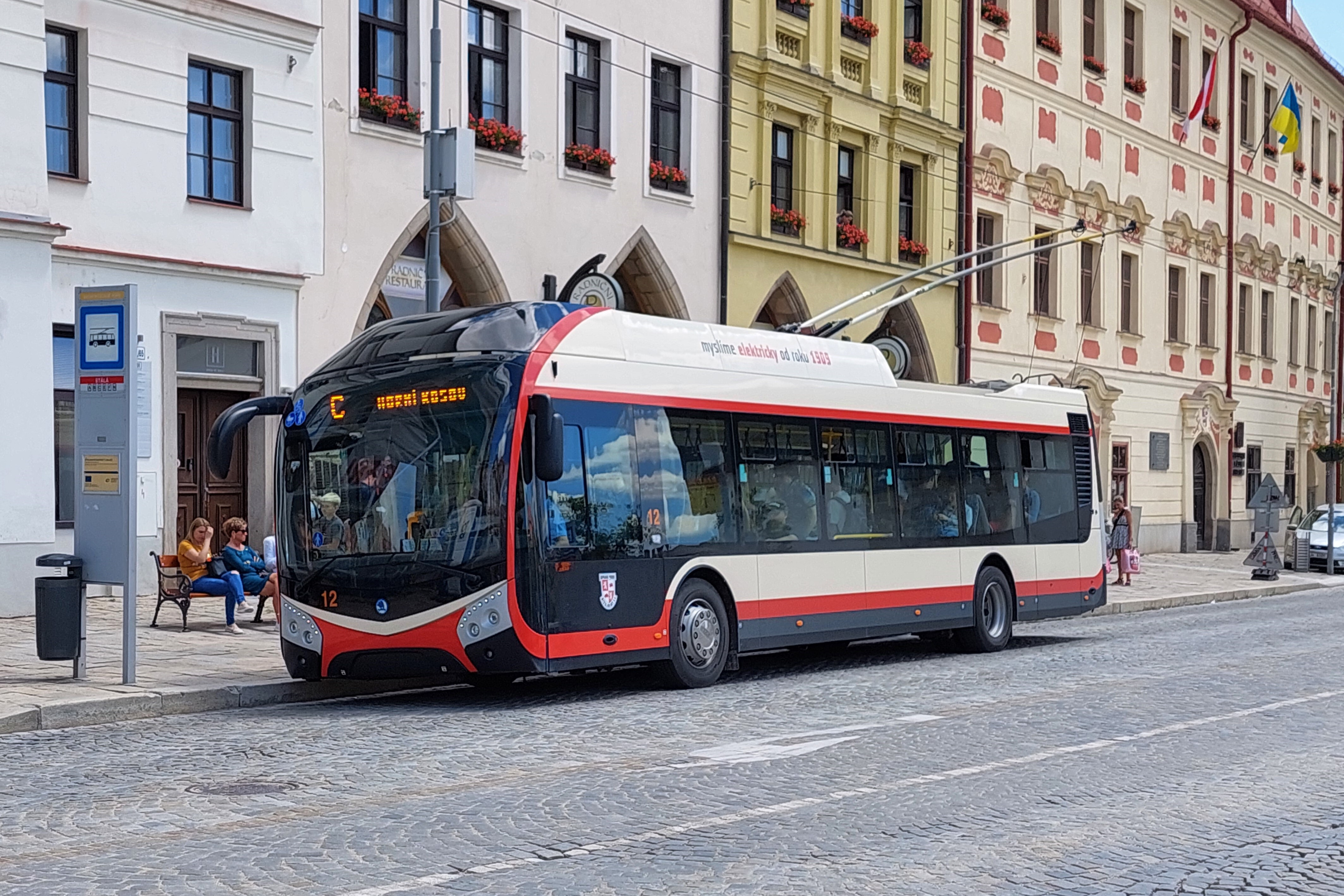
in Jihlava

in Brno

in Pardubice

in Tallinn

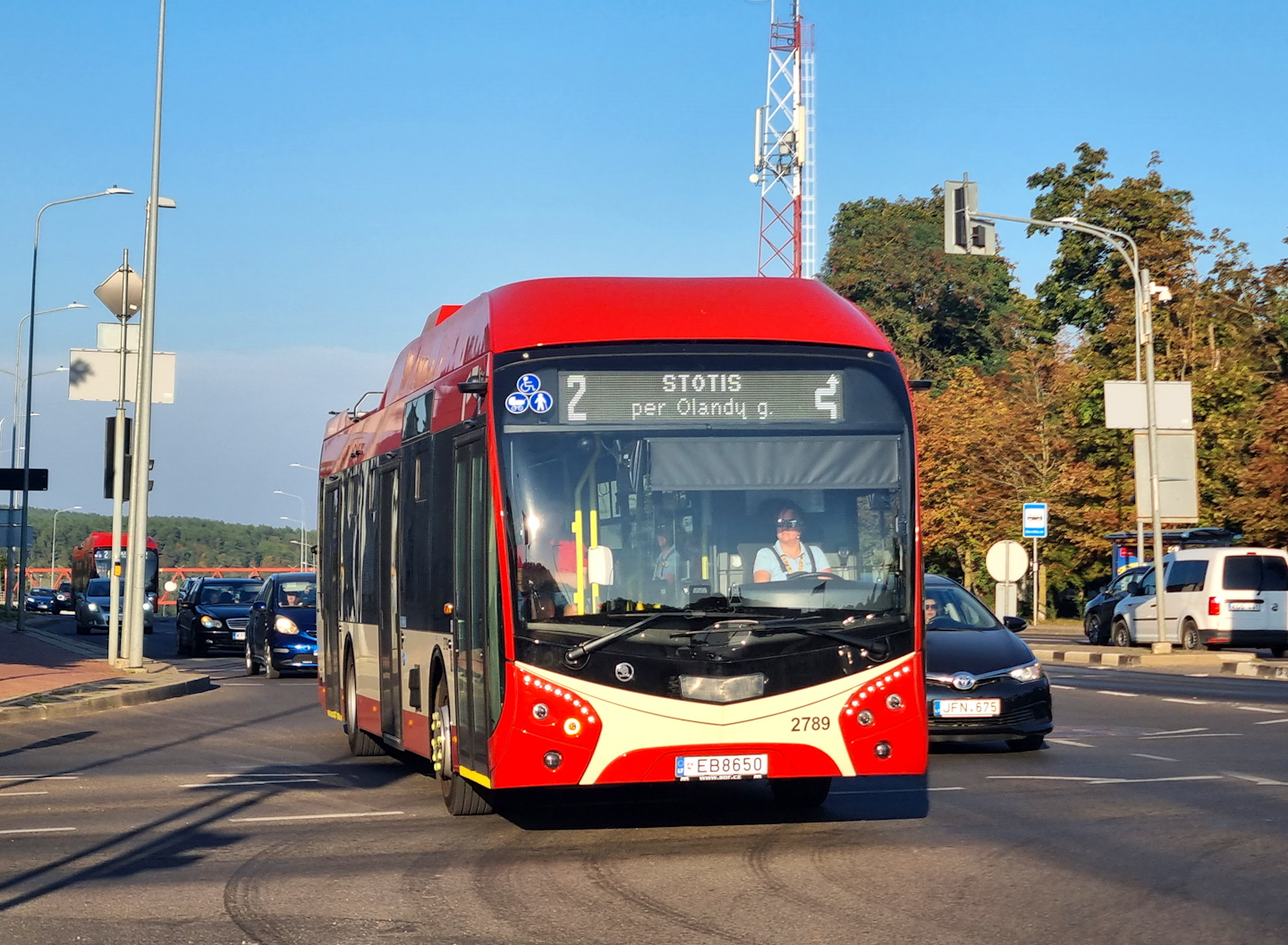
in Vilnius

in Zlín
