= Justiniškės =

- Eldership
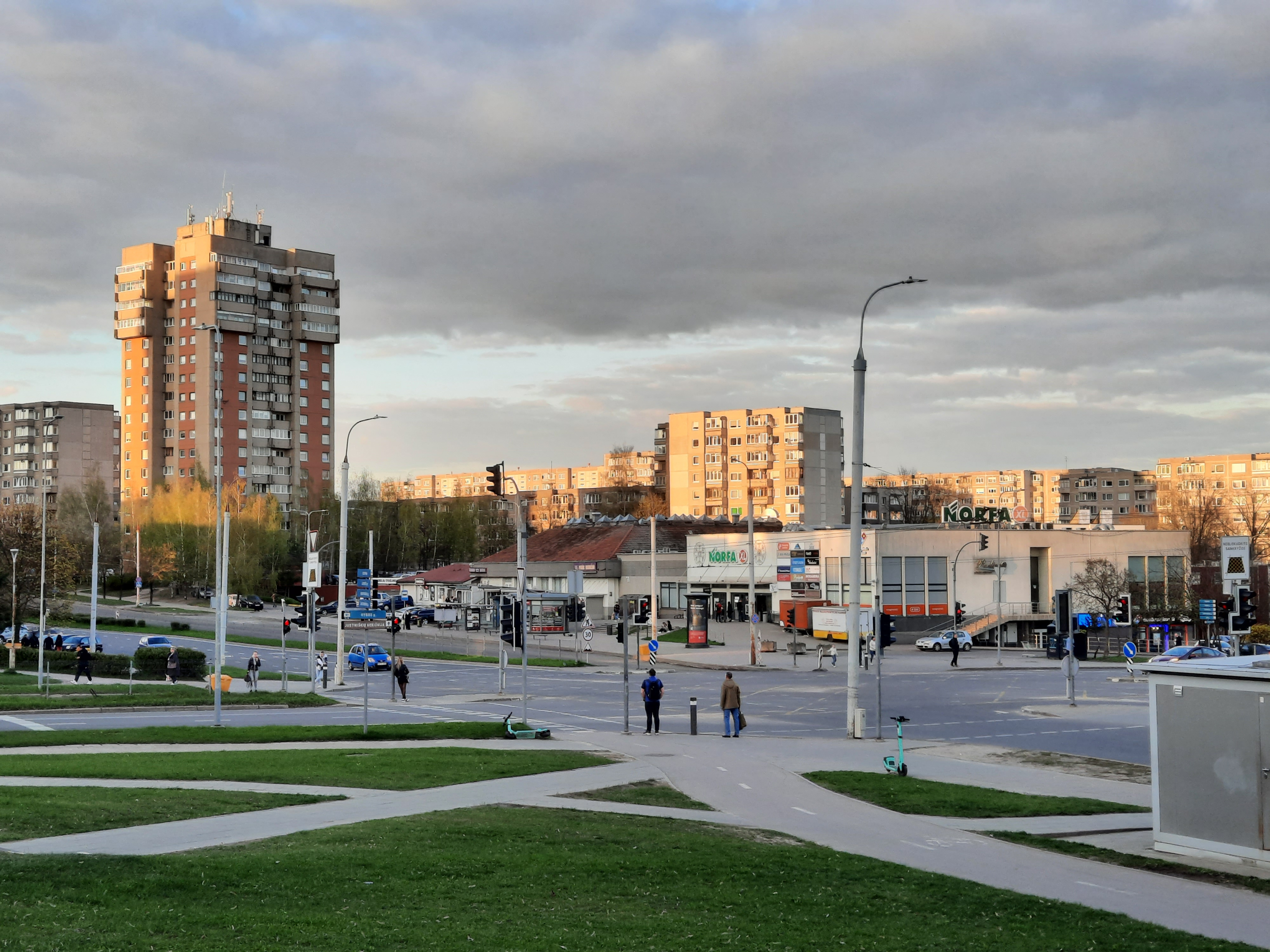
- View of Justiniškės

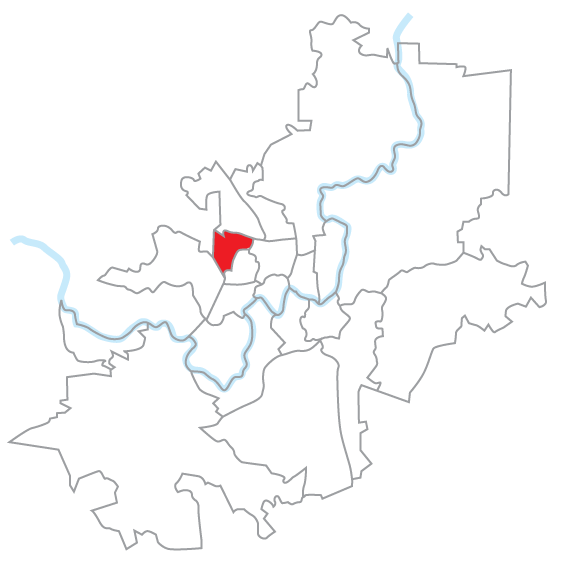

- Location of Justiniškės
- Country: Lithuania
- County: Vilnius County
- Municipality: Vilnius city municipality

Area
  - Total: 3 km^{2} (1.2 sq mi)

Population (2021)
  - Total: 25,956
  - Density: 8,700/km^{2} (22,000/sq mi)
- Time zone: UTC+2 (EET)
  - Summer (DST): UTC+3 (EEST)

Justiniškės, located in western edge of Vilnius, is one of the newest districts in the capital of Lithuania. It is also one of the 21 elderships of Vilnius city municipality. It was built mainly in the 1980s as a microdistrict. Almost all buildings are large Soviet-built residential apartment complexes. According to the Lithuanian census of 2011, it has a population of 27,462.

== Facilities ==
There are about 289 large apartment buildings. The streets in Justiniškės are: Taikos (Peace), Rygos (Riga), Justiniškių, Ežeraičio, Skatulės and Mozūriškių. Justiniškės has stores from major Lithuanian store chains. There are a few schools in the area: Mykolas Biržiška Gymnasium (Mykolo Biržiškos gimnazija), Pelėda primary school (Pelėdos pradinė mokykla, named after owl), Sietuva progymnasium (Sietuvos progimnazija), Taika progymnasium (Taikos progimnazija), Vyturys primary school (Vyturio pradinė mokykla, named after lark) and a few more. There also are some kindergartens: "Nykštukas" (Dwarf), "Žilvinėlis", and "Justinukas". Several banks, including SEB and Swedbank, offer their services to the residents.

The district has a recreation area with a little forest, a park, and a lake.
