= 2014 Lithuanian presidential election =

- 11 May 2014 (first round); 25 May 2014 (second round)
- Turnout: 52.23% (first round); 47.37% (second round)
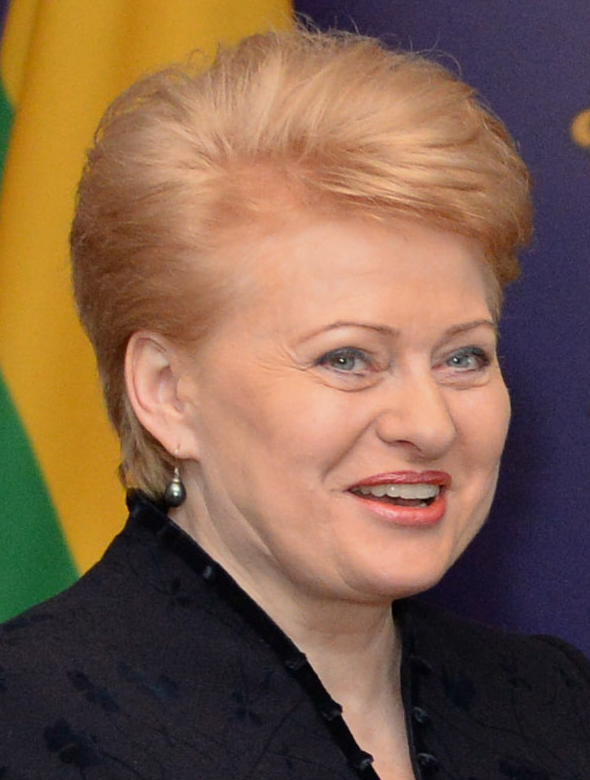

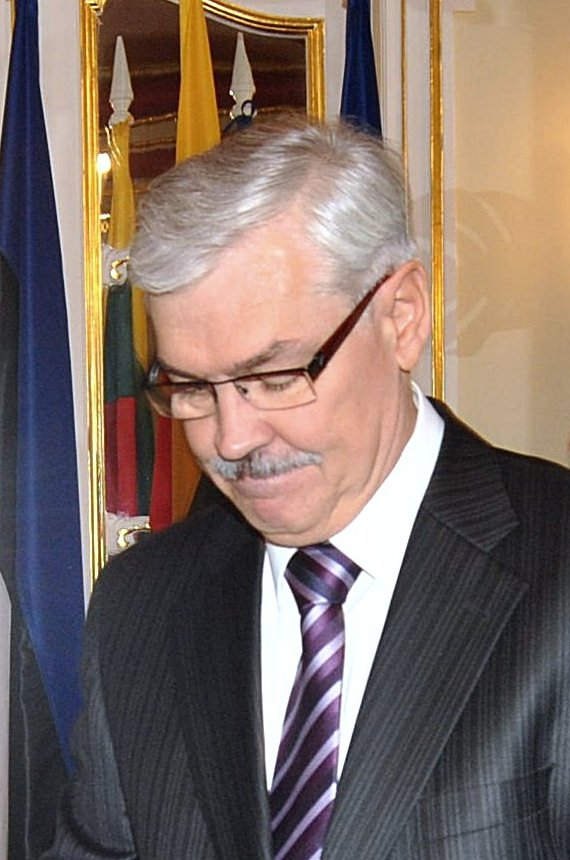
Nominee	Dalia Grybauskaitė	Zigmantas Balčytis
Party	Independent	LSDP
Popular vote	701,999	486,214
Percentage	59.08%	40.92%
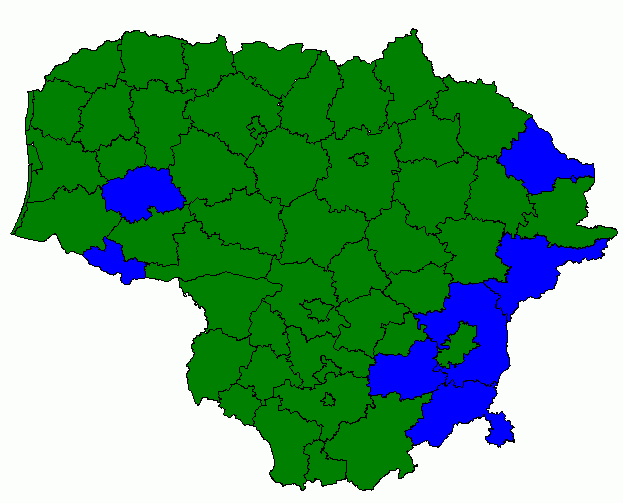
- Second round results by municipality Grybauskaitė Balčytis
President before election
Dalia Grybauskaitė
Independent
Elected President
Dalia Grybauskaitė
Independent

Presidential elections were held in Lithuania on 11 May 2014, with a second round held on 25 May between the top two candidates from the first round. In the second round, incumbent President Dalia Grybauskaitė was re-elected with 58% of the vote. Second round took place alongside the 2014 European elections.

== Electoral changes ==
Since these elections all potential voters, living permanently or temporarily outside of Republic of Lithuania, had to submit documents to Central Election Commission's register.

== Participating candidates ==
Initially 12 candidates were officially confirmed to participate, but only 7 fulfilled the criterion of 20,000 supporting signatures.

- Zigmantas Balčytis (Social Democratic Party), Member of the European Parliament
- Dalia Grybauskaitė, incumbent President of Lithuania (2009–2014)
- Artūras Paulauskas (Labour Party), member of Seimas
- Naglis Puteikis, member of Seimas
- Bronis Ropė (Lithuanian Peasant and Greens Union), Mayor of Ignalina
- Valdemar Tomaševski, Member of the European Parliament
- Artūras Zuokas (YES), Mayor of Vilnius

Grybauskaitė was supported by the Homeland Union and Liberal Movement.

Unsuccessful candidates include: Rolandas Paksas, Linas Balsys, Kristina Brazauskienė, Vladas Lašas, Jonas Lašinis and Rolandas Paulauskas.

== Opinion polls ==
Candidate	Spinter Tyrimai 7–15 April 2014	Vilmorus/Lietuvos Rytas 4–9 April 2014	Spinter Tyrimai 15–20 March 2014	Lietuvos rytas 13–17 March 2014	Spinter Tyrimai 21–28 February 2014	Lietuvos rytas 14–23 February 2014	Spinter Tyrimai 16–26 January 2014	Spinter Tyrimai November 2013	Spinter Tyrimai 18–31 October 2013
Dalia Grybauskaitė	42.5	46.9	39.3	40.9	40.9	43.3	39.7	36.0	36.5
Zigmantas Balčytis	12.4	9.9	9.7	10.3	8.9	8.3	8.6	3.0	3.3
Artūras Paulauskas	9.9	10.5	8.9	9.6	6.6	7.3	3.6	2.3	2.1
Naglis Puteikis	3.5	4.9							
Valdemar Tomaševski	2.9	3.7	2.8	3.4	1.8		2.0	2.4	2.2
Bronis Ropė	2.5	3.4	2.3	4.1	2.3		2.0		
Artūras Zuokas	3.0	2.5	2.6	2.3	2.9		2.9	2.1	2.2
Linas Balsys	—N/a	—N/a	—N/a	3.8	2.2	4.1			0.5
Rolandas Paulauskas	—N/a	—N/a	—N/a	1.1					
Kristina Brazauskienė	—N/a	—N/a	—N/a	0.6					
Vladas Lašas	—N/a	—N/a	—N/a	0.5					
Jonas Lašinis	—N/a	—N/a	—N/a	0.3					
Rolandas Paksas	—N/a	—N/a	—N/a	—N/a	9.7	14.8	7.6	7.6	4.3
(Undecided)	14.9	18.2	17.7	19.1	8.8		14.4	10.3	10.7
(Not planned to vote)	8.4		9.5		7.6		9.5	11.3	10.9

== Results ==
Candidate	Party	First round		Second round	
Candidate	Party	Votes	%	Votes	%
Dalia Grybauskaitė	Independent	612,485	46.64	701,999	59.08
Zigmantas Balčytis	Social Democratic Party	181,659	13.83	486,214	40.92
Artūras Paulauskas	Labour Party	160,139	12.19		
Naglis Puteikis	Independent	124,333	9.47		
Valdemar Tomaševski	Electoral Action of Poles in Lithuania	109,659	8.35		
Artūras Zuokas	YES	69,677	5.31		
Bronis Ropė	Lithuanian Farmers and Greens Union	55,263	4.21		
Total		1,313,215	100.00	1,188,213	100.00
Valid votes		1,313,215	98.47	1,188,213	98.01
Invalid/blank votes		20,451	1.53	24,161	1.99
Total votes		1,333,666	100.00	1,212,374	100.00
Registered voters/turnout		2,553,335	52.23	2,559,398	47.37
Source: Central Election Commission, Central Election Commission
