= 2024 Lithuanian presidential election =

- 12 May 2024 (first round); 26 May 2024 (second round)
- Turnout: 59.95% (first round) ▲2.58pp 49.74% (second round) ▼4.14pp
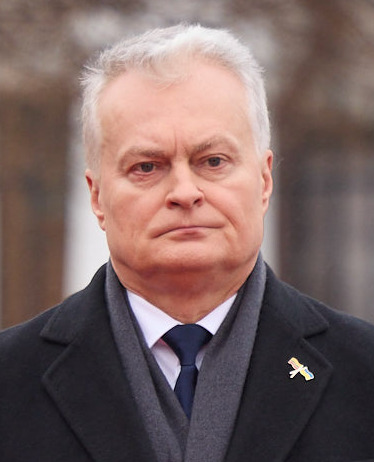

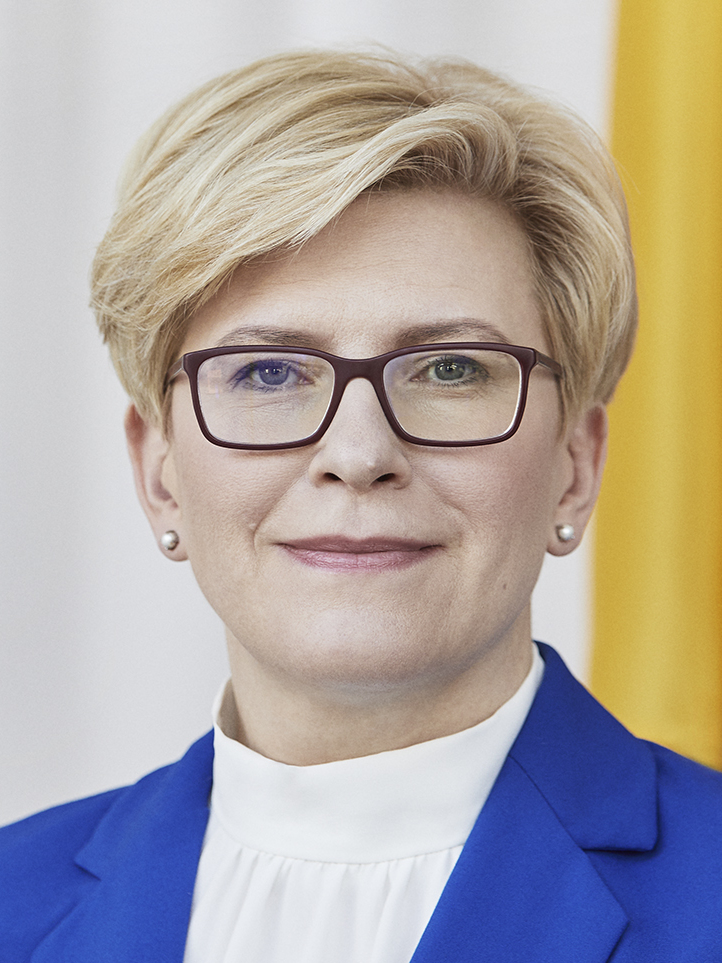
Candidate	Gitanas Nausėda	Ingrida Šimonytė
Party	Independent (Note: Supported by the Social Democratic Party of Lithuania and the Lithuanian Regions Party)	TS–LKD
Popular vote	886,874	291,054
Percentage	75.29%	24.71%
President before election
Gitanas Nausėda
Independent
Elected President
Gitanas Nausėda
Independent

Presidential elections were held in Lithuania on 12 May 2024, alongside a referendum on allowing multiple citizenships. Incumbent President Gitanas Nausėda won re-election to a second term. When candidate registrations closed before the election, the Lithuanian Central Election Commission had confirmed fifteen viable registrations; of those, twelve proceeded to collect signatures from the minimum 20,000 voters. Four of those contenders were later repudiated or dropped out, leaving eight on the ballot.

A second round was held on 26 May as no candidate received an absolute majority in the first round. This saw Nausėda and Prime Minister Ingrida Šimonytė facing off in the runoff, a rematch of the 2019 election in which Nausėda had defeated Šimonytė. Nausėda won re-election, defeating Šimonytė in a second-round landslide with 75% of the vote – the largest margin of victory in a free election for any presidential candidate in the history of Lithuania.

== Background ==
The Lithuanian president has somewhat more executive authority than their counterparts in neighboring Estonia and Latvia; the Lithuanian president's function is similar to that of the presidents of France and Romania. Similarly to them, but unlike presidents in a fully presidential system such as the United States, the Lithuanian president generally has the most authority in foreign affairs. In addition to the customary diplomatic powers of heads of state, namely receiving the letters of credence of foreign ambassadors and signing treaties, the president determines Lithuania's basic foreign policy guidelines. The president is also the commander-in-chief of the Lithuanian Armed Forces, and accordingly heads the State Defense Council and has the right to appoint the Chief of Defence (subject to Seimas consent).

The president has a significant role in domestic policy, possessing the right to submit bills to the Seimas and to veto laws passed by it, appointing the prime minister and approving the government formed by them, and also having the right to dissolve the Seimas and call snap elections following a successful motion of no confidence or if the Seimas refuses to approve the government's budget within sixty days. However, the next elected Seimas may retaliate by calling for an earlier presidential election. In addition, according to a resolution by the Constitutional Court of Lithuania in 1998, the president is required by law to nominate the candidate of the parliamentary majority to the office of prime minister.

The president also holds informal power, as the office of president is generally more trusted by the populace according to approval polling, and Lithuanian presidents historically blocked legislation and forced the resignation of prime ministers (such as Gediminas Vagnorius in 1998).

== Electoral system ==
The president is elected using the two-round system. To win in the first round, a candidate requires an absolute majority of all votes cast (including invalid votes) and either voter turnout to be above 50% or for their vote share to be equivalent to at least one-third of the number of registered voters. If no candidate wins in the first round, a second round is required, featuring the top two candidates. All candidates for president are independent. While some candidates belong to and/or are supported by a political party, the office of the president is formally non-partisan.

Citizens of Lithuania at least 40 years of age whose at least one parent was also a citizen (natural-born-citizen clause), who have lived in Lithuania for at least three years prior, are not serving a prison sentence, are not on active duty in the Lithuanian Armed Forces, are not bound to any other country by an oath and have never been impeached, are allowed to run for president. Each candidate must collect at least 20 thousand signatures by Lithuanian citizens to be able to run for election.

== Candidates ==
All pre-registered candidates were required to finalize the registration procedure by 8 March 2024, in order to commence the collection of signatures for the confirmation of their candidacy. Ten out of 15 candidates completed this before the start of the procurement phase. Two candidates managed to resolve it afterwards. Three other aspirants chose against launching a presidential bid or were eliminated due to the failure to complete the procedure before the deadline.

All declared candidates for president had to gather 20,000 signatures physically or online in order to be registered and present them by 28 March 2024 at 17:00 EET. Four failed or dropped out in the process, so the following eight candidates appeared on the ballot on 12 May.

Name	Born	Experience	Party	Endorsed by
Giedrimas Jeglinskas	April 22, 1979 (age 47); Kaunas	Senior Fellow at Atlantic Council (2022–present); Assistant Secretary General of NATO for Executive Management (2019–2022); Vice-Minister of Defence (2017–2019); Vice President in Corporate Banking at Citigroup (2010–2017)	Independent	Union of Democrats "For Lithuania"
Andrius Mazuronis	July 13, 1979 (age 47); Vilnius	Deputy Speaker of the Seimas (2020–current); Member of the Seimas (2008–current)	Labour Party	
Gitanas Nausėda	May 19, 1964 (age 62); Klaipėda	President of Lithuania (2019–current); Chief Economist to the Chairman of SEB bankas (2008–2018); Director of Monetary Policy at the Bank of Lithuania (1996–2000)	Independent	Lithuanian Regions Party
Gitanas Nausėda	May 19, 1964 (age 62); Klaipėda	President of Lithuania (2019–current); Chief Economist to the Chairman of SEB bankas (2008–2018); Director of Monetary Policy at the Bank of Lithuania (1996–2000)	Independent	Social Democratic Party of Lithuania
Ingrida Šimonytė	November 15, 1974 (age 51); Vilnius	Prime Minister of Lithuania (2020–current); 2019 presidential candidate Member of the Seimas (2016–present); Deputy Chairwoman of the Board of the Bank of Lithuania (2013–2016); Minister of Finance (2009–2012)	Homeland Union	
Eduardas Vaitkus	October 3, 1956 (age 69); Kaunas	Advisor to the Minister of Health (2005–2006); Professor at the Lithuanian University of Health Sciences (2002–2010)	Independent	
Ignas Vėgėlė	July 22, 1975 (age 51); Vilnius	Member of the Court of Honor of Lawyers of Lithuania (2022–present); Chairman of the Lithuanian Bar Association (2014–2022); Professor at the Mykolas Romeris University (2010–present)	Independent	~~People and Justice Union~~ (Note: TTS originally endorsed Vėgėlė in the election, but the party's chairman Petras Gražulis withdrew this endorsement and chose to run himself on 11 February 2024.)
Ignas Vėgėlė	July 22, 1975 (age 51); Vilnius	Member of the Court of Honor of Lawyers of Lithuania (2022–present); Chairman of the Lithuanian Bar Association (2014–2022); Professor at the Mykolas Romeris University (2010–present)	Independent	Lithuanian Christian Democracy Party
Ignas Vėgėlė	July 22, 1975 (age 51); Vilnius	Member of the Court of Honor of Lawyers of Lithuania (2022–present); Chairman of the Lithuanian Bar Association (2014–2022); Professor at the Mykolas Romeris University (2010–present)	Independent	Christian Union
Ignas Vėgėlė	July 22, 1975 (age 51); Vilnius	Member of the Court of Honor of Lawyers of Lithuania (2022–present); Chairman of the Lithuanian Bar Association (2014–2022); Professor at the Mykolas Romeris University (2010–present)	Independent	Freedom and Justice
Ignas Vėgėlė	July 22, 1975 (age 51); Vilnius	Member of the Court of Honor of Lawyers of Lithuania (2022–present); Chairman of the Lithuanian Bar Association (2014–2022); Professor at the Mykolas Romeris University (2010–present)	Independent	Lithuanian Farmers and Greens Union (Note: The Lithuanian Farmers and Greens Union announced on 29 March 2024, that they're dropping Veryga as candidate and reallocating their endorsement and campaign support towards Vėgėlė.)
Dainius Žalimas	May 22, 1973 (age 53); Vilnius	Dean of the Faculty of the Law of Vytautas Magnus University (2021–present); President of Constitutional Court of Lithuania (2014–2021); Justice of the Constitutional Court of Lithuania (2011–2021); Advisor to the Minister of Defense (1998–2011)	Independent	Freedom Party
Remigijus Žemaitaitis	May 30, 1982 (age 44); Šilutė	Member of the Seimas (2009–2024)	Dawn of Nemunas	

=== Withdrawn candidates ===
==== Registered ====
These individuals registered to run in the elections, but withdrew from the race before the first ballot. Candidates that withdrew until 2 April 2024 are eliglible to have their deposit refunded. They are also required to empty their campaign fund by refunding any remaining donations.

Name	Born	Candidate of	Experience	Announced on	Campaign	Signatures presented (Note: Dataset contains unauthenticated signatures, differing from the obtained ones.)	Withdrew on	Ref.
Arūnas Rimkus	23 February 1963 (age 63); Kaunas	ind.	YouTuber (2023–current); Member of the Šiauliai City Municipal Council (2015–2019); Psychiatrist at the Republican Šiauliai Hospital (1988–1998; 2004–current)	13 February 2024	23 February – 28 March 2024	1,030	9 April 2024	
Valdas Tutkus	27 December 1960 (age 65); Vilnius	KsV	Chief of Defence (2004–2009); Commander of the Lithuanian Land Forces (2001–2004)	5 October 2023	21 February – 28 March 2024 (Website)	19,303	2 April 2024	
Aurelijus Veryga	8 August 1976 (age 50); Užventis, Kelmė mun.	LVŽS	Member of the Seimas (2016–present); Minister of Health (2016–2020)	1 August 2023	21 February – 28 March 2024 (Website)	36,786	29 March 2024 (endorsed Vėgėlė)	
Gintautas Kniukšta	25 October 1960 (age 65); Rudaičiai, Klaipėda dist. mun.	ind.	Editor-in-chief of "ŠIANDIEN" (2017–current); Member of the Seimas (2000–2004)	15 February 2024	8–28 March 2024	766	29 March 2024	

==== Pre-registered ====
Until 19 February 2024, any eligible citizen had the opportunity to freely register for the upcoming election and start receiving campaign donations. However, the period solely served as a declaration to run and does not grant the permit to commence the collection of signatures of support. Every declared candidate must complete registration by 8 March 2024, which includes payment of the €8,995 election deposit.

Name	Born	Candidate of (supported by)	Experience	Announced on	Withdrew on	Ref.
Zenonas Andrulėnas	14 September 1967 (age 59); Andrulėnai, Molėtai mun.	ind.	Disqualified candidate for Director General of LRT in 2023; TTS candidate for Seimas in 2020	7 December 2023	8 March 2024	
Žilvinas Treigys	(age 54)	ind.	CEO of Glass Market (2000–current)	19 February 2024	3 March 2024	
Kęstutis Macevičius		ind.	Realtor (2006–current)	1 February 2024	2 February 2024	

==== Candidates that failed registration ====
Andrej Deivis Ginevičas, Antanas Kandrotas, Irma Gajauskaitė, and Jonas Jankauskas were denied formal registration as candidates due to their failure to provide all relevant documents during the registration process.

Petras Gražulis was denied registration as a candidate due to his ineligibility for the office, as he had been impeached by the Seimas in 2023.

=== Potential candidates ===
These individuals either considered a presidential bid or were proposed as potential candidates during the campaign.

Expand

==== Unregistered campaigns ====
These persons had publicly launched their campaigns but refrained from attempting to register as candidates for the election.

Name	Born	Experience	Party endorsements	Announced on	Withdrew on	Ref.
Artūras Paulauskas	August 23, 1953 (age 73); Vilnius	2014, 2002–03, 1997–98 presidential candidate Member of the Seimas (2000–2008, 2012–2016); Acting President of Lithuania (2004); Speaker of the Seimas (2000–2006)	Freedom and Justice (member of party)	28 November 2023	31 January 2024 (endorsed Vėgėlė)	
Mantas Varaška	May 26, 1979 (age 47); Kazlų Rūda	Mayor of Kazlų Rūda (2019–present); Member of the Seimas (2008–2012)	~~Lithuanian Regions Party~~ (Note: The Lithuanian Regions Party announced its endorsement of Varaška's candidacy in September 2023. Nevertheless, on 19 December, the party's board overwhelmingly voted to reject the decision and instructed the leadership to retract their support.)	24 September 2023	21 January 2024	

==== Political parties ====
===== Social Democratic Party of Lithuania =====
On 3 February 2024, the Social Democrats decided to not nominate a presidential candidate for the first time since 1998 and endorsed Gitanas Nausėda in the election.

- Vilija Blinkevičiūtė, Member of the European Parliament, party chairwoman, 2004 presidential candidate
- Gintautas Paluckas, Member of the Seimas, former party chairman
- Vytenis Andriukaitis, former EU Commissioner, 2019, 2002–03, 1997–98 presidential candidate
- Juozas Olekas, Member of the European Parliament
- Nerijus Cesiulis, Mayor of Alytus
- Vitalijus Mitrofanovas, Mayor of Akmenė, party vice-chairman
- Liutauras Gudžinskas, party vice-chairman

===== Homeland Union-Lithuanian Christian Democrats =====
All TS-LKD candidates withdrew after Šimonytė announced her bid.

- Gabrielius Landsbergis, Minister of Foreign Affairs, Member of the Seimas, party chairman
- Monika Navickienė, Minister of Social Security and Labour, Member of the Seimas, party vice-chairwoman
- Paulius Saudargas, Member of the Seimas, Vice-Speaker
- Laurynas Kasčiūnas, Member of the Seimas, chairman of the National Security Committee
- Arvydas Anušauskas, Minister of National Defence, Member of the Seimas

===== Labour Party =====
The party elected Andrius Mazuronis to be its candidate.

- Valentinas Bukauskas, Member of the Seimas

===== Liberal Movement =====
The Liberal Movement decided to not nominate a candidate for the forthcoming elections, and also against endorsing any other contender.

- Viktorija Čmilytė-Nielsen, Speaker of the Seimas, party chairwoman (withdrew)
- Petras Auštrevičius, Member of the European Parliament, 2004 presidential candidate

===== Lithuanian Regions Party =====
All candidates decline to participate in the election and the party declared support for Mantas Varaška. However, Valdas Tutkus launched a presidential bid on 5 October without the party.

The party eventually opted against fielding its own candidate. On 2 March 2024, it endorsed Nausėda.

- Živilė Pinskuvienė, Mayor of Širvintos (withdrew)
- Jonas Pinskus, Member of the Seimas, party chairman
- Valdas Tutkus, former Chief of Defence, former Commander of the Lithuanian Land Forces
- Andrius Palionis, Member of the Seimas

===== Union of Democrats "For Lithuania" =====
The party elected Giedrimas Jeglinskas to be its candidate.

- Saulius Skvernelis, Member of the Seimas, party chairman, former Prime Minister of Lithuania, 2019 presidential candidate (declined)
- Linas Kukuraitis, Member of the Seimas (withdrew)
- Vytautas Bakas, Member of the Seimas
- Algirdas Butkevičius, Member of the Seimas, former Prime Minister of Lithuania, 2009 presidential candidate

=== Declined candidates ===
- Dalia Grybauskaitė, former President of Lithuania
- Rolandas Paksas, impeached former President of Lithuania, former Member of the European Parliament
- Andrius Tapinas, journalist, writer, TV producer, presenter
- Waldemar Tomaszewski, Member of the European Parliament, leader of the Electoral Action of Poles of Lithuania, 2019, 2014, 2009 presidential candidate

=== Ineligible candidates ===
These people are constitutionally prevented from standing for election for any office which requires an oath of office to the Constitution of Lithuania, including President of Lithuania:

- Petras Gražulis – until 2034 due to being convicted during 2023 impeachment vote.

== Campaign ==
Incumbent President Gitanas Nausėda sought re-election against a range of opponents including Ingrida Šimonytė, his runoff challenger in the 2019 Lithuanian presidential election and incumbent Prime Minister of Lithuania. After announcing his bid on 7 December 2023, Nausėda became the clear frontrunner, while Šimonytė was the sole woman vying for the presidency. Former chairman of the Lithuanian Bar Association Ignas Vėgėlė was considered to be an anti-establishment candidate, although several candidates contended for the protest vote. Eduardas Vaitkus was regarded as the pro-Russian candidate in the election and received support from the Polish-majority Šalčininkai region and Visaginas, which is predominantly inhabited by ethnic Russians.

National security in the aftermath of the Russian invasion of Ukraine and the financing of the military, universal conscription, managing effects of the ageing population, cost of living, the One China Policy, ratification of the Istanbul Convention, Nausėda's 2019 presidential campaign and alleged connections with business interests from Russia and Belarus, the Šimonytė Cabinet and its conflict with Nausėda emerged as potential leading issues during the campaign. Both Nausėda and Šimonytė agreed on increasing defense spending and strengthening relations with NATO, but diverged on other issues such as economic policy and same-sex unions, which Nausėda opposes. Both candidates also shared diverging views on the Taiwanese Representative Office in Lithuania, whose naming after the island rather than the standard practice of using its capital Taipei led to diplomatic and economic sanctions from China. Nausėda supports having the office change its name, which Šimonytė opposes.

Following the results of the first round, Nausėda expressed thanks to the Lithuanian people for their support during his five years in office despite challenges such as inequality, while Šimonytė said the results indicated support for her premiership. Ignas Vėgėlė attributed his defeat to the distribution of votes among the candidates who campaigned on a change platform and his lack of political experience.

=== Candidate donations and funding ===
Campaign funding in elections in Lithuania is heavily restricted. The maximum amount each candidate is limited to raise is €2 million. Only individuals living in Lithuania and registered political parties may provide funding for a candidate. The candidate themselves may contribute a maximum of €36,000 or one fifth of their total declared income and assets. Individuals who had yet to declare income can only donate up to €50 through the entire electoral cycle, whereas individuals who had done so may contribute a maximum of €18,000 or one tenth of their total declared income and assets.

The system has been criticized for providing for a handicapped, monotonous campaign and diluting the chance of unknown candidates to spread their message to wider, untapped audiences.

Candidate	Total funding (including donations)	Party funding / share
Ingrida Šimonytė	310,007 EUR	300,000 EUR; 96.8%
Aurelijus Veryga	236,527 EUR	230,349 EUR; 97.4%
Gitanas Nausėda	232,098 EUR	6,008 EUR; 2.6%
Ignas Vėgėlė	204,720 EUR	—
Giedrimas Jeglinskas	109,531 EUR	107,755 EUR; 98.4%
Dainius Žalimas	71,524 EUR	34,772 EUR; 48.6%
Eduardas Vaitkus	45,527 EUR	—
Remigijus Žemaitaitis	36,537 EUR	—
Andrius Mazuronis	18,785 EUR	17,500 EUR; 93.2%
Valdas Tutkus	8,736 EUR	—
Gintautas Kniukšta	1,445 EUR	—
Arūnas Rimkus	0,100 EUR	—
Zenonas Andrulėnas	0,005 EUR	—
Kęstutis Macevičius	—	
Žilvinas Treigys	—	
Source: Central Electoral Commission (up to date for 31 May 2024)

== Opinion polls ==
Names in italic indicate politicians who have been added to presidential election opinion polls despite not considering a bid.

=== First round ===
Dates administered	Pollster	Sample size	MOE	Giedrimas Jeglinskas	Andrius Mazuronis	Gitanas Nausėda	Ingrida Šimonytė	Eduardas Vaitkus	Ignas Vėgėlė	Dainius Žalimas	Remigijus Žemaitaitis	Zenonas Andrulėnas	Gintautas Kniukšta	Arūnas Rimkus	Valdas Tutkus	Aurelijus Veryga	Arvydas Anušauskas	Vilija Blinkevičiūtė	Viktorija Čmilytė-Nielsen	Dalia Grybauskaitė	Saulius Skvernelis	Andrius Tapinas	Other	Don't Know	Will Not Vote
13 May 2024	Election Results	1,412,305	—N/a	1.37%	1.39%	44.46%	20.02%	7.39%	12.47%	3.58%	9.33%	—N/a													
9 April 2024	Artūras Rimkus is struck off																								
2 April 2024	Valdas Tutkus drops out / is struck off																								
29 March 2024	Aurelijus Veryga drops out																								
29 March 2024	Gintaras Kniukšta drops out / is struck off																								
18–28 March 2024	S	1,009	± 3.1%	(Note: Received below 2% and is incorporated into the others section)		30.4%	10.1%	2.6%	11.9%	5.8%	4.2%	—N/a				3.1%	—N/a						7.6%	16.2%	8.1%
15–25 March 2024	B	1,115	± 2.9%	The incomplete results from a conducted poll were the only ones published.																					
15–23 March 2024	V	1,001	± 3.1%	1.3%	2.2%	40.2%	8.9%	2.0%	10.6%	2.0%	5.1%	—N/a	0.1%	0.1%	1.8%	4.0%	—N/a							15.2%	6.5%
8 March 2024	Zenonas Andrulėnas is struck off																								
22 February – 5 March 2024	B	1,021	± 3.1%	2.4%	2.0%	40.4%	9.1%	2.8%	11.1%	2.1%	5.6%	0.4%	0%	0%	2.1%	3.4%	—N/a							10.1%	8.5%
18–25 February 2024	S	1,017	± 3.1%			28.5%	12.8%	1.7%	13.4%	4.3%	4.7%				3.0%	2.6%	—N/a						5.8%	15.1%	8.1%
15 February 2024	Gintautas Kniukšta declares his candidacy																								
13 February 2024	Arūnas Rimkus declares his candidacy																								
February 2024	N	1,000		1.0%	0.5%	25.7%	19.4%	1.7%	8.8%	2.9%	4.2%	0.3%	—N/a		1.2%	2.4%	—N/a							27.0%	5.0%
8–17 February 2024	V	1,002		0.2%	2.4%	37.4%	11.5%	1.6%	11.3%	2.0%	6.0%	0%	—N/a		2.7%	3.4%	—N/a							16.6%	5.0%
8–17 February 2024	V	—N/a	—N/a (Note: Allowed multiple choice)	0.3%	2.3%	39.1%	11.0%	1.6%	11.6%	2.3%	3.8%	—N/a			2.5%	3.6%	1.6%	10.2%	1.6%	6.4%	4.8%	0.5%	>7.1% Ramūnas Karbauskis on 2.2% Živilė Pinskuvienė on 1.1% Visvaldas Matijošaitis on 1.0% Viktor Uspaskich on 1.0% Gabrielius Landsbergis on 0.6% Waldemar Tomaszewski on 0.5% Jonas Pinskus on 0.4% Rolandas Paksas on 0.3%	—N/a	
January 22, 2024	Andrius Mazuronis declares his candidacy																								
January 22, 2024	Remigijus Žemaitaitis declares his candidacy																								
19–29 January 2024	B	1,021	± 3.1%	1.8%	1.8%	38.0%	7.4%	2.8%	10.8%	2.0%	—N/a	0.2%	—N/a		1.7%	3.6%	—N/a	9.2%	—N/a				1.8%	10.9%	8.0%
19–26 January 2024	S	1,012	± 3.1%			23.5%	10.9%		12.2%	4.1%	3.3%		—N/a			2.8%	—N/a	8.6%	—N/a				12.2%	15.7%	6.7%
15–23 December 2023	S	1,012	± 3.1%			25.8%	10.4%		12.8%	3.8%	2.0%		—N/a			3.5%	—N/a	6.6%	—N/a				11.3%	16.6%	7.2%
7 December 2023	Zenonas Andrulėnas declares his candidacy																								
7 December 2023	Gitanas Nausėda declares his candidacy																								
29 November 2023	Ignas Vėgėlė declares his candidacy																								
17–29 November 2023	S	1,015	± 3.1%		—N/a	22.5%	9.1%		7.9%	5.5%	3.3%	—N/a			2.1%	2.7%	—N/a	7.1%	2.6%	—N/a			7.3%	19.1%	10.8%
16–27 November 2023	B	1,018	± 3.1%	The incomplete results from a conducted poll were the only ones published.																					
14 November 2023	Dainius Žalimas declares his candidacy																								
11 November 2023	Giedrimas Jeglinskas declares his candidacy																								
17–28 October 2023	S	1,011	± 3.1%	—N/a		19.3%	10.1%	—N/a	8.8%	—N/a	3.6%	—N/a			2.2%	2.1%	—N/a	7.0%	3.0%	—N/a	2.8%	3.5%	11.1%	18.1%	8.4%
5 October 2023	Valdas Tutkus declares his candidacy																								
4 October 2023	Ingrida Šimonytė declares her candidacy																								
18–26 September 2023	S	1,013	± 3.1%	—N/a		23.2%	6.6%	—N/a	8.5%	—N/a	2.4%	—N/a				1.7%	2.8%	8.3%	4.2%	—N/a	2.4%	3.5%	10.1%	13.6%	12.7%
6 September 2023	Eduardas Vaitkus declares his candidacy																								
24 August – 5 September 2023	B	1,016	± 3.1%	—N/a	(Note: Received below 1% and is incorporated into the others section)	26.4%	4.4%	—N/a	9.1%			—N/a				2.2%	1.1%	2.2%	1.8%	11.6%	7.6%	3.1%	11.5% Rolandas Paksas on 1.3% Juozas Olekas on 1.1% Algirdas Butkevičius on 1.0% Various other on 8.1% (including: Mazuronis, Žalimas, Žemaitaitis)	18%	1%
1 August 2023	Aurelijus Veryga declares his candidacy																								

=== Second round ===
==== Gitanas Nausėda vs Ingrida Šimonytė ====
Poll source	Date	Sample size	Margin of error	Gitanas Nausėda	Ingrida Šimonytė	Other/ Undecided
Vilmorus	12–21 October 2023	1,001		53.6%	14.3%	32.1%
Norstat LT	11–19 October 2023	1,000		46%	28%	26%

== Conduct ==
Early voting for the first round was conducted from 8 to 10 May, during which more than 91,000 people, or 3.8% of eligible voters participated. Voting for those who cannot leave their homes was held from 10 to 11 May. On the first round of regular voting on 12 May, polling opened at 07:00 and lasted until 20:00 local time. The Organization for Security and Cooperation in Europe did not send election monitors to Lithuania for the first time after it turned down an invitation by the government due to its refusal to admit monitors from Russia and Belarus on national security grounds, which the OSCE said was a violation of its rules. This led Ignas Vėgėlė to criticize what he called a "lack of transparency" due to their absence. Two thousand other monitors were allowed to observe the election. No election-related incidents were recorded by Lithuanian authorities.

For the second round, early voting began on 21 May and closed on 23 May. Voting in designated locations outside normal polling areas was held from 22 May to 25 May, while voting for those unable to vote in person was held from 24 May to 25 May. Turnout in early voting reached 11.03% of the electorate. On 26 May, polling was held from 07:00 to 20:00. While voting was underway on 26 May, Nauseda was warned by the electoral commission after he issued a message on Facebook urging voters to await the results in the gardens of the presidential palace, which the agency deemed to be a possible violation of the rule of silence during election time. His office denied that the post amounted to electoral campaigning and that he would not remove the post.

== Results ==
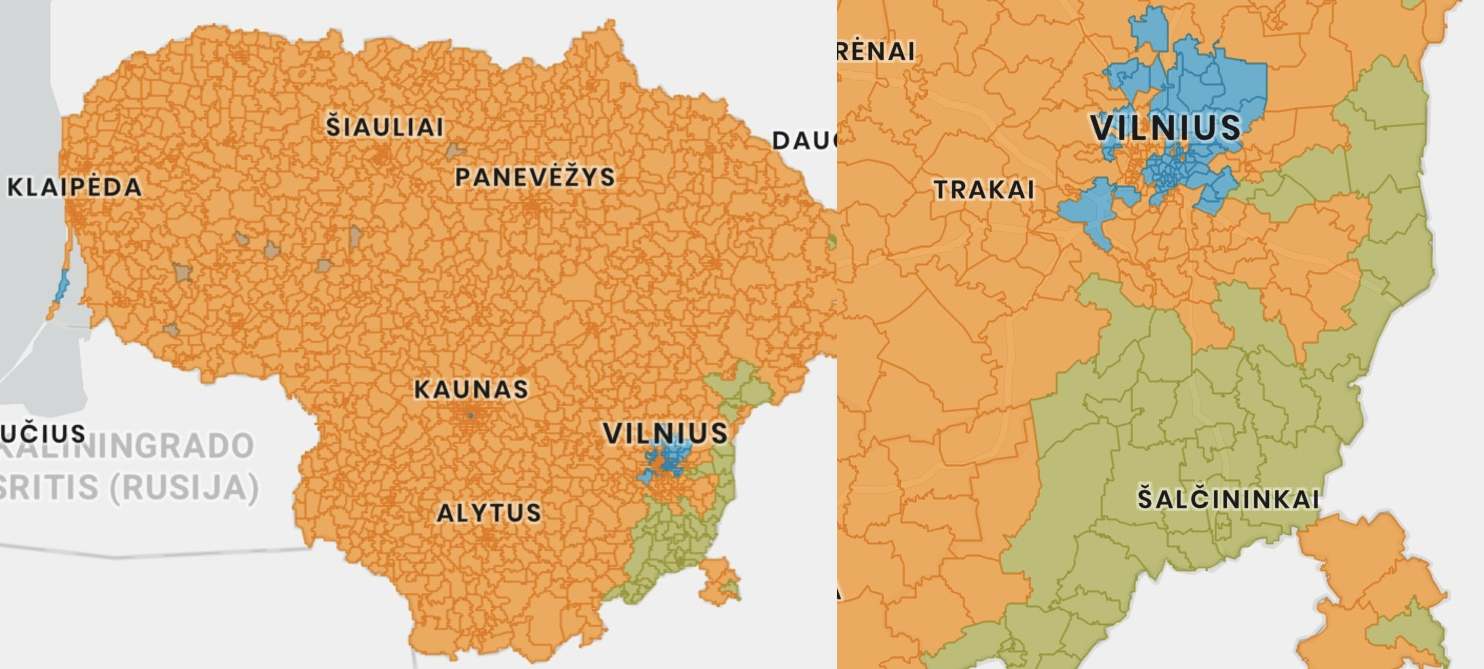
Lithuanian presidential election results (first round) Legend: – Gitanas Nausėda – Ingrida Šimonytė – Eduardas Vaitkus – Remigijus Žemaitaitis

No candidate received an absolute majority (over 50% of the votes cast) in the first round of voting on 12 May. A second round was held on 26 May. Of the eight candidates, incumbent President Gitanas Nausėda won 44.46% and Prime Minister Ingrida Šimonytė won 20.02% of votes in the first round, finishing first and second respectively, and they were the only two candidates to appear on the runoff ballot for the second round. Nausėda won the first round in all municipalities except in Vilnius, which voted for Šimonytė, and Šalčininkai and Visaginas, which were won by Eduardas Vaitkus. Turnout in the first round was at 59.37%, the third highest for an election in Lithuania since the 1993 and 1997 presidential elections.

After the first round, Šimonytė was endorsed by Žalimas, and Nausėda was endorsed by Žemaitaitis and Vėgėlė. Vaitkus stated that he will spoil his ballot. The second round results showed Nausėda winning about three-quarters of the vote, allowing him to declare victory. This was the highest majority for a presidential runoff in Lithuania.

Candidate	Party	First round		Second round	
Candidate	Party	Votes	%	Votes	%
Gitanas Nausėda	Independent	632,811	44.30	886,874	75.29
Ingrida Šimonytė	Homeland Union	288,774	20.22	291,054	24.71
Ignas Vėgėlė	Independent (Note: Supported by the Lithuanian Farmers and Greens Union, Lithuanian Christian Democracy Party, Christian Union and the Freedom and Justice)	177,863	12.45		
Remigijus Žemaitaitis	Dawn of Nemunas	132,599	9.28		
Eduardas Vaitkus	Independent	105,255	7.37		
Dainius Žalimas	Freedom Party	51,417	3.60		
Andrius Mazuronis	Labour Party	19,905	1.39		
Giedrimas Jeglinskas	Union of Democrats "For Lithuania"	19,766	1.38		
Total		1,428,390	100.00	1,177,928	100.00
Valid votes		1,428,390	99.19	1,177,928	98.49
Invalid/blank votes		11,607	0.81	18,073	1.51
Total votes		1,439,997	100.00	1,196,001	100.00
Registered voters/turnout		2,401,807	59.95	2,404,421	49.74
Source: VRK

=== By municipality ===
==== First round ====
First round results by municipality
Municipality	Nausėda		Šimonytė		Vėgėlė		Žemaitaitis		Vaitkus	
Municipality	Votes	%	Votes	%	Votes	%	Votes	%	Votes	%
Akmenė	4,982	54.28	858	9.35	1,322	14.40	1,061	11.56	557	6.07
Alytus (city)	12,493	50.94	4,003	16.32	3,239	13.21	2,322	9.47	1,017	4.15
Alytus (district)	7,095	54.00	1,704	12.97	1,604	12.21	1,454	11.07	503	3.83
Anykščiai	6,115	51.59	1,888	15.93	1,476	12.45	1,073	9.05	567	4.78
Birštonas	1,232	48.89	445	17.66	346	13.73	236	9.37	99	3.93
Biržai	6,102	53.19	1,415	12.33	1,312	11.44	1,296	11.30	697	6.08
Druskininkai	4,888	45.89	1,888	17.73	1,711	16.06	967	9.08	561	5.27
Elektrėnai	5,736	52.32	1,612	14.70	1,337	12.20	936	8.54	717	6.54
Ignalina	3,706	51.19	959	13.25	885	12.23	679	9.38	552	7.63
Jonava	9,211	49.49	2,449	13.16	2,637	14.17	1,875	10.07	1,361	7.31
Joniškis	5,225	51.72	1,036	10.26	1,295	12.82	1,349	13.35	679	6.72
Jurbarkas	5,638	49.50	1,553	13.63	1,505	13.21	1,479	12.98	580	5.09
Kaišiadorys	7,770	55.94	1,946	14.01	1,607	11.57	1,151	8.29	668	4.81
Kalvarija	2,297	53.18	363	8.40	552	12.78	667	15.44	195	4.51
Kaunas (city)	66,972	44.36	37,306	24.71	19,294	12.78	10,223	6.77	6,975	4.62
Kaunas (district)	26,198	48.33	11,812	21.79	6,385	11.78	4,218	7.78	2,177	4.02
Kazlų Rūda	2,714	51.78	598	11.41	671	12.80	667	12.73	316	6.03
Kelmė	5,784	49.68	1,014	8.71	1,336	11.47	2,390	20.53	587	5.04
Kėdainiai	11,738	51.97	2,527	11.19	3,068	13.58	2,692	11.92	1,179	5.22
Klaipėda (city)	28,118	42.19	11,604	17.41	9,484	14.23	5,790	8.69	7,883	11.83
Klaipėda (district)	15,990	49.99	5,116	15.99	4,229	13.22	3,134	9.80	1,941	6.07
Kretinga	10,246	54.93	2,135	11.45	2,289	12.27	2,085	11.18	1,089	5.84
Kupiškis	4,180	52.93	1,007	12.75	969	12.27	901	11.41	370	4.69
Lazdijai	4,957	56.08	1,019	11.53	1,091	12.34	976	11.04	299	3.38
Marijampolė	12,513	50.59	3,499	14.15	3,433	13.88	2,708	10.95	1,122	4.54
Mažeikiai	11,823	49.60	2,470	10.36	3,374	14.15	3,345	14.03	1,680	7.05
Molėtai	5,067	55.24	1,578	17.20	828	9.03	796	8.68	405	4.42
Neringa	1,167	38.86	990	32.97	335	11.16	163	5.43	120	4.00
Pagėgiai	1,816	53.86	275	8.16	361	10.71	595	17.65	154	4.57
Pakruojis	4,643	52.66	866	9.82	1,189	13.49	1,310	14.86	444	5.04
Palanga	4,354	41.85	2,341	22.50	1,615	15.52	905	8.70	558	5.36
Panevėžys (city)	21,040	49.61	7,770	18.32	5,166	12.18	3,779	8.91	2,125	5.01
Panevėžys (district)	9,236	51.92	2,638	14.83	2,112	11.87	1,928	10.84	851	4.78
Pasvalys	5,841	52.43	1,324	11.89	1,424	12.78	1,392	12.50	620	5.57
Plungė	8,305	52.16	1,685	10.58	2,117	13.30	2,323	14.59	872	5.48
Prienai	6,419	52.97	1,613	13.31	1,626	13.42	1,276	10.53	483	3.99
Radviliškis	8,001	51.06	1,588	10.13	1,947	12.42	2,467	15.74	911	5.81
Raseiniai	7,954	54.22	1,531	10.44	1,851	12.62	1,946	13.26	582	3.97
Rietavas	1,746	49.32	383	10.82	391	11.05	673	19.01	179	5.06
Rokiškis	7,442	53.59	1,765	12.71	1,526	10.99	1,679	12.09	717	5.16
Skuodas	3,857	52.09	721	9.74	906	12.23	1,070	14.45	449	6.06
Šakiai	6,606	51.84	1,707	13.40	1,651	12.96	1,514	11.88	658	5.16
Šalčininkai	3,229	24.21	382	2.86	1,690	12.67	1,538	11.53	5,430	40.71
Šiauliai (city)	23,228	48.07	7,086	14.66	7,132	14.76	5,258	10.88	2,785	5.76
Šiauliai (district)	10,216	50.42	2,244	11.08	3,006	14.84	2,652	13.09	1,139	5.62
Šilalė	4,613	43.75	1,078	10.22	818	7.76	3,220	30.54	435	4.13
Šilutė	8,495	46.72	1,988	10.93	1,796	9.88	4,358	23.97	747	4.11
Širvintos	4,096	54.11	1,026	13.55	901	11.90	723	9.55	440	5.81
Švenčioniai	4,173	40.00	1,030	9.87	1,630	15.63	1,181	11.32	1,688	16.18
Tauragė	9,251	53.71	2,026	11.76	2,057	11.94	2,438	14.16	759	4.41
Telšiai	9,436	51.57	1,999	10.92	2,416	13.20	2,459	13.44	950	5.19
Trakai	6,378	40.79	2,396	15.32	2,287	14.62	1,557	9.96	1,934	12.37
Ukmergė	8,681	52.70	2,337	14.19	2,012	12.21	1,570	9.53	930	5.65
Utena	10,443	53.80	3,096	15.95	2,240	11.54	1,774	9.14	783	4.03
Varėna	5,804	55.26	1,643	15.64	1,100	10.47	979	9.32	449	4.27
Vilkaviškis	8,654	53.95	1,666	10.39	1,910	11.91	2,322	14.48	692	4.31
Vilnius (city)	90,897	32.66	96,244	34.58	30,707	11.03	13,020	4.68	25,194	9.05
Vilnius (district)	17,309	33.36	9,550	18.41	6,708	12.93	4,441	8.56	9,982	19.24
Visaginas	1,779	28.51	356	5.71	876	14.04	335	5.37	2,390	38.31
Zarasai	3,311	46.25	916	12.80	980	13.69	713	9.96	798	11.15
Diaspora	15,601	29.23	20,710	38.81	6,101	11.43	2,571	4.82	3,231	6.05

==== Second round ====
Second round results by municipality
Municipality	Nausėda		Šimonytė	
Municipality	Votes	%	Votes	%
Akmenė	6,945	88.27	923	11.73
Alytus (city)	16,339	80.13	4,051	19.87
Alytus (district)	10,116	84.13	1,908	15.87
Anykščiai	8,504	80.03	2,122	19.97
Birštonas	1,728	77.25	509	22.75
Biržai	8,426	84.35	1,563	15.65
Druskininkai	7,278	77.34	2,132	22.66
Elektrėnai	7,662	81.82	1,703	18.18
Ignalina	5,529	81.86	1,225	18.14
Jonava	12,715	83.98	2,425	16.02
Joniškis	7,604	87.33	1,103	12.67
Jurbarkas	8,300	83.45	1,646	16.55
Kaišiadorys	10,077	82.88	2,081	17.12
Kalvarija	3,478	89.36	414	10.64
Kaunas (city)	84,154	69.97	36,118	30.03
Kaunas (district)	33,089	74.07	11,581	25.93
Kazlų Rūda	3,867	84.93	686	15.07
Kelmė	9,149	88.55	1,183	11.45
Kėdainiai	16,923	85.69	2,827	14.31
Klaipėda (city)	40,693	77.65	11,711	22.35
Klaipėda (district)	22,534	81.30	5,184	18.70
Kretinga	14,021	86.09	2,266	13.91
Kupiškis	5,932	84.01	1,129	15.99
Lazdijai	6,871	84.92	1,220	15.08
Marijampolė	17,270	82.96	3,548	17.04
Mažeikiai	17,624	87.48	2,523	12.52
Molėtai	6,632	76.98	1,983	23.02
Neringa	1,694	56.60	1,299	43.40
Pagėgiai	2,624	89.50	308	10.50
Pakruojis	6,973	88.11	941	11.89
Palanga	7,267	71.07	2,958	28.93
Panevėžys (city)	26,787	77.39	7,828	22.61
Panevėžys (district)	12,603	81.94	2,777	18.06
Pasvalys	8,297	85.79	1,374	14.21
Plungė	11,930	86.94	1,792	13.06
Prienai	8,766	83.49	1,733	16.51
Radviliškis	11,972	88.15	1,610	11.85
Raseiniai	11,434	87.27	1,668	12.73
Rietavas	2,657	87.14	392	12.86
Rokiškis	10,334	83.97	1,973	16.03
Skuodas	5,893	87.99	804	12.01
Šakiai	9,359	83.63	1,832	16.37
Šalčininkai	10,107	94.70	566	5.30
Šiauliai (city)	32,169	81.45	7,327	18.55
Šiauliai (district)	14,801	86.13	2,383	13.87
Šilalė	7,940	87.15	1,171	12.85
Šilutė	13,721	86.72	2,102	13.28
Širvintos	5,672	83.09	1,154	16.91
Švenčionys	7,468	85.34	1,283	14.66
Tauragė	12,692	86.14	2,043	13.86
Telšiai	13,612	86.41	2,141	13.59
Trakai	10,393	79.75	2,639	20.25
Ukmergė	11,500	82.56	2,429	17.44
Utena	13,563	80.30	3,328	19.70
Varėna	8,037	80.11	1,996	19.89
Vilkaviškis	12,244	87.10	1,813	12.90
Vilnius (city)	123,645	56.61	94,787	43.39
Vilnius (district)	31,359	75.90	9,956	24.10
Visaginas	3,496	88.93	435	11.07
Zarasai	5,131	82.51	1,088	17.49
Diaspora	17,274	49.88	17,360	50.12

== Aftermath ==
Following the release of the election results for the second round, Šimonytė conceded defeat, and said that she would continue in office as prime minister. Nausėda acknowledged that the electorate had given him their mandate and said that he "will have to cherish this credit of trust". Final turnout was estimated at 49.61%.

== Reactions ==
Polish President Andrzej Duda congratulated Nausėda on his reelection and said he was "pleased that we'll be able to continue our excellent cooperation". Ukrainian President Volodymyr Zelenskyy also expressed his congratulations to Nausėda, citing the latter's support for Ukraine amid the Russian invasion.

== See also ==
- Elections in Lithuania
