= Aušrinė Norkienė =

Lithuanian politician (born 1975)

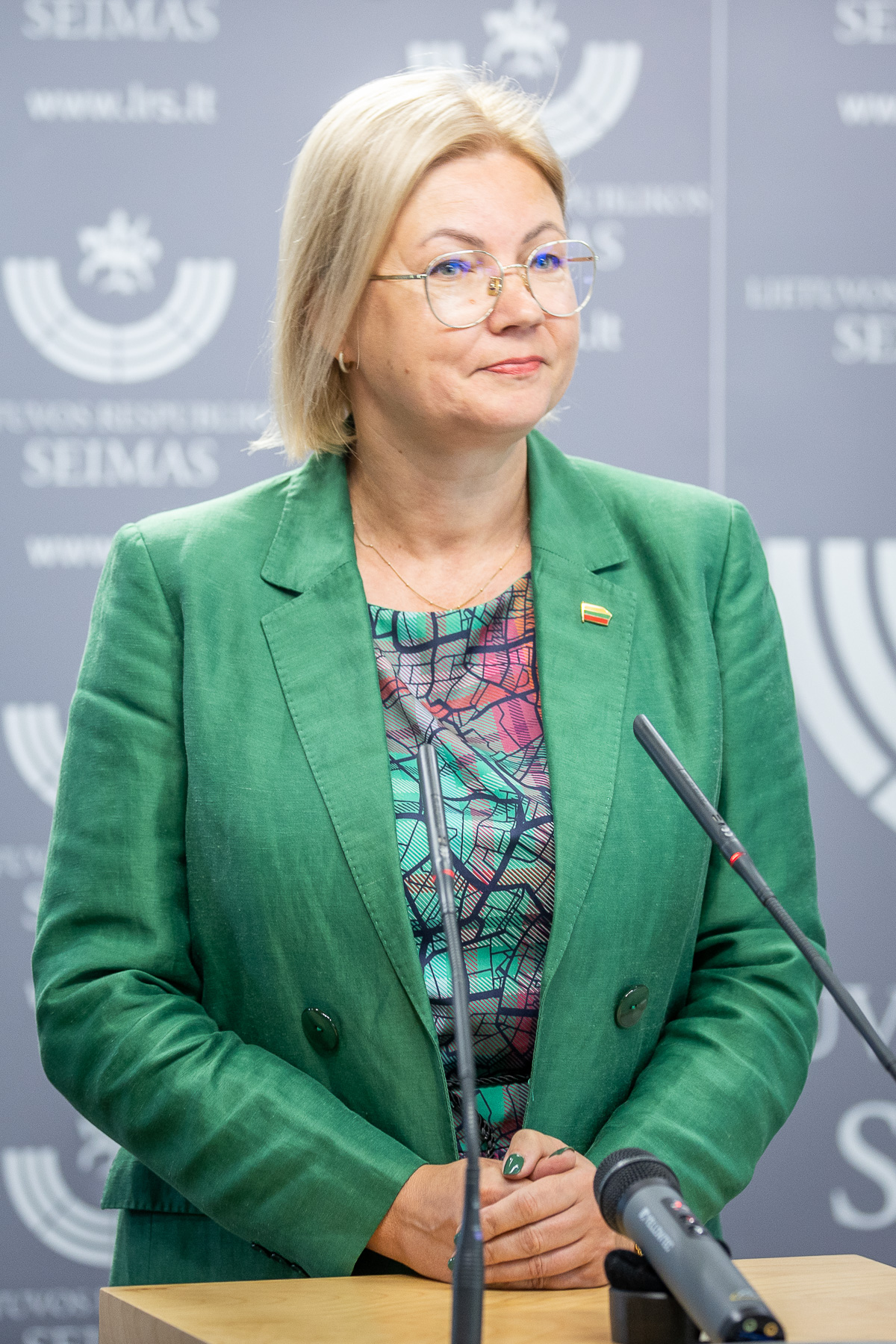

Deputy Speaker of the Seimas
- Incumbent
- Assumed office 11 September 2025

Member of Seimas
- Incumbent
- Assumed office 13 November 2020
- Constituency: Multi-member
- In office 14 November 2016 – 13 November 2020
- Preceded by: Darius Petrošius
- Succeeded by: Romualdas Vaitkus
- Constituency: Tauragė

Personal details
- Born: 12 January 1975 (age 51) Pagramantis, Tauragė District, Lithuania
- Party: Lithuanian Farmers and Greens Union
- Spouse: Marius Norkus
- Education: Šiauliai University; Klaipėda University; Kaunas University of Technology

Aušrinė Norkienė (born 12 January 1975) is a Lithuanian politician and deputy chair of the Lithuanian Farmers and Greens Union in the unicameral parliament Seimas.

== Early life ==
Aušrinė Norkienė was born in Pagramantis, Tauragė District Municipality on 12 January 1975. She passed her secondary school with a silver medal and completed her diploma in Primary School and Music Teacher in 1996. She holds master's degrees in Family Pedagogics (1998) and Public Administration (2012) from the Klaipėda University and Kaunas University of Technology respectively.

== Career ==
In 1997, Norkienė began her career as a music teacher at the Martynas Mažvydas Secondary School. She joined the Lithuanian Farmers and Greens Union party in 2007 and the same year became an adviser to the mayor of Tauragė District Municipality. A year later she was promoted to the post of mayor's assistant and in 2010 was appointed the Municipal Administration's deputy director. She served in this capacity until 2015 when she was elected the deputy mayor. The same year she became the head of the party's Tauragė division. In the 2016 Lithuanian parliamentary election, she stood and won from Tauragė. She is the deputy chair of the Lithuanian Farmers and Greens Union Political Group in the parliament.
