= Lithuanian People's Party =

Lithuanian People's Party Lietuvos liaudies partija
- Leader: Tauras Jakelaitis
- Founder: Kazimira Prunskienė
- Founded: 27 March 2010
- Split from: Lithuanian Peasant Popular Union
- Headquarters: A. Stulginskio g. 4/7, Vilnius
- Membership: 2500
- Ideology: Russophilia; Antimilitarism; Hard Euroscepticism; Anti-Americanism; Populism; Left conservatism Left-wing nationalism Social conservatism
- Political position: Left-wing
- Seimas: 0 / 141
- European Parliament: 0 / 12
- Municipal councils: 0 / 1,461
- Mayors: 0 / 60

The Lithuanian People's Party (Lithuanian: Lietuvos liaudies partija) is a minor pro-Russian political party in Lithuania. It describes itself as left-of-centre. It was founded in 2010 as a split from the Lithuanian Peasant Popular Union, and was led by the party's former chairman and the first prime minister of independent Lithuania, Kazimira Prunskienė. It has no representatives on the European, national or municipal level.

== History ==
After having left the party to run in the 2009 presidential election, Kazimira Prunskienė announced her intention to create a new political party in 2009. Its initiative group was made up of former members of the Peasant Popular Union. Prunskienė cited her conflict with Ramūnas Karbauskis, the party's new chairman, and its narrow focus on farmers as her reasons to establish a new party.

The party was founded as the Lithuanian People's Movement (Lithuanian: Lietuvos liaudies sąjūdis) on 5 December 2009. The party's founding conference was attended by Konstantin Kosachev, member of the State Duma of the Russian Federation and the United Russia party, who described the new party as United Russia's first partner in Lithuania. As the name was already reserved, however, the party held a second founding conference on 27 March 2010 where it renamed itself to its current name.

It won seven seats in the 2011 Lithuanian municipal elections, its most successful election result.

On 26 September 2011, the party signed a cooperation agreement with United Russia, which Prunskienė described as a pragmatic defense of national interests.

In 2014, Andrius Šedžius, businessman and former member of the Social Democratic Party of Lithuania, was elected as the party's new chairman, after Prunskienė was hospitalized because of a heart attack. It was also joined by the National Party "Lithuanian Path" (Lithuanian: Tautinė partija „Lietuvos kelias“), led by Lilijana Astra, known for its criticism towards the Polish community and their demand for allowing non-Lithuanian letters in state documents. The party attempted to run in the 2014 European Parliament election and its list was led by Milda Bartašiūnaitė-Rudalevičienė, a former member of the Liberal Movement and a self-described "sex expert" known for a sexting scandal with Minister of Education Gintaras Steponavičius, but did not collect the required number of signatures.

The party's committee voted to expel Šedžius in March 2015, violating the party's statute. A party conference was supposed to be held, but Šedžius instead joined Order and Justice and attempted to dissolve the party. The party remained and far-right, eurosceptic and anti-NATO politician Rolandas Paulauskas, signatory of the 1990 Act of the Re-Establishment of the State of Lithuania, was temporarily elected chairman instead.

Tauras Jakelaitis temporarily held the position of chairman during the 2020 parliamentary election, while the party's list was led by Nendrė Černiauskienė, former advisor to Minister of Health Aurelijus Veryga. She gained media attention for bringing a crooked wooden kriwe stick (krivūlė) to election debates. In the nationwide proportional election, the party finished last of parties that contested the election.

In July 2024, former candidate for president of the Republic of Lithuania Eduardas Vaitkus announced that he will lead the party to the Seimas of the Republic of Lithuania in 2024 Lithuanian parliamentary election.

== Political positions ==
The People's Party openly describes itself as a Russophilic party which seeks a cooperative relationship with Lithuania's eastern neighbours. It is considered a left-wing party. According to Prunskienė, the People's Party seeks compromise between business interests and social policy; it aims to "achieve balance and compromises, to combine favorable conditions for business, economic growth with the social responsibility of the state, the development of the capital with the development of the regions, the interests of the countryside and cities, the participation of women and men in politics, the cultural expression of Lithuanian culture and all ethnic groups living in the country."

During the electoral campaign for the 2020 parliamentary election, it was the only party which supported the withdrawal of Lithuania from the European Union. It also vowed to establish progressive taxation, ban propaganda against the traditional family, adopt a first-past-the-post electoral system and legalize representative recall.

It proposed normalizing relations with Belarus and ending the boycott on the Astravets Nuclear Power Plant.

== Election results ==
=== Seimas ===
Election	Leader	Votes (Note: Proportional representation votes.)	%	Seats	+/–	Government
2016	Rolandas Paulauskas	12,851	1.05 (#12)	0 / 141	New	Extra-parliamentary
2020	Vaidotas Prunskus	2,946	0.26 (#17)	0 / 141	0	Extra-parliamentary
2024	Tauras Jakelaitis (Note: Did not participate in the election. The party's list was led by independent candidate Eduardas Vaitkus.)	32,813	2.69 (#10)	0 / 141	0	Extra-parliamentary

=== Municipal ===
Election	Votes (Note: Municipal council election votes.)	%	Council seats	Mayors	+/–
2011	11,872	0.46 (#12)	7 / 1,466	0 / 60	
2015	4,961	0.49 (#11)	5 / 1,473	0 / 60	▼2
2019	Did not compete	Did not compete	0 / 1,442	0 / 60	▼5
2023	Did not compete	Did not compete	0 / 1,498	0 / 60	0
