= Eduardas Vaitkus =

Lithuanian doctor and political activist

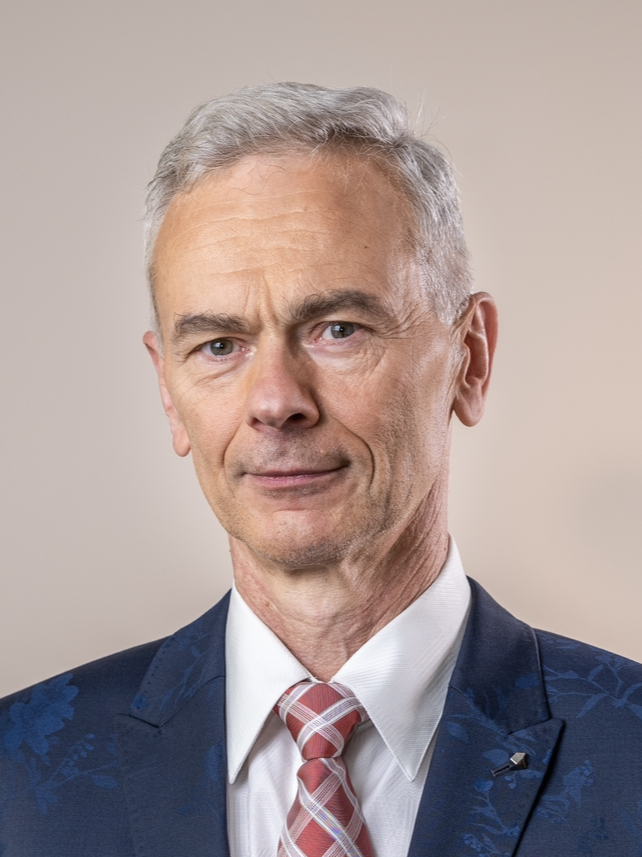

Advisor to the Minister of Health of Lithuania
- In office 2005–2006
- Minister: Žilvinas Padaiga

Personal details
- Born: 3 October 1956 (age 70) Kaunas, Lithuanian SSR, Soviet Union
- Party: Lithuanian People's Party
- Other political affiliations: National Alliance (2020); Labour Party (2005–09)
- Education: Kaunas Institute of Medicine

Eduardas Vaitkus (born 3 October 1956) is a Lithuanian retired doctor and political activist. He ran an independent campaign in the 2024 Lithuanian presidential election and subsequently led the Lithuanian People's Party ticket in 2024 parliamentary election.

== Biography ==
Vaitkus was born in Kaunas on 3 October 1956. He graduated from the Kaunas Institute of Medicine (now a part of the Lithuanian University of Health Sciences) in 1979 and worked in the Kaunas branch of the Institute of Endocrinology and Hormone Chemistry of the USSR Academy of Medical Sciences from 1980 to 1983. He has been teaching at the Lithuanian University of Health Sciences (until 2010 – at its predecessors) since 1983, and has been a professor of the hematology clinic since 2002.

Since 1983, he worked as a doctor in the Kaunas Clinical Hospital (formerly the Kaunas Red Cross Hospital). He resign from his positions in 2018, after 35 years. In 2011, he was accused by the hospital's temporary director Kęstutis Mazurkevičius of installing a covert listening device in his office. He further worked at Kardiolitos clinics between 2016 and 2020.

From 2005 to 2006, he was an advisor to Minister of Health Žilvinas Padaiga, who represented the Labour Party in the Brazauskas Cabinet II. He has authored over 40 scientific articles and has been awarded the Cross of Officer of the Order of the Lithuanian Grand Duke Gediminas.

He is married to Asta, a doctor of medicine and rheumatologist, and has three children: Nora, Andrius and Domonykas.

== Political career ==
Vaitkus has run for election to the Seimas two times, with the Labour Party in the 2008 parliamentary election, and with the Way of Courage in the 2020 parliamentary election, both times unsuccessfully.

Since 2021, he has actively campaigned against vaccination and participated in numerous protests. On 18 September 2021, speaking in a protest organized by Astra Genovaitė Astrauskaitė in Vilnius, he stated that "vaccinating children is a crime. The ratio of benefit to harm is not entirely clear and it is more likely that the harm is greater".

In July 2021, he established the Centre of the Lithuanian People's Resistance to Occupation (Lithuanian: Lietuvos gyventojų pasipriešinimo okupacijai centras), a political group unifying several anti-establishment and pro-Russian figures, and was one of the founders of Dawn of Justice, an unregistered party led by Algirdas Paleckis. His political group claims that the Government of Lithuania has violated the constitution and has established a dictatorship, and calls for the establishment of a special counsel system, referendum on membership in NATO and the European Union, etc.

He has called to deport Sviatlana Tsikhanouskaya to Belarus, described the Russian invasion of Ukraine as a proxy war instigated by the United States and stated that Lithuania joined the European Union "in a fraudulent manner". He has been accused of pro-Russian views by other anti-establishment and Eurosceptic leaders, such as Nida Vasiliauskaitė, who claimed that he intends to "turn Lithuania into a Russian protectorate". He claimed that Lithuania could leave NATO "in a single year" and that doing so would leave Lithuania safer. He claimed that he would begin separate negotiations with Russia about prevention of conflicts in Europe if elected president.

On 6 September 2023, he announced his run for President of Lithuania, stating that he intends to establish a "dictatorship of law" and unveil agents of foreign intelligence services in the Lithuanian government. On 26 March 2024, the Central Election Commission of Lithuania announced that it will not print Vaitkus' election program in the election information handbook, as several of its statements, such as disparaging claims towards Ukrainians in Lithuania and NATO, violated the Election Code. After a court order annulled their decision, the commission agreed to print an edited version of the program.

In 2024, he unsuccessfully led the Lithuanian People's Party ticket in 2024 parliamentary election.

=== Political ideology ===
Vaitkus expressed nostalgic views towards the Cold War period due to a perceived balance of safety and security between the world superpowers. According to him in 2024, now we are living closer to world's destruction then during the Cuban Missile Crisis.

== Controversies ==
Vaitkus holds many controversial and factually inaccurate views. In multiple media interviews, Vaitkus has claimed that Lithuania never joined European Union, disregarding Lithuania's EU referendum and Lithuania's accession process that took almost a decade. He has also claimed, without providing any evidence, that United Kingdom threatened to launch a nuclear attack on Russia in the autumn of 2021.

Vaitkus has also claimed, without providing evidence, that Lithuanian presidents Dalia Grybauskaitė and Gitanas Nausėda were trying to start a war with Russia. More than two years into Russian invasion of Ukraine, he claimed that the war was started by western countries and that Russian President Vladimir Putin does what any leader should do. Vaitkus has also claimed that 5G networks are a beginning to the procurement of mind-controlling technology.
