= Didžiokas =

- Lithuanian surname
- m.: Didžiokas
- f.: (unmarried): Didžiokaitė
- f.: (married): Didžiokienė

Didžiokas is a Lithuanian surname. Notable people with the surname include:

- Gintaras Didžiokas
- Rimantas Didžiokas, Lithuanian political and public figure, engineer, professor
