= Kazimira Prunskienė =

Lithuanian politician (1943–2026)

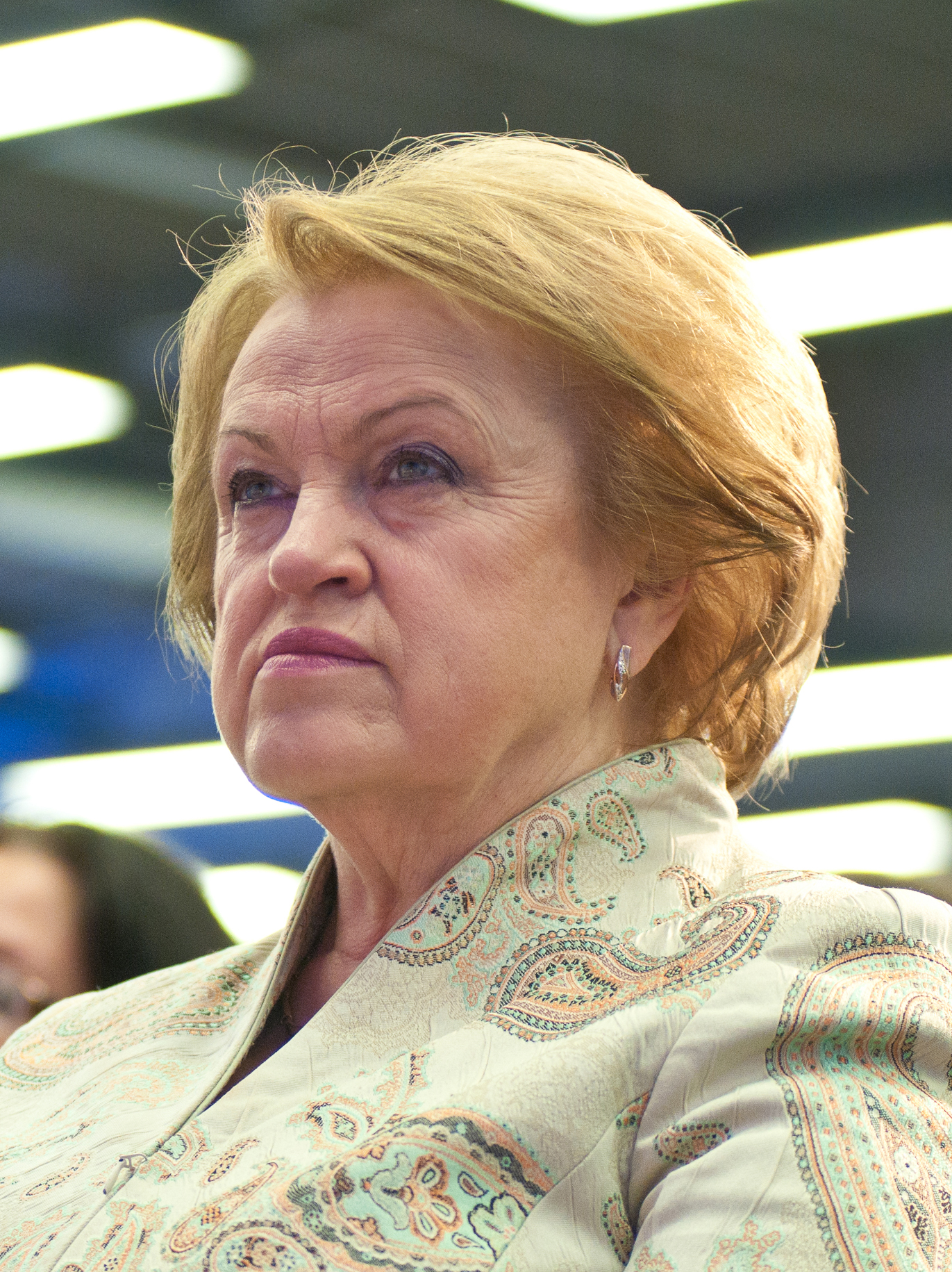
- Prunskienė in 2010

Minister of Agriculture
- In office 14 December 2004 – 9 December 2008
- Prime Minister: Gediminas Kirkilas
- Preceded by: Jeronimas Kraujelis
- Succeeded by: Kazimieras Starkevičius

Member of the Seimas
- In office 26 November 1996 – 17 November 2008
- Preceded by: Everistas Raišuotis
- Succeeded by: Valentinas Stundys
- Constituency: Molėtai–Švenčionys

1st Prime Minister of Lithuania
- In office 17 March 1990 – 10 January 1991
- Preceded by: Position re-established
- Succeeded by: Albertas Šimėnas

Personal details
- Born: 26 February 1943 Vasiuliškė, Reichskommissariat Ostland
- Died: 30 July 2026 (aged 83) Vilnius, Lithuania
- Party: People's Party (2009–2026)
- Other political affiliations: Sąjūdis (1988–1990); Communist Party (1980–1990); New Democracy – Women Party (1995–2001); Popular Peasants Union (2001–2009)
- Education: Vilnius University
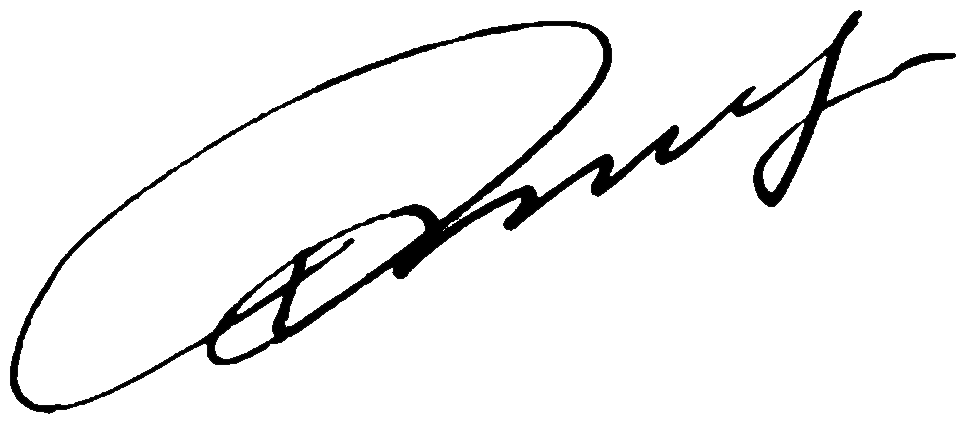
- Signature

Kazimira Danutė Prunskienė (née Stankevičiūtė) (26 February 1943 – 30 July 2026) was a Lithuanian politician who was the first prime minister of Lithuania after the re-establishment of the State of Lithuania in 1990 upon the collapse of the Soviet Union, and then Minister of Agriculture in the government of Gediminas Kirkilas.

Prunskienė was the leader of the Peasants and New Democratic Party Union and the Lithuanian People's Party. From 1981 to 1986 she worked in West Germany.

She ran in the 2004 Lithuanian presidential election against Valdas Adamkus, hoping to receive votes from supporters of impeached president Rolandas Paksas, but finished in second place in the first round and was defeated in the runoff.

Prunskienė was also a member of the Council of Women World Leaders, an international network of current and former women presidents and prime ministers whose mission is to mobilize the highest-level women leaders globally for collective action on issues of critical importance to women and equitable development.

== Early life and education ==
Prunskienė was born as Kazimira Danutė Stankevičiūtė in the village of Vasiuliškė, Ostland (now Lithuania) on 26 February 1943. Her father, Pranas Stankevičius, worked as a forest ranger and owned several hectares of land. He was known as a jolly musician who played many instruments at country weddings, including the guitar, fiddle, concertina, and a pipe of his own making. In 1944, when Kazimira was one year old, Stankevičius was killed by the Soviet NKVD for participation in the 1941 June Uprising.

She attended Vilnius University, earning her degree in economics in 1965 and later earned her doctorate from the same university in the same subject during the late 1980s. Afterwards, she stayed on at the university first as an instructor, then as a senior associate in the Department of Industrial Economics.

Before getting her first degree, Prunskienė married Povilas Prunskus. Between 1963 and 1971 she bore three children — a son named Vaidotas and two daughters called Rasa and Daivita. She later divorced her first husband and remarried in 1989 to Algimantas Tarvidas.

== Political career ==
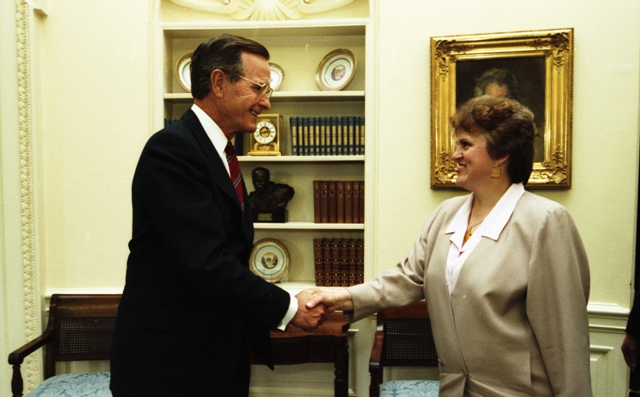
Kazimira Prunskienė (right) meeting President George H. W. Bush (left) in the White House on 3 May 1990

Prunskienė shifted slowly from university to government circles. Joining the Lithuanian Communist Party in 1980, by 1986 she began acting as the deputy director for the Lithuanian Soviet Socialist Republic's Agricultural Economics Research Institute. In 1988 Prunskienė helped found the grass-roots Lithuanian restructuring movement Sąjūdis, which eventually grew into Lithuania's leading pro-independence group. In late 1980s Prunskienė became Deputy Chairwoman of Council of Ministers of Lithuanian SSR.

She was elected to the position of the Prime Minister of the first government on 17 March by the Supreme Council of Lithuania. By this, she became the first woman to become Prime Minister of Lithuania and first Prime Minister after 11 March 1990. She immediately faced the problems brought on by an economic embargo set in place by Mikhail Gorbachev in an attempt to force Lithuania back under control of the crumbling USSR. Prunskienė flew to countries all over the world, including the United States, to try to gain support for negotiations with Gorbachev about the embargo through such committees as the Helsinki Commission. After nine months in office, Prunskienė resigned and later headed the Department of Agriculture in Lithuania.

In 1994 Prunskienė left the Democratic Labour Party of Lithuania. The next year she became leader of the Lithuanian Women Party. She was also the leader of the Peasants and New Democracy Union, before leaving it in 2009. She established the Lithuanian People's Party soon afterwards.

== Illness and death ==
In 2012 Prunskienė suffered a stroke and her health declined. She did not participate in politics and public life again.

Kazimira Prunskienė died on 30 July 2026, at the age of 83.

== Writings ==
At the Vital Voices Conferences, held on 10 July 1997 in Vienna, Austria, Prunskienė published The Role Of Women In Democracy: The Experience Of Lithuania. Here she addresses women's vastly unequal pay in comparison to men, the conservative tradition of a Catholic country, and the general status of women and their level of political influence in Lithuania.

== Bibliography ==
- Smith, David. The Baltic States: Estonia, Latvia and Lithuania. Routledge. 2002
- Opfell, Olga. Women Prime Ministers and Presidents. Jefferson, North Carolina: McFarland and Co., 1993.
- "Hearing before the Commission on Security and Cooperation in Europe: Meeting with Prime Minister Kazimiera Prunskiene of Lithuania." Implementation of the Helsinki Accords. One Hundred First Congress Second Session. 1990.
- Prunskienė, Kazimira. "The Role Of Women In Democracy: The Experience Of Lithuania." 10 July 1997
- "Lithuania—Agricultural Minister keeps her position." The Baltic News Service 11 Sept 2007 1. 28 APR 2008
- Torild Skard (2014) 'Kazimiera Prunskiene' "Women of power – half a century of female presidents and prime ministers worldwide", Bristol: Policy Press ISBN 978-1-4473-1578-0

Political offices
Preceded by Juozas Ambrazevičius	Prime Minister of Lithuania; 17 March 1990 – 10 January 1991	Succeeded by Albertas Šimėnas
