= Romualdas Vaitkus =

Lithuanian politician and photographer (born 1966)

34th Tauragė Constituency for the Lithuanian Seimas
- In office 2020–2024

Personal details
- Born: 22 April 1966 (age 60) Tauragė, Tauragė County, Lithuania
- Education: Vytautas Magnus University Agriculture Academy; Vilnius University Šiauliai Academy

Romualdas Vaitkus (born 22 April 1966) is a Lithuanian politician and photographer. He was elected as a member of the 34th Tauragė Constituency for the Seimas during the Thirteenth Seimas election, serving from 2020 to 2024. Today, he runs various international art groups, has received an award for his research, and serves as an ambassador for a party called Green Tauragė (Lithuanian: Žalia Tauragė).

== Early life and education ==
Vaitkus was born in Tauragė, the capital of Tauragė County, in Lithuania. He attended Gaurė highschool, graduating in 1984.

From 1984 to 1991, he studied at the Vytautas Magnus University Agriculture Academy. He received a position as an engineer at a hydroelectric powerplant.

== Early career ==
From 1991 to 1995, he worked at the Tauragė Regional Museum (Lithuanian: Tauragės Krašto Muziejus) and became director of the nature department. From 1995 to 1996, he immigrated to the US under an international internship for a farmers' exchange program.

From 1998 to 2010, he worked at a photography gallery again at the Tauragė Regional Museum. During this time, in 2003, he attended the Vilnius University Šiauliai Academy to study photography and videography. From 2010 to 2015, he was the head of the nature and photography department at the museum. From 2015 to December 2020, he was director of the museum.

== Creative work ==
The Lithuanian Photographers Association (Lithuanian: Lietuvos fotomenininkų sąjunga) is an organization for coordinating photography projects across the country. Vaitkus has been a member of the Lithuanian Photographers Association since 1999. He's received several staff and group invitations internationally for exhibitions.

Vaitkus has also established and runs the Tauragė Photography Club since 2005, with one of his members, simply known as Kadras, organising exhibitions for foreign attendees. He won the "Tauragė County Honor Award" (Lithuanian: Tauragės apskrities Garbės ženklu) in 2007 for art research.

== Political career ==
He commonly assists in overseeing Lithuania's environmental protection, development of sustainable energy, and natural resources management. He's been elected as ambassador of Green Tauragė to accomplish this locally.

=== Member of the Seimas ===
On 13 November 2020, he became a member of the Liberals' Movement (LB) and was elected to the Seimas to participate in the Thirteenth Seimas in a single-member constituency during the second round election. He won the 34th Tauragė Constituency.

His party, which consisted of thirteen members, weren't in agreement on some policies. Of these, including Vaitkus: Juozas Baublys, Ričardas Juška, Viktoras Pranckietis, and Jonas Varkalys, worked to decriminalize small quantities of certain narcotics, enforce mandatory vaccinations for doctors and social workers, and oppose same-sex marriage.

He left the party on 14 November 2020.

=== National defence meeting ===
In 2026, at a meeting with the Deputy Minister of National Defense, Tomas Godliauskas, and Klaipėda University political scientist Gabrielė Burbulytė-Tsiskarishvili, they discussed how to approach Tauragė's growth, alongside other regions; the city was described as being the fastest growing economical and business region in Lithuania. They suggested that regional growth across the country can be utilised to improve Lithuania's defense and economic growth; however, they might conflict if they both intertwine too much with each other, suggesting the government needs to make a decision to prioritise one of them.

=== Green Tauragė ===
Green Tauragė is an environmentalist party run by Vaitkus. They state that they want to become climate-neutral by 2030. They are part of the European Commission. They believe that this will improve Lithuania's quality of life, enhance institutional competition, create easier access to city funding, bring new innovations to the city, grow the city's networks, and increase local tourism.

== Political views ==
Vaitkus opposes same-sex marriage.
