= Vasiuliškė =

- Village
- Location of Vasiuliškė
- Coordinates: 55°16′43″N 25°54′8″E
- Country: Lithuania
- Ethnographic region: Aukštaitija
- County: Vilnius
- Municipality: Švenčionys
- Eldership: Kaltanėnai

Population (2011)
  - Total: 1
- Time zone: UTC+2 (EET)
  - Summer (DST): UTC+3 (EEST)

Vasiuliškė is a village in Švenčionys District Municipality, in Vilnius County, in southeast Lithuania. As of the 2011 Lithuanian census, it had one resident. It is the birthplace of Kazimira Prunskienė, Lithuania's first Prime Minister since its return to independence in 1990.

== See also ==
- Švenčionys
