= Giedrimas Jeglinskas =

Lithuanian politician

Member of the Seimas
- In office 14 November 2024 – 13 April 2026
- Succeeded by: Vilija Targamadzė
- Constituency: Multi-member

Assistant Secretary General of NATO for Executive Management
- In office 10 July 2019 – November 2022
- Preceded by: Wayne Bush
- Succeeded by: Carlo Borghini

Vice-Minister of National Defence
- In office 20 February 2017 – 10 July 2019
- Prime Minister: Saulius Skvernelis

Personal details
- Born: 22 April 1979 (age 47) Kaunas, Lithuania
- Party: Union of Democrats "For Lithuania"
- Education: United States Military Academy; Georgetown University; Columbia Business School

Giedrimas Jeglinskas is a Lithuanian politician and former NATO official who was the candidate of the Union of Democrats "For Lithuania" in the 2024 Lithuanian presidential election. Previously, he served as Assistant Secretary General of NATO from 2019 to 2022 and Vice-Minister of National Defence from 2017 to 2019.

== Biography ==
Jeglinskas was born in Kaunas on 22 April 1979 and enrolled in the Kaunas University of Technology in 1997, studying management, but left for the United States Military Academy after one year of studies. He finished with a bachelor's degree in political science, and also acquired a master's degree in national security in Georgetown University and a master's degree in business management in the Columbia Business School.

He served in the Lithuanian Armed Forces, in the Grand Duke Algirdas Mechanised Infantry Battalion as a platoon commander, as well as a senior intelligence analyst in the Second Investigation Department, before moving to the reserve.

He was employed at Citigroup as vice president in Corporate Banking from 2010 to 2017.

== Political career ==
=== Early career ===
Jeglinskas was appointed as Vice-Minister of National Defence in February 2017, responsible for defense system procurement, citing his experience in the military and the business world. During his tenure, he reformed defense system procurement and established the Defence Materiel Agency, responsible for organising public procurements and ensuring efficient use of funds.

In July 2019, he left his post in the ministry and was hired as NATO Assistant Secretary General for Executive Management, responsible for human resources policy, budget planning, IT and daily operation of NATO headquarters. He was the first representative of Lithuania in NATO headquarters since its accession to the alliance in 2004. During the Russian invasion of Ukraine, he was frequently invited by news outlets to commentate as an expert on national defense.

=== 2024 presidential campaign ===
Jeglinskas was among the potential 2024 presidential election candidates put forward by members of the Union of Democrats "For Lithuania" in November 2023. After party chairman and 2019 presidential election candidate Saulius Skvernelis refused to run again, the party nominated Jeglinskas on 11 November. In his nomination acceptance speech, he criticized the incumbent president Gitanas Nausėda's lack of cooperation with the government and advocated for higher defense spending.

He expressed his support for the "yes" vote in the 2024 Lithuanian constitutional referendum on permitting multiple citizenship.
