= Ignas Vėgėlė =

Lithuanian jurist and politician

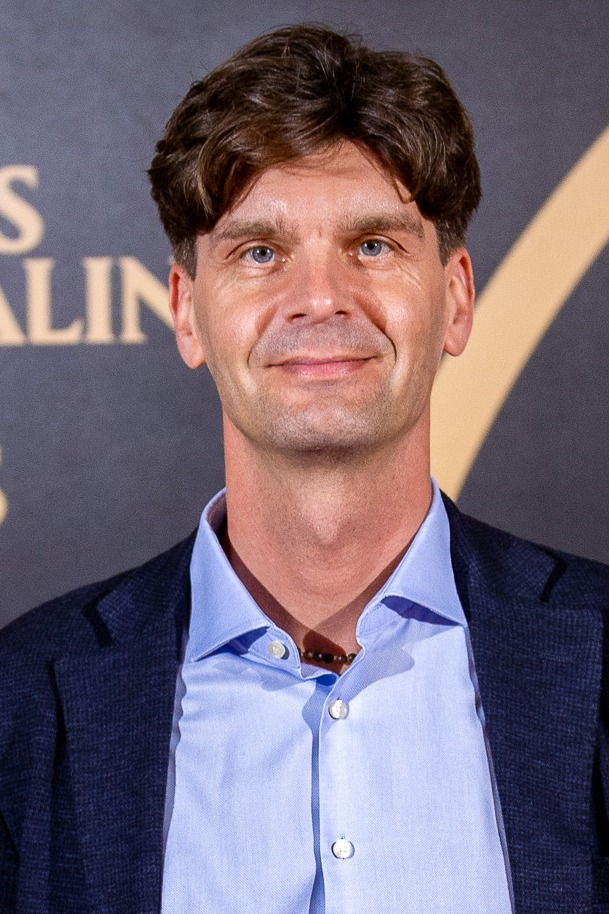

Member of the Seimas
- Incumbent
- Assumed office 14 November 2024
- Constituency: Multi-member

Chairman of the board of the Lithuanian Christian Democrats (Interim)
- In office 2004–2006
- Party Chairman: Valentinas Stundys

Personal details
- Born: 22 July 1975 (age 51) Vilnius, Lithuania
- Party: Christian Democratic Union (1994-2008); Lithuanian Christian Democrats (2001-2008)

Ignas Vėgėlė (born 22 July 1975) is a Lithuanian lawyer and right-wing politician who served as president of the Lithuanian Bar Association from 2014 to 2022, as well as president of the Lithuanian Lawyers' Association from 2013 to 2016. He was a member of the right-wing Christian conservative Lithuanian Christian Democrats from 1994 and served as the party's deputy chairman of the board from 2002 to 2004, and as interim chairman of the board from 2004 to 2006 (replacing Petras Gražulis). Upon the party's merger with the Homeland Union-Lithuanian Christian Democrats, he became an independent politician. In 2024, he participated in the Lithuanian presidential election and placed third, behind incumbent President Gitanas Nausėda and Prime Minister Ingrida Šimonytė.

== Biography ==
Vėgėlė was born in 1975 in the family of a Lithuanian Komsomol and professional unions functionary Algirdas Stasys Vėgėlė. in Vėgėlė graduated from the Vilnius University Faculty of Law in 1994 and gained a doctor's degree in law in the Law Academy of Lithuania in 2002. In 2006, he was awarded the title of docent. He worked at the Lithuanian Lawyers' Association from 1995 to 1996, then - in the law firm "Foresta" from 1996 to 1997 and in the international audit firm "KPMG Lietuva" from 1997 to 2002.

Vėgėlė was elected as President of the Lithuanian Bar Association in 2014 and re-elected in 2018.

As President of the Bar Association, Vėgėlė sharply criticized the handling of the COVID-19 pandemic in Lithuania and claimed that the pandemic restrictions imposed by the Šimonytė Cabinet violated the Constitution of Lithuania and human rights. Though he stated his support for Ukraine in the Russo-Ukrainian War, he questioned the transparency of crowdfunding initiatives for Ukraine, including the People's Bayraktar campaign initiated by Andrius Tapinas. Ewelina Dobrowolska, Minister of Justice of Lithuania, raised a disciplinary case against Vėgėlė, which he described as a political witch hunt. that was dismissed by the Disciplinary Court of Advocates.

== Political career ==
=== Early political career ===
Despite the belonging and membership of his father Algirdas in the Lithuanian Communist Party since at least 1972 and the official Soviet policy of state atheism adopted in occupied Lithuania, which was marked by the persecution of religious activists and dissidents, Vėgėlė became a member of the Christian Democratic Union in 1994 and ran as its candidate in Fabijoniškės in the 2000 Lithuanian parliamentary election. Vėgėlė described himself as a christian democrat and cited Viktoras Petkus and Zigmas Zinkevičius as his political inspirations. In 2001, the Christian Democratic Union merged with the Lithuanian Christian Democratic Party to form the Lithuanian Christian Democrats. Vėgėlė was appointed as the vice-chairman to chairman of the party board Petras Gražulis, replacing him as interim chairman after his expulsion due to his radical anti-LGBT views and refusal to participate in party activities.

In 2008, after the Lithuanian Christian Democrats merged with the Homeland Union to form the Homeland Union-Lithuanian Christian Democrats, Vėgėlė refused to join the new party. He criticized the party for their appeasement policy towards the Kirkilas Cabinet, insufficient conservatism and lack of interest in the social safety net. He defended the Lithuanization policies of Minister of Education Zigmas Zinkevičius in the Vilnius Region and attacked the Conservatives for the minister's removal.

=== 2024 presidential campaign ===
Ignas Vėgėlė officially launched his presidential campaign on November 29, 2023. In his campaign launch event, Vėgėlė stated his intent to defend "Christian values", fight lack of investment in education and healthcare, and combat "LGBTQ propaganda".

According to a Baltijos tyrimai poll, 5.5% of Lithuanians viewed Vėgėlė most favorably of all politicians in the end of 2023, making him the fifth most popular politician in the country. He organized an active campaign, including personal appearances in many rural municipalities. He received 12.35% of the vote and placed third, behind incumbent President Gitanas Nausėda and Prime Minister Ingrida Šimonytė. He may have achieved a stronger result, but the fragmentation of right-wing reform-oriented votes—partly influenced by Remigijus Žemaitaitis’s role in the race—likely affected his overall performance.

== Political positions ==
Vėgėlė describes himself as a Christian Democrat, but he is opposed to the Homeland Union-Lithuanian Christian Democrats and calls it a "left-wing party". He is endorsed by the anti-LGBT, anti-gender ideology political movement Lithuanian Family Movement. He supports same-sex legal regulation but opposes current proposals for partnership law in the Seimas due to the possibility of same-sex adoption, and opposes "LGBTQ propaganda".

In December 2023, Vėgėlė stated that should Ukraine be unable to defeat Russia in the Russo-Ukrainian War, it should pursue a negotiated peace, and he opposed escalation of the conflict.

Vėgėlė is a soft Eurosceptic - in an interview with Žinių radijas, he stated that Lithuania should remain a member of the European Union, but the European Union should remain an economic union and the powers of the member states should be safeguarded.
