= Bronis Ropė =

Lithuanian Politician, Member of the European Parliament

Bronis Ropė MEP
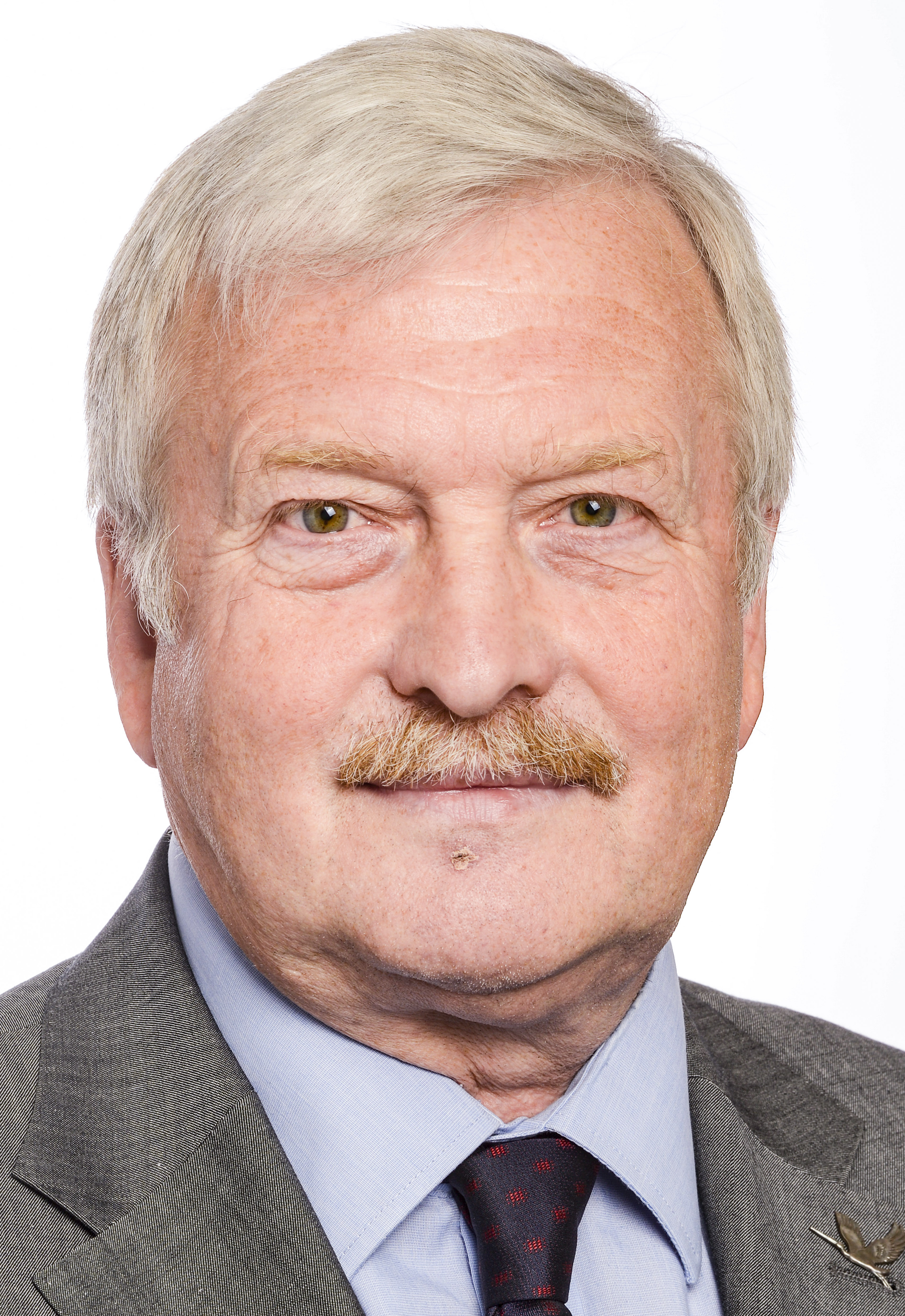

Member of the European Parliament
- In office 1 July 2014 – 9 July 2024
- Constituency: Lithuania

Personal details
- Born: 14 April 1955 (age 70) Degutėliai, Ignalina District Municipality, Lithuania
- Party: Lithuanian Farmers and Greens Union
- Spouse: Danutė Šileikytė-Ropienė
- Children: 2
- Education: Kaunas University of Technology

Bronis Ropė (born 14 April 1955) is a Lithuanian member of the European Parliament representing the Lithuanian Farmers and Greens Union (Greens–European Free Alliance). He was first elected in 2014 and was re-elected in 2019.

== Biography ==
He studied at the Kaunas University of Technology between 1974 and 1979 where he was elected chairman of the faculty trade union from 1976 to 1978. He was the mayor of Ignalina from 1995 to 2014. He is also the first vice chairman of the Lithuanian Farmers and Greens Union. He married his wife Danutė Šileikytė-Ropienė in 1985 and they have two sons.
