= Lithuanian Farmers and Greens Union =

Political party in Lithuania

Lithuanian Farmers and Greens Union Lietuvos valstiečių ir žaliųjų sąjunga
- Abbreviation: LVŽS
- Chairperson: Aurelijus Veryga
- First Vice Chairman: Aušrinė Norkienė
- Vice Chairpeople: See list: Kristina Kirslienė; Ligita Girskienė; Jonas Jarutis; Dainius Gaižauskas; Valius Ąžuolas; Bronis Ropė; Arvydas Nekrošius; Guoda Burokienė; Vaida Pranarauskaitė; Kęstutis Tubis
- Founder: Kazimira Prunskienė
- Founded: 2001 (as the Union of Peasants and New Democratic Parties)
- Merger of: Lithuanian Peasants Party; New Democracy Party
- Headquarters: Gedimino pr. 28, Vilnius
- Membership (2023): ▼3,741
- Ideology: Green conservatism; Left-wing populism; Christian democracy; Social conservatism; Agrarianism
- Political position: Centre-left to left-wing
- National affiliation: Lithuanian Farmers, Greens and Christian Families Union
- European affiliation: European Conservatives and Reformists Party
- European Parliament group: UEN (2004–2009); Greens/EFA (2014–2024); ECR Group (since 2024)
- Colours: Green
- Seimas: 6 / 141 (4%)
- European Parliament (Lithuanian seats): 1 / 11 (9%)
- Municipal councils: 185 / 1,498
- Mayors: 8 / 60

Website
- lvzs.lt

The Lithuanian Farmers and Greens Union (Lithuanian: Lietuvos valstiečių ir žaliųjų sąjunga, LVŽS) (Note: The party is also known as Lithuanian Peasant and Greens Union.) is a green-conservative and agrarian political party in Lithuania that was led by Ramūnas Karbauskis. The party is one of the representatives of the left wing of Lithuanian politics. Lithuanian journalist Virgis Valentinavičius described the party as "the mixture of the extreme left in economic matters and the extreme right in some social issues, all spiced up with an anti-establishment rhetoric of radical change".

Following the 2024 parliamentary election, the LVŽS has been in opposition to the Paluckas Cabinet. The party's one MEP sits in the European Conservatives and Reformists group in the European Parliament. Founded in 2001 as the Lithuanian Peasant Popular Union, (Lithuanian: Lietuvos valstiečių liaudininkų sąjunga, LVLS), the party's symbol since 2012 has been the white stork.

Formerly participating in the European Parliament group of the Greens–European Free Alliance, they joined the European Conservatives and Reformists in 2024.

== History ==
=== Foundation and participation in the Social Democratic Party-led governments (2001–2008) ===
In December 2001, the Lithuanian Peasants Party (Lietuvos valstiečių partija) and the New Democratic Party (Naujosios demokratijos partija) entered into an electoral alliance known as the "Valstiečių ir Naujosios demokratijos partijų sąjunga" (VNDS), which translates to the Peasants and New Democratic Party Union or Union of Peasants and New Democratic Parties was formed. In 2002–03 Lithuanian presidential election party's chairman Kazimira Prunskienė came with 5.04 per cent of the votes in the first round and saved its deposit. In the second round, she endorsed Rolandas Paksas of the Liberal Democratic Party, who won the election.

In the 2004 presidential election (after Rolandas Paksas was impeached), Kazimira Prunskienė narrowly came to the second position (21.25 per cent), but she was defeated in the second round (although, after endorsement of Rolandas Paksas). In 2004 European Parliament election, the party got 7.41 per cent of the votes and won one seat by Gintaras Didžiokas. He joined the Union for Europe of the Nations. In Seimas election later tahat same year, the party got 6.6 per cent of the votes. The Labour Party joined forces with Peasants and New Democratic Party Union and invited the Social Democratic Party of Lithuania to join. Brazauskas initially ruled out a coalition with Labour, but eventually Social Democrats and New Union (Social Liberals) joined forces with the Labour Party and the Peasants, with Brazauskas as the Prime Minister.

In February 2006, the Peasants and New Democratic Party Union led by Lithuanian politician Kazimira Prunskienė chose to rename itself the Lithuanian Peasant Popular Union (after the pre-war Lithuanian Popular Peasants' Union).

In 2008 parliamentary election the party felt below 5 per cent threshold and was left with three members, who were elected in single-member constituencies.

=== Opposition and leading force in the government (2009–2020) ===
In 2009 Kazimira Prunskienė left the party and founded the party of her own (Lithuanian People's Party). Although it was a minor party, it gained some influence in 2010 when it supported the Homeland Union-led government. The Lithuanian Peasants Popular Union changed its name to the Lithuanian Peasants and Greens Union in January 2012.

The party emerged as a dark horse in the electoral race in the spring of 2016. The rise of support was attributed to the popularity of Karbauskis, who had been active in campaigning against alcohol, and their lack of involvement in political scandals. LVŽS was further boosted by the announcement that Saulius Skvernelis, a Minister of Interior in Butkevičius Cabinet and one of the most popular politicians in Lithuania, would head the party's electoral list in the elections, without joining the party.

After successful performance in the 2016 parliamentary elections, a clarification about its English name format was issued, changing it to Lithuanian Farmers and Greens Union. Also, after these election the Lithuanian Farmers and Greens Union became one of the main three political parties in Lithuania (along with the Homeland Union and the Social Democratic Party) at the time.

After these elections, various pundits claimed that the Lithuanian Farmers and Greens Union could form a coalition with the Homeland Union, but Ramūnas Karbauskis proposed wide coalition between the aforementioned parties and the Social Democratic Party. The Homeland Union's leader Gabrielius Landsbergis himself proposed a coalition between the Homeland Union, the Lithuanian Farmers and Greens Union and the Liberal Movement, although both Ramūnas Karbauskis and the Liberal Movement's leader Eugenijus Gentvilas turned down this offer. Eventually, a coalition was formed between the Lithuanian Farmers and Greens Union and the Social Democratic Party of Lithuania, which lasted until the autumn of 2017.

The party's support gradually declined by 2018 (e. g. in 2019 European Parliament election the party got 11.92 per cent of the votes), although due to the rally 'round the flag effect (caused by the COVID-19 pandemic), its support rebounded. In the 2020 parliamentary election the party won 18.07 per cent of the vote and 32 parliamentary seats. The party has been in opposition since 2020.

=== Again in opposition (from 2020) ===
After the elections, Ramūnas Karbauskis resigned from his parliamentary seat. After the electoral loss the party (along with the Labour Party) began to support various radical movements on the political fringes (e. g. Families' Defense March and the Lithuanian Family Movement). This position caused disagreements within party and its parliamentary group.

Disagreements had forced a split in the parliamentary group in late summer and early autumn of 2021, and former Prime Minister Saulius Skvernelis formed the newly established Union of Democrats "For Lithuania" (although this split was speculated by the pundits as early as March 2021). Due to this and the Social Democratic Party's position not to support the opposition coalition, the party lost the position of opposition leader. By the end of 2021, the party started losing members in municipalities' districts (e. g. Lazdijai district municipality mayor Ausma Miškinienė left it along with the almost all LVŽS members in the area).

Aurelijus Veryga, Minister of Health in Skvernelis' cabinet, was put forward as the party's candidate in the 2024 presidential election. In his electoral program, Veryga emphasized his support for traditional values and opposition to same-sex partnerships.

The party participated in the 2024 European Parliament election in Lithuania and aimed to win 3 seats in the European Parliament, up from 2 that it won in the 2019 European Parliament election in Lithuania. It toned down its populist and socially conservative stances and reoriented itself closer to environmentalism and green politics. However, the party won 9.13% of the popular vote (down from 12.56% in 2019) and only won a single seat.

In the 2024 Lithuanian parliamentary election, the party ran as a joint list with several politicians from the parties Young Lithuania and Lithuania – For Everyone. It caused the Central Election Commission to designate 7 per cent threshold for this party to obtain seats in multi-member constituency. LVŽS passed electoral threshold with just more than 250 votes. After the election joined the agreement with LSDP to form a government on 15 October. In the end, Dawn of Nemunas was chosen a third party of coalition, thus leaving LVŽS in opposition.

After being excluded from the government, LVŽS has formed an electoral group together with its long-standing ally, the Electoral Action of Poles in Lithuania – Christian Families Alliance. In November, Karbauskis addressed his party, expressing his regret of cooperation with conservative politicians such as Ignas Vėgėlė in the 2024 election, and announcing early leadership election in the LVŽS that would take place in early 2025, despite Karbauskis' term expiring in December 2025. Karbauskis stated that he is ready to either continue leading the party, or "to step down honourably if most of the union members choose another leader". In January 2025, the party announced that its convention and early leadership election would take place on 1 March. Aurelijus Veryga (member of European Parliament) won the leadership election.

=== Coalition government (since 2025) ===
In August 2025, the LSDP expelled the Union of Democrats "For Lithuania" (DSVL) from the coalition and invited LVŽS and the Electoral Action of Poles in Lithuania – Christian Families Alliance (AWPL–ZChR) to replace it. On 25 September 2025, the new government composed of LSDP, PPNA, Fand AWPL–ZChR was sworn in, bringing LVŽS back to power. On 6 June 2026, the government was swapped again, as LSDP removed the PPNA from the coalition and invited the DSVL back. On 18 June, a new coalition agreement was signed between the LSDP, DSVL, and LVŽS.

== Ideology ==
Lithuanian Farmers and Greens Union is placed on the left of Lithuanian political spectrum, although with strong populist and socially conservative tendencies. The party is described as green conservative, agrarian and social conservative and is considered to be a blend of staunchly left-wing economic policy, environmentalism, and a conservative outlook on some sociocultural issues. Political scientist Ainė Ramonaitė has also described the party as "right-wing on the moral dimension and left-wing on the economic dimension", together with the Electoral Action of Poles in Lithuania – Christian Families Alliance. Political scientist Agnieszka Kwiatkowska wrote that the party "combined the hard left promise of radical change on socioeconomic issues and the far right conservative approach to identity politics, human rights, minority rights, gender equality, and refugees". Economically, the party focuses on the importance of expanded healthcare and social welfare, whereas socially the party campaigns on traditional and Christian values and the need to stop the moral decay of contemporary society. Its economic ideology has been described as social-democratic, or akin to social democracy. The party is also described as technocratic and agrarian populist.

The rhetoric of the party is based on left-wing populism, prioritizing socioeconomic issues and establishing itself as the representative of the disadvantaged groups of Lithuanian society. Its voter base is composed of rural areas and small towns, and its supporters are mainly the poor, disadvantaged and anti-establishment voters. It criticizes other partes for neglecting the needs of the poor. The LVŽS is not a protest party however - it actively works with other parties and form cabinets. The party appeals to traditional left-wing electorate by stressing the need to reduce social inequality, invest in impoverished areas, and increase minimum wage. It strongly supports trade unions and promotes a union-favourable labor law, demands progressive taxation, and redistribution of wealth from "business interests" to "the people". The party campaigns on opposition to neoliberal policies, accusing other parties of "out-liberalizing" each other in pursuit of "avant-garde neoliberal policy ideas" at the expense of vulnerable socioeconomic groups.

The main focus of the party is "social solidarity and left-wing ideas". It criticizes right-leaning parties for anti-Russian sentiment as well as following the traditional division into "ex-communists and anti-communists". The LVŽS declares to be neither post-communist nor anti-communist, although its foreign policy aligns with the post-communist view, as the party declared that better relations with Russia are in national interest of Lithuania. Socially, the party makes somewhat conservative appeals, pledging to uphold 'traditional' values, fight against alcohol and for "sober way of living", and protecting Lithuanian language. It is less conservative on some other social matters - it postulates increased psychological services availability, old-age pensions rise, significant climate action via preservation, agricultural reform against large landowners, and environmental education. The party is regarded as moderate in its social conservatism.

=== Origins ===
Throughout its existence, the party has evolved from a purely agrarian party to a left-wing populist one, full of eclectic tendencies. Starting out as the farmer-focused Lithuanian Peasant Union (Lithuanian: Lietuvos Valstiečių Sąjunga) in the early 1990s, LVŽS was later renamed the Lithuanian Peasant Party (Lithuanian: Lietuvos valstiečių partija) and started broadening its program beyond agricultural issues, joining forces with the Lithuanian Women Party (Lithuanian: Lietuvos moterų partija) in 1995. In the early 2000s, the Lithuanian Peasant Party was becoming increasingly left-wing, leading to the change of its name to the Lithuanian Peasant People’s Party (Lithuanian: Lietuvos valstiečių liaudininkų partija) in 2005, which was to highlight both the leftwards turn of the party and to connect itself to the interwar peasant movements in Lithuania.

In 2012, the party was renamed again to the Lithuanian Union of Peasants and Greens, after its leader Ramūnas Karbauskis steered the party towards green politics, strongly promoting renewable energy and campaigning against nuclear power plants. This led the party to combine both agricultural interests and elements of green politics, which at the time was condemned as a 'somewhat schizophrenic' political mix. At the same time, led by Karbauskis, it initiated the 2014 Lithuanian constitutional referendum, which sought to prohibit the ownership of land in Lithuania to foreign citizens, in violation of Lithuania's terms of membership in the European Union. Karbauskis opposed Lithuania's accession to the European Union before 2004, although the party emphasized its pro-Europeanism during the 2016 campaign. Between 2012 and 2016, the party also adopted right-wing views on social issues. In the 2016 Lithuanian parliamentary election, the main message of LVŽS was the need to fight poverty and social exclusion, for which the party blamed economic liberalism and pro-business policies by previous Lithuanian governments.

=== Economic issues ===
Economically, the party is described as 'extreme-left' and strongly populist, presenting itself as a party of ordinary people. It is described as social democratic economically. LVŽS argues that wealth inequality is one of Lithuania's key problems, contrasting the prosperity of Vilnius and the urban middle class with the impoverished Lithuanian countryside, struggling with high unemployment and lack of prospects. In its ideological manifesto "The Government Program for Sustainable Lithuania" (Lithuanian: Darnios Lietuvos Vyriausybės programa), LVŽS declared: "Addressing regional poverty and exclusion must become a priority task for the new government. Recognising that the economic cause of high unemployment and emigration is relatively low wages, we will take swift and effective measures to increase the income of the population, while at the same time striving to ensure an adequate social safety net." Accentuating the agrarianism of the party, the program also put heavy importance on "preserving the vitality of the Lithuanian countryside".

LVŽS defines an economy that would prioritize the 'common man' as its goal, emphasizing the need to implement worker-friendly reforms in healthcare and education, a significant increase in wages and pensions, and the drastic revision of Lithuania's labour code, which the party has denounced as pro-business. The party has pledged to create a state-owned pharmacy network and sharply reduce drug prices, and initiated an anti-alcohol campaign, which it implemented by increasing excise duty on alcohol, raising minimum drinking age to 20, introducing a total ban on alcohol advertising and establishing a state monopoly on alcohol trade. The party is also strongly pro-union, and was praised for improving social dialogue between the state and the unions, and implementing a number of union-favourable collective agreements in the public sector. It also promotes public awareness and the visibility of trade unions, and encourages workers to join them. The party also postulated a ban on land sales to foreigners.

One of the party's main economic goals is to replace the privatization of retirement saving accounts and other welfare programs. After 1991, Lithuania "zealously embraced neoliberal doctrines" and became characterized by one of the lowest levels of social expenditure and the highest levels of poverty and inequality among EU Member States; the pensioners were amongst the poorest voting constituencies of Lithuania. LVŽS appealed to the impoverished pensioners for political support and pledged to restructure and nationalize the "second pillar" pension program. The party's plan "mobilized a number of powerful and vocal constituencies such as the banking, life insurance, private pension fund industries, as well as business lobbying groups that had high stakes in pension reform."

=== Social issues ===
The party's program emphasises a commitment to establishing a "strong family" as the core of Lithuanian society. It also strongly praises the Catholic Church and its teachings, and opposes abortion, same-sex partnerships and assisted reproductive technologies on the basis of the Catholic faith. Despite this, in the twelfth Seimas, the LVŽS was a big tent in regards to social issues, and some of its members such as Dovilė Šakalienė and Tomas Tomilinas were strong supporters of feminism, minority rights and civil partnerships for same-sex couples. Since the 2020 election, the party has increasingly turned socially conservative, especially after its more liberal members of the Seimas joined the Union of Democrats "For Lithuania". The party's vice-chairman Tomas Tomilinas was expelled from the party in 2021 for voting in favor of same-sex partnerships.

The party declared itself to be "the only group that will consistently represent traditional values and the policy of traditional family", and denounced gender ideology, denouncing it for failing to "recognize the human sex as a human nature". The LVŽS also opposes immigration, postulating the need to protect Lithuania from influx of refugees and proposing to elevate a physical barrier on Lithuanian borders. Given the social conservatism of the LVŽS and its emphasis on Christian values, traditional family and preservation of national identity, its rule was compared to that of Polish Law and Justice or Hungarian Fidesz. However, unlike these parties, LVŽS did not mark a break with the liberal course of the European Union. Ukrainian political scientist Nataliya Khoma argues that the social conservatism of the party is moderate, stating that LVŽS "bypassed the issue of sexual minority rights" and despite promoting conservative values, the party did not adopt "a radical platform that exacerbates this issue".

=== Electoral campaigns ===
LVŽS's success in the 2016 parliamentary election has been compared to the victory of Donald Trump in the 2016 United States presidential election. According to Virgis Valentinavičius, both Trump and Karbauskis constructed a narrative of 'us against them', opposing themselves against the elite, in spite of both being among the wealthiest people in their respective countries, and both also shifted the blame for their early scandals to the media and the conspiracy of the establishment.

In December 2023, the party took part in a meeting called "The family of European Conservatives is expanding" organized by the European Conservatives and Reformists.

In the 2024 European Parliament election in Lithuania, the party focused on the environmental issues and promoted green politics, and toned down its socially conservative policies. After the election, however, it joined the right-wing and Eurosceptic ECR Party.

== Election results ==
=== Seimas ===
Election	Leader	Votes (Note: Proportional representation votes.)	%	Seats	+/–	Government
2004	Kazimira Prunskienė	78,902	6.60 (#6)	10 / 141	New	Coalition
2008	Kazimira Prunskienė	46,162	3.73 (#9)	3 / 141	▼7	Opposition
2012	Ramūnas Karbauskis	53,141	4.05 (#8)	1 / 141	▼2	Opposition
2016	Ramūnas Karbauskis	274,108	22.45 (#1)	54 / 141	▲53	Coalition
2020	Ramūnas Karbauskis	204,780	18.07 (#2)	32 / 141	▼22	Opposition
2024	Ramūnas Karbauskis	87,374	7.16 (#6)	8 / 141	▼24	Opposition (2024–2025)
2024	Ramūnas Karbauskis	87,374	7.16 (#6)	8 / 141	▼24	Coalition (2025–2026)
2024	Ramūnas Karbauskis	87,374	7.16 (#6)	8 / 141	▼24	Coalition (2026–present)

=== European Parliament ===
Election	List leader	Votes	%	Seats	+/–	EP Group
2004	Kazimira Prunskienė	89,338	7.41 (#5)	1 / 13	New	UEN
2009	Gintaras Didžiokas	10,285	1.87 (#11)	0 / 12	▼1	–
2014	Ramūnas Karbauskis	75,643	6.61 (#7)	1 / 11	▲1	Greens/EFA
2019	Bronis Ropė	157,604	12.56 (#3)	2 / 11	▲1	Greens/EFA
2024	Aurelijus Veryga	61,880	9.13 (#3)	1 / 11	▼1	ECR

== Current Members of the Seimas ==
Parliamentarian	From	Constituency
Valius Ąžuolas	2016	Multi-member Constituency
Ignas Vėgėlė	2024	Multi-member Constituency
Aušrinė Norkienė	2016	Multi-member Constituency
Dainius Gaižauskas	2016	Multi-member Constituency
Bronis Ropė	2024	Multi-member Constituency
Rimas Jonas Jankūnas	2024	Multi-member Constituency
Ligita Girskienė	2020	Marių
Eimantas Kirkutis	2024	Šiauliai district

== Name ==
- 2001 – Dec 2005: Peasants and New Democratic Party Union or Union of Peasants and New Democratic Parties (Valstiečių ir Naujosios demokratijos partijų sąjunga/VNDS)
- Dec 2005 – Jan 2012: Lithuanian Peasant Popular Union (Lietuvos valstiečių liaudininkų sąjunga/LVLS)
- Jan 2012 – Feb 2017: Lithuanian Peasant and Greens Union (Lietuvos valstiečių ir žaliųjų sąjunga/LVŽS)
- Feb 2017 – present: Lithuanian Farmers and Greens Union (Lietuvos valstiečių ir žaliųjų sąjunga/LVŽS)

== See also ==
- Union of Greens and Farmers (Latvia)
