= Andrius Mazuronis =

Lithuanian politician (born 1979)

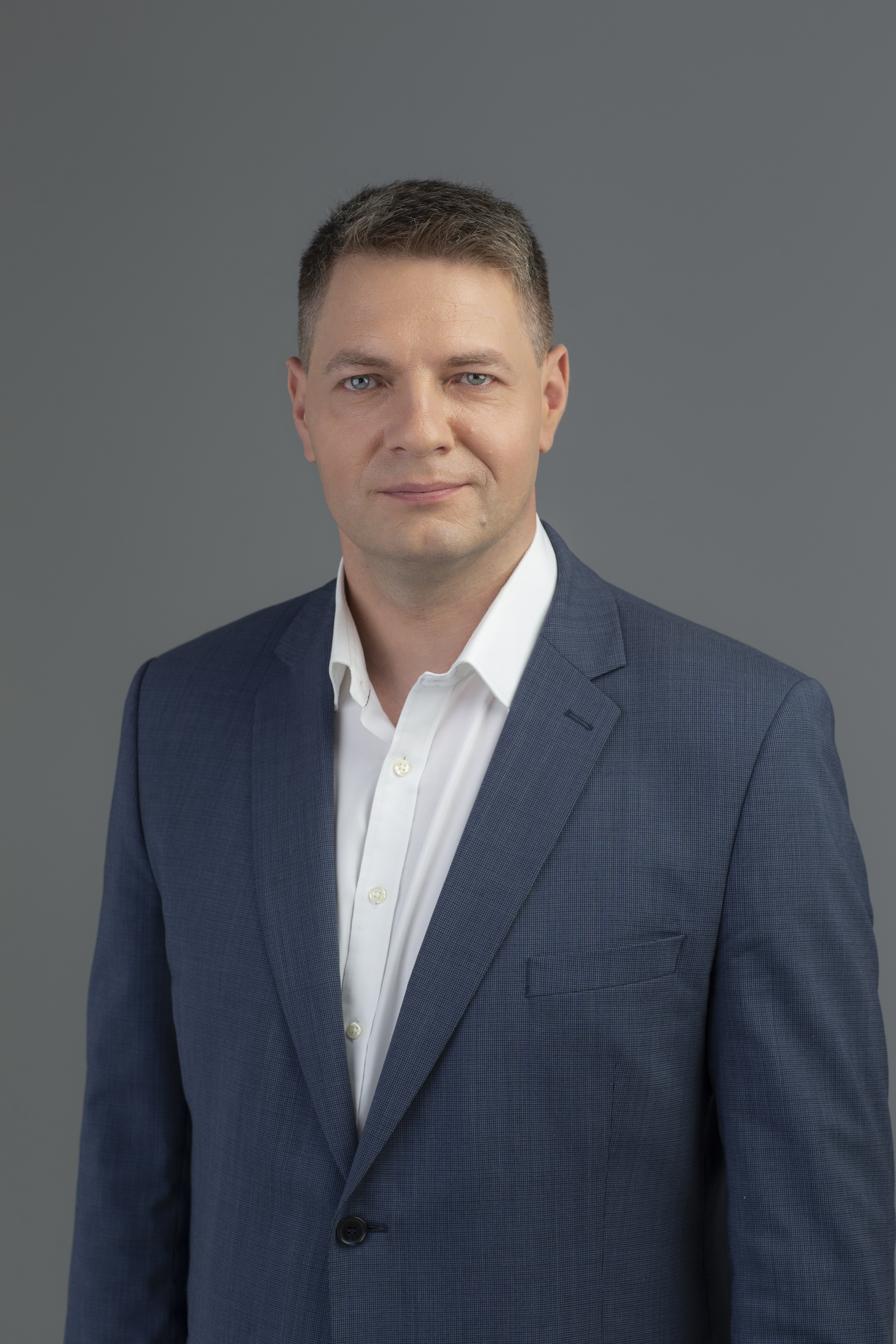
- Mazuronis in 2020

Deputy Speaker of the Seimas
- Incumbent
- Assumed office 13 November 2020

Member of Seimas
- Incumbent
- Assumed office 9 April 2019
- Preceded by: Arūnas Gelūnas
- Constituency: Multi-member
- In office 17 November 2008 – 14 November 2016
- Constituency: Multi-member

Personal details
- Born: 13 July 1979 (age 47) Šiauliai, Lithuania
- Party: Labour Party (2019-2024); Liberal Movement (2015-2019); Order and Justice (2006-2015)
- Spouse: Laura Mazuronienė
- Education: Vilnius Gediminas Technical University

Andrius Mazuronis (born 13 July 1979) is an engineer, politician, a Deputy Speaker of the Seimas and Member of the Seimas since 2008.

== Biography ==
His father is an architect and a politician Valentinas Mazuronis who served as a member of the EU parliament.

He graduated from high school in Šiauliai. In 1997 he entered Vilnius Gediminas Technical University. In 2003, he completed his master's degree studies and obtained a master's degree in civil engineering. He also obtained the certificates of the special building maintenance manager and the building construction manager of a special building.

From 2003 to 2008 and from 2018 to 2019 worked in the private sector.

== Political life ==
He was Member of the Seimas from 2008 to 2016 and again from 2019. In 2017, he worked as an Accredited Assistant to the then MEP Antanas Guoga.

From 2006 to 2015 Mazuronis belonged to the Order and Justice, was a member of the Liberal Movement from 2015 to 2019. From 2019 he is Member of the Labour Party.

On 13 November 2020 was elected as Deputy Speaker of the Seimas.

== Sources ==
- http://www.vrk.lt/rinkimai/400_lt/KandidatuSarasai/RinkimuOrganizacija3442.html 2008 m. Lietuvos Respublikos Seimo rinkimai – Partija Tvarka ir teisingumas – Iškelti kandidatai
- https://www.lrs.lt/sip/portal.show?p_r=35299&p_k=1&p_a=498&p_asm_id=53932
