= Nida Vasiliauskaitė =

Lithuanian philosopher

- Born: 21 December 1975 (age 50); Vilnius, Lithuanian SSR, USSR
- Occupations: Philosopher; lecturer; columnist; public figure
- Notable work: Rationality and Justice? The Postmodernist Utopia in the Political Philosophy of the Late 20th Century (2020)

Academic background
- Education: Vilnius University
- Thesis: Problem of Rationality in Modern Political Philosophy (2004)
- Influences: John Rawls; Jean-François Lyotard; Jean Baudrillard; Kean Binmore

Academic work
- Discipline: Philosophy
- Institutions: Vilnius University; Vilnius Gediminas Technical University

Nida Vasiliauskaitė (Lithuanian pronunciation: [nɪˈdɐ vɐsɪlʲɐʊsˈkaːɪteː]; born 21 December 1975) is a Lithuanian philosopher and publicist. As of 2020, Vasiliauskaitė began to receive more widespread attention as a public figure for her views on political matters regarding freedom of choice, rising collectivism as well as the evergrowing influence of political correctness in the country's legal and cultural landscape. She positions herself as a conservative liberal and is the founder of a centre-left minor party Second Lithuania.

She has a doctorate of philosophy from Vilnius University Vasiliauskaitė was a member of the New Left 95 movement, the Union of Lithuanian Young Scientists, and the Tolerant Youth Association. From 2005 to 2021, she was a Delfi news portal analyst.

== Political stances ==
=== Criticizing government’s vaccination policies ===
Nida Vasiliauskaitė heavily criticized the position taken by the Lithuanian government over the COVID-19 pandemic and fully supported the right to self-determination when choosing to take the vaccine. During a protest Vasiliauskaitė said: “The right to one’s health, security, life, and death belongs to us, the citizens, the people. Not to the government. We will become ill. And if you’re scaring us that we will die, we will die as free people. We don’t need your protection from ourselves and assistance when dying or being sick.” The philosopher even stated that Lithuania's government is not acting as a democratic institution although they were elected. “I would like to remind you that Hitler also came to power by following all the legal democratic procedures. So what?” The Prime Minister of Lithuania Ingrida Šimonytė have responded to Vasiliauskaitė's remarks on Facebook, saying: “Nor me, nor Arūnas Dulkys cannot appeal to state hospitals with a circular letter making a request to ensure that m’lady and her accomplices, if needed, would not be taken to the “captivity” of oxygen, catheter, and artificial ventilators. Because Constitution, Hippocrates, and reasons.”

a good thing, but as we’re getting more familiar with a rebranded and a surprising new order of the EU, it’s becoming more obvious that it has nothing in common with the promises for which we have originally voted for. We voted on becoming a member of the European Union not because it [the membership] is a universal value per se, but because of its promises, such as the free movement of goods and services, common cultural space, market as well as security were attractive. All of that sounds good and well, but today none of these promises look realistic as there is no movement, no freedom, no envisioned fantasy of Western life, and no democracy. Conversely, the EU is the source from which our Prime Ministers get orders while our national self-dependency is being destroyed,” Vasiliauskaitė explained.[7]
