= Vilnius University Šiauliai Academy =

Public university in Vilnius, Lithuania

Coordinates: 55°55′35″N 23°19′28″E

- Vilniaus universiteto Šiaulių akademija
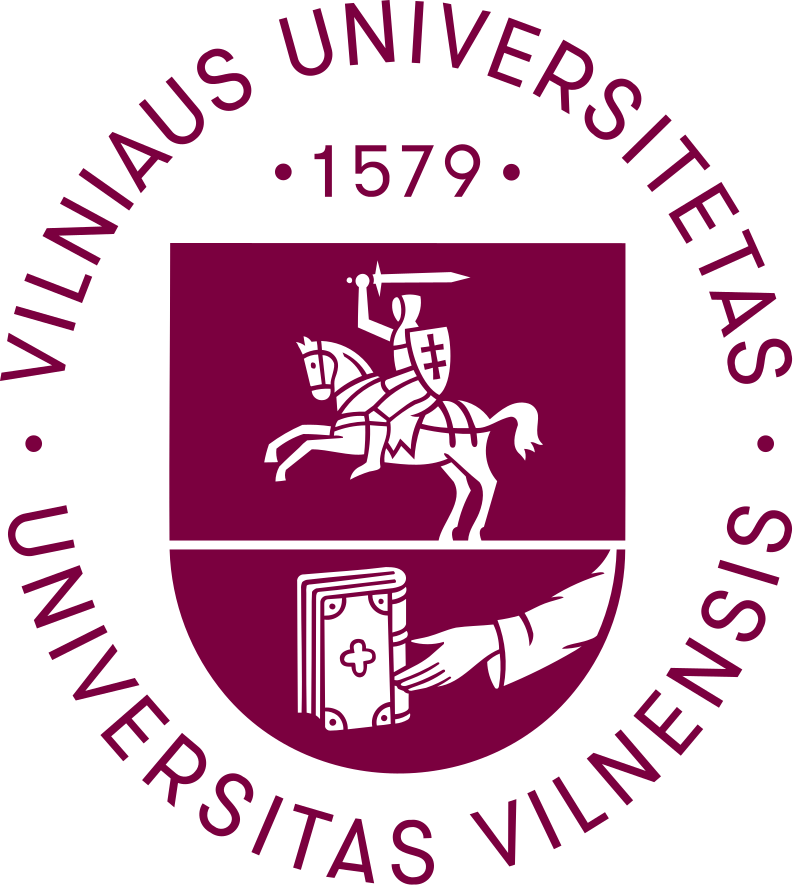
- Type: Public
- Established: 1997 (as Šiauliai University); 2021 (as part of Vilnius University)
- Rector: prof. dr. Renata Bilbokaitė
- Students: 1,450
- Location: Šiauliai, Lithuania
- Campus: Urban
- Website: https://www.sa.vu.lt/en

Vilnius University Šiauliai Academy (Lithuanian: Vilniaus universiteto Šiaulių akademija), established in 1997, is located in Šiauliai, Lithuania. As of 2008, the university was attended by approximately 11,800 students.

== History ==
Šiauliai University was founded by a merger of the Šiauliai Pedagogical Institute and the Šiauliai Polytechnical Faculty of the Kaunas University of Technology. The latter had been a branch of the former Kaunas Polytechnical Institute branch since 1959. On 1st of January 2021, Šiauliai University become a part of Vilnius University and was renamed to Vilnius University Šiauliai Academy.

== Structure ==
The Academy has 3 institutes:

- Institute of Education;
- Institute of Regional Development;
- Lifelong Learning Center.

== Gallery ==
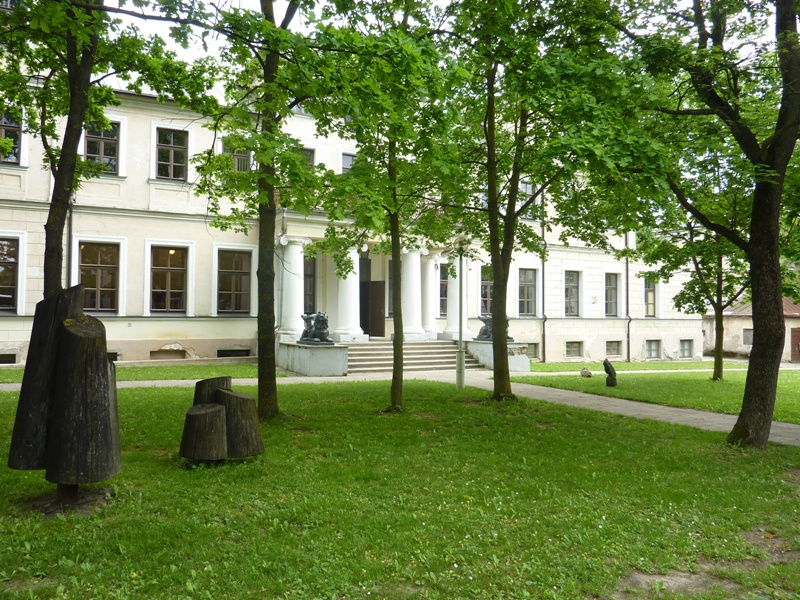
VU Šiauliai Academy II Palace

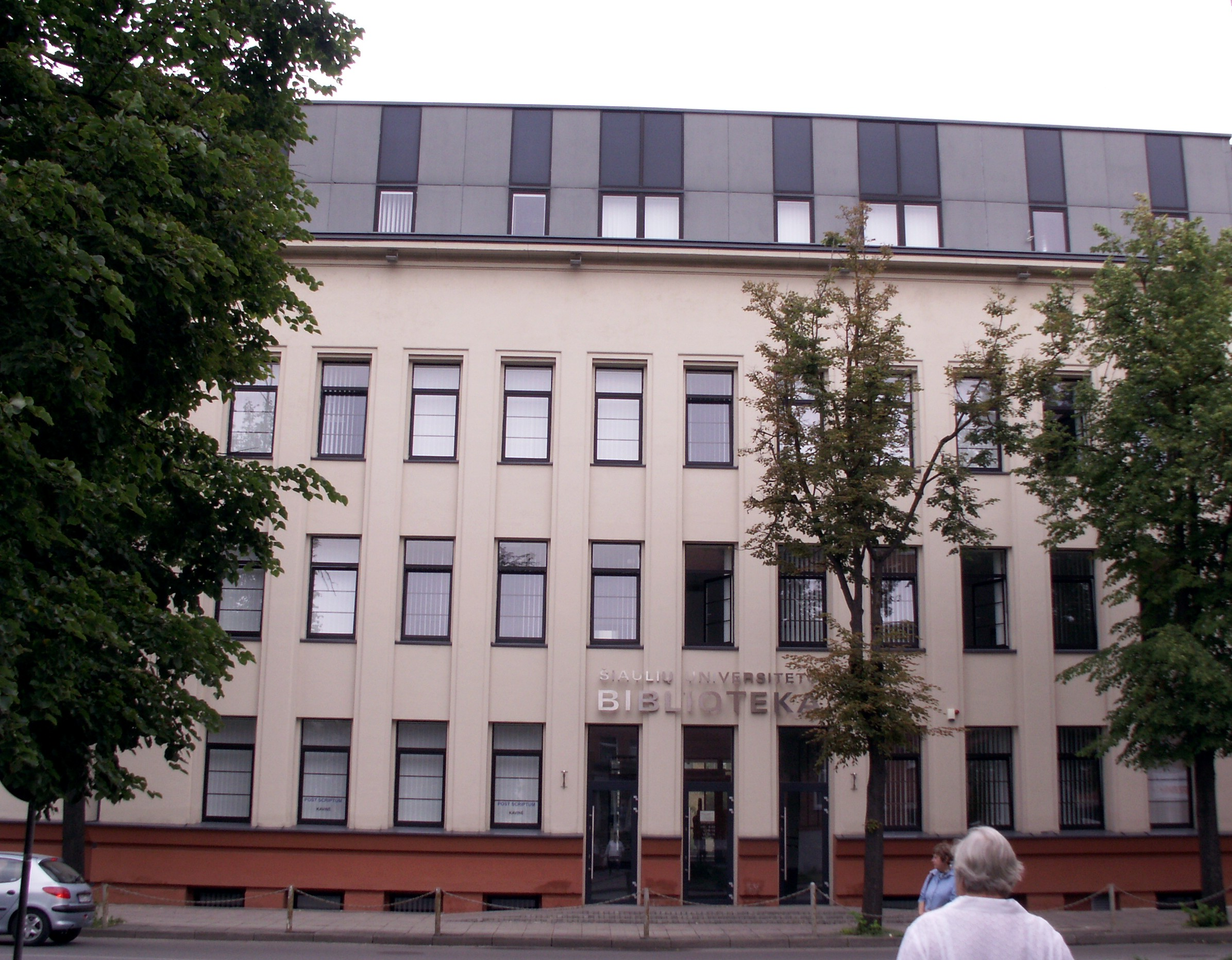
VU Šiauliai Academy Information Centre

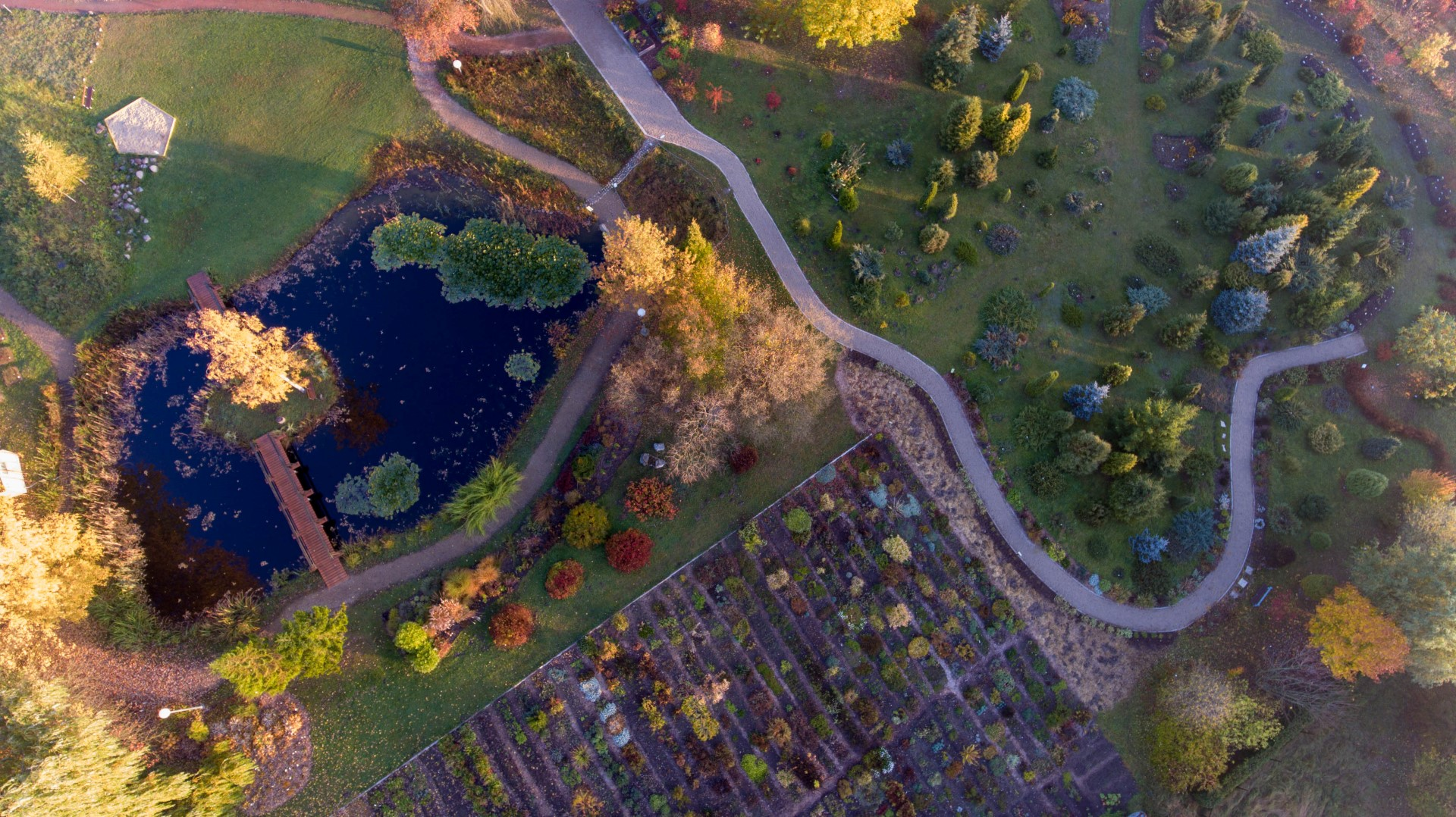
VU Šiauliai Academy Botanical Garden
