= Rolandas Paulauskas =

Lithuanian politician and journalist (born 1954)

Rolandas Paulauskas (b. 6 August 1954 near Kretinga, Lithuania) is a politician, journalist, editor, and signatory of the 1990 Act of the Re-Establishment of the State of Lithuania.

Seimas
New constituency	Member of the Seimas for Šilainiai; 1990-1992	Succeeded by Alfonsas Vaišnoras
