= 1993 Pakaunė mutiny =

| Date | 31 July – 22 September 1993 |
| Location | Riogliškiai, Lithuania 54°57′46″N 23°34′42″E |
| Result | Standoff peacefully resolved |

Belligerents
| Government of Lithuania | Several units of the Lithuanian National Defence Volunteer Forces (SKAT) |

Commanders and leaders
| Audrius Butkevičius | Jonas Maskvytis; Alvydas Pangonis |

Strength
| | About 150 troops (total involved) |
- Location of Riogliškiai within Lithuania

The 1993 Pakaunė mutiny (Lithuanian: Pakaunės savanorių maištas) was a stand-off that occurred in summer 1993 in Lithuania near Kaunas between a group of about 150 men from the Lithuanian National Defence Volunteer Forces (then known as Savanoriškoji krašto apsaugos tarnyba or SKAT) and the Lithuanian government. There was mutual distrust between SKAT and the newly elected leftist Democratic Labour Party of Lithuania (LDDP). Several SKAT members (usually referred to as volunteers) abandoned their posts, took their arms, and retreated to a wooded area near Kaunas in July and August 1993. The crisis escalated when the government issued an order for the volunteers to secure their weapons at designated locations in September. Interpreting the order as confiscation of their weapons, a total of about 150 armed men gathered near Riogliškiai. They expressed their mistrust and dissatisfaction with the new LDDP government and raised social and political demands. After a week long negotiations, the men agreed to return to their posts if no one would be persecuted for their role in the mutiny.

Although it concluded peacefully, the stand-off is one of the most controversial and little understood episodes in the early years of post-Soviet Lithuania. Sociologist Zenonas Norkus evaluated the events as a "stress test" of the Lithuanian democracy and the new relationship between the anti-communist and ex-communist elites. The anti-communists, which were now in opposition, did not use the opportunity to return to power. The stand-off was followed by two related and unsolved bombings of the Bražuolė railway bridge in November 1994 (no casualties) and of a passenger car in January 1997 (SKAT officer Juras Abromavičius was killed). The events remain controversial and subject to numerous theories and conspiracies. The political right accuses Russian secret services, while the political left points to the conservatives.

== Background ==
Lithuania restored its independence from the Soviet Union on 11 March 1990. At that time, the Soviet Red Army was in full control of Lithuania and Lithuanians started organizing informal paramilitary volunteer groups to protect and defend the new government. The Soviet Union responded to the declaration of independence by imposing an economic blockade and later by using military force in the events of January 1991. The volunteers as well as unarmed civilians played an important role in defending institutions of the Lithuanian government. The Lithuanian National Defence Volunteer Forces (SKAT) was officially established on 17 January 1991, a few days after the January events.

In October–November 1992, the Democratic Labour Party of Lithuania (LDDP), the former Communist Party of Lithuania, won a majority in the country's first post-independence elections. At the time, Lithuania's regular military was still very weak and Russian troops were still stationed in the country. The volunteers were seen as disloyal to the new leftist government. One of the versions of the events blames LDDP and its policies – distrusting SKAT, the new government reduced its funding, did not provide uniforms, ordered to surrender weapons (many of which were purchased by the volunteers from personal funds), etc. thus provoking the volunteers into action.

== Mutiny ==
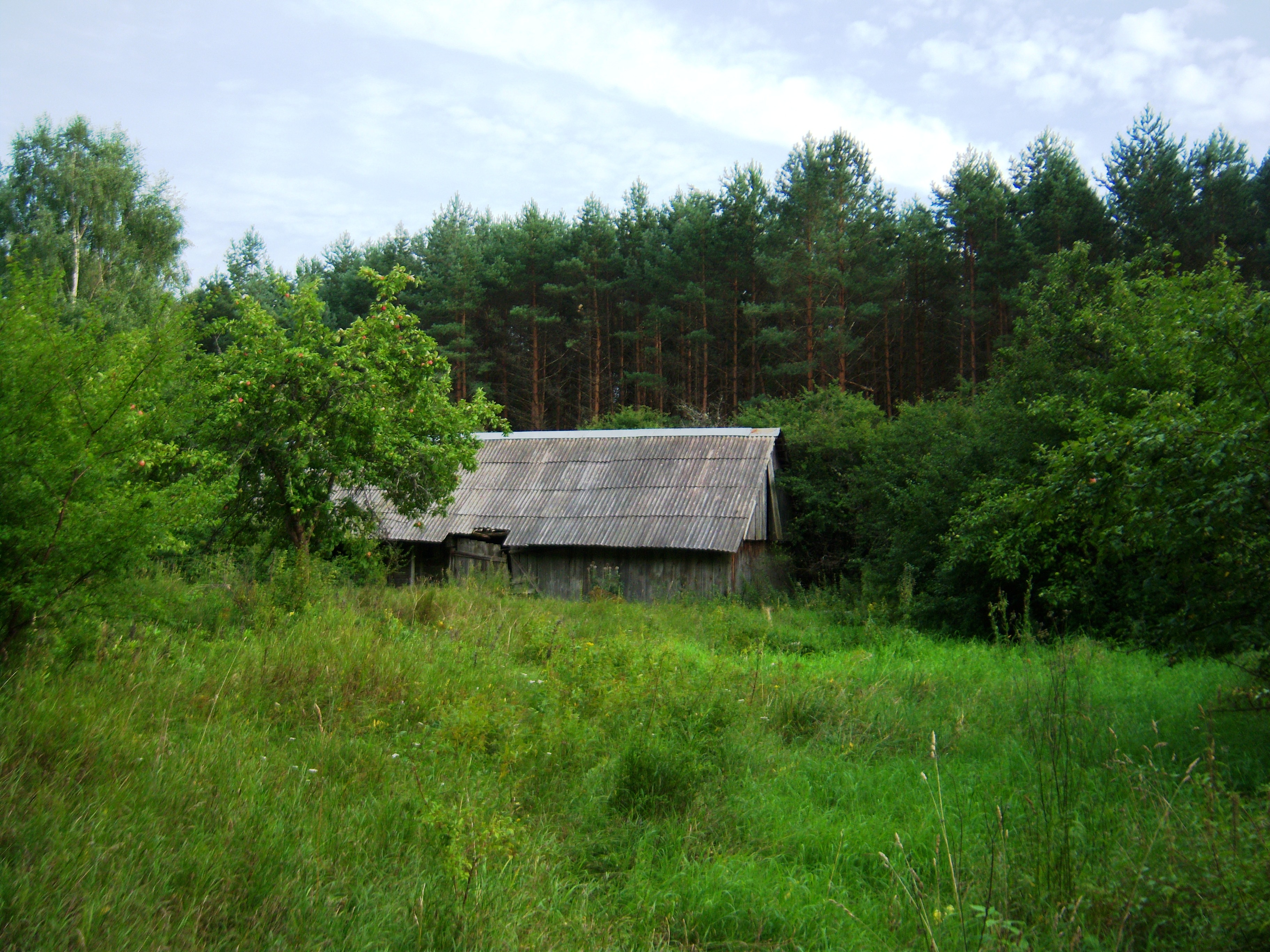
Remnants of the homestead that housed the volunteers

On 31 July 1993, SKAT officer Jonas Maskvytis gathered his weapons that he had personally purchased from the retreating Russian Army and left Kaunas to nearby forests. He later explained that he was helping an acquaintance who was defrauded by a group of criminals who trafficked in counterfeit Deutsche Marks. Maskvytis fired at a car with the criminals and corrupt police officers. Upon learning that he would likely be arrested and that he was dismissed by the Minister of National Defence Audrius Butkevičius, Maskvytis decided not to give in and retreat to the forests. He was accompanied by three men and soon joined by others. They took over a homestead of professor Liudvikas Lašas in Riogliškiai.

The crisis escalated after the government issued an order to collect weapons from SKAT units on 14 September. Because Minister Butkevičius was away in Turkey, the order was signed by his deputy Gediminas Pulokas. While the Russian Army was present in Lithuania, the volunteers kept their weapons so that they could respond almost instantly to a threat. When the last convoy of the Russian troops left Lithuania on 31 August, the government ordered the weapons secured and kept in depots. The volunteers protested taking of their weapons and Maskvytis was joined by company commander Alvydas Pangonis and his men on 16 September. The men, now numbering about 150, expressed their dissatisfaction with the new LDDP government and President Algirdas Brazauskas and raised social and political demands. The men also claimed to have the support of the Lithuanian Armed Forces. In 2007, Brazauskas publicly claimed that the volunteers planned his assassination and wrote in his memoirs that some of the demands were typed on Seimas computers and sent via Seimas fax machines. The government first responded on 17 September with an order from the Armed Forces Staff to surrender the weapons or face consequences for anti-government actions.

The mutiny took place during the withdrawal of Russian troops from Lithuania and the visit of Pope John Paul II on 4–8 September (one of the volunteers fired in the air during the pope's public appearance in Kaunas). Comparisons were also drawn with the unsuccessful attempt to disarm mutinous paramilitary forces by President Abulfaz Elchibey of Azerbaijan in June 1993. The government decided to seek a peaceful resolution and negotiated with the volunteers. The agreement was reached on 22 September when a special parliamentary commission led by Nikolajus Medvedevas visited the camp and promised not to prosecute any of the volunteers for their role in the mutiny. The government reserved the right to prosecute volunteers who had otherwise committed criminal acts.

When the volunteers returned to Kaunas, they captured the SKAT headquarters in Kaunas and disarmed commander Juras Abromavičius, who retreated to the Seventh Fort of Kaunas Fortress. Abromavičius then alerted his superiors, newly appointed SKAT commander Arvydas Pocius, via the M-1 radio station and Lithuanian National Radio and Television, but reportedly was ordered not to escalate the situation. The men were found in violation of the SKAT statute and faced disciplinary actions, including removal from offices and reshuffling of SKAT leadership. Minister of Defense Butkevičius resigned and was replaced by Linas Antanas Linkevičius on 22 October 1993 (with the effective date of 28 October).

== Legal proceedings ==
On 30 October 1993, the volunteers shot and killed a 16-year old Žaneta Sadauskaitė who lived nearby and became friendly with the men. There is no definite version of her death, but likely she was shot in the forehead by accident (one version claims that the men put a tin on her head and used it as a target practice). Haroldas "Haris" Valaitis confessed to the murder, but was acquitted of the murder charges as the judge believed he confessed to protect others because he had a history of mental illness and likely would not serve time in jail as he most likely would be transferred to a psychiatric hospital. No others were charged in Sadauskaitė's death.

Maskvytis and another officer were tried for their pre-mutiny activities (taking actions that exceeded their official duties) and received a two-year suspended sentence in December 1994. In October 2000, Maskvytis was sentenced to four years in prison for the possession and trafficking of illegal weapons, explosive materials, and ammunition. During the search of Maskvytis' home, the police found seven grenades, AK-47, Luger pistol, hunting rifle IZH, etc.

== Related incidents ==
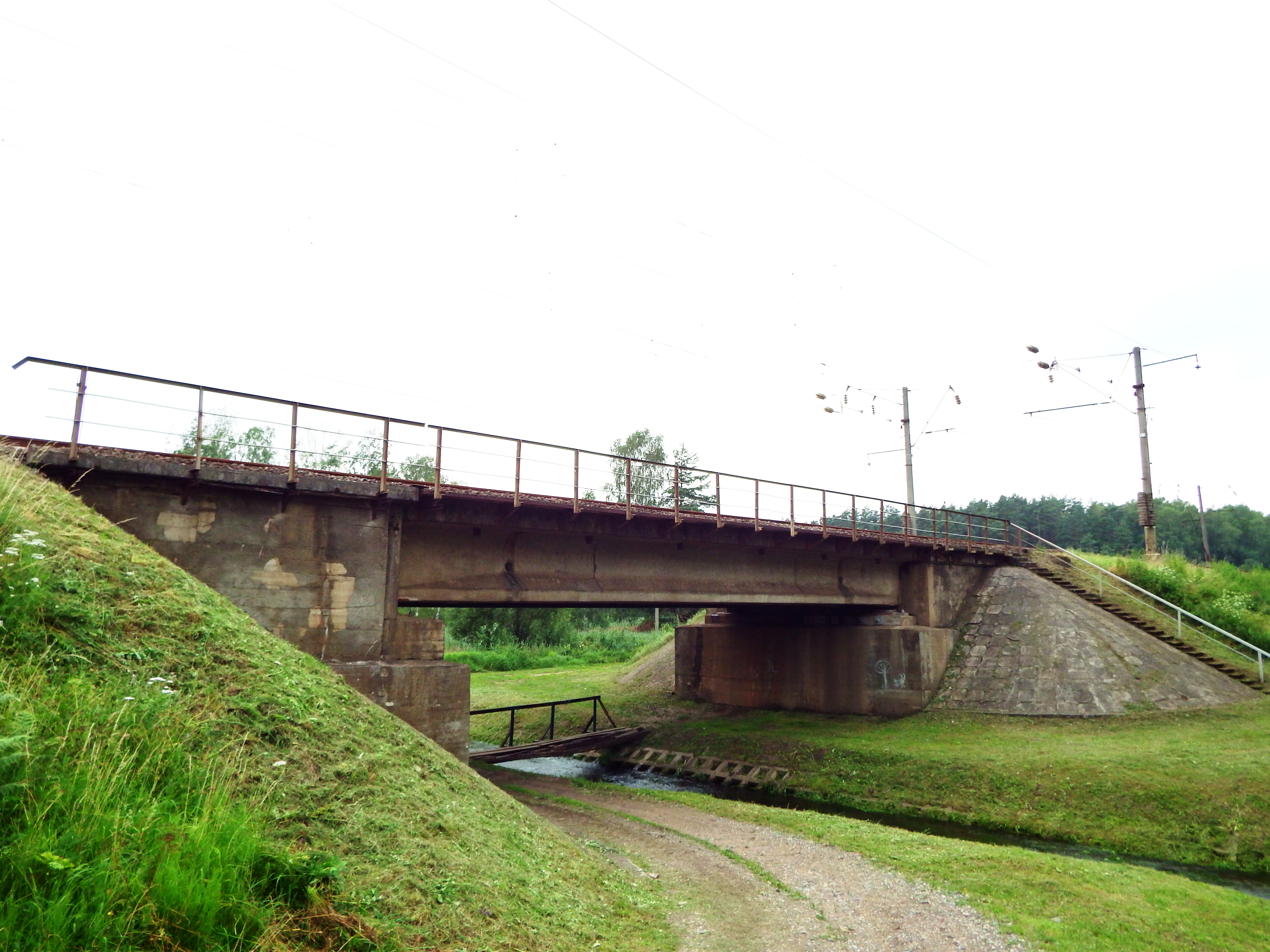
Bražuolė railway bridge which was bombed in November 1994

The mutiny was followed by several controversial high-profile crimes that remain unsolved. On 6 November 1994, the Bražuolė bridge bombing damaged a bridge over the Bražuolė River on the Vilnius–Kaunas Railway, but train derailment and casualties were avoided due to lucky coincidence. The prosecutor's office investigated 12 different scenarios for the explosion but stopped the pre-trial investigation in 2012 due to the expired statute of limitations. A report of the investigation published in 2015 claimed that the bombing was related to an attempt to disrupt Russian military transport to the Kaliningrad Oblast and send a message of support to Chechnya in its armed struggle for independence from Russia.

Juras Abromavičius, officer of SKAT and State Security Department of Lithuania (VSD), who was investigating the mutiny of 1993 and explosion of 1994 was assassinated on 31 January 1997 when a homemade RDX bomb detonated under his car. In 2006, the prosecutor's office announced that it closed Abromavičius's case. They managed to identify Vladas Grybauskas as the bomb maker but he committed suicide on 10 December 1997. The statute of limitations for the murder of Abromavičius expired in 2017.

These cases were followed by a string of deaths ruled as suicides: volunteers Remigijus Kuršas fell from a third floor, Irmantas Ruplys, Edmundas Simanavičius, and Remigijus Kazokaitis shot themselves. Kornelijus Rudauskas drowned in summer 1997.

== Responsibility ==
There are many theories and conspiracies surrounding the events. Already during the crisis, politicians expressed views that it was not an action of a few disgruntled officers, but a premeditated political provocation. In general, the two most popular versions blame either the Russian Federal Security Service or Lithuanian ultra-conservatives.

For example, former Prime Minister Gediminas Kirkilas once said that the mutiny was useful to Russia as it could demonstrate that as soon as the Russian Army left Lithuania, the country experienced internal unrest. During an interview on 20 September 1993, Vytautas Landsbergis, leader of the conservative Homeland Union, expressed fears that the incident could be used as a pretext for the Russian Army to return but at the same time defended SKAT as a necessary institution for the national defense.

The political left accuse the conservatives, primarily the Homeland Union. A parliamentary commission set up in 2007 to investigate Abromavičius' murder concluded that the murder was carried out by a terrorist-like group that maintained contacts with current and former leaders of the Homeland Union, Lithuanian Christian Democratic Party, and Lithuanian Democratic Party. In 2018, Audrius Butkevičius and Zigmas Vaišvila publicly and explicitly accused Landsbergis of sponsoring terrorist activities related to the mutiny and the two bombings.

== See also ==
- Pullapää crisis – similar 1993 crisis in Estonia
