= Bražuolė bridge bombing =

1994 bridge bombing in Lithuania

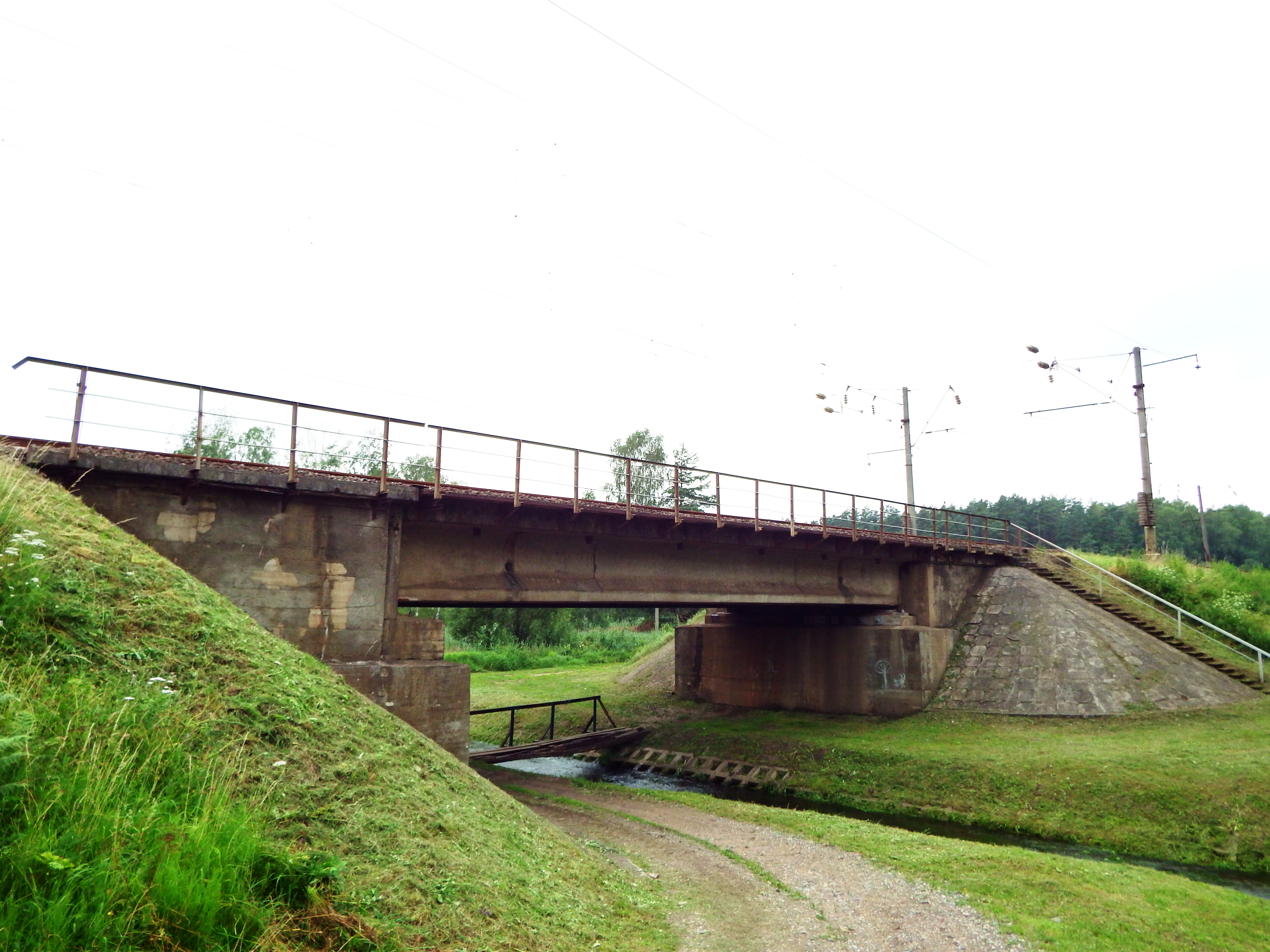
- Bražuolė bridge in 2014

- Bražuolė bridge bombing (Lithuania)
- Location: 54°45′45″N 24°52′34″E; Bražuolė bridge near Vievis, Lithuania
- Date: 6 November 1994
- Target: Railway bridge
- Attack type: Bombing
- Deaths: None
- Perpetrator: Unknown

Bražuolė bridge bombing was an explosion under a railway bridge at around 7 a.m. on 6 November 1994 over the Bražuolė River on the Vilnius–Kaunas Railway near Vievis, Lithuania. While the bridge was heavily damaged, train derailment was avoided due to lucky coincidence. Two passenger trains were scheduled to cross the bridge soon after the explosion. One, warned by a local resident, slowed and managed to cross the bridge on the side that suffered little damage. It then alerted the oncoming train which stopped in time.

It is believed that the bombing is connected to the Pakaunė mutiny in September 1993 when about 150 armed men from the Lithuanian National Defence Volunteer Forces (then known as Savanoriškoji krašto apsaugos tarnyba or SKAT) left their posts and presented political demands as well as to the murder of SKAT officer Juras Abromavičius who was investigating the mutiny and the bombing in January 1997. None of the three incidents have been solved and no one has been charged.

== Incident ==
Aldona Juozapavičienė, a local elderly woman, heard the explosion and organized her grandson and two neighbors to help warn and stop the oncoming passenger trains from both directions. In a later press interview, she cited her World War II memories of bombings that helped her quickly realize that the bridge had been bombed. The train no. 79 from Saint Petersburg to Kaliningrad saw the warnings, slowed down, but was unable to stop in time. Nevertheless, it managed to successfully cross the bridge – that side suffered very little damage. The train then radioed about the damage to the bridge to Vievis. Passenger train no. 664 from Klaipėda to Vilnius stopped a few hundred meters before the bridge. Due to a lucky coincidence, both trains were about two minutes behind the schedule – they often bypassed each other on the bridge. The train from Saint Petersburg had about 600 passengers, while the train from Klaipėda carried about 260 people. For their efforts in alerting and stopping the trains, the four local residents were awarded the Life Saving Cross by President Algirdas Brazauskas on 9 November 1994 (decree 423). The bridge was repaired and railway traffic restored in about three weeks.

== Investigation ==
The prosecutor's office investigated 12 different scenarios for the explosion, but has not presented any official conclusions. The pre-trial investigation was stopped in June 2012 due to the expired statute of limitations. A Lithuanian website published the text of the decision to stop the investigation in 2015. According to the report, the explosive was an improvised explosive device of ammonium nitrate and diesel fuel triggered by an RDX detonator with a timer. The investigation identified two men, both members of the Lithuanian National Defence Volunteer Forces, but was unable to identify six others or determine any wider political connections. One of the men, who testified and cooperated with the investigation, claimed that the bombing was supposed to disrupt Russian military transport with the Kaliningrad Oblast and send a message of support to Chechnya in its armed struggle for independence from Russia.

In the absence of the official conclusions, there are many theories, speculations, and conspiracy theories about the bombing and the related Pakaunė mutiny in September 1993 and murder of SKAT officer Juras Abromavičius in January 1997. The cases and their investigations became highly politicized. Leftists (primarily, the Democratic Labour Party of Lithuania (LDDP)) accuse the conservatives (namely, the Homeland Union), while the conservatives point to Russia and its secret services (GRU).
