= Linas Antanas Linkevičius =

Lithuanian politician (born 1961)

Linas Linkevičius
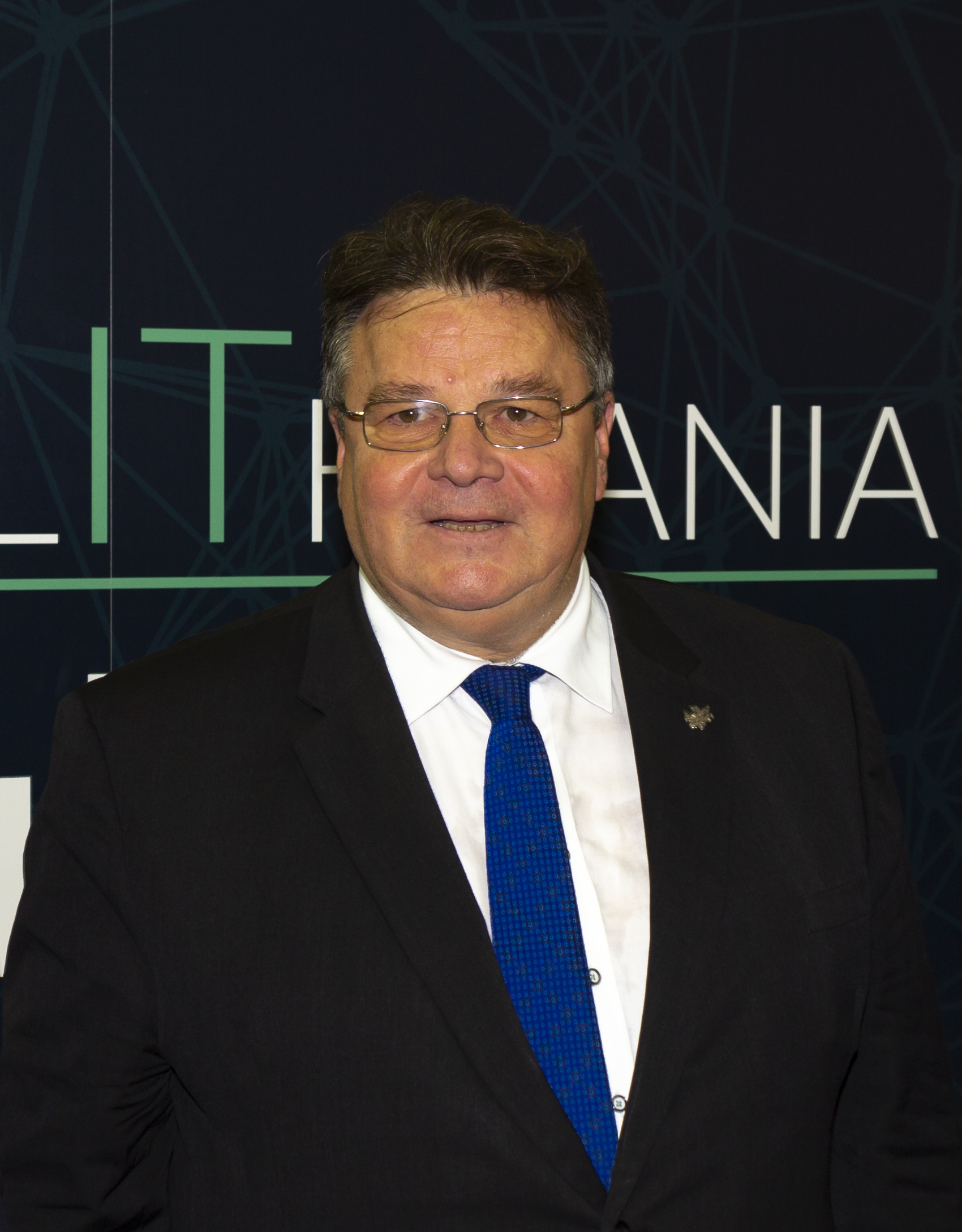
- Linkevičius in 2019

Minister of Foreign Affairs
- In office 13 December 2012 – 11 December 2020
- Prime Minister: Algirdas Butkevičius; Saulius Skvernelis
- Preceded by: Audronius Ažubalis
- Succeeded by: Gabrielius Landsbergis

Minister of National Defence
- In office 26 October 2000 – 14 December 2004
- Prime Minister: Rolandas Paksas; Eugenijus Gentvilas (Acting); Algirdas Brazauskas
- Preceded by: Česlovas Stankevičius
- Succeeded by: Gediminas Kirkilas
- In office 28 October 1993 – 27 November 1996
- Prime Minister: Adolfas Šleževičius; Laurynas Stankevičius
- Preceded by: Audrius Butkevičius
- Succeeded by: Česlovas Stankevičius

Personal details
- Born: 6 January 1961 (age 65) Vilnius, Lithuania
- Party: Democratic Labour Party (1990-2001); Social Democratic Party of Lithuania (2001-2017); Independent (2017-present)
- Education: Kaunas University of Technology

Linas Antanas Linkevičius (born 6 January 1961) is a Lithuanian diplomat who has formerly served in the cabinet as Minister of Foreign Affairs and Minister of National Defence. He is currently Lithuania's Ambassador to Sweden.

== Early life ==
He was born into an engineer and teacher family. His childhood and school years were spent in Kaunas. In 1978, he graduated from the Kaunas 7th Secondary School with a gold medal. From 1978 to 1983, he studied at the Faculty of Automation of Kaunas Polytechnic Institute, graduating with an electrical engineering degree. During the rest of the 80s, he served as secretary of the local Lithuanian Komsomol district in Panemunė.

== Political career ==
Linkevičius served as minister of National Defence from 1993 to 1996 and from 2000 to 2004. He was the Lithuanian Permanent Representative to NATO from 2005 until 2011.

In 2011, he was appointed Ambassador to Belarus.

== Minister of Foreign Affairs, 2012–2020 ==
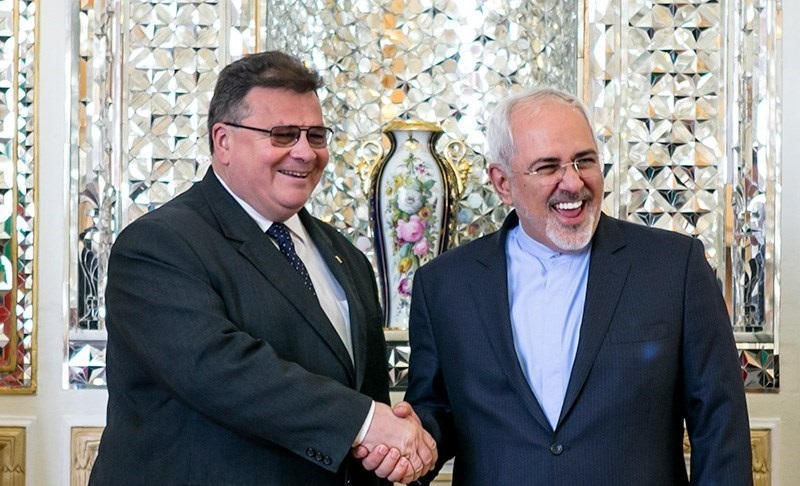
Linkevičius with Iranian Foreign Minister Mohammad Javad Zarif, 28 May 2016

In December 2012 Linkevičius was appointed Minister of Foreign Affairs.

Throughout his term as foreign minister, Linkevičius has corroborated Lithuania's status within many international and multilateral entities and organizations, including the United Nations, NATO and the European Union. He managed to establish strong personal ties with prominent international leaders like Laurent Fabius, Angela Merkel and Shimon Peres, whom he invited to be an advisor to the project of the Jewish Memorial Center in Vilnius, on the site of the Great Synagogue of Vilna.

He is known to be a partisan of international collaboration in fields like science, sport and the arts, in order to strengthen the image of Lithuania and to enhance its global standpoint.

In 2015, Linkevičius visited Saudi Arabia and met with the King Salman of Saudi Arabia. He said back then "I think that after this visit our relations will become much more systematic."

Linkevičius expressed deep concern over the escalation of hostilities in the disputed region of Nagorno-Karabakh and called on Armenia and Azerbaijan to immediately halt fighting and progress towards a peaceful resolution.

On 9 March 2018, after Poland's referral to the European Court of Justice, leaders of Latvia, Lithuania and Estonia expressed their support for Poland over the Article 7 of the Treaty on European Union. On 13 September 2018, Linkevičius has re-confirmed Lithuania's stand: "We will oppose the sanctions against Poland. This dialogue is very complicated but we believe that the result will be positive."

== Ambassador to Sweden, 2024-present ==
On 19 December 2023, President Gitanas Nausėda signed a decree on his appointment as ambassador to Sweden. He took up his duties on January 15.

== Political positions ==
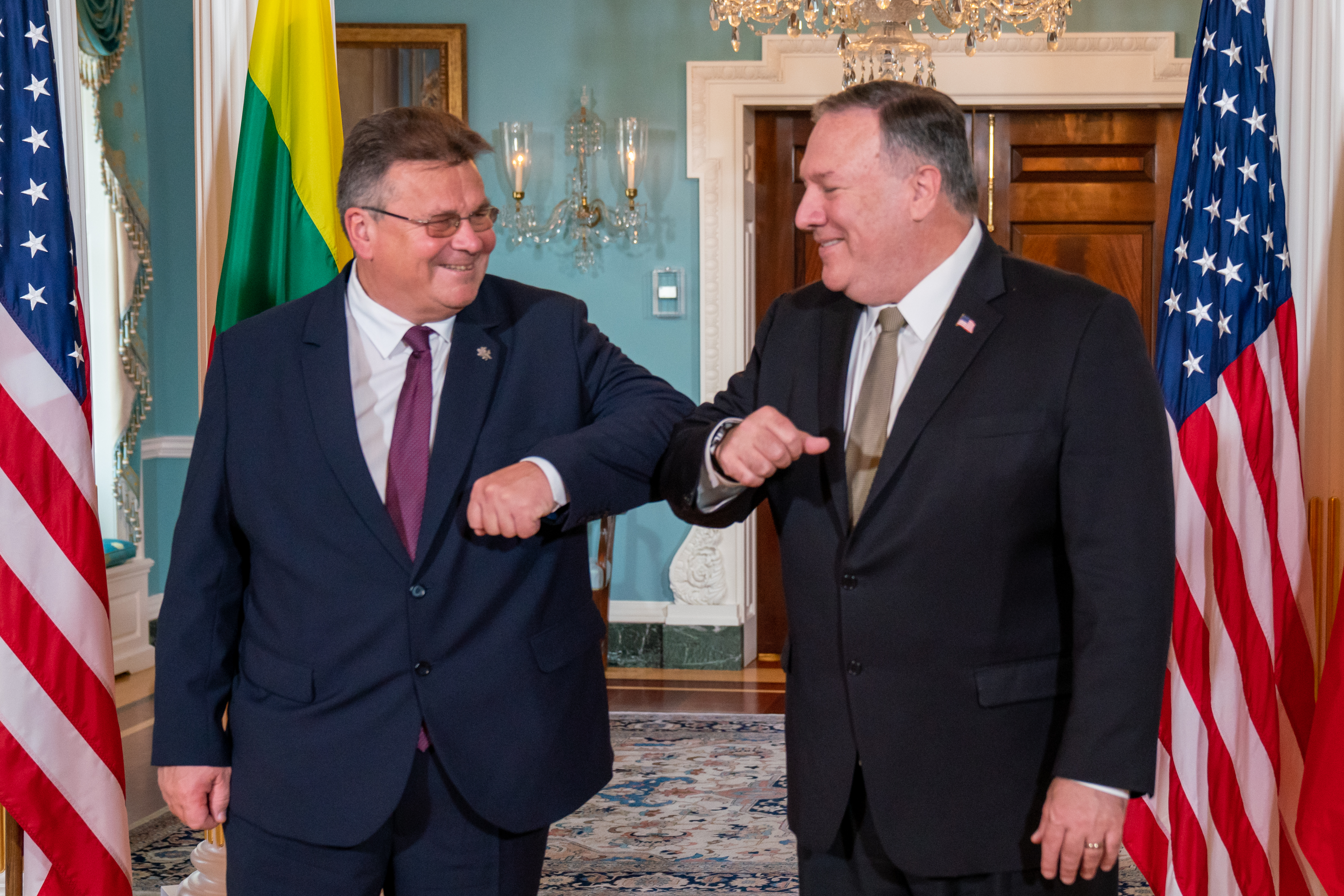
Linkevičius with U.S. Secretary of State Mike Pompeo in 2020

Linkevičius has been a constant opponent within the European Union and NATO of compromises with Russia over Ukraine. When measures to re-engage Russia were discussed in Brussels, in January 2015, he strongly objected. "I do not think we should think how to re-engage; Russia should think how to re-engage . . . I see no reason why we should invent something," he was quoted.

"We can't trust a single word of the Russian leadership. [Russia's] statements are worthless," he was quoted as saying in a public speech in March 2015, scolding some of his European Union colleagues for being detached from "reality" in seeking to soften or unroll some of the sanctions against Russia.

In a newspaper column, in June 2015, Linkevičius warned Lithuania's NATO partners against regression to a mid-Cold War-like détente with Russia, as the one experienced in the late 1960s and throughout the 1970s. Russia, he wrote, no longer poses "a serious alternative to Western liberal democracy", and its adversarial relations with the rest of Europe are "just a Kremlin construct, invented by modern Russia to cover failures of reform."

Referring to Lithuania as a "frontline state" with Russia, he urged in that column that "NATO’s capabilities should be based on sober threat analyses, not illusions. Anything that the Kremlin perceives as weakness will encourage it to press ahead."

== Memberships ==
- Center for European Policy Analysis (CEPA), Member of the International Leadership Council (since 2022)
- European Council on Foreign Relations (ECFR), Member

== Awards ==
- Commander of the Order of the Grand Duke of Lithuania Gediminas (February 3, 2003)
- Commander of the Order of the Cross of Vytis (March 30, 2004)
- Grand Commander's Cross of the Order of Vytautas the Great (2015)
- Order of Three Stars, 3rd class (Latvia, March 12, 2001)
- Order of the Cross of Terra Mariana (Estonia, February 2, 2005)
- Presidential Order of Excellence (Georgia, 2011)
- Order of Honor (Moldova, 2014)
- Grand Cross of the Order of the Polar Star (2015, Sweden)
- Commander of the Order of Merit of the Republic of Poland (2019, Poland)
- Grand Cross of the Order of Merit of the Italian Republic (2019, Italy)
- In March 2021, the Center for Belarusian Solidarity awarded Linkevičius the Global Belarusian Solidarity Award in the category "Melted Ice".

== See also ==
- List of foreign ministers in 2017
- List of current foreign ministers

Political offices
Preceded by Audrius Butkevičius	Minister of National Defence; 1993–1996	Succeeded by Česlovas Stankevičius
Preceded by Česlovas Stankevičius	Minister of National Defence; 2000–2004	Succeeded by Gediminas Kirkilas
Preceded by Audronius Ažubalis	Minister of Foreign Affairs; 2012–2020	Succeeded by Gabrielius Landsbergis
