= Lithuanian Road Museum =

Museum in Vievis, Lithuania

- Kelių muziejus
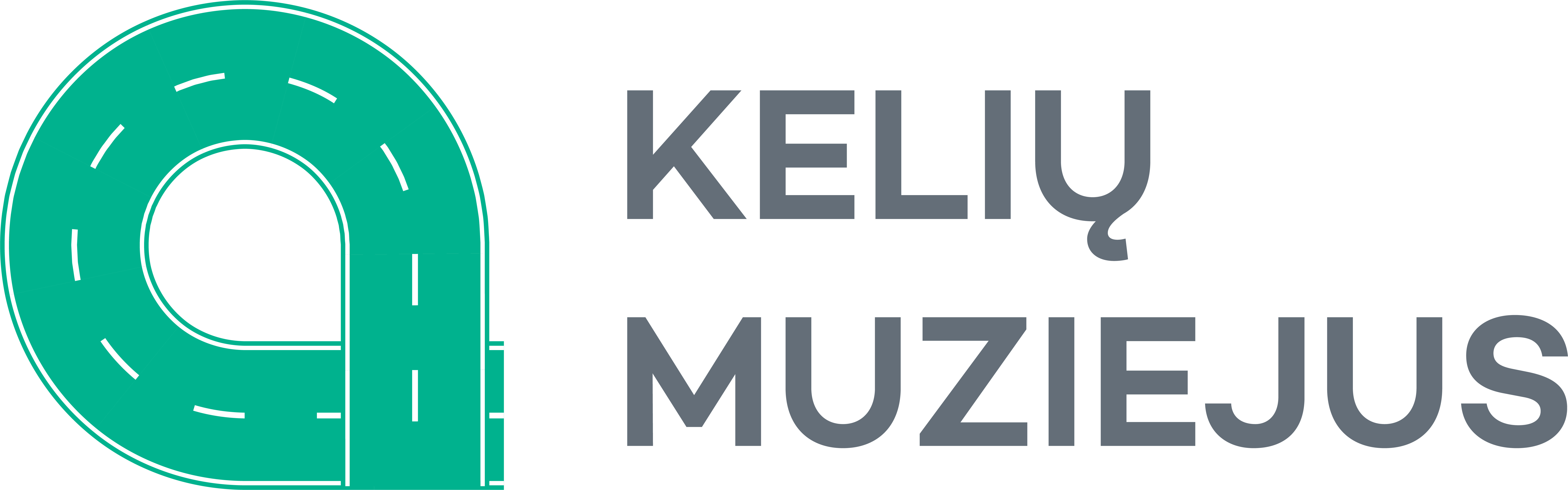
- Established: 19 October 1995
- Location: Kauno g. 14, LT-21372, Vievis, Lithuania
- Coordinates: 54°46′20.77″N 24°48′50.05″E
- Website: keliųmuziejus.lt

The Lithuanian Road Museum (Lithuanian: Lietuvos kelių muziejus) is a museum in Vievis, Lithuania, that exhibits the history of road building and road history. It was founded in 1995 to create a space where visitors could learn about the history of roads and the road maintenance exhibits collected over the years. The museum is owned by the state-owned company Kelių priežiūra and the Ministry of Transport and Communications of the Republic of Lithuania.

== History ==
With the restoration of the country's independence and the launch of the Lithuanian Motorway Directorate, the long-cherished vision of the road workers to start collecting and exhibiting material on the history of Lithuania's roads was fulfilled – the Lithuanian Road Museum was opened on October 19, 1995. The first director of the museum was Juozas Stepankevičius.

== Exposition ==
During more than 30 years of the museum's existence, the exhibition has been continuously expanded with new exhibits and now occupies two floors of the building. Heavy road construction and maintenance equipment are also displayed in a separate building and outdoor exhibition. The museum currently contains more than 8,000 items.

The museum displays old maps of Lithuania, photo albums, first books, and magazines about road construction. There are models of bridges, viaducts, bus stops, various other structures, the oldest road construction and maintenance tools, and road signs. Pre-war and post-war road construction and maintenance equipment are also on display. Visitors can also try out interactive activities: a road maintenance simulator and an augmented reality mirror.

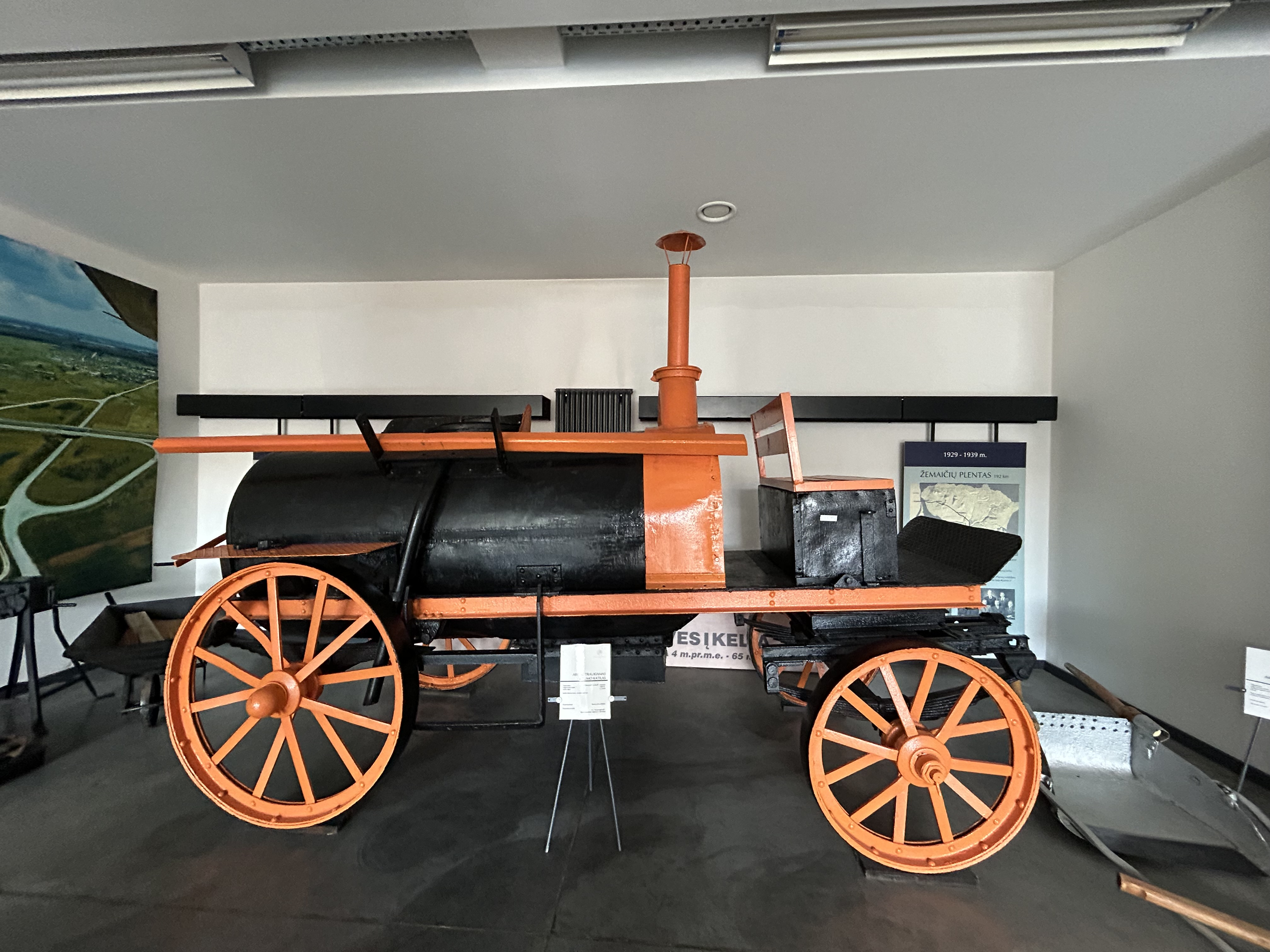
Horse-drawn bitumen boiler

One of the museum's most unique exhibits is a horse-drawn bitumen boiler made in Germany in 1854. For a long time, the boiler was forgotten until it was discovered on the old road workers' premises.

== Other activities ==
In 2025, a new piece of street art appeared on the wall of the Road Museum building – a map of Vievis town, where you can recognize the most famous places: the church, the bridge, the lake, and other objects. The work is also filled with road maintenance symbols that remind us of the museum's theme. It was created by one of Lithuania's first street artists, Timotiejus Norvila (Morfai), together with his team. This work invites us to reflect on how closely roads are connected to people's everyday lives.

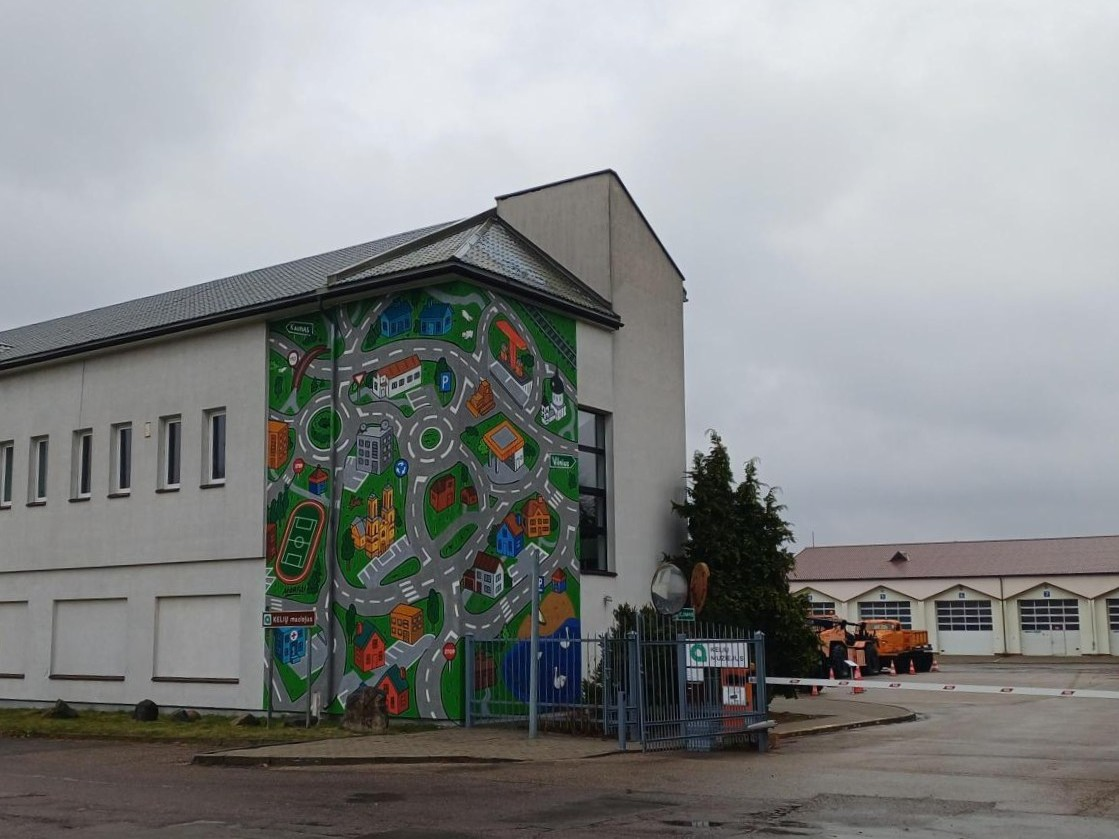
Street art at the Road Museum

The museum offers guided tours and educational activities for children and adults of all ages. The museum also provides live and remote education for schoolchildren under the Culture Pass program and offers five educational programs for different age groups.

The Road Museum houses exhibits that tell the story of Lithuanian road workers over the last hundred years. Many of the exhibits have been donated by the road workers themselves, revealing to visitors not only the stories of road work but also their own stories.

In 2015, to celebrate the museum's 20th anniversary, the book Lithuanian Road Museum was published. The book describes and illustrates the history of the museum and its past and present exhibits.

The Road Museum is also a member of the Lithuanian Museum Association.

== Museum's directors ==
- Juozas Stepankevičius (1995–2017)
- Erika Švermickienė (2017–2024)
- Rimantas Zagrebajev (since 2024)
