= Vievis =

- City
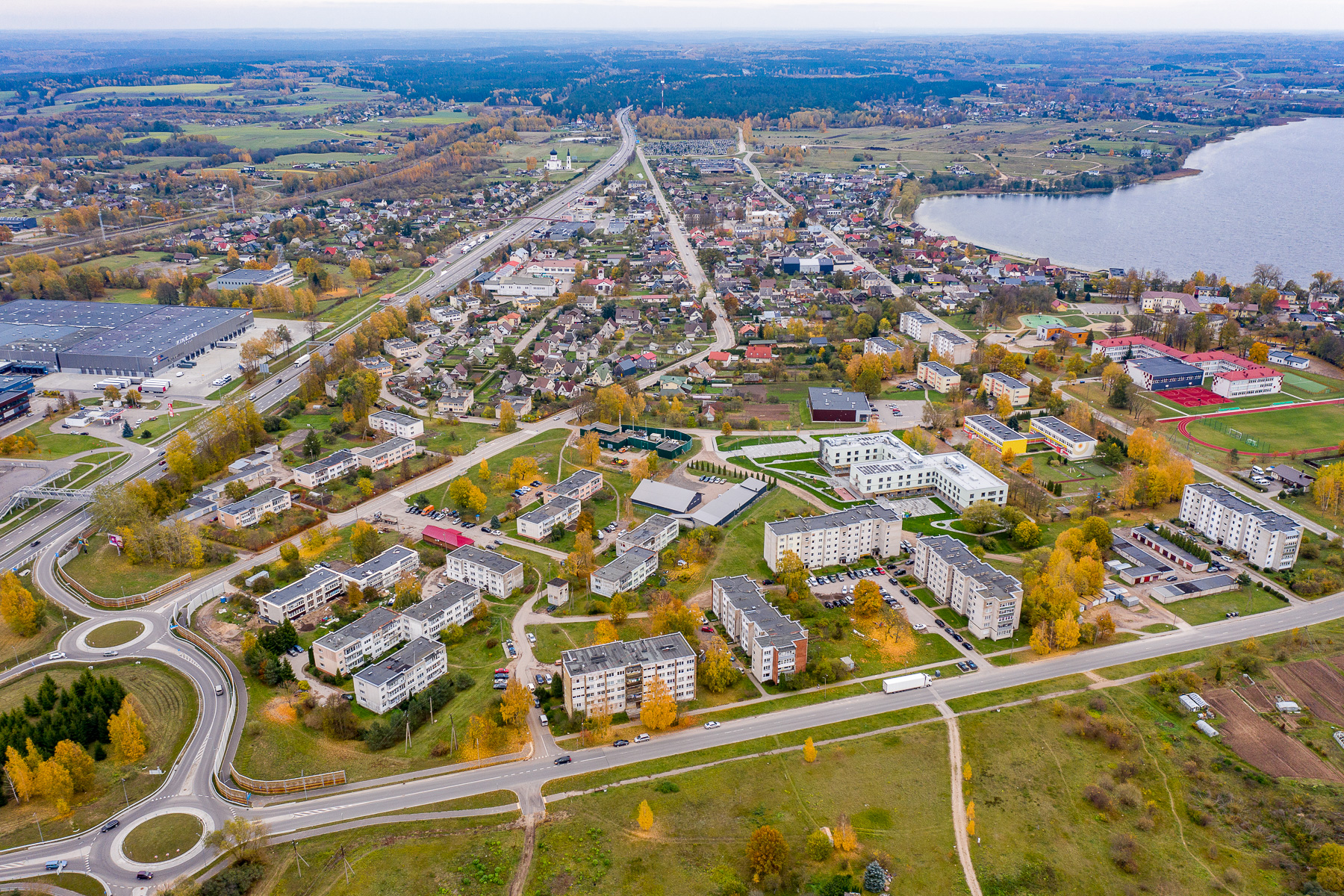
- Panorama of Vievis

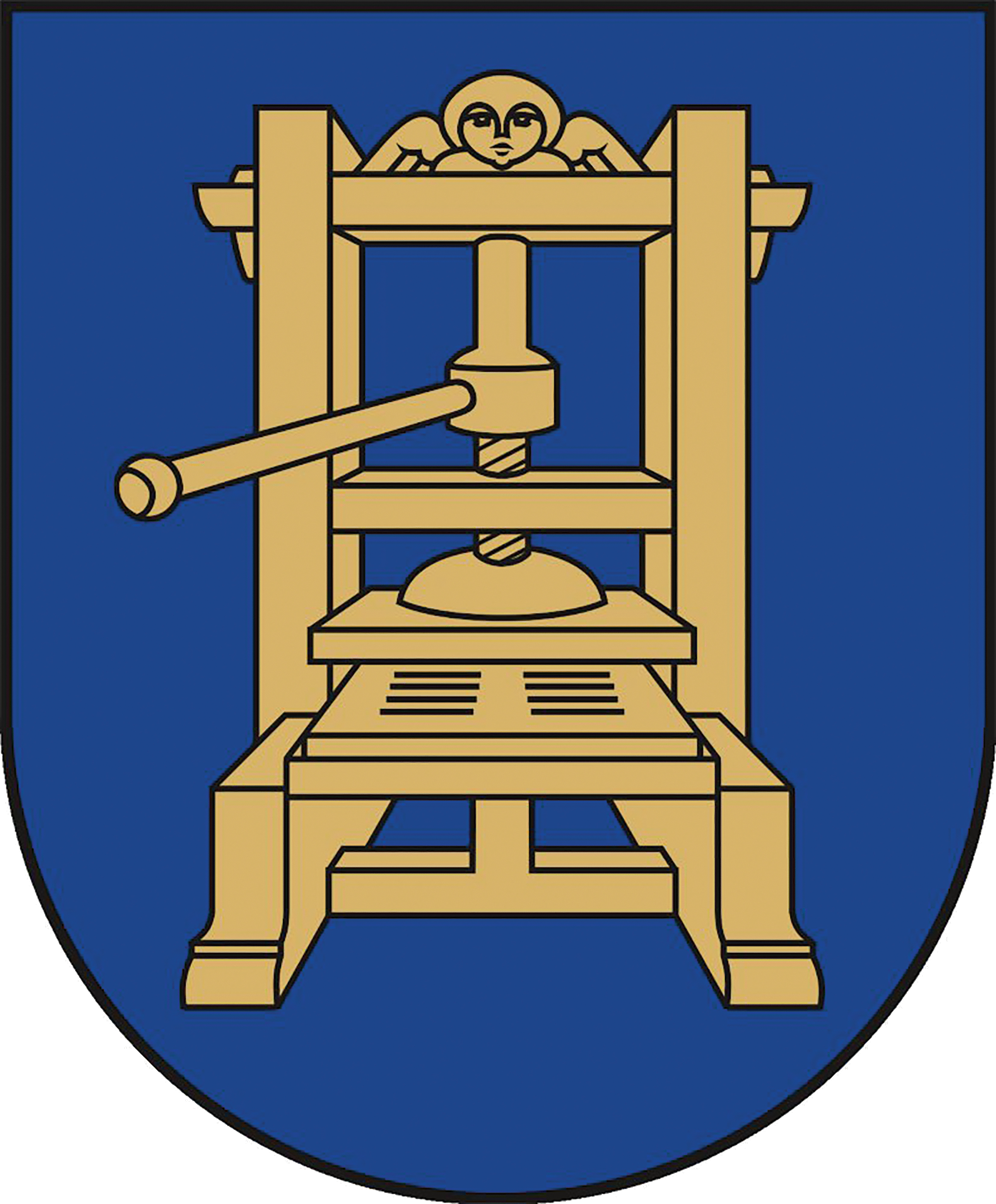
- Coat of arms

- Location of Vievis
- Coordinates: 54°46′30″N 24°48′30″E
- Country: Lithuania
- Ethnographic region: Dzūkija
- County: Vilnius County
- Municipality: Elektrėnai municipality
- Eldership: Vievis eldership
- Capital of: Vievis eldership
- First mentioned: 1539
- Granted city rights: 1950

Population (2025)
  - Total: 4,129
- Time zone: UTC+2 (EET)
  - Summer (DST): UTC+3 (EEST)

Vievis is a small city in Elektrėnai municipality, Lithuania. It is located 11 km east of Elektrėnai, on Lake Vievis in the Dzūkija ethnographic region and Vilnius County.

The population was listed as 4,129 in 2025. It currently ranks approximately 57th in population size among towns and cities in Lithuania.

== Name ==
Its alternate names include Anastasevskaya, Jewie (Polish), Vevis, Viyevis, V’yevis, and Yev’ye.

== History ==
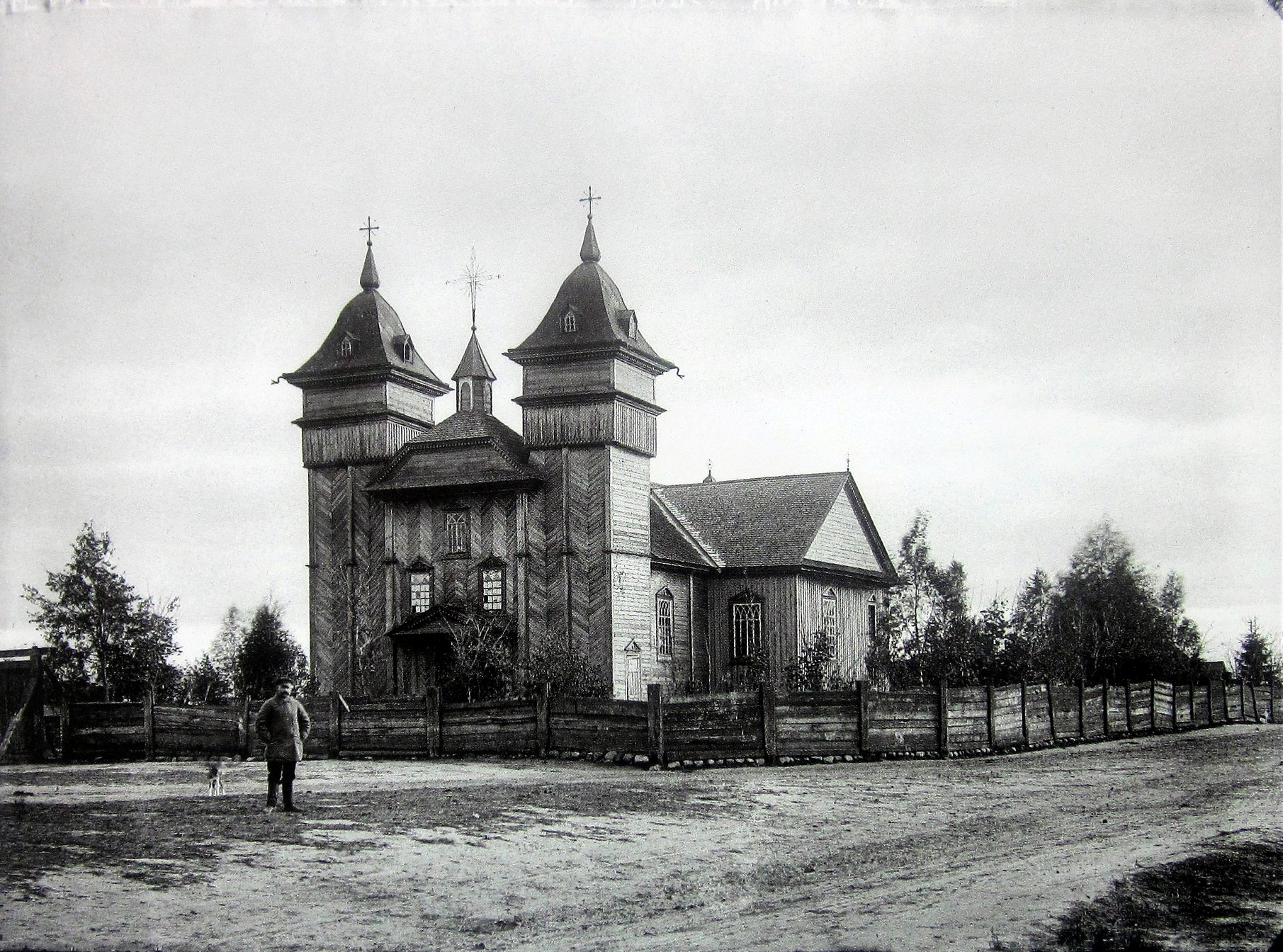
Old church in c. 1900

Vievis Manor was first mentioned in 1522. The town, which belonged to the Ogiński family, was mentioned in 1539. In the first half of the 16th century, the first Catholic church was built there. About 1600, the Ogiński family built a Uniate church and founded the abbey of the Holy Spirit (Lithuanian: Šventosios dvasios). At the beginning of the 17th century, a printing press was established near the abbey, notable for printing books by various Protestant Calvinist scholars. The printing press is featured on the modern coat of arms of the city, adopted in 1999.

In 1794 and 1812, the church burned down and was rebuilt in 1816. In 1837 an Orthodox church was built.

In the period between World War I and World War II, after the Polish–Lithuanian War, Vievis was near the dividing line between Lithuania and Poland. The town used to be among those with the largest Polish population, with roughly 77% inhabitants identifying themselves as Poles. In 2011 census, only 10.9% of inhabitants identified themselves as Poles as well as 3.74% Russians and 82.56% Lithuanians.

== Sights ==
The Lithuanian Road Museum is in the city.

== Gallery ==
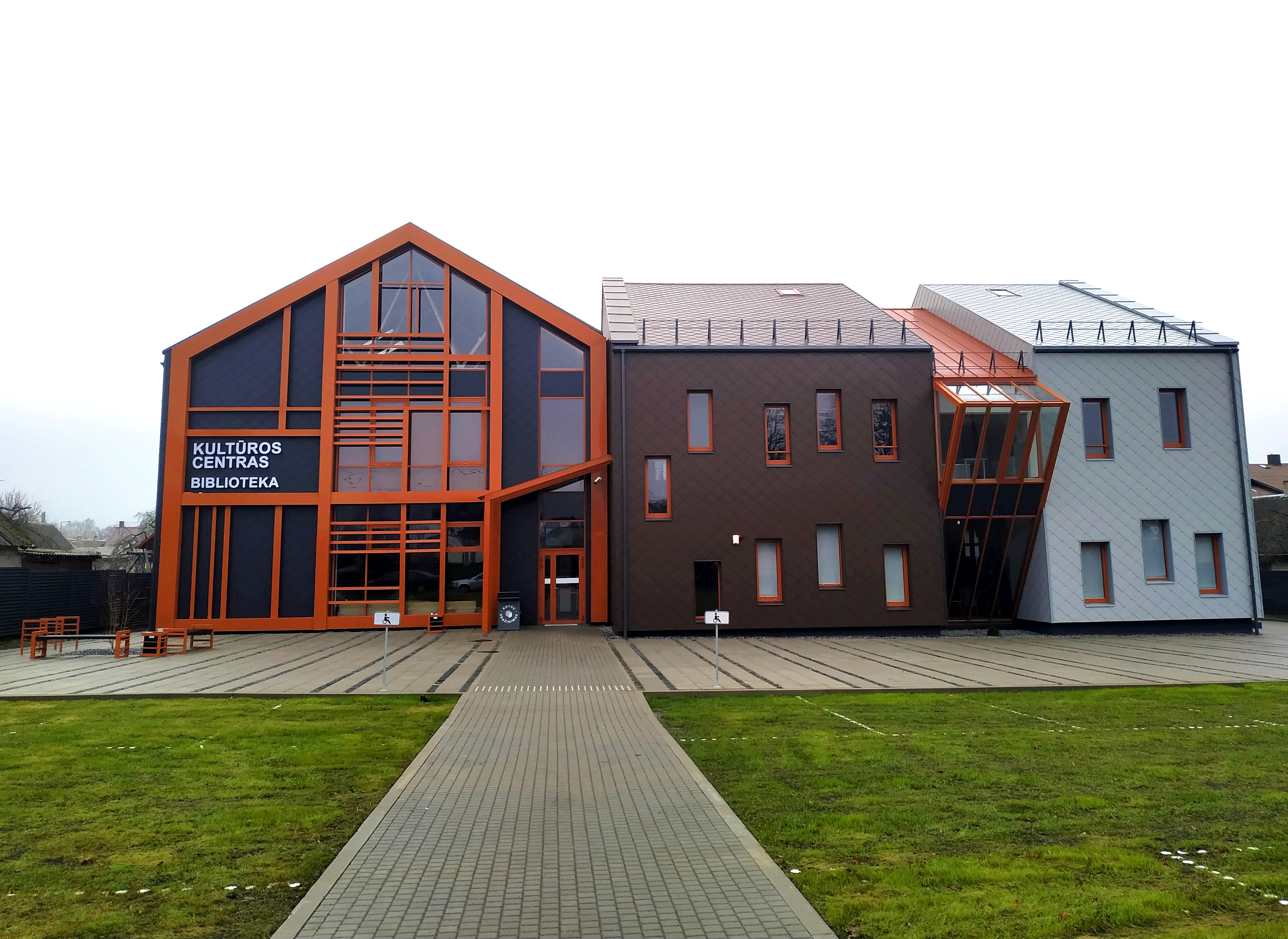
Cultural centre and library

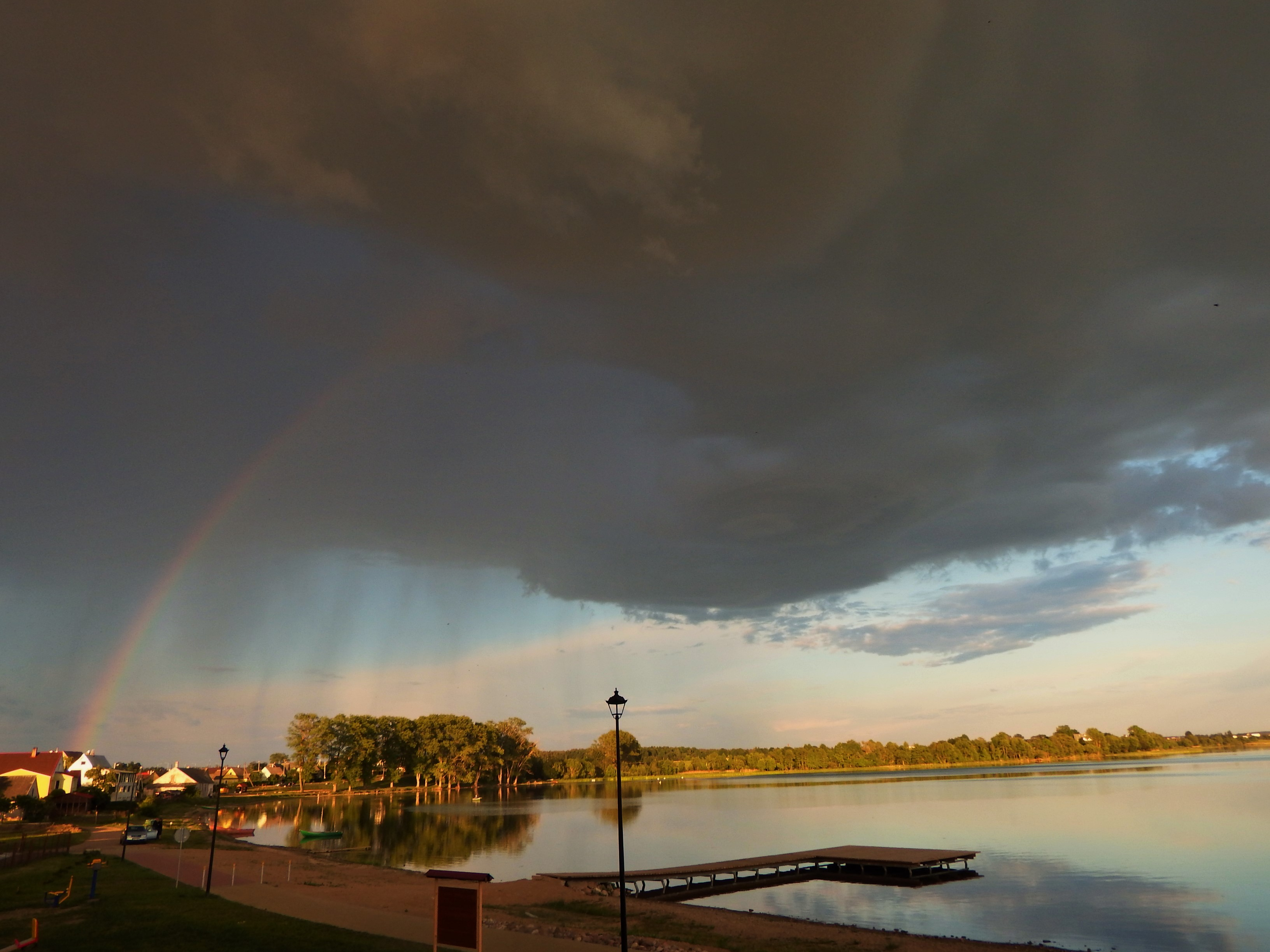
Lake Vievis

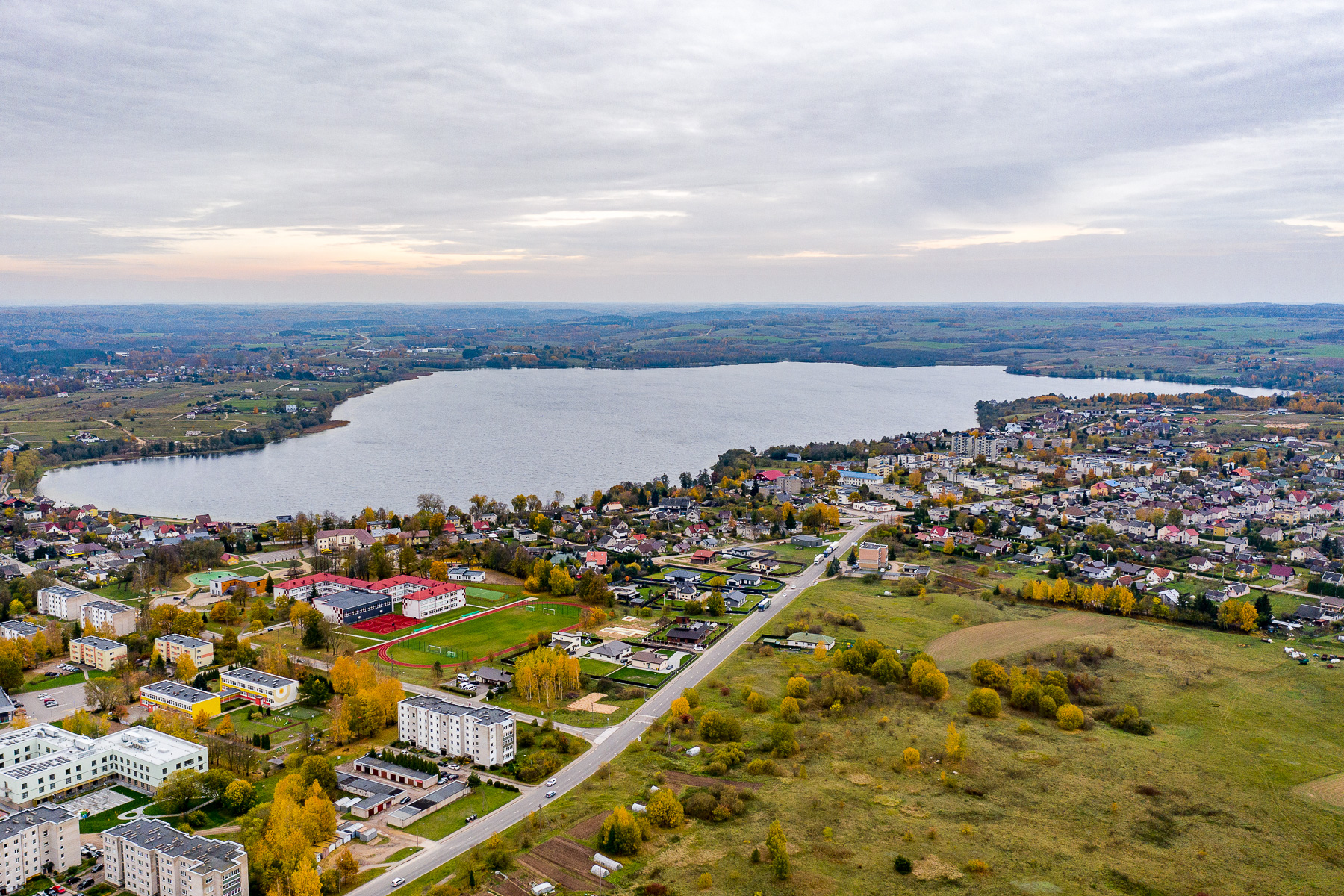
Aerial view of Lake Vievis

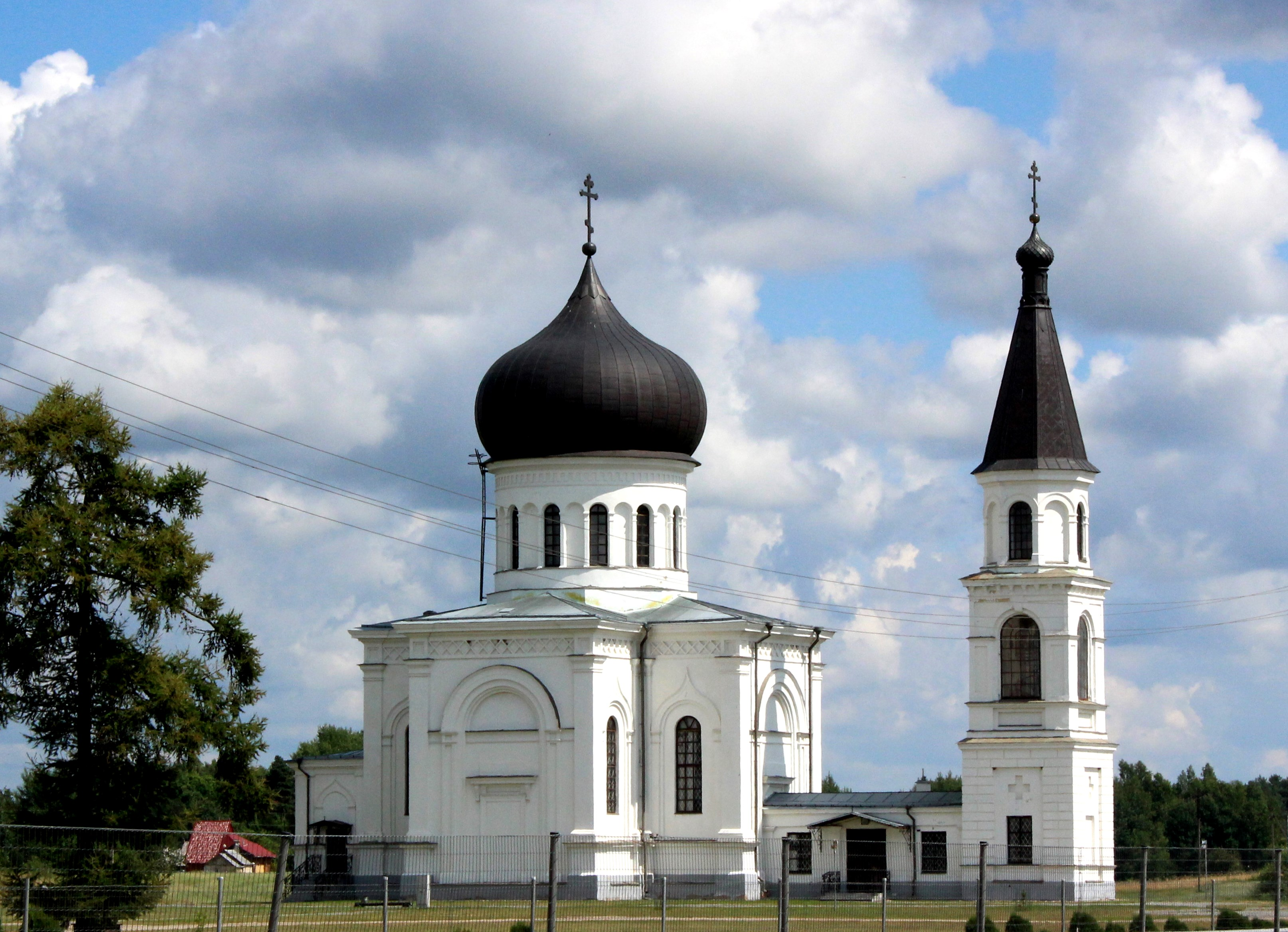
An 1843 Eastern Orthodox Church

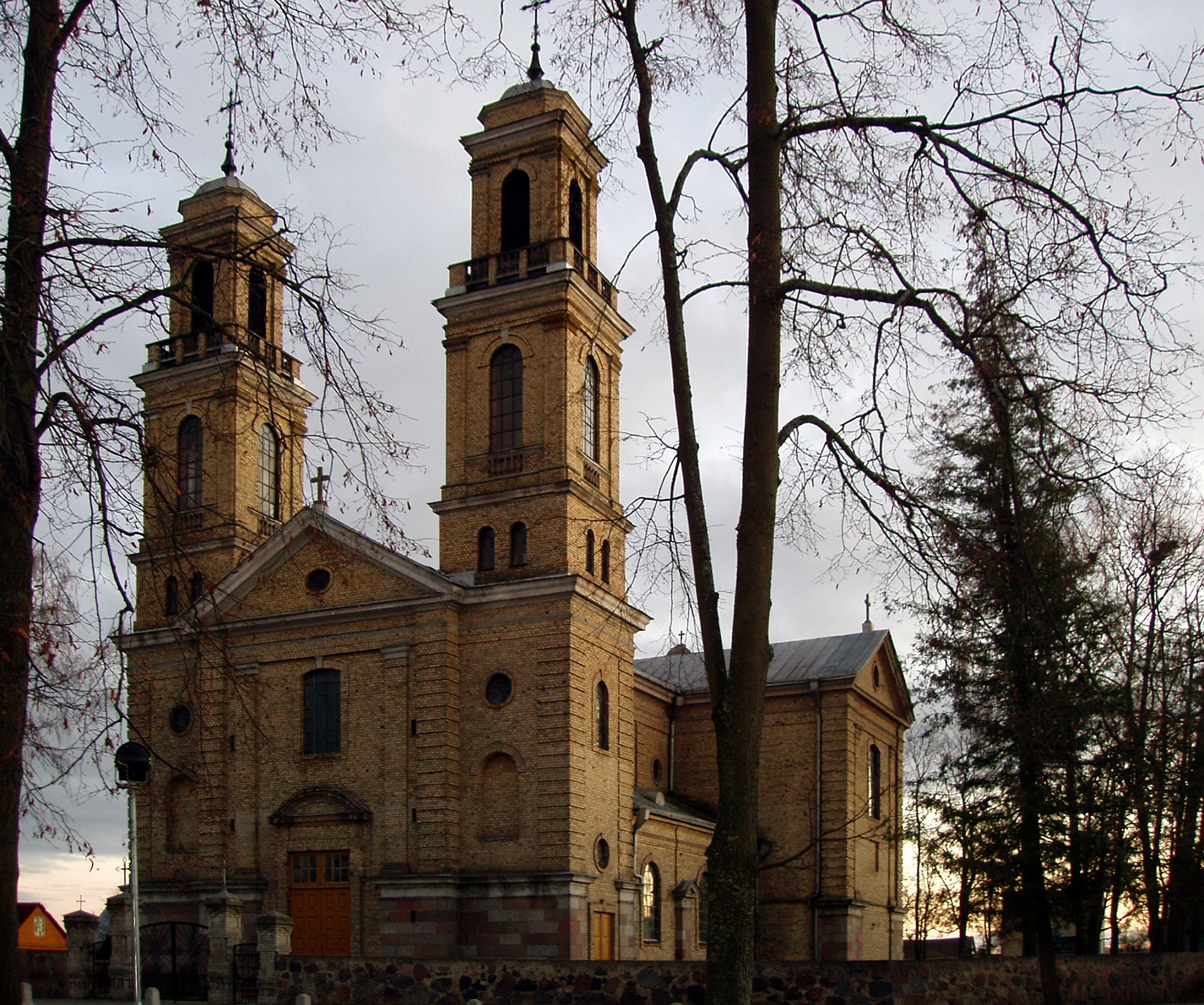
Church of St Anne

== Twin towns ==
- Óbuda-Békásmegyer – Hungary, since 2016
