= Česlovas Stankevičius =

Lithuanian politician

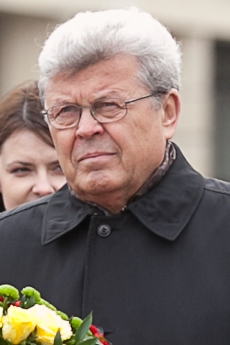
Česlovas Stankevičius in 2012

Česlovas Vytautas Stankevičius (born 27 February 1937) is a Lithuanian politician. In 1990 he was among those who signed the Act of the Re-Establishment of the State of Lithuania.
