= Audrius Butkevičius =

Lithuanian politician

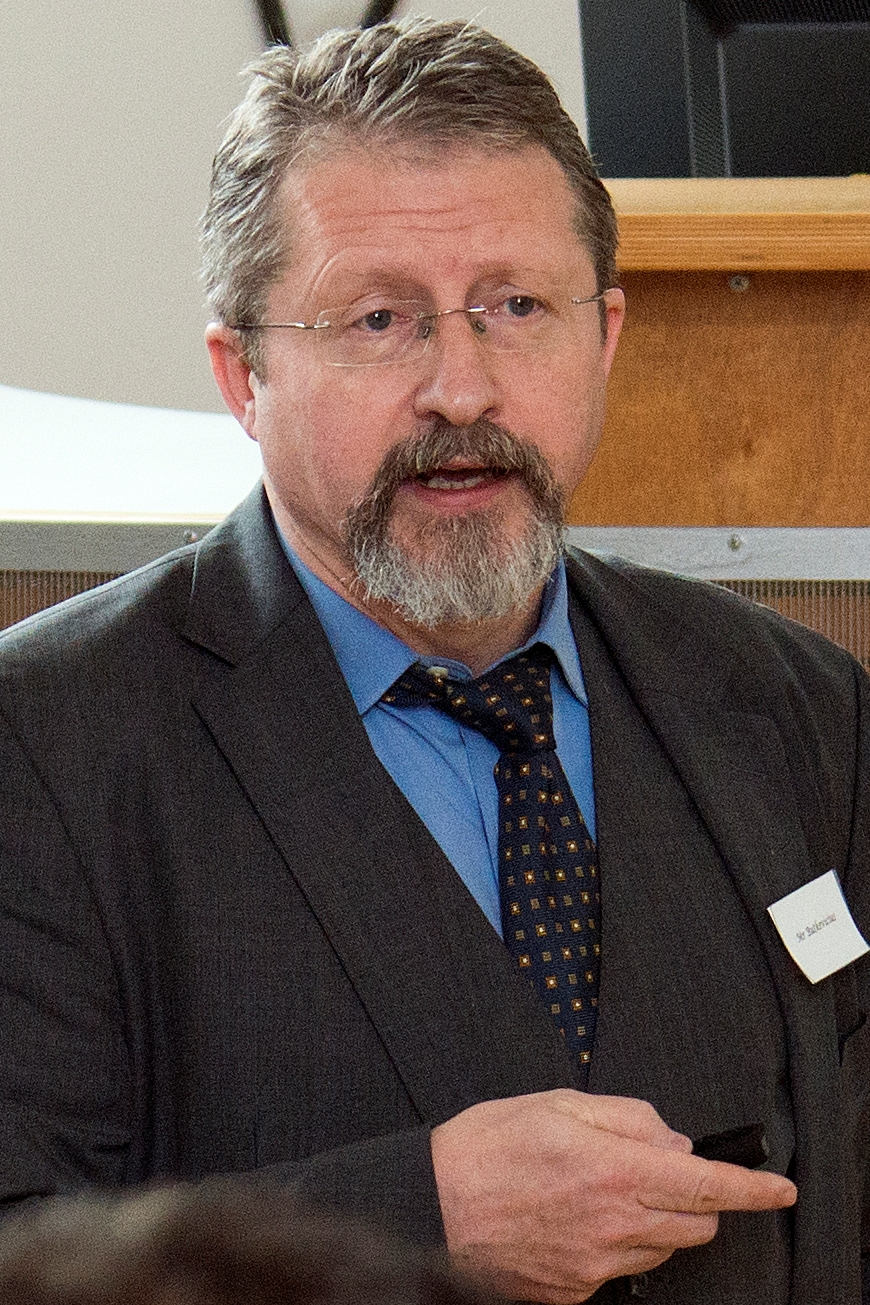
Audrius Butkevičius in 2015

Audrius Butkevičius (born 24 September 1960 in Kaunas) is a Lithuanian politician, a signatory of the Act of the Re-Establishment of the State of Lithuania, former minister of defense (1991–1993), and member of the Seimas (parliament of Lithuania) (1996–2000). He does not belong to any party.

In 1988 was one of the organizers of the Lithuanian reform Movement "Sąjūdis", a member of the Sąjūdis Seimas. He was an establisher and chairman of the "Tremtinio klubas" ("Club of Deportees") of Sąjūdis in Kaunas, the precursor of the Lithuanian Union of Political Prisoners and Deportees.

In the period of 1990–1993 he was in the state of negotiations with the Russian Federation. One notable issue that was raised was the withdrawal of the Russian troops stationed in Lithuania, whereupon Lithuania and Russia signed an agreement that declared that all of the Russian troops stationed on the territory of Lithuania must withdraw by 31 August 1993. The agreement was concluded on schedule.

In the late 1990s Butkevičius was convicted and jailed for fraud. On 12 August 1997 he was apprehended by the Lithuanian secret service agents in a hotel lobby while accepting 15,000 US dollars. After a brief explanation, he was permitted to leave. On 14 August criminal proceedings were instituted against him. He was eventually arrested on 28 October, whereupon he was imprisoned and sentenced to five and a half years in jail. He was released on 20 March 2000.

Subsequently, he appealed to the European Court of Human Rights. He stated that his detention was unlawful and that Articles 5 and 6 were breached. The court held the fact that these articles certainly were breached and that Lithuania was ordered to pay Butkevičius compensation.

In 2007, he was elected to Vilnius City Council.
