= Lithuanian National Defence Volunteer Forces =

National Defence Volunteer Forces
- Krašto apsaugos savanorių pajėgos
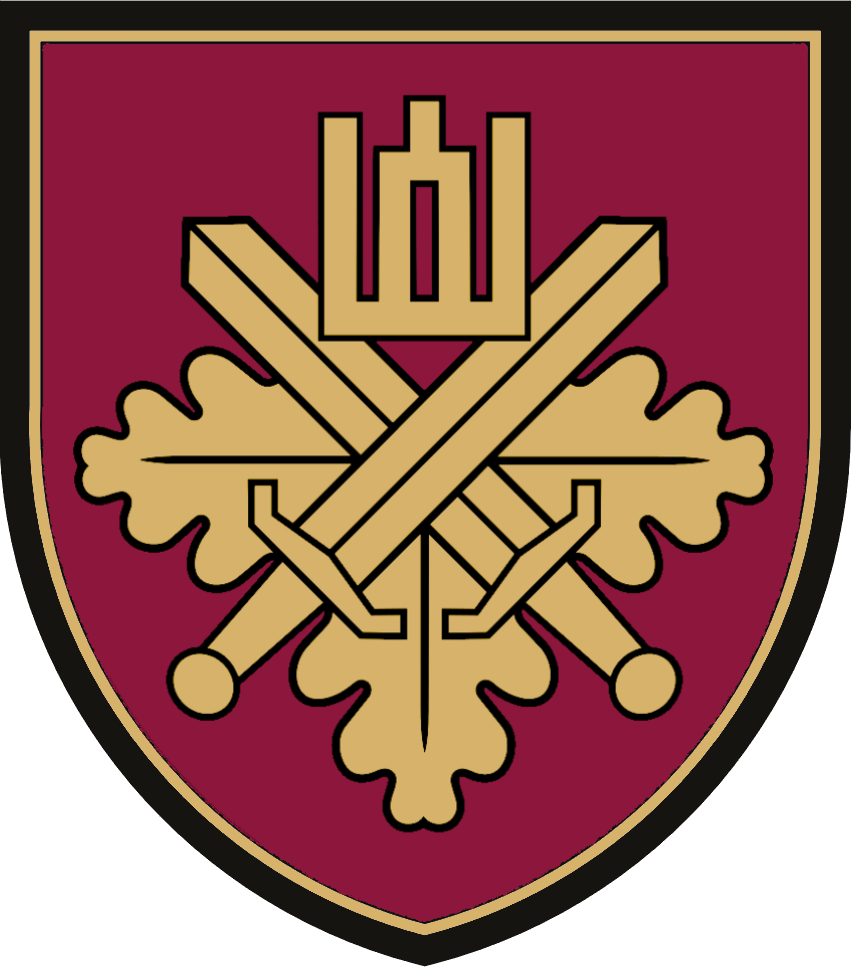
- Insignia of National Defence Volunteer Forces
- Founded: 1991
- Country: Lithuania
- Type: Military volunteer forces
- Size: more than 5,600 active personnel
- Part of: Lithuanian Armed Forces
- Garrison/HQ: Vilnius
- Anniversaries: 17 January 1991

Commanders
- Current commander: Colonel Darius Vaicikauskas

Insignia
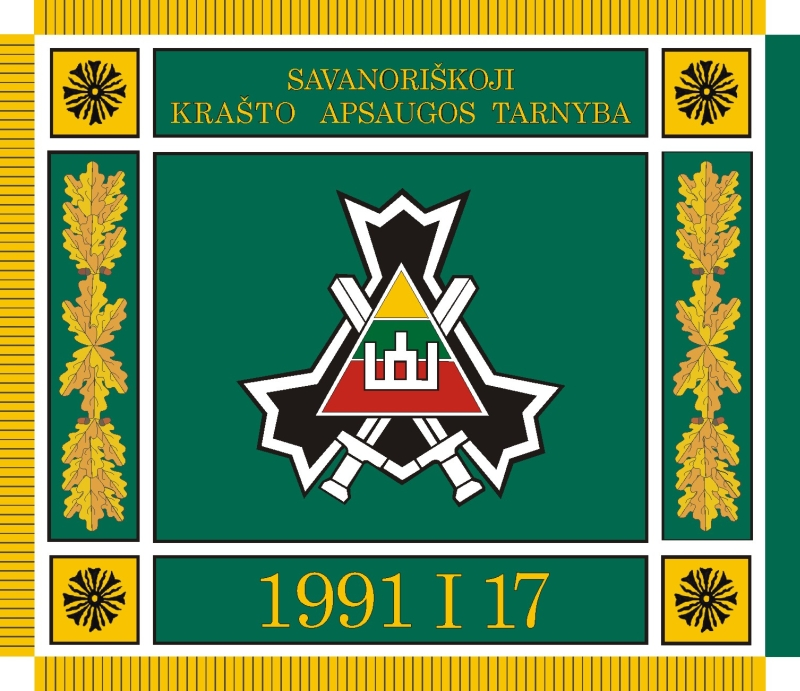
- Flag

The National Defence Volunteer Forces or NDVF (Lithuanian: Krašto apsaugos savanorių pajėgos [KASP], previously Savanoriškoji krašto apsaugos tarnyba [SKAT]) is a branch of the Lithuanian Armed Forces. Volunteer forces were officially established on 17 January 1991 by the law of the Supreme Council of Lithuania on the National Defence Volunteer Service providing the basis for establishing the Voluntary National Defence Service. This decision legalised the already existing volunteer formations that began appearing as early as 1990. The Voluntary National Defence Service was later reorganised into the National Defence Volunteer Force. In 2003, the Volunteer Force was integrated into the Lithuanian Land Force. Tasks of volunteer soldiers were inevitably altered when Lithuania became a full-fledged member of NATO: approach of territorial defence was changed into territorial defence and training of modern active reserve. There are around 5,000 volunteers and around 800 professional soldiers in the force.

== History ==
=== Origins ===
The NDVF's history is somewhat linked to the Lithuanian Riflemen's Union, which was the largest self-defence forces organization with official status in Lithuania before the Soviet occupation in 1940. Also Territorial dragoon service can be considered an indirect predecessor of today's NDVF (according to the way military service is performed).

During 1991 all units of the National Defence System were formed on a voluntary basis.

On 11 January 1991 several hundred of the Parliament defenders took an oath of allegiance to the Republic of Lithuania and with support from the public began preparing for a possible attack against the Lithuanian Supreme Council building (presently the Parliament of Lithuania). Other volunteers joined units to protect facilities of the Press Palace, Vilnius Television Tower, and other strategic assets when the Soviet Union attempted to overthrow the legal government of Lithuania and reintroduce an occupational regime in January 1991.

On 17 January 1991 the Supreme Council of the Republic of Lithuania passed the law on the National Defence Volunteer Service, which became the basis for the establishment of the then Voluntary National Defence Service (VNDS).

In March 1991 the VNDS staff, an operational platoon, the VNDS Training Centre were formed as well as 200 company-size units were organized into eight territorial defence regions. In accordance with an order issued by Director General of Department of National Defence, Colonel Jonas Gečas was appointed as the Chief of Staff of the Voluntary National Defence Service.

=== 1991 Soviet coup attempt ===
During the 1991 Soviet coup d'état attempt, volunteer serviceman Artūras Sakalauskas lost his life in the line of duty when defending the Lithuanian Supreme Council on 21 August.

Once the coup d'état was defeated, NDVS units received an order to block the Soviet forces in order to prevent them from bringing replacement troops from Russia into Lithuania. At that time forty-four guard posts were installed where 201 NDVS members would simultaneously stand on duty. At the end of 1991, the Volunteer Forces embarked upon the protection of national strategic assets.

=== Current duties ===
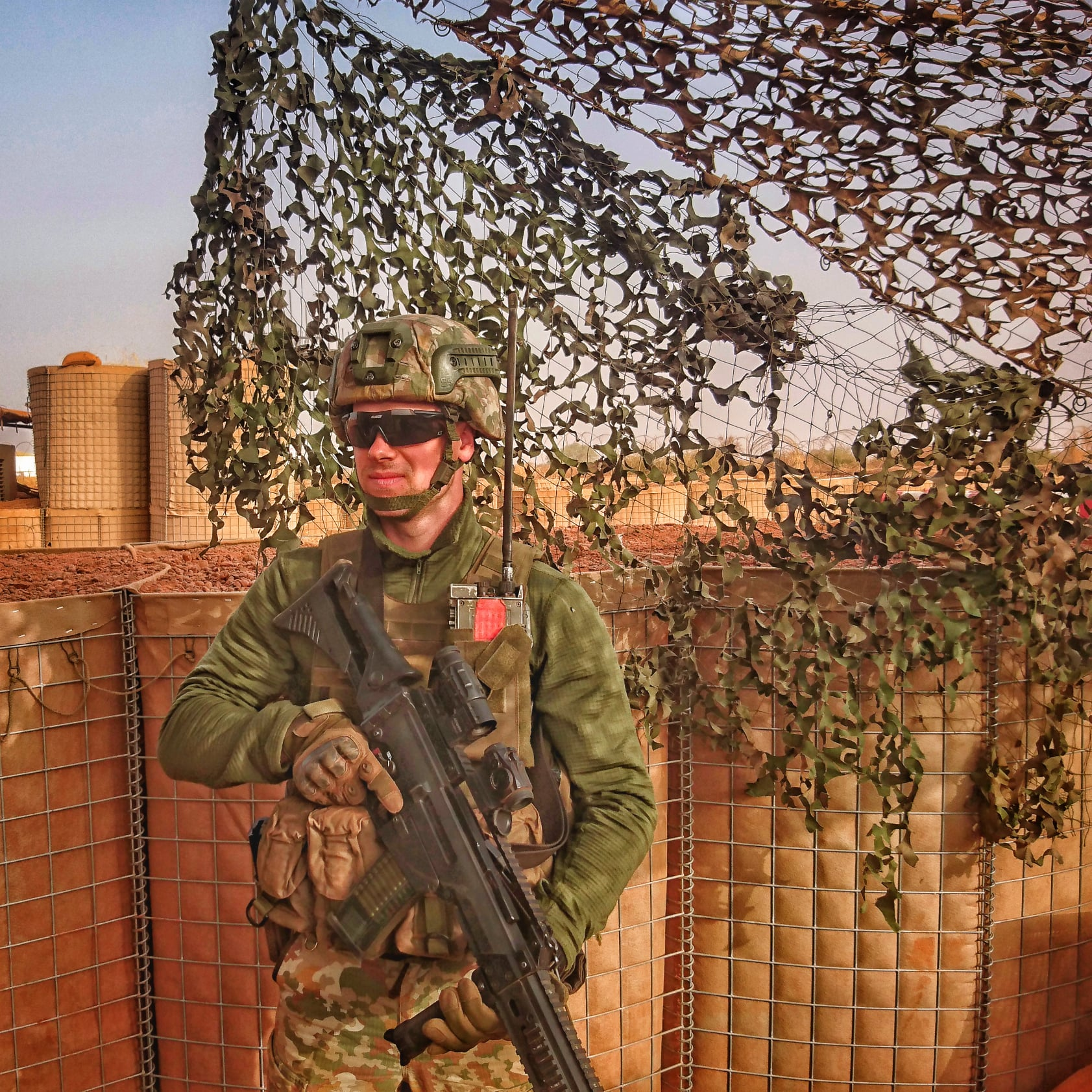
NDVF soldier during the operation in Mali, 2018

Volunteer units provided support to civilian authorities in the event of natural or industrial disasters. In the summer of 1992, thousands of volunteers assisted in fighting fires in wooded areas and peat lands; they participated in cleaning hazardous spill on the Nemunas River subsequent to an ecological disaster in Belarus. They also took part in relief activities during the flood of the Nemunas Delta in the Western part of Lithuania. In 1993, during a visit of Pope John Paul II to Lithuania, thousands of volunteers helped the police maintain public order.

The Volunteer units took part in the first military exercises organised by the Lithuanian Armed Forces including the first joint military exercises Safeguard '93, Wind of Spring (1997–1998), Baltic Challenge (1998), Amber Hope series.

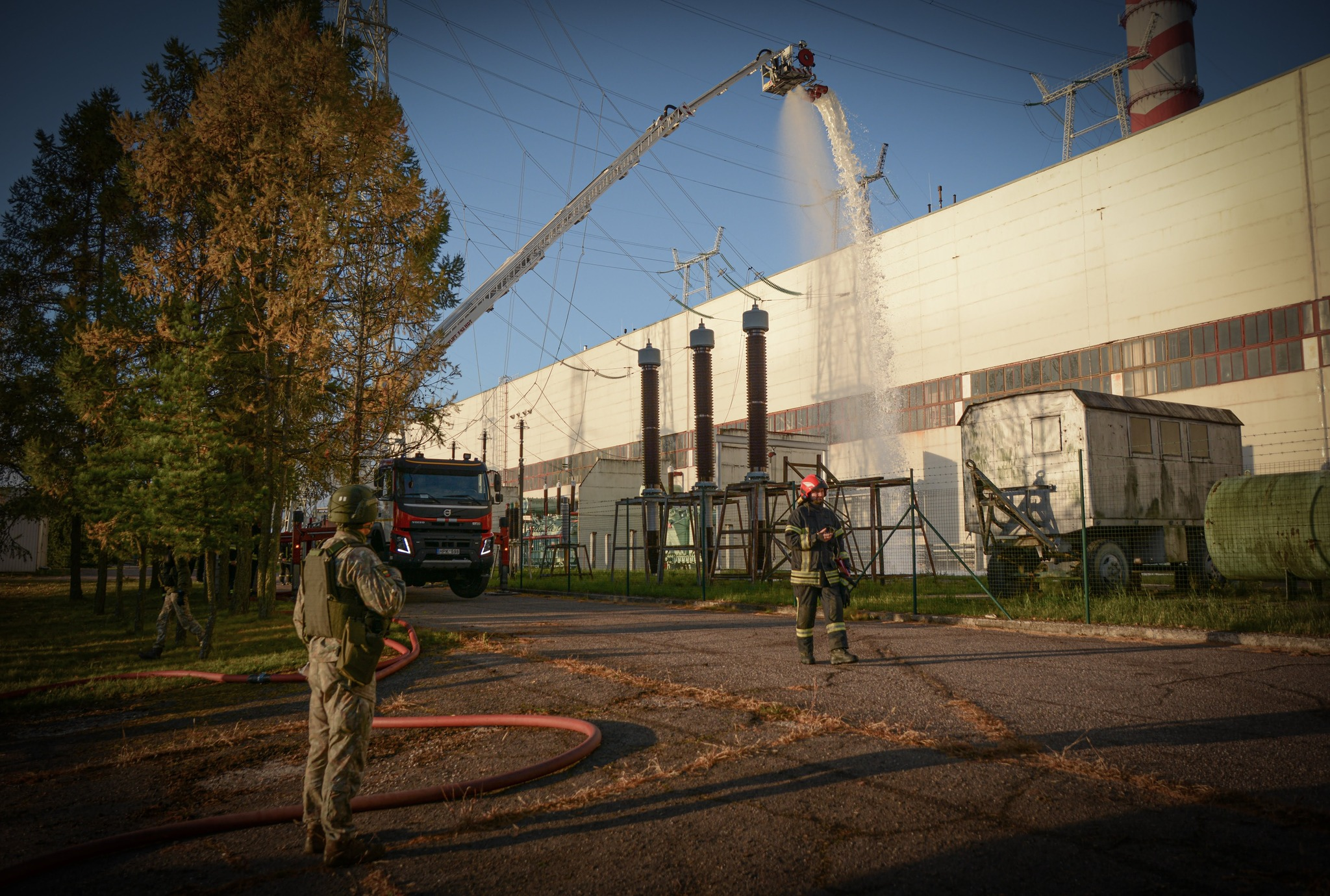
NDVF volunteers during peacetime task training

Starting in 1994 members of the Volunteer Forces began participating international peacekeeping missions.

In 1998 the Voluntary National Defence Service (SKAT in Lithuanian) was reorganised as the National Defence Volunteer Forces, KASP – in Lithuanian) and became an integral part of the Lithuanian Armed Forces.

== Organization 2023 ==
As of May 2023 the organization of the National Defence Volunteer Forces is as follows:

- National Defence Volunteer Forces, in Vilnius
  - 1st Territorial Unit Dainava District, in Alytus
    - Headquarters & Supply Company, in Alytus
    - 10× infantry companies, in Alytus, Varėna, Lazdijai, Vilkaviškis, Marijampolė, Druskininkai, and Kalvarija
  - 2nd Territorial Unit Darius and Girėnas District, in Kaunas
    - Headquarters & Supply Company, in Kaunas
    - 9× infantry companies
  - 3rd Territorial Unit Žemaičiai District, in Klaipėda
    - Headquarters & Supply Company, in Klaipėda
    - 9× infantry companies, in Klaipėda (2×), Gargždai, Plungė, Skuodas, Šilutė, Kretinga, Tauragė, and Šilalė
  - 5th Territorial Unit Vytis District, in Panevėžys
    - Headquarters & Supply Company, in Panevėžys
    - 9× infantry companies, in Panevėžys (2×), Pasvalys, Biržai, Kupiškis, Rokiškis, Anykščiai, Utena, and Zarasai
  - 6th Territorial Unit Prisikėlimo District, in Šiauliai
    - Headquarters & Supply Company, in Šiauliai
    - 9× infantry companies Šiauliai (2×), Mažeikiai, Telšiai, Kelmė, Joniškis, Pakruojis, Radviliškis, and Naujoji Akmenė
  - 8th Territorial defense unit of the Great Battle District, in Vilnius
    - 10× infantry companies Vilnius (3×), Nemenčinė, Trakai, Ukmergė, Molėtai, Ignalina, Švenčionys, and Šalčininkai
    - Non-kinetic Operations Company, in Vilnius

Official date of establishment of the (SKAT) Vilnius territorial unit (now - the 8th Territorial Unit of NDVF National Defense Volunteer Forces (KASP) Great Battle District is 1991. on March 1, when the first staff list of the territorial defense unit was approved.

In 1992 On November 23, commemorating the Day of the Lithuanian Armed Forces, a battle flag was presented to the unit at the Cathedral Square in Vilnius.

In 1999 On January 15, in order to perpetuate the names of the military districts of the partisans of the Lithuanian freedom movement, the Unit was given a name and it is called the 8th Territorial defense unit of the Great Battle District.

It has over 1,000 volunteer soldiers and ~80 professional military servicemen serve together with Staff Headquarters & Supply Company, in Vilnius.

== Functions ==
Tasks of the NDVF are training volunteers and other members of active reserve, units of NDVF for conducting territorial and collective defence tasks, preparing and participating in international operations, guarding important objects of defence infrastructure, state and municipal administration, and render assistance in case of natural disasters and catastrophes.

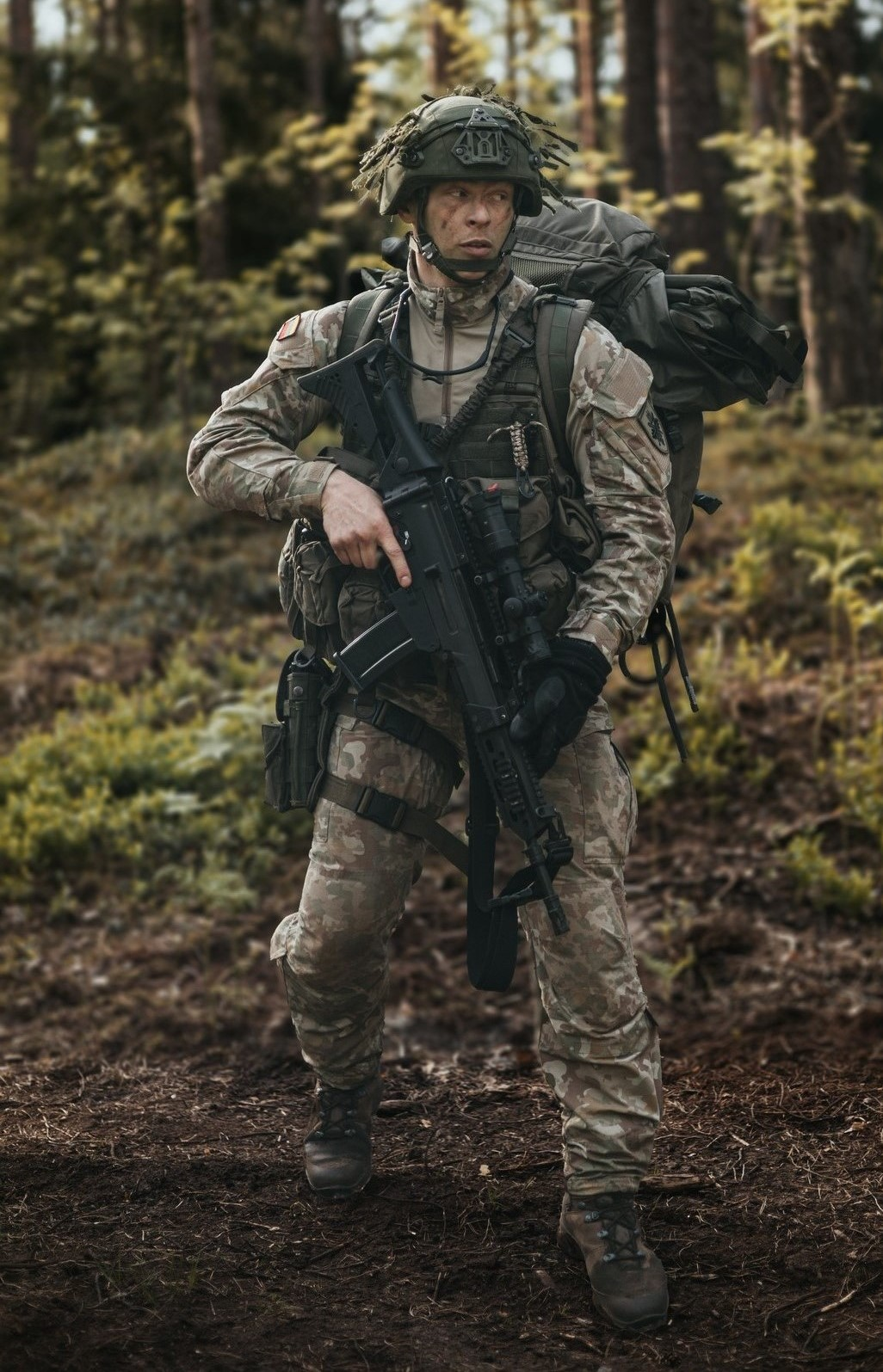
A soldier of the Lithuanian National Defence Volunteer Forces, c. 2024.

1. provide trained personnel for regular units of the Lithuanian Armed Forces, by transferring them to a higher readiness level or deployment to multinational operations;
2. prepares specialists of various fields and infantry units of up to company size for international deployment;
3. participates in providing host nation support to NATO or the Allied forces;
4. conducts peacetime tasks defined in legislation;
5. plans and conducts warfare training of volunteer soldiers;
6. develops cooperation with corresponding organisations in other countries regarding matters of warfare training of NDVF;
7. provides support for governmental and municipal institutions according to the order set by legal acts;
8. performs tasks of guarding vital objects of defence infrastructure, state and municipalities;
9. represents Lithuanian Armed Forces in the community: strengthens connection between the community and the armed forces, organises and conducts military patriotic education of youth, maintains close relations with local community, participates in public life, festivals and events within its scope;
10. is responsible for delivering technical provision and supplies for subordinate units, controls consumption of supplies;
11. organises maintenance, and effective and economical usage according to the purpose of the NDVF military and other equipment and other assets;
12. trains soldiers of NDVF and provides them with appropriate service conditions;
13. Performs other functions related to the tasks of NDVF if so designated by laws or other legal acts.

== Equipment ==
| Weapon | Origin | Type |
|---|---|---|
| Colt M1911 | United States | Semi-automatic pistol |
| Heckler & Koch VP9 | Germany | Semi-automatic pistol |
| Heckler & Koch G36 | Germany | Assault rifle |
| AK 4MT | Sweden | Assault rifle |
| FN SCAR | Belgium | Assault rifle |
| M14 rifle | United States | Sniper rifle |
| FN MAG | Belgium | Machine gun |
| FN Minimi | Belgium | Machine gun |
| MG 3 | Germany | Machine gun |
| M72 LAW | United States | Rocket launcher |
| Carl Gustav | Sweden | Rocket launcher |
| AT4 | Sweden | Rocket launcher |
| Mercedes Benz 1213 | Germany | Vehicle |
| Mercedes Benz GD | Germany | Vehicle |
| Unimog 4x4 | Germany | Vehicle |

== Sources ==
- Ministry of National Defence Republic of Lithuania
- Military of Lithuania
