= 2024 Lithuanian parliamentary election =

- 13 October 2024 (first round); 27 October 2024 (second round)
- All 141 seats in the Seimas; 71 seats needed for a majority
- Turnout: 52.20% (▲4.39pp)
Party	Leader	Vote %	Seats	+/–
LSDP	Vilija Blinkevičiūtė	19.70	52	+39
TS–LKD	Gabrielius Landsbergis	18.35	28	−22
NA	Remigijus Žemaitaitis	15.26	20	New
DSVL	Saulius Skvernelis	9.40	14	New
LS	Viktorija Čmilytė-Nielsen	7.85	12	−1
LVŽS	Ramūnas Karbauskis	7.16	8	−24
LLRA–KŠS	Waldemar Tomaszewski	3.96	3	0
NS	Vytautas Radžvilas	2.93	1	+1
PLT	Artūras Zuokas	0.77	1	0
Independents	–	–	2	−2
This lists parties that won seats. See the complete results below.

Prime Minister before	Prime Minister after
Ingrida Šimonytė; TS–LKD	Gintautas Paluckas; LSDP

Parliamentary elections were held in Lithuania on 13 and 27 October 2024 to elect the 141 members of the Seimas. Members were elected in 71 single-member constituencies using the two-round system, and the remaining 70 in a single nationwide constituency using proportional representation. The first round was held on 13 October and the second round on 27 October.

The elections were won by the Social Democratic Party of Lithuania (LSDP), which secured 19.32% of the popular vote and 52 seats, up from 9.58% and 13 seats in the previous elections in 2020. The Homeland Union (TS–LKD), the largest party in the ruling centre-right coalition in the preceding Seimas, finished a distant second, securing 28 seats, down from its previous 50.

Following the first round of the election, the Social Democrats entered into coalition talks with the Lithuanian Farmers and Greens Union (LVŽS) and the Union of Democrats "For Lithuania" (DSVL), which had split from the latter. After the second round, the consultations were expanded to include the Liberals' Movement (LS), which had been part of the outgoing conservative-led coalition, and Dawn of Nemunas (PPNA), a new nationalist party that finished in third place overall.

The LSDP eventually reached a deal with DSVL and PPNA to form a coalition government. The Social Democrats' decision to include the Dawn of Nemunas party, whose founder is known for making controversial statements, prompted domestic and international backlash.

== Background ==
The 2020 election was won by the Homeland Union, which formed a coalition with the Liberal Movement and Freedom Party. The Šimonytė Cabinet was appointed by President Gitanas Nausėda on 7 December 2020, after the Seimas approved Ingrida Šimonytė as prime minister. On 11 December, the Government program was approved, thus the cabinet officially took office. Major domestic and foreign events during the term include the COVID-19 pandemic in Lithuania, 2020–2021 Belarusian protests and the Belarus–European Union border crisis and the Russian invasion of Ukraine.

The 2023 Lithuanian municipal elections were won by the opposition Social Democratic Party of Lithuania, with the Homeland Union at second place, and the Homeland Union candidate Ingrida Šimonytė was defeated by incumbent Gitanas Nausėda in the 2024 Lithuanian presidential election with the largest share of the vote in the history of presidential elections in Lithuania. However, the Homeland Union finished at first place in the 2024 European Parliament election in Lithuania, with the Social Democrats at second place. The Lithuanian Farmers and Greens Union, which was the largest party in the Seimas prior to the 2020 parliamentary election, split, with the defectors forming the Union of Democrats "For Lithuania", and finished third in the 2023 municipal and the 2024 European Parliament elections.

Other notable changes in the political landscape since 2020 included the establishment of Dawn of Nemunas, led by presidential candidate Remigijus Žemaitaitis after his expulsion from Freedom and Justice due to his antisemitic statements, which grew in popularity after the 2024 presidential election, as well as the poor performance of the Labour Party, which failed to win a deputy in the European Parliament for the first time since its establishment in 2003, and which was subsequently abandoned by several of the party's members of parliament, which led to the collapse of the party's parliamentary group.

=== Electoral seat allocation ===
There were 1,740 candidates running for seats in the parliament, including 8 mayors, 4 MEPs and 128 current members of the Seimas. Additionally, 700 politicians vied for seats in 71 single-mandate constituencies.

Half of the seats in the 141-member parliament are allocated to at-large party lists that will clear the 5-percent threshold.

=== Changes to the constitution and new electoral code ===
After passing amendment of Constitution's article No. 56 in April 2022, to be eligible for election, candidates must be at least 21 years old on the election day, not under allegiance to a foreign state and permanently reside in Lithuania, while previously, candidates needed to be at least 25 years old on the election day. Persons serving or due to serve a sentence imposed by the court 65 days before the election are not eligible. Also, judges, citizens performing military service, and servicemen of professional military service and officials of statutory institutions and establishments may not run for election. In addition, a person who has been removed from office through impeachment may be elected after 10 year period after impeachment.

The Electoral Code was adopted on 23 June 2022. The Code replaced various electoral acts and introduced several changes to the parliamentary elections. It allowed the establishment more than one overseas constituency and removed a ban of political parties' campaigning on Saturdays (e. g. one day prior to the election). The Electoral Code introduced changes for members to be elected in single-member constituencies. Prior to change, leading candidates needed to obtain over 50 per cent of all votes (including invalid ballots) to be elected in the first round. After the change, leading candidates needed to obtain just over 20 per cent of votes from all registered voters in a particular single-member constituency.

=== Impeached politicians that will be eligible for reelection ===
Politician	Party at time of impeachment	Impeachment date	Eligibility date for running
President of the Republic Rolandas Paksas	Independent	6 April 2004	6 April 2014
Member of Seimas Linas Karalius	National Resurrection Party	11 November 2010	11 November 2020
Member of Seimas Neringa Venckienė	The Way of Courage	19 June 2014	19 June 2024

=== Boundary changes ===
In 2023, single-member constituencies were redrawn. Most boundary changes happened in Klaipėda, Kaunas, Vilnius and their suburbs.

LLRA–KŠS accused some boundary changes as being an attempt of "artificial dilution of the minority electorate".

== Electoral system ==
The Seimas has 141 members, elected to a four-year term in parallel voting, with 71 members elected in single-seat constituencies using the two-round system and 70 members elected by proportional representation. The voting in the elections is open to all citizens of Lithuania who are at least 18 years old.

Parliament members in the 71 single-seat constituencies are elected in a majority vote; or per a new provision instituted in 2022, a leading candidate in a constituency is directly elected if they receive the support of one fifth of registered voters. A run-off is held within 15 days, if necessary. The remaining 70 seats are allocated to the participating political parties using the largest remainder method. Parties normally need to receive at least 5% (7% for multi-party electoral lists) of the votes to be eligible for a seat. Candidates take the seats allocated to their parties based on the preference lists submitted before the election and adjusted by preference votes given by the voters.

For the 2024 election, around 2.4 million people were eligible to vote.

== Campaign ==
=== Announcement ===
On 9 April 2024 the president of Lithuania, Gitanas Nausėda, officially announced 13 October 2024 as the election date. The announcement launched the election campaign, allowing the potential participants to register for the elections, raise funds and campaign in public.

=== Participating parties ===
The following is a list of parties which are registered as participants in the election by the Central Election Commission. 23 political parties were eligible to participate in the elections, having submitted their membership rolls before 10 April 2024, in compliance with legal requirements. 20 political parties registered for the elections before the deadline on 22 July 2024. Three parties, Together with the Vytis, Movement for Forests – Young Lithuania and Christian Union, withdrew from the race on their own accord. On 9 August 2024, 15 different electoral lists were registered. 1,740 candidates participated in the elections: 1,089 men and 651 women.

Party representatives drew their ballot numbers in a ceremony in Seimas Palace on 19 August 2024. Number of the People and Justice Union was drawn by the representative of the CEC, due to members failure to participate in the event.

Nr.	Party / Electoral list		Abbr.	Leader		Ideology	Seats	
Nr.	Party / Electoral list		Abbr.	Party	Electoral list	Ideology	Last election	In 2024 (Note: Four seats were vacant.)
1	People and Justice Union; Tautos ir teisingumo sąjunga		TTS	Petras Gražulis	Artūras Orlauskas	National conservatism Euroscepticism	0 / 141	0 / 137
2	National Alliance; Nacionalinis susivienijimas		NS	Vytautas Radžvilas	Vytautas Sinica	Christian conservatism National conservatism	0 / 141	0 / 137
3	Social Democratic Party of Lithuania; Lietuvos socialdemokratų partija		LSDP	Vilija Blinkevičiūtė		Social democracy	13 / 141	14 / 137
4	Lithuanian Green Party; Lietuvos žaliųjų partija		LŽP	Ieva Budraitė		Green liberalism	1 / 141	0 / 137
5	Lithuanian People's Party; Lietuvos liaudies partija		LLP	Tauras Jakelaitis	Eduardas Vaitkus	Russophilia; Hard Euroscepticism	0 / 141	0 / 137
6	Lithuanian Regions Party; Lietuvos regionų partija		LRP	Jonas Pinskus		Social democracy Regionalism; Social conservatism	3 / 141	9 / 137
8	Lithuanian Farmers and Greens Union (Note: The party ran as a joint list with several politicians from the parties Young Lithuania and Lithuania - For Everyone, as well as the team of presidential candidate Ignas Vėgėlė. This electoral list will be subject to a 7% coalition barrier.); Lietuvos valstiečių ir žaliųjų sąjunga		LVŽS	Ramūnas Karbauskis	Aurelijus Veryga	Agrarianism; Social conservatism Left-wing populism	32 / 141	17 / 137
9 (Note: Number nine drawn by the Labour Party was selected; Numbers seven and fifteen, drawn by the LKDP and ŽP respectively, were discarded.)	Coalition of Peace; Taikos koalicija	Labour Party	DP	Viktor Uspaskich	Viktor Uspaskich	Populism	10 / 141	0 / 137
9	Coalition of Peace; Taikos koalicija	Lithuanian Christian Democracy Party	LKDP	Mindaugas Puidokas	Viktor Uspaskich	Christian right	did not participate	1 / 137
9	Coalition of Peace; Taikos koalicija	Samogitian Party	ŽP	Irena Stražinskaitė-Glinskienė	Viktor Uspaskich	Regionalism	did not participate	0 / 137
10	Freedom and Justice; Laisvė ir teisingumas		PLT	Artūras Zuokas		Conservative liberalism National liberalism	1 / 141	0 / 137
11	Union of Democrats "For Lithuania"; Demokratų sąjunga "Vardan Lietuvos"		DSVL	Saulius Skvernelis		Green conservatism Social democracy	split from LVŽS	16 / 137
12	Dawn of Nemunas; Nemuno Aušra		PPNA	Remigijus Žemaitaitis		Populism; Nationalism	split from PLT	3 / 137
13	Homeland Union – Lithuanian Christian Democrats; Tėvynės sąjunga – Lietuvos krikščionys demokratai		TS–LKD	Gabrielius Landsbergis	Ingrida Šimonytė	Liberal conservatism Christian democracy	50 / 141	49 / 137
14	Liberals' Movement; Liberalų sąjūdis		LS	Viktorija Čmilytė-Nielsen		Classical liberalism	13 / 141	13 / 137
16	Freedom Party; Laisvės partija		LP	Aušrinė Armonaitė		Liberalism	11 / 141	10 / 137
17	Electoral Action of Poles in Lithuania – Christian Families Alliance; Lietuvos lenkų rinkimų akcija – Krikščioniškų šeimų sąjunga		LLRA-KŠS	Waldemar Tomaszewski		Polish interests Social conservatism	3 / 141	2 / 137

=== Debates ===
==== Television debates ====
The Lithuanian public broadcaster LRT hosted six televised debate shows, organized together with the Central Electoral Commission (CEC). According to the CEC these were to be divided into two rounds of three debate shows. Each debate included five parties (or electoral lists), and was broadcast on TV and online starting at 9:00 PM. The moderators were LRT journalists Deividas Jursevičius, Rasa Tapinienė, and Nemira Pumprickaitė.

Date	Organiser	Moderator	Subjects	Participants														
Date	Organiser	Moderator	Subjects	P Present (list leader) I Invitee N Non-invitee S Surrogate														
Date	Organiser	Moderator	Subjects	TS–LKD	LSDP	NA	LVŽS	LS	DSVL	LP	LLRA-KŠS	NS	LLP	LRP	TK	LŽP	TTS	PLT
9 September	TV3	Edmundas Jakilaitis	Social security, Health	P Šimonytė	P Blinkevičiūtė	P Žemaitaitis	P Veryga	P Čmilytė-Nielsen	P Skvernelis	N	N	N	N	N	N	N	N	N
16 September	TV3	Edmundas Jakilaitis	National security	P Šimonytė	S Šakalienė	P Žemaitaitis	S Gaižauskas	P Čmilytė-Nielsen	P Skvernelis	N	N	N	N	N	N	N	N	N
23 September	TV3	Edmundas Jakilaitis	Economy, tax policy, energy policy	S Skaistė	S Paluckas	P Žemaitaitis	S Vėgėlė	S Gentvilas	S Sinkevčius	N	N	N	N	N	N	N	N	N
23 September	LRT	Deividas Jursevičius	Economy, tax policy, defence, foreign policy	N	P Blinkevičiūtė	N	P Veryga	P Čmilytė-Nielsen	P Skvernelis	N	N	N	N	N	N	P Budraitė	N	N
24 September	LRT	Nemira Pumprickaitė	Economy, tax policy, defence, foreign policy	P Šimonytė	N	P Žemaitaitis	N	N	N	N	P Tomaszewski	N	P Vaitkus	N	N	N	N	P Zuokas
25 September	LRT	Rasa Tapinienė	Economy, tax policy, defence, foreign policy	N	N	N	N	N	N	P Armonaitė	N	P Sinica	N	P Pinskus	P Uspaskich	N	P Orlauskas	N
30 September	TV3	Edmundas Jakilaitis	Education, human rights, social policy	S Morkūnaitė-Mikulėnienė	P Blinkevičiūtė	P Žemaitaitis	P Veryga	P Čmilytė-Nielsen	P Skvernelis	N	N	N	N	N	N	N	N	N
7 October	TV3	Edmundas Jakilaitis	Transport policy, agriculture, environment protection	S Starkevičius	S Paluckas	P Žemaitaitis	S Vėgėlė	P Čmilytė-Nielsen	P Skvernelis	N	N	N	N	N	N	N	N	N
7 October	LRT	Deividas Jursevičius	Health, education, culture policy, human rights	N	N	N	N	N	N	P Armonaitė	P Tomaszewski	N	P Vaitkus	N	S Puidokas	N	P Orlauskas	N
8 October	LRT	Nemira Pumprickaitė	Health, education, culture policy, human rights	N	P Blinkevičiūtė	N	P Veryga	P Čmilytė-Nielsen	P Skvernelis	N	N	N	N	N	N	P Budraitė	N	N
9 October	LRT	Rasa Tapinienė	Health, education, culture policy, human rights	P Šimonytė	N	P Žemaitaitis	N	N	N	N	N	P Sinica	N	P Pinskus	N	N	N	P Zuokas
10 October	Delfi TV	Rasa Lukaitytė-Vnarauskienė	General	S Kasčiūnas	S Paluckas	P Žemaitaitis	S Karbauskis	P Čmilytė-Nielsen	P Skvernelis	P Armonaitė	N	N	N	N	N	N	N	N
12 October	TV3	Edmundas Jakilaitis	Final debate before the first round	P Šimonytė	P Blinkevičiūtė	P Žemaitaitis	P Veryga	P Čmilytė-Nielsen	P Skvernelis	N	N	N	N	N	N	N	N	N
21 October	TV3	Edmundas Jakilaitis	Defence, security, tax policy	S Kasčiūnas	S Paluckas	P Žemaitaitis	S Surplys	P Čmilytė-Nielsen	P Skvernelis	N	N	N	N	N	N	N	N	N

==== Radio debates ====
Seven radio debates, hosted by LRT Radijas, were organized along similar lines. Each radio debate included representatives of two or three parties, and was broadcast on FM radio and the LRT website starting at 9:05 AM. Four radio debates dedicated specifically to cultural issues were hosted by LRT Klasika starting at 11:05 AM. Representatives from three or four parties were invited to participate in each of these debates.

Date	Radio programme	Host(s)	Participants														
Date	Radio programme	Host(s)	P Present (list leader) I Invitee N Non-invitee S Surrogate														
Date	Radio programme	Host(s)	TS–LKD	LSDP	NA	LVŽS	LS	DSVL	LP	LLRA-KŠS	NS	LLP	LRP	TK	LŽP	TTS	PLT
17 September	LRT Klasika	Marius Eidukonis, Monika Gimbutaitė	S Juozapaitis	S Olekas	N	N	S Kairys	N	N	N	PSinica	N	N	N	N	N	N
24 September	LRT Klasika	Marius Eidukonis, Monika Gimbutaitė	N	N	N	N	N	N	N	S Tamašunienė	N	PVaitkus	S Valungevičienė	N	N	S Dagys	N
30 September	LRT Radijas	Agnė Skamarakaitė	S Morkūnaitė-Mikulėnienė	S Rasa Budbergytė	N	N	N	N	N	N	N	N	N	S Puidokas	N	N	N
1 October	LRT Radijas	Marius Jokūbaitis	N	N	N	N	N	N	N	N	P Sinica	P Vaitkus	N	N	N	N	N
1 October	LRT Klasika	Marius Eidukonis, Monika Gimbutaitė	N	N	SŠirinskienė	N	N	N	N	N	N	N	N	N	PBudraitė	N	S Babravičius
2 October	LRT Radijas	Liepa Želnienė	N	N	N	N	N	SKukuraitis	P Armonaitė	N	N	N	N	N	N	N	N
3 October	LRT Radijas	Agnė Skamarakaitė	N	N	P Žemaitaitis	N	N	N	N	S Narkevič	N	N	N	N	N	N	N
4 October	LRT Radijas	Liepa Želnienė	N	N	N	P Veryga	SGentvilas	N	N	N	N	N	N	N	N	N	N
7 October	LRT Radijas	Liepa Želnienė	N	N	N	N	N	N	N	N	N	N	N	N	PBudraitė	N	S Jankauskaitė-Milčiuvienė
8 October	LRT Radijas	Marius Jokūbaitis	N	N	N	N	N	N	N	N	N	N	P Pinskus	N	N	S Puteikis	N
8 October	LRT Klasika	Marius Eidukonis, Monika Gimbutaitė	N	N	N	S Vasiliauskas	N	S Pikžirnis	S Pakarklytė	N	N	N	N	S Puidokas	N	N	N

==== Other debates ====
The youth initiative "Žinau, ką renku" (lit. 'I know who I'm voting for') hosted a live debate in cooperation with LRT, which was held on 11 October at 8:00 PM in the courtyard of Lukiškės Prison. All of the leaders of the 15 parties were invited. This youth initiative also hosted individual debates for all 71 single-seat constituencies, which were broadcast on the LRT website.

After the first round of voting on 13 October, 63 of the 71 single-member constituencies remained contested between the top two candidates. Prior to the run-off elections on 27 October to determine the final winners, debates between the run-off candidates were filmed for each of these 63 districts and broadcast on the 15min, TV3, Delfi and Lrytas news portals, as well as the website rinkimai2024.lt. These debates were filmed from 16 to 21 October in the studios of Delfi and Laisvės TV.

== Politicians not running ==
Nine incumbent members of Seimas chose to not run in the elections:

- Sergejus Jovaiša (TS-LKD)
- Algis Strelčiūnas (TS-LKD)
- Jurgita Šiugždinienė (TS-LKD)
- Monika Navickienė (TS-LKD)
- Liudas Jonaitis (LSDP)
- Vidmantas Kanopa (LSDP)
- Vigilijus Jukna (LSDP)
- Ieva Kačinskaitė-Urbonienė (DP)
- Andrius Mazuronis (DP)

== Opinion polls ==
LOESS curve of the polling for the 2024 Lithuanian parliamentary election.

Parliamentary election poll results are listed in the table below in reverse chronological order. The highest percentage figure in each poll is displayed in bold, and its background is shaded in the leading party's colour. The "Lead" column shows the percentage point difference between the two parties with the highest figures.

Pollster	Fieldwork dates	Sample size	TS–LKD	LVŽS	DP	LSDP	LP	LS	LLRA− KŠS	LRP	TTS	PLT	DSVL	PPNA	NS	Lead
Spinter tyrimai	16–25 September 2024 (Note: Lithuanian Green Party 3.7%)	1,008	18.0	10.1	−	**24.1**	7.0	9.8	−	−	−	−	8.1	16.0	3.1	**6.1**
Vilmorus	13–21 September 2024 (Note: Lithuanian Green Party 1.1%)	1,000	13.3	9.1	2.7 (Note: Coalition of Peace (Labour Party, Lithuanian Christian Democracy Party, Samogitian Party))	**26.4**	3.3	7.5	1.9	4.0	0.7	1.9	9.5	16.7	1.1	**9.7**
Baltijos tyrimai	6–20 September 2024 (Note: Lithuanian Green Party 2.0%)	1,004	16.7	11.4	2.0 (Note: Coalition of Peace (Labour Party, Lithuanian Christian Democracy Party, Samogitian Party))	**22.2**	3.0	5.6	1.7	5.3	1.3	1.2	13.8	11.6	1.5	**5.5**
Baltijos tyrimai	7–9 August 2024 (Note: Lithuanian Green Party 1.4%)	1,005	12.5	11.6	7.7	**21.9**	3.4	5.7	2.6	4.3	2.0	2.0	12.8	11.1	0.9	**9.1**
Spinter tyrimai	19–29 July 2024	1,007	16.8	13.3	3.5	**21.5**	5.3	10.7	−	−	−	−	11.8	17.0	−	**4.5**
Vilmorus	11–21 July 2024	1,000	15.7	13.8	4.3	**26.4**	4.3	7.1	1.7	4.8	–	–	10.2	9.9	–	**10.7**
Baltijos tyrimai	21 June – 7 July 2024 (Note: Lithuanian Green Party 1.3%)	1,005	12.3	10.1	4.6	**23.2**	3.4	7.5	2.8	5.0	2.5	1.7	14.3	9.8	1.4	**8.9**
Spinter tyrimai	18–28 June 2024	1,013	15.6	8.8	3.2	**21.3**	6.0	9.1	−	−	−	−	8.9	13.4	−	**6.7**
2024 European elections	9 June 2024 (Note: Lithuanian Green Party 4.05%, Coalition of Peace (Lithuanian Christian Democracy Party–Samogitian Party) 3.51%, Christian Union 1.37%)	691,572	**21.33**	9.13	1.66	17.98	8.10	5.42	5.78	5.25	5.45	1.25	5.95	−	3.79	**3.35**
Spinter tyrimai	17–26 May 2024	1,016	16.4	9.2	2.9	**19.3**	6.3	9.2	−	−	−	−	9.1	13.0	2.9	**2.9**
Baltijos tyrimai	16–25 May 2024	1,027	13.6	12.6	8.0	**22.7**	3.4	4.4	3.4	5.5	1.9	2.5	10.8	9.9	1.1	**9.1**
Spinter tyrimai	17–25 April 2024	1,018	15.4	9.6	3.2	**20.4**	5.1	9.9	−	−	−	−	8.4	7.4	2.9	**5.0**
Spinter tyrimai	18–28 March 2024	1,009	13.7	11.3	3.6	**21.1**	7.3	9.6	−	−	−	−	7.8	5.6	3.9	**7.4**
Baltijos tyrimai	15–25 March 2024	1,115	11.8	15.4	7.4	**23.2**	2.6	6.5	2.8	5.2	−	2.8	12.1	6.5	−	**7.8**
Vilmorus	15–23 March 2024	1,001	11.0	14.8	7.0	**30.3**	4.1	9.4	2.3	5.2	−	−	14.3	−	−	**15.5**
Baltijos tyrimai	22 February – 5 March 2024	1,021	12.7	11.3	5.8	**22.3**	4.3	4.8	3.2	4.7	−	3.2	15.3	4.5	−	**7.0**
Spinter tyrimai	18–25 February 2024	1,017	15.3	10.0	4.5	**21.4**	5.4	8.4	−	−	−	−	8.0	6.4	−	**6.1**
Vilmorus	8–17 February 2024	1,002	17.6	13.6	7.3	**29.6**	2.5	7.0	1.7	5.1	−	−	13.6	−	−	**12.0**
Baltijos tyrimai	19–29 January 2024	1,021	12.0	13.7	7.4	**22.3**	4.8	5.8	−	5.2	−	4.1	13.7	2.7	−	**8.6**
Spinter tyrimai	19–26 January 2024	1,012	15.1	10.8	2.9	**22.9**	5.6	8.2	−	−	−	−	9.7	5.9	2.9	**7.8**
Baltijos tyrimai	15–30 December 2023	1,017	14.1	13.4	7.1	**21.0**	4.4	7.9	3.3	5.0	2.0	3.9	17.1		−	**3.9**
Spinter tyrimai	15–23 December 2023	1,012	15.9	13.8	3.2	**24.0**	3.8	9.1	2.9	2.9	−	3.8	8.9		2.2	**8.1**
Vilmorus	22 November – 2 December 2023	1,000	12.6	12.5	5.9	**32.7**	4.6	5.9	1.9	5.1	3.6	−	12.3		−	**20.1**
Spinter tyrimai	17–29 November 2023	1,015	15.4	12.7	−	**21.9**	5.2	10.5	3.2	4.1	−	4.0	6.3		−	**6.5**
Baltijos tyrimai	16–27 November 2023	1,018	11.5	15.5	7.0	**23.4**	2.8	8.4	2.8	5.7	2.8	−	14.8		−	**7.9**
Vilmorus	9–19 November 2023	1,000	12.6	12.1	4.4	**32.1**	3.0	9.0	2.0	3.6	3.7	4.2	10.6		−	**19.5**
Baltijos tyrimai	23 October – 7 November 2023	1,013	11.9	14.1	9.7	**25.9**	2.8	9.9	1.4	4.6	1.4	3.5	13.6		−	**11.8**
Spinter tyrimai	17–28 October 2023	1,011	16.3	10.0	−	**24.0**	5.4	11.4	5.2	3.2	−	3.4	8.5		−	**7.7**
Vilmorus	12–21 October 2023	1,003	15.0	11.8	4.6	**29.1**	3.8	7.6	2.5	3.8	4.3	3.3	12.1		1.4	**14.1**
Spinter tyrimai	18–26 September 2023	1,013	15.3	9.4	4.7	**22.8**	5.7	12.6	3.5	−	−	5.0	8.9		−	**7.5**
Vilmorus	14–23 September 2023	1,003	19.2	12.4	4.5	**31.9**	3.7	7.4	1.7	3.9	2.8	4.0	9.3		−	**14.7**
Baltijos tyrimai	24 August – 5 September 2023	1,016	12.5	12.8	7.5	**21.8**	3.9	9.5	2.9	3.5	1.2	5.0	18.9		−	**2.9**
Spinter tyrimai	20–29 July 2023	1,009	17.4	12.1	3.8	**19.6**	4.2	10.7	3.3	−	−	3.9	12.4		−	**2.2**
Vilmorus	17–19 July 2023	1,003	16.0	12.6	5.2	**31.0**	4.3	6.9	1.6	3.9	2.1	2.6	12.3		−	**15.0**
Spinter tyrimai	19–28 June 2023	1,012	12.8	9.7	4.0	**18.4**	7.0	11.5	3.2	−	−	5.8	11.4		−	**5.6**
Baltijos tyrimai	14–29 June 2023	1,020	11.8	11.5	7.8	**23.2**	3.5	9.0	4.2	5.5	2.8	2.9	18.6		−	**4.6**
Baltijos tyrimai	12–29 May 2023	1,009	11.2	13.0	6.2	**23.2**	4.1	9.5	4.3	2.7	0.9	5.0	19.1		−	**4.1**
Spinter tyrimai	19–26 May 2023	1,009	13.1	12.5	5.4	**20.7**	5.5	9.7	3.4	−	−	5.1	9.4		−	**7.6**
Vilmorus	17–21 May 2023	1,000	13.0	15.4	6.2	**29.8**	3.9	7.0	1.6	2.6	1.4	4.4	13.5		−	**14.4**
Baltijos tyrimai	20 April – 5 May 2023	1,026	13.4	9.7	9.1	**25.8**	3.5	9.7	3.4	2.3	1.9	3.2	17.2		−	**8.6**
Spinter tyrimai	18–27 April 2023	1,014	16.6	13.7	2.7	**23.5**	3.8	9.8	−	−	−	3.8	10.1		−	**6.7**
Vilmorus	14–22 April 2023	1,000	15.6	13.1	3.9	**28.8**	4.1	8.0	2.3	3.6	2.6	3.3	12.9		−	**13.2**
Spinter tyrimai	17–27 March 2023	1,016	16.5	12.0	3.0	**18.1**	5.8	9.5	−	−	−	6.1	11.5		−	**1.6**
Vilmorus	9–18 March 2023	1,000	15.1	14.0	4.3	**28.2**	3.9	7.1	2.0	2.8	3.2	4.2	13.4		−	**13.1**
2023 municipal elections	5 March 2023 (Note: Lithuanian Green Party 1.66%, Christian Union 0.52%, Young Lithuania 0.13%, Samogitian Party 0.06%)	1,169,174	16.2	9.2	3.67	**17.45**	3.55	6.95	5.33	2.47	2.6	0.92	6.68		1.12	**1.25**
Baltijos tyrimai	15–28 February 2023 (Note: Young Lithuania 0.9%, Christian Union 0.5%)	1,003	14.2	10.0	8.9	**18.3**	3.4	7.4	4.8	3.6	2.3	4.7	**18.3**		0.6	Tie
Spinter tyrimai	18–27 February 2023	1,012	16.7	12.3	5.5	**17.2**	5.8	7.8	−	−	−	3.9	13.9		−	**0.5**
Vilmorus	9–18 February 2023	1,000	16.1	14.9	5.1	**24.4**	5.1	5.3	1.7	3.5	2.4	3.8	16.2		−	**8.2**
Baltijos tyrimai	19–31 January 2023 (Note: Young Lithuania 2.0%, Christian Union 0.5%)	1,023	15.7	9.7	7.9	19.4	3.6	7.1	2.8	2.8	1.4	3.7	**19.8**		0.1	**0.4**
Spinter tyrimai	18–27 January 2023	1,010	16.4	13.1	4.6	**17.6**	6.8	8.9	−	−	−	3.0	17.3		−	**0.3**
Spinter tyrimai	15–24 December 2022	1,010	**19.8**	8.8	3.0	17.8	4.5	8.6	−	−	−	3.9	14.5		−	**2.0**
Vilmorus	8–15 December 2022	1,000	16.7	12.7	6.0	**25.0**	3.6	9.3	1.8	2.7	1.9	3.4	15.3		−	**8.3**
Baltijos tyrimai	17 November – 2 December 2022 (Note: Lithuanian Green Party 2.4%, Young Lithuania 1.2%, Christian Union 0.6%)	1,026	12.2	11.3	7.3	16.2	3.8	9.5	3.0	2.6	2.1	8.6	**18.9**		0.3	**2.7**
Spinter tyrimai	18–29 November 2022	1,013	**18.8**	12.5	3.6	16.9	4.1	8.3	−	−	−	5.0	12.1		−	**1.9**
Vilmorus	10–19 November 2022	1,000	17.1	10.5	5.6	**24.3**	2.5	8.1	2.9	3.4	1.2	9.5	13.1		−	**7.2**
Baltijos tyrimai	26 October – 8 November 2022 (Note: Lithuanian Green Party 2.4%)	1,026	15.7	12.4	8.0	**17.7**	3.7	7.5	2.6	3.2	2.2	8.0	16.1		−	**1.6**
Spinter tyrimai	18–28 October 2022	1,011	**21.5**	10.4	3.6	17.8	5.4	8.8	−	−	−	8.0	11.2		−	**3.7**
Vilmorus	11–16 October 2022	1,002	18.7	10.1	5.8	**23.7**	2.7	8.6	1.4	4.4	1.9	7.5	11.4		−	**3.5**
Spinter tyrimai	20–30 September 2022	1,010	**18.7**	10.1	5.8	17.6	6.1	9.7	−	−	−	7.5	10.1		−	**1.1**
Baltijos tyrimai	16–27 September 2022 (Note: Lithuanian Green Party 2.4%)	1,024	13.4	10.6	8.3	**20.0**	3.6	7.0	4.2	3.4	2.4	8.9	15.7		−	**4.3**
Vilmorus	15–24 September 2022	1,000	18.9	11.6	5.9	**22.4**	2.8	6.4	1.9	5.4	2.8	8.6	12.3		−	**2.5**
Spinter tyrimai	25 August – 2 September 2022	1,006	**19.1**	10.8	3.6	12.7	7.8	9.8	−	−	−	6.4	14.5		−	**4.6**
Baltijos tyrimai	August 2022 (Note: Lithuanian Green Party 1.6%)	–	15.0	10.6	6.4	18.3	3.1	9.4	2.7	2.2	1.1	8.7	**20.1**		−	**1.8**
Baltijos tyrimai	12–28 July 2022	1,021	15.8	7.4	6.5	**20.0**	2.5	9.9	3.3	2.2	1.8	12.7	16.9		−	**3.1**
Spinter tyrimai	18–28 July 2022	1,013	**16.5**	10.9	3.6	14.8	6.6	9.4	−	−	−	7.0	**16.5**		−	Tie
Vilmorus	15–23 July 2022	1,003	17.4	11.6	6.1	**20.8**	3.9	8.7	1.3	3.6	1.8	6.8	16.2		−	**3.4**
Spinter tyrimai	18–28 June 2022	1,015	**19.7**	9.5	4.2	16.4	5.2	8.0	−	−	−	7.5	17.0		−	**2.7**
Vilmorus	9–18 June 2022	1,003	18.1	11.5	4.7	**22.5**	4.2	7.6	1.1	4.3	2.2	8.1	14.7		−	**4.4**
Baltijos tyrimai	16–28 May 2022	1,021	15.4	7.3	6.8	17.1	3.7	8.5	2.9	2.5	3.0	10.7	**20.9**		−	**3.8**
Spinter tyrimai	18–27 May 2022	1,013	**20.3**	8.6	5.1	18.7	6.5	8.1	–	–	–	6.8	12.8		−	**1.6**
Vilmorus	12–18 May 2022	1,001	19.9	9.1	6.1	**25.8**	4.3	8.7	1.6	2.5	2.5	–	19.1		−	**5.9**
Spinter tyrimai	20–28 April 2022	1,007	**20.1**	10.2	6.1	13.9	6.5	9.3	–	–	–	6.4	14.8		−	**5.3**
Baltijos tyrimai	13–27 April 2022	1,009	14.7	6.6	6.3	19.0	2.9	9.5	3.8	1.0	1.0	10.7	**22.0**		−	**3.0**
Open Agency/Norstat	15–22 April 2022 (Note: Lithuanian Green Party 0.9%)	1,000	**23.4**	11.8	4.5	16.6	6.5	7.1	2.5	1.3	2.0	5.5	12.4		−	**6.8**
Spinter tyrimai	17–25 March 2022	1,007	**19.3**	9.7	6.2	15.1	5.5	8.9	–	–	–	6.9	15.8		−	**3.5**
Baltijos tyrimai	10–24 March 2022	1,000	13.3	7.5	7.7	18.0	4.2	10.7	5.0	2.1	0.9	9.8	**18.8**		−	**0.8**
Vilmorus	10–19 March 2022	1,005	19.0	10.7	6.9	**23.0**	2.3	8.2	1.3	4.0	3.5	–	19.8		−	**3.2**
Baltijos tyrimai	22 February – 3 March 2022	1,017	16.6	8.7	8.8	17.1	4.1	9.5	3.7	1.4	0.7	8.8	**19.5**		−	**2.4**
Spinter tyrimai	17–25 February 2022	1,010	17.3	9.6	9.4	**17.6**	6.5	8.6	–	–	–	5.9	12.5		−	**0.3**
Vilmorus	3–8 February 2022	1,005	15.8	12.8	8.6	**26.9**	3.2	7.7	1.5	3.6	–	–	17.8		−	**9.1**
Baltijos tyrimai	24 January – 4 February 2022	1,022	11.9	13.4	13.4	**23.9**	4.5	10.5	4.5	1.5	1.5	11.9	–		−	**13.5**
Spinter tyrimai	17–29 January 2022	1,010	**16.9**	11.2	8.7	14.9	7.9	9.6	–	–	–	5.8	11.9		−	**2.0**
Spinter tyrimai	13–25 December 2021	1,012	17.0	10.6	6.6	**17.2**	7.4	11.3	–	–	–	5.7	11.3		−	**0.2**
Open Agency/Norstat	10–18 December 2021 (Note: Lithuanian Green Party 0.9%, hypothetically parties: United Lithuania 2.9%, Second Lithuania 1.3%, Lithuanian Family Movement 1.3%)	1,002	**24.6**	8.9	7.5	17.8	4.6	9.8	2.4	–	0.9	4.9	10.5		1.7	**6.8**
Vilmorus	10–18 December 2021	1,000	17.5	13.7	9.9	**32.0**	3.8	10.9	1.2	5.5	–	–			−	**14.5**
Baltijos tyrimai	16 November – 2 December 2021	1,009	15.5	15.0	7.8	**25.7**	4.1	11.2	3.3	2.6	2.6	10.1			–	**10.2**
Spinter tyrimai	11–28 November 2021	1,015	16.5	13.4	9.0	**19.4**	8.0	9.0	–	3.0	–	5.0			–	**2.9**
Vilmorus	18–27 November 2021	1,000	19.3	17.6	8.7	**27.3**	4.7	9.4	3.2	4.5	–	–			−	**8.0**
Baltijos tyrimai	17 October – 5 November 2021	1,004	14.1	14.1	10.3	**26.7**	3.1	10.9	4.3	2.0	2.3	10.4			–	**12.7**
Spinter tyrimai	18–28 October 2021	1,015	17.4	13.2	9.8	**19.5**	7.4	11.4	–	–	–	4.4			–	**2.1**
Vilmorus	15–22 October 2021	1,000	16.7	16.1	9.8	**28.9**	4.6	10.8	2.2	5.2	–	–			–	**12.2**
Baltijos tyrimai	17 September – 3 October 2021	1,004	15.5	15.1	7.8	**25.7**	4.1	11.2	3.4	2.7	2.7	10.2			–	**10.2**
Spinter tyrimai	17–26 September 2021	1,009	18.6	13.8	9.4	**21.2**	8.0	10.1	–	3.0	–	–			–	**2.6**
Vilmorus	9–16 September 2021	1,003	21.6	17.4	9.4	**29.6**	3.0	10.1	2.0	2.5	–	–			−	**8.0**
Spinter tyrimai	24–31 August 2021	1,014	**18.9**	17.3	9.5	18.6	8.3	10.9	–	4.5	–	–			–	**0.3**
Baltijos tyrimai	20–31 August 2021	1,006	15.7	17.3	7.4	**25.9**	5.0	9.1	5.5	2.5	–	8.6			–	**8.6**
Vilmorus	29 July – 5 August 2021	1,000	19.5	23.2	8.7	**23.6**	4.4	8.1	2.6	4.0	–	–			−	**0.4**
Spinter tyrimai	17–28 June 2021	1,003	20.8	**22.8**	6.3	15.3	8.5	10.9	2.7	–	–	–			−	**2.0**
Vilmorus	9–18 June 2021	1,000	20.2	**25.9**	8.9	22.8	5.0	10.3	1.4	3.4	–	–			−	**5.7**
Baltijos tyrimai	20 May – 2 June 2021	1,018	17.3	**22.0**	11.9	20.0	5.4	12.9	4.9	–	–	5.1			−	**2.0**
Spinter tyrimai	18–28 May 2021	1,011	**23.0**	22.0	7.6	10.9	8.6	12.6	2.7	–	–	–			−	**1.0**
Vilmorus	11–21 May 2021	1,004	24.5	**26.8**	7.3	16.9	5.8	10.2	2.1	5.1	–	–			−	**2.3**
Spinter tyrimai	19–28 April 2021	1,006	**23.7**	23.1	7.4	8.2	9.0	12.5	3.6	–	–	–			–	**0.6**
Vilmorus	8–17 April 2021	1,001	**29.2**	26.5	6.7	11.7	6.9	9.1	1.0	7.0	–	–			−	**2.7**
Spinter tyrimai	17–23 March 2021	1,011	**23.5**	21.1	7.4	8.6	9.8	12.8	3.9	–	–	3.0			–	**2.4**
Spinter tyrimai	17–26 February 2021	1,014	**25.6**	18.3	5.8	6.5	11.8	12.9	4.5	–	–	4.3			–	**7.3**
Spinter tyrimai	18–27 January 2021	1,013	**27.2**	16.1	6	8.5	11.8	12.6	4.2	–	–	2.4			–	**11.1**
Spinter tyrimai	10–20 December 2020	1,007	**23.3**	19.7	8.1	7.8	11.7	12.1	4.6	–	–	–			–	**3.6**
Baltijos tyrimai	6–30 November 2020	1,004	**22.7**	19.0	10.5	9.4	11.3	12.9	4.7	1.9	2.5	4.2			−	**3.7**
2020 parliamentary election		1,174,843	25.77	18.07	9.77	9.59	9.45	7.05	4.97	3.28	2.36	2.06			2.21	7.7

== Results ==
The results of the first round were confirmed on 20 October 2024.

Party or alliance		Proportional			Constituency (first round)			Constituency (second round)			Total seats	+/–
Party or alliance		Votes	%	Seats	Votes	%	Seats	Votes	%	Seats	Total seats	+/–
Social Democratic Party of Lithuania		240,503	19.70	18	225,638	18.84	2	290,419	34.29	32	52	+39
Homeland Union – Lithuanian Christian Democrats		224,026	18.35	17	231,394	19.32	1	210,964	24.91	10	28	–22
Dawn of Nemunas		186,305	15.26	14	129,641	10.82	1	77,508	9.15	5	20	New
Union of Democrats "For Lithuania"		114,792	9.40	8	105,330	8.79	0	64,013	7.56	6	14	New
Liberals' Movement		95,868	7.85	7	108,493	9.06	1	56,447	6.67	4	12	–1
Lithuanian Farmers and Greens Union (Note: The party ran as a joint list with several politicians from the parties Young Lithuania and Lithuania – For Everyone, as well as the team of presidential candidate Ignas Vėgėlė.)		87,374	7.16	6	115,083	9.61	0	53,264	6.29	2	8	–24
Freedom Party		56,379	4.62	0	54,356	4.54	0	21,539	2.54	0	0	–11
Electoral Action of Poles in Lithuania		48,288	3.96	0	51,057	4.26	2	19,042	2.25	1	3	0
National Alliance		35,726	2.93	0	24,080	2.01	0	7,860	0.93	1	1	+1
Lithuanian People's Party		32,813	2.69	0	5,223	0.44	0				0	0
Coalition of Peace	Labour Party	27,362	2.24	0	16,055	1.34	0				0	–10
Coalition of Peace	Lithuanian Christian Democracy Party	27,362	2.24	0	7,667	0.64	0				0	New
Coalition of Peace	Samogitian Party	27,362	2.24	0	3,080	0.26	0				0	New
Lithuanian Regions Party		23,547	1.93	0	40,008	3.34	0	17,253	2.04	0	0	–3
Lithuanian Green Party		21,002	1.72	0	22,182	1.85	0				0	–1
People and Justice Union		17,218	1.41	0	21,914	1.83	0				0	0
Freedom and Justice Party		9,367	0.77	0	10,484	0.88	0	11,531	1.36	1	1	0
Independents					26,044	2.17	1	17,025	2.01	1	2	–2
Total		1,220,570	100.00	70	1,197,729	100.00	8	846,865	100.00	63	141	0
Valid votes		1,220,570	98.07		1,197,729	96.28		846,865	96.39			
Invalid/blank votes		24,047	1.93		46,321	3.72		31,745	3.61			
Total votes		1,244,617	100.00		1,244,050	100.00		878,610	100.00			
Registered voters/turnout		2,384,368	52.20		2,384,368	52.18		2,121,562	41.41			
Source: VRK

Popular vote
LSDP	19.32%
TS-LKD	18.00%
PPNA	14.97%
DSVL	9.22%
LS	7.70%
LVŽS	7.02%
LP	4.53%
LLRA-KŠS	3.88%
Others	15.36%

Parliamentary seats
LSDP	36.88%
TS-LKD	19.86%
PPNA	14.18%
DSVL	9.83%
LS	8.51%
LVŽS	5.67%
LLRA-KŠS	2.13%
Independents	1.42%
NS	0.71%
PLT	0.71%

Candidates advancing to the second round in each constituency

Single-member constituencies – seats won in the first round

Results after the first round

Single-member constituencies – seats won in the second round

Results after the second round

=== Turnout ===
Early voting was held from 8–12 October, with turnout recorded at 11.75%. Final turnout following the first round was at 52.2%, an increase from the 47.2% recorded in 2020.

First round turnout by hour
8:00	9:00	10:00	11:00	12:00	13:00	14:00	15:00	16:00	17:00	18:00	19:00	20:00	Total
0.53%	1.82%	4.61%	9.01%	13.84%	18.32%	22.40%	26.10%	29.47%	32.69%	35.78%	38.61%	40.31%	52.20%

Second round turnout by hour
8:00	9:00	10:00	11:00	12:00	13:00	14:00	15:00	16:00	17:00	18:00	19:00	20:00	Total
0.60%	2.15%	5.08%	8.91%	12.66%	15.91%	18.82%	21.40%	23.75%	26.05%	28.11%	29.62%	30.52%	41.04%

=== Elected members ===
==== By constituency ====
Constituency		Last elections	Result	
Constituency		Last elections	Elected member	Winning party
1.	Senamiestis–Žvėrynas	Viktorija Čmilytė-Nielsen		LS hold
2.	Naujamiestis–Vilkpėdė	Žygimantas Pavilionis		TS-LKD hold
3.	Antakalnis	Ingrida Šimonytė		TS-LKD hold
4.	Žirmūnai	Paulė Kuzmickienė		TS-LKD hold
5.	Fabijoniškės	Aistė Gedvilienė	Remigijus Motuzas	LSDP gain from TS-LKD
6.	Šeškinė–Šnipiškės	Mindaugas Lingė		TS-LKD hold
7.	Justiniškės–Viršuliškės	Paulius Saudargas	Linas Kukuraitis	DSVL gain from TS-LKD
8.	Pilaitė–Karoliniškės	Radvilė Morkūnaitė-Mikulėnienė	Vytautas Sinica	NS gain from TS-LKD
9.	Lazdynai	Algis Strelčiūnas	Laurynas Kasčiūnas	TS-LKD hold
10.	Naujoji Vilnia	Monika Navickienė	Liutauras Kazlavickas	TS-LKD hold
11.	South Vilnius	Agnė Bilotaitė	Česlav Olševski	LLRA-KŠS gain from TS-LKD
12.	Verkiai	Dainius Kreivys		TS-LKD hold
13.	Pašilaičiai	Vytautas Kernagis	Eugenijus Gentvilas	LS gain from TS-LKD
14.	Naujininkai–Rasos	new	Artūras Zuokas	PLT wins
15.	Kalniečiai	Arvydas Anušauskas		TS-LKD hold
16.	Savanoriai	Marius Matijošaitis	Orinta Leiputė	LSDP gain from LP
17.	Petrašiūnai–Gričiupis	Kazys Starkevičius	Darius Razmislevičius	LSDP gain from TS-LKD
18.	Panemunė	Gintarė Skaistė	Audrius Radvilavičius	LSDP gain from TS-LKD
19.	Aleksotas–Vilijampolė	Vytautas Juozapaitis	Robertas Kaunas	LSDP gain from TS-LKD
20.	Centras–Žaliakalnis	Gabrielius Landsbergis	Simonas Kairys	LS gain from TS-LKD
21.	Šilainiai	Jurgita Šiugždinienė	Laurynas Šedvydis	LSDP gain from TS-LKD
22.	Pajūris (Curonian Spit–West Klaipėda)	Simonas Gentvilas	Daiva Petkevičienė	PPNA gain from LS
23.	Danė (North Klaipėda)	Arvydas Pocius	Audrius Petrošius	TS-LKD hold
24.	Baltija (Central Klaipėda)	Audrius Petrošius	Vytautas Grubliauskas	LSDP gain from TS-LKD
25.	Marios (South Klaipėda)	Ligita Girskienė		LVŽS hold
26.	Saulė (South Šiauliai)	Domas Griškevičius		DSVL, formerly Independent
27.	Aušra (North Šiauliai)	Stasys Tumėnas	Roma Janušonienė	LSDP gain from LVŽS
28.	Nevėžis (North Panevėžys)	Bronislovas Matelis	Ramūnas Vyžintas	LSDP gain from TS-LKD
29.	West Panevėžys	Deividas Labanavičius	Andrius Busila	LSDP gain from LVŽS
30.	Alytus	Vytautas Bakas	Jurgita Šukevičienė	LSDP gain from Independent
31.	Gargždai	Petras Gražulis	Alvydas Mockus	LSDP gain from Independent
32.	Šilutė	Zigmantas Balčytis	Daiva Žebelienė	PPNA gain from LRP
33.	Aukštaitija (Panevėžys District)	Guoda Burokienė	Modesta Petrauskaitė	LSDP gain from LVŽS
34.	Tauragė	Romualdas Vaitkus	Tadas Sadauskis	PPNA gain from LS
35.	Plungė–Rietavas	Jonas Varkalys	Tomas Domarkas	PPNA gain from LS
36.	Mėguva (Palanga)	Mindaugas Skritulskas	Karolis Neimantas	PPNA gain from TS-LKD
37.	Kuršas (Kretinga–Skuodas)	Antanas Vinkus	Violeta Turauskaitė	LSDP gain from LVŽS
38.	Mažeikiai	Laima Nagienė	Ingrida Braziulienė	LSDP gain from LVŽS
39.	North Samogitia (Naujoji Akmenė)	Valius Ąžuolas	Tomas Martinaitis	LSDP gain from LVŽS
40.	Telšiai	Valentinas Bukauskas	Agnė Jakavičiūtė-Miliauskienė	DSVL gain from DP
41.	Kelmė–Šilalė	Remigijus Žemaitaitis		PPNA, formerly PLT
42.	Raseiniai–Josvainiai	Matas Skamarakas		LSDP hold
43.	Kėdainiai	Tomas Bičiūnas	Viktoras Fiodorovas	Independent gain from LSDP
44.	Radviliškis–Tytuvėnai	Antanas Čepononis	Saulius Luščikas	LSDP gain from TS-LKD
45.	Šiauliai District	Rima Baškienė	Eimantas Kirkutis	LVŽS hold
46.	West Žiemgala (Joniškis)	Liudas Jonaitis	Vaida Aleknavičienė	LSDP hold
47.	East Žiemgala (Pakruojis–Pasvalys)	Antanas Matulas	Ilona Gelažnikienė	LSDP gain from TS-LKD
48.	West Sėla (Biržai–Kupiškis)	Valdemaras Valkiūnas	Lilija Vaitiekūnienė	LSDP gain from Independent
49.	North Deltuva (Anykščiai)	Tomas Tomilinas	Arūnas Dudėnas	LSDP gain from LVŽS
50.	East Sėla (Rokiškis–Zarasai)	Vidmantas Kanopa	Tadas Barauskas	LSDP hold
51.	Utena	Edmundas Pupinis	Vitalijus Šeršniovas	Independent gain from TS-LKD
52.	North Nalšia (Ignalina–Visaginas)	Algimantas Dumbrava	Jevgenij Šuklin	LS gain from LVŽS
53.	South Nalšia (Molėtai–Švenčionys)	Gintautas Kindurys	Šarūnas Birutis	LSDP gain from LVŽS
54.	Marijampolė	Andrius Vyšniauskas	Karolis Podolskis	LSDP gain from TS-LKD
55.	Riešė	Rita Tamašunienė	Daiva Ulbinaitė	TS-LKD gain from LLRA-KŠS
56.	Šalčininkai–Vilnius	Beata Petkevič	Jaroslav Narkevič	LLRA-KŠS hold
57.	Nemenčinė	Česlav Olševski	Rita Tamašunienė	LLRA-KŠS hold
58.	Trakai–Vievis	Kęstutis Vilkauskas		LSDP hold
59.	Kaišiadorys–Elektrėnai	Silva Lengvinienė	Algimantas Radvila	LSDP gain from LP
60.	Jonava	Eugenijus Sabutis		LSDP hold
61.	South Deltuva (Ukmergė–Širvintos)	Juozas Varžgalys	Indrė Kižienė	LSDP gain from LVŽS
62.	Karšuva (Pagėgiai–Jurbarkas)	Ričardas Juška		LS hold
63.	South Sūduva (Kalvarija–Simnas)	Kęstutis Mažeika		DSVL, formerly LVŽS
64.	North Sūduva (Šakiai–Kazlų Rūda)	Giedrius Surplys	Darius Jakavičius	LSDP gain from LVŽS
65.	Raudondvaris	Viktoras Pranckietis	Raminta Popovienė	LSDP gain from LS
66.	Garliava	Justinas Urbanavičius	Šarūnas Šukevičius	LSDP gain from TS-LKD
67.	Dainava (Prienai–Birštonas)	Andrius Palionis	Jūratė Zailskienė	LSDP gain from LRP
68.	Vilkaviškis	Algirdas Butkevičius		DSVL, formerly LŽP
69.	Dzūkija (Varėna)	Juozas Baublys	Martynas Katelynas	LSDP gain from LS
70.	Jotvingiai (Lazdijai–Druskininkai)	Zenonas Streikus	Linas Urmanavičius	DSVL gain from LVŽS
71.	Worldwide	Aušrinė Armonaitė	Dalia Asanavičiūtė	TS-LKD gain from LP

==== By proportional representation ====
Elected members in the multi-member constituency
LSDP	TS-LKD	Dawn of Nemunas
~~Vilija Blinkevičiūtė~~; Gintautas Paluckas; Juozas Olekas; Rasa Budbergytė; Inga Ruginienė; Algirdas Sysas; Dovilė Šakalienė; Laura Asadauskaitė; Julius Sabatauskas; Giedrius Drukteinis; Saulius Čaplinskas; Linas Jonauskas; Tadas Prajara; Rimantas Sinkevičius; Linas Balsys; Antanas Nedzinskas; Ruslanas Baranovas; Birutė Vėsaitė; Paulius Visockas	~~Gabrielius Landsbergis~~; Radvilė Morkūnaitė-Mikulėnienė; Gintarė Skaistė; Agnė Bilotaitė; Matas Maldeikis; Liudas Mažylis; Audronius Ažubalis; Jurgis Razma; Arūnas Valinskas; Vytautas Kernagis; Kazys Starkevičius; Raimondas Kuodis; Valdas Rakutis; Giedrė Balčytytė; Aistė Gedvilienė; Emanuelis Zingeris; Arvydas Pocius; Vytautas Juozapaitis	Agnė Širinskienė; Vytautas Jucius; Robert Puchovič; Artūras Skardžius; Aidas Gedvilas; Lina Šukytė-Korsakė; Kęstutis Bilius; Saulius Bucevičius; Mantas Poškus; Martynas Gedvilas; Petras Dargis; Raimondas Šukys; Dainius Varnas; Dainoras Bradauskas
DSVL	Liberals' Movement	LVŽS
Saulius Skvernelis; Lukas Savickas; Jekaterina Rojaka; ~~Virginijus Sinkevičius~~; Rima Baškienė; Tomas Tomilinas; Zigmantas Balčytis; Giedrimas Jeglinskas; Rūta Miliūtė	Virgilijus Alekna; Edita Rudelienė; Viktoras Pranckietis; Arminas Lydeka; Andrius Bagdonas; Vitalijus Gailius; Simonas Gentvilas	~~Aurelijus Veryga~~; Ignas Vėgėlė; Valius Ąžuolas; Bronis Ropė; Dainius Gaižauskas; Aušrinė Norkienė; Rimas Jonas Jankūnas

=== Preference votes ===
Alongside votes for a party, voters were able to cast a preferential votes for a candidate on the party list.

Party	Pos.	Candidate	Votes
TS–LKD	1	Ingrida Šimonytė	121,984
TS–LKD	3	Laurynas Kasčiūnas	97,008
LSDP	1	Vilija Blinkevičiūtė	91,526
PPNA	1	Remigijus Žemaitaitis	86,641
TS–LKD	2	Gabrielius Landsbergis	79,308
PPNA	2	Agnė Širinskienė	69,689
LSDP	2	Gintautas Paluckas	58,827
TS–LKD	4	Radvilė Morkūnaitė-Mikulėnienė	55,958
DSVL	1	Saulius Skvernelis	53,691
LS	1	Viktorija Čmilytė-Nielsen	50,465

== Aftermath ==
2024 Lithuanian parliamentary election map by electoral district (multi-mandate)

=== Government formation ===
On the night of 14 October, Vilija Blinkevičiūtė and Saulius Skvernelis, the leaders of the LSDP and the DSVL respectively, agreed to cooperate in the second round and to form a coalition government afterwards. LVŽS joined the agreement on 15 October. Despite the LSDP ruling out coalition with the PPNA, the latter party pledged to support Blinkevičiūtė becoming prime minister.

On 30 October, Blinkevičiūtė confirmed that she will not be prime minister and will continue to work as a member of the European Parliament, citing her age and health. Gintautas Paluckas became a candidate for prime minister.

On 7 November, the LSDP invited the DSVL and Dawn of Nemunas to form a ruling coalition, which would encompass 86 of the 141 seats in the Seimas. The inclusion of the Dawn of Nemunas party immediately provoked strong negative reactions both domestically and abroad. On 8 November, over 30 non-governmental organizations based in Lithuania signed an open letter against the decision, fearing a negative impact on human rights, democracy and national security, and US Senate Foreign Relations Committee chair Ben Cardin released a statement condemning the move. The same day, the New York Times also published a story about Dawn of Nemunas, focusing on Žemaitaitis' antisemitic statements. Further criticism came from German MPs Michael Roth (chair of the foreign affairs committee) and Roderich Kiesewetter (representative of the main opposition in the same committee), Polish senator Michał Kamiński, and the Israeli embassy.

On 9 November, Žemaitaitis claimed that the foreign reactions were instigated by his political opponents, and Paluckas similarly attributed them to opposing politicians' international connections. Paluckas stated that Žemaitaitis himself would not be offered a cabinet position. On 19 November, Lithuanian president Gitanas Nausėda nominated Paluckas for prime minister. His appointment was confirmed by the Seimas on 21 November, having received 84 votes against 36 negative votes and six abstentions.

=== Other changes ===
On the day after the second round of the election, Gabrielius Landsbergis announced his resignation as leader of the Homeland Union and as member of the next Seimas. He endorsed Ingrida Šimonytė, the outgoing Prime Minister, for the party leadership. Landsbergis also lost in the Centras-Žaliakalnis single-member constituency, which he represented since 2016, to Simonas Kairys of the Liberals' Movement and fellow member of the Šimonytė Cabinet. Radvilė Morkūnaitė-Mikulėnienė became interim leader of the party.

After the second round of the election, various parties lost all their seats in the Seimas, including the Labour Party and the Lithuanian Regions Party. On the other hand, the LSDP won 52 seats, its best ever result. It also won single-member constituencies in Kaunas for the first time since 1992.

On 3 November, Aušrinė Armonaitė announced her resignation as leader of the Freedom Party after it failed to win any seats. On 6 November, Jonas Pinskus of the Lithuanian Regions Party also resigned.

Due to the election of Rimantas Sinkevičius, the council of the Jonava District Municipality would have to find a second mayor pro tempore to serve the position until the March 2025 special mayoral election to replace removed Mayor (and son of Rimantas Sinkevičius) Mindaugas Sinkevičius.

== See also ==
- Elections in Lithuania
