= Shadow Cabinet of Ramūnas Karbauskis =

Current Shadow Cabinet of Lithuania

Karbauskis Shadow Cabinet
- Shadow Cabinet of Lithuania
- 2021–present
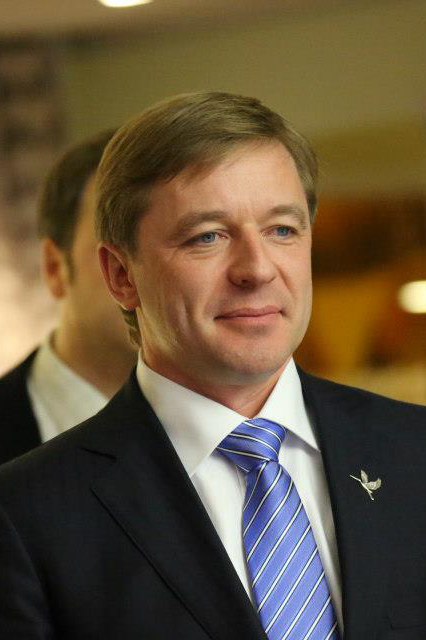
- Date formed: 11 February 2021

People and organisations
- Head of state: Gitanas Nausėda
- Head of shadow government: Ramūnas Karbauskis
- Member party: Farmers and Greens Union

History
- Election: 2020
- Legislature term: Thirteenth Seimas

Shadow Cabinet of Ramūnas Karbauskis is the 2nd Shadow Cabinet of Lithuania. It consists of the current Shadow Prime Minister Ramūnas Karbauskis who is the Head of Shadow Government, and 14 shadow government ministers from the Lithuanian Farmers and Greens Union.

== History ==
On 26 January, Chairman of Farmers and Greens Union Ramūnas Karbauskis revealed that he and his party is going to form the Shadow Cabinet.

On 11 February, Shadow Prime Minister Ramūnas Karbauskis announced his Shadow Cabinet.

On 17 June, Shadow Minister for Social Security and Labour Tomas Tomilinas was fired by Karbauskis, due to voting for a civil partnership law in Seimas, citing betrayal to voters of LVŽS.

== Shadow Cabinet ==
| Position | Name | Party | Office | |
| Position | Name | Party | Start date | End date |
|---|---|---|---|---|
| Shadow Prime Minister | Ramūnas Karbauskis | LVŽS | February 11, 2021 | Present |
| Shadow Minister of Agriculture | Kęstutis Mažeika | LVŽS | February 11, 2021 | Present |
| Shadow Minister of Culture | Aušrinė Norkienė | LVŽS | February 11, 2021 | Present |
| Shadow Minister of Economy and Innovation | Deividas Labanavičius | LVŽS | February 11, 2021 | Present |
| Shadow Minister of Education, Science and Sports | Eugenijus Jovaiša | LVŽS | February 11, 2021 | Present |
| Shadow Minister of Energy | Arvydas Nekrošius | LVŽS | February 11, 2021 | Present |
| Shadow Minister of Environment | Ligita Girskienė | LVŽS | February 11, 2021 | Present |
| Shadow Minister of Finance | Valius Ąžuolas | LVŽS | February 11, 2021 | Present |
| Shadow Minister of Foreign Affairs | Giedrius Surplys | LVŽS | February 11, 2021 | Present |
| Shadow Minister of Health | Aurelijus Veryga | LVŽS | February 11, 2021 | Present |
| Shadow Minister of Interior | Guoda Burokienė | LVŽS | February 11, 2021 | Present |
| Shadow Minister of Justice | Agnė Širinskienė | LVŽS | February 11, 2021 | Present |
| Shadow Minister of National Defence | Dainius Gaižauskas | LVŽS | February 11, 2021 | Present |
| Shadow Minister of Social Security and Labour | TBD | LVŽS | February 11, 2021 | Present |
| Shadow Minister of Transport and Communications | Arvydas Vaitkus | LVŽS | February 11, 2021 | Present |
