= LRT Law Amendments Filibuster =

The LRT Law amendments filibuster was a parliamentary obstruction tactic used by opposition members in the Seimas in December 2025 to delay controversial amendments to the Law on the Lithuanian National Radio and Television (LRT Law), which governs the public broadcaster Lithuanian National Radio and Television (LRT). This event marked the first documented use of a filibuster in modern Lithuanian parliamentary history and resulted in the postponement of the proposed legislation until 2026.

== Background ==
=== LRT and its legal framework ===
LRT is the national public broadcaster of Lithuania. Under the current legal framework, its independence is maintained through a governance structure led by the LRT Council, which consists of 12 members appointed by various state and civic institutions. Historically, the dismissal of the director general required a two-thirds majority (eight out of 12 votes) of the council, a threshold designed to prevent politically motivated leadership changes.

=== Legislative proposals ===
Tensions over LRT's governance arose following the formation of a new ruling coalition after the 2024 Lithuanian parliamentary election, consisting of the Social Democratic Party of Lithuania, Dawn of Nemunas, and the Lithuanian Farmers and Greens Union. The coalition sought to reform the LRT Law to address perceived issues with the broadcaster's leadership and independence.

Two main amendment proposals were introduced:

- The first, proposed by Nemunas Dawn in late November 2025, aimed to lower the threshold for dismissing the LRT director general from two-thirds (8 out of 12) to 6 out of 12 votes on the LRT Council, and to introduce a secret ballot. This bill passed its first reading in the Seimas but faced immediate backlash.
- The second revised version, introduced by the LSDP and the coalition in mid-December, raised the threshold to 7 out of 12 votes (more than half of the Council members) while retaining the secret ballot and removing the "public interest" requirement for dismissal, replacing it with grounds such as improper performance or non-approval of annual reports.

Critics, including journalists, opposition parties, and international organizations, argued that these changes threatened LRT's independence by politicizing its leadership and potentially allowing government interference.

== The filibuster ==
In response to the fast-tracked second proposal, opposition lawmakers from parties such as the Homeland Union (TS-LKD), Union of Democrats "For Lithuania", and Liberals Movement, employed a filibuster by submitting over 1,000 amendments to the bill (reports vary, with some sources citing approximately 470 remaining for committee review and others up to 1,000 total), many of which were deliberately absurd or humorous to highlight the perceived flaws in the legislation. This forced the Seimas Culture Committee to review each amendment individually, significantly delaying proceedings.

This tactic required the Seimas Culture Committee to review each amendment individually, leading to marathon sessions. The committee held extended meetings on Monday and Tuesday (December 15–16), followed by unscheduled and prolonged plenary sessions, including a late-night session on Tuesday that lasted about 12 hours. A further extraordinary session was planned for Thursday (December 18), but it was cancelled after Culture Committee chair Kęstutis Vilkauskas (Social Democrat) fell ill and was hospitalized, leaving hundreds of amendments unconsidered.

Notable satirical amendments included:

- A prominent one proposed by conservative lawmaker Dalia Asanavičiūtė-Gružauskienė, stipulating that the LRT director general could be dismissed early due to no confidence only if MP Agnė Širinskienė’s black cat, Nuodėgulis (meaning "charred coal" in Lithuanian), expressed such no confidence. This "cat amendment" unexpectedly passed a vote in the plenary session on December 16–17 (43–23 with eight abstentions, or similar counts in reports), due to more opposition members present in the chamber at the time. It temporarily altered the bill's text, highlighting the chaos and drawing widespread media attention, both domestic and international.
- Radvilė Morkūnaitė-Mikulėnienė's whimsical idea granting each LRT council member two equal votes when appointing or dismissing the director: one official and one "vote of conscience," with decisions requiring at least one conscience vote per participant—highlighting personal integrity in governance.
- Jurgita Sejonienė's absurd requirements for council decisions: approval by at least 60% of Lithuanian audio media creators (explicitly including podcast "Proto pemza" authors), plus endorsement by a citizens' audit council audited and confirmed by another council of people who never lived in the USSR, mocking excessive bureaucracy and historical fixations.
- Asanavičiūtė-Gružauskienė's gaming delay: postponing the law's enactment until after Grand Theft Auto VI's release (delayed to November 19, 2026), rhetorically asking if freedom of speech would be lost before GTA6, tying media freedom to pop culture.
- Another bizarre proposal: upon dismissing LRT's internal audit head, the audit report must air in place of news program "Panorama" under the title "Skinsiu raudoną rožę" (referencing a folk song, old gardening show, and the symbol of LSDP), while banning any on-air mention of swallows ("kregždutės") – the symbol of Home Union – satirizing transparency and arbitrary censorship.
- Other absurd ideas involved tying provisions to video game releases, restricting the director role to specific political affiliations, or delaying enactment for decades or centuries.

== Public reaction and protests ==
The amendments sparked widespread public opposition. The first major protest occurred on December 9, 2025, in Vilnius's Independence Square, where thousands rallied against the initial Nemunas Dawn proposal under slogans like "Hands Off Free Speech" and "Defend Media Freedom." LRT staff also went on strike that day.

A second wave of protests followed the revised amendments, with a three-day action announced on December 15 and held from December 16 to 18, 2025, drawing thousands more participants, including journalists, cultural figures, and citizens concerned about media independence. Protests included gatherings outside the Seimas and symbolic acts like lighting fires to represent threats to free speech.

== International Reactions ==
The proposals drew criticism from international media freedom organizations:

- Reporters Without Borders (RSF) warned that the changes defied European rules on public broadcaster independence.
- European Centre for Press and Media Freedom (ECPMF) and Media Freedom Rapid Response (MFRR) raised alarms over political pressure on LRT.
- International Press Institute (IPI) highlighted increasing pressure on public service broadcasting.
- The European Broadcasting Union (EBU) expressed serious concerns about threats to LRT's autonomy.
- The Council of Europe's Venice Commission issued a reference document on the amendments, noting shifts in dismissal procedures and financing.

== Resolution ==
On December 18, 2025, President Gitanas Nausėda criticized both the fast-track process and the opposition's tactics, suggesting that the LRT Council and administration resign voluntarily to resolve the crisis. Following negotiations, the ruling coalition announced on December 19 that the vote would be postponed to 2026, abandoning the urgent procedure. The Seimas autumn session ended on December 23 without passing the amendments.

== Significance ==
The filibuster and protests underscored growing political polarization in Lithuania and debates over media freedom in the EU context. It successfully delayed the bill, forcing a compromise and drawing global attention to safeguards for public broadcasters.
