= Agnė Širinskienė =

Lithuanian politician

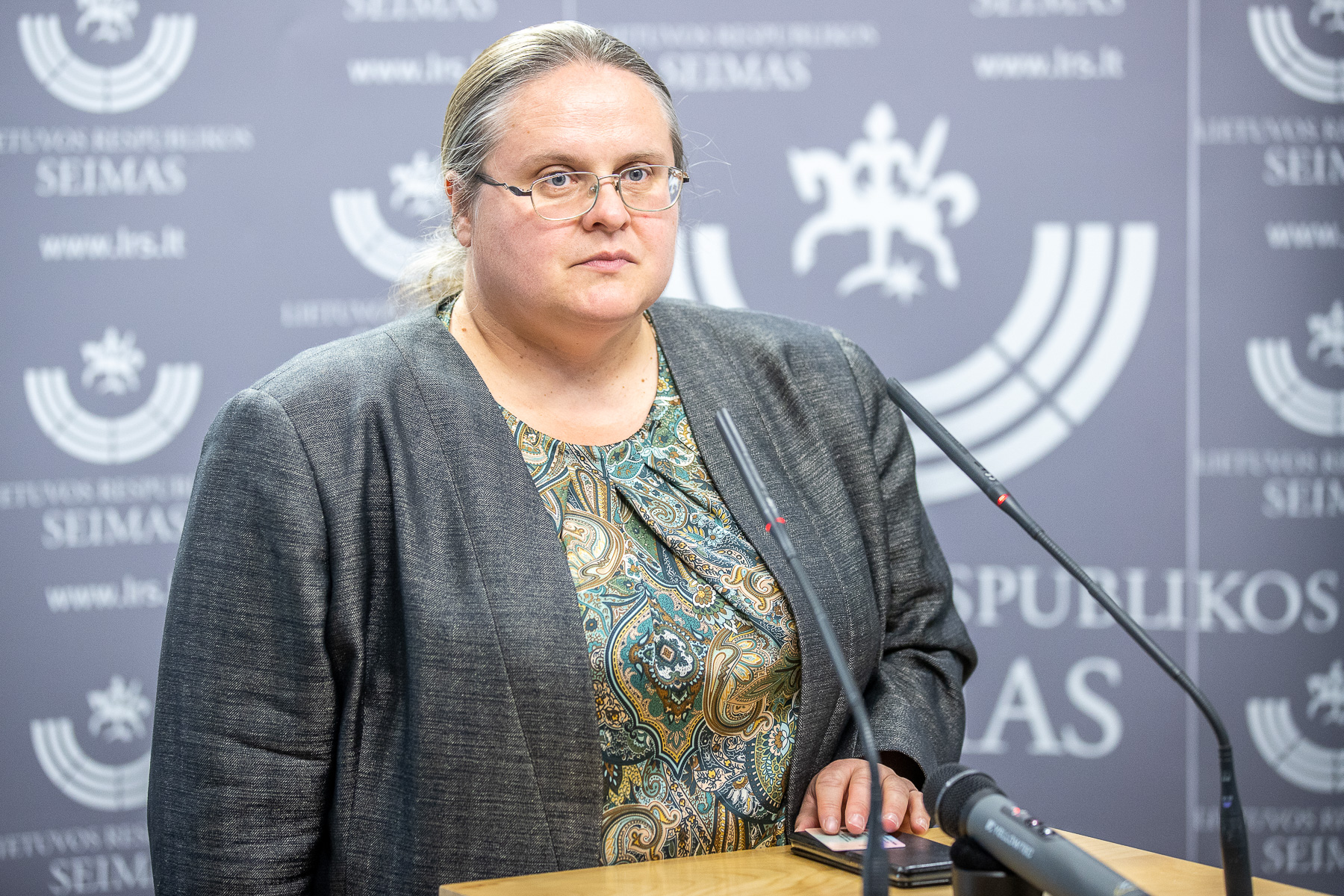
- Širinskienė in 2023

Member of the Seimas
- Incumbent
- Assumed office 14 November 2016
- Constituency: Multi-member

Personal details
- Born: 9 November 1975 (age 50) Vilnius, Lithuania
- Party: Dawn of Nemunas (2024–2025); Union of Democrats "For Lithuania" (since 2025)
- Other political affiliations: Lithuanian Farmers and Greens Union (2016-2021)
- Spouse: Arvydas Širinskas
- Education: Vytautas Magnus University (BA; MA); Mykolas Romeris University (PhD)

Agnė Širinskienė (born 9 November 1975) is a Lithuanian politician. She was elected to the Seimas with the Lithuanian Farmers and Greens Union in 2016. One of the leading members of the party, she was described as "Ramūnas Karbauskis's hitwoman". She left the party in 2021 and joined Dawn of Nemunas in 2024.

== Background ==
Širinskienė was born in Vilnius in 1975 and graduated from school in Dūkštas in 1993. She graduated from Vytautas Magnus University with a master's degree in pastoral theology in 2000. In 2005, she obtained a doctor's degree of humanitarian sciences from Mykolas Romeris University. In 2016, it was revealed that her doctoral thesis claims that "the spread of AIDS is a reminder that man's presence in the world is not solely determined by forces under his control. In this case, God, who punishes for moral evil and the distortion of the purpose of sexuality with sexually transmitted disease". Širinskienė claimed that the quote was taken out of context and she argued against it in her thesis.

From 2004 until 2016, she was an associate professor at the Institute of Public Law of Mykolas Romeris University. Before 2016, she was also a non-statutory expert for the Seimas Committee on Health.

== Political career ==
Širinskienė ran as the Farmers and Greens Union candidate in the Polish-majority Šalčininkai constituency in the 2016 Lithuanian parliamentary election and was soundly defeated by Polish Electoral Action candidate Leonard Talmont. However, she entered the Seimas on the party's electoral list.

Širinskienė became the chairwoman of the Seimas Committee on Health Affairs. Soon after the election, she was criticized by the medical community for her attempt to restrict assisted reproductive technology.

After the party's vice-chairwoman Greta Kildišienė resigned over suspected embezzlement from her workplace on 24 January 2017, Širinskienė became one of the party's chairman Ramūnas Karbauskis's key allies in parliament. Described as a "duo", they were stated as being responsible for most of the strategic decisions in the party's parliamentary group. Justas Džiugelis described her as "Karbauskis's hitwoman", and Povilas Urbšys described them as "the chief of the Seimas, more powerful than the Speaker, Viktoras Pranckietis".

Širinskienė led several investigatory commissions throughout the Twelfth Seimas of Lithuania, including an investigation into Gabrielius Landsbergis and his wife's business, potential corruption and influence over state organs. In January 2019, Širinskienė, Artūras Skardžius and Rima Baškienė displayed a shooting range target in the Seimas chamber which they named "Gabrielius".

Širinskienė was reelected in 2020. In December 2021, she left the Farmers and Greens. The media described her decision to leave as surprising due to her close cooperation with Karbauskis. As reasons for her departure, Širinskienė cited insults, reproaches and bullying by her colleagues, complaints over her presence in the media, including an order to avoid entering the parliamentary chamber through the main entrance to avoid being seen by journalists, and lack of support, while remaining deputies in the party claimed that she left due to her difficult character. However, she did not join the newly founded Union of Democrats "For Lithuania", established by other former members of the Farmers and Greens around the same time. Though she was invited by the party's chairman Saulius Skvernelis, many of the party's members were opposed to her joining. In June 2024, Širinskienė joined the Dawn of Nemunas (NA), led by the controversial politician Remigijus Žemaitaitis.

Širinskienė was once again reelected to Seimas in 2024 and was appointed as the 6th Deputy Speaker of Seimas. After the elections, NA signed the coalition agreement with LSDP and the Union of Democrats and formed a new government with Dawn of Nemunas gaining the Ministries of Justice, Environment and Agriculture. Soon after Širinskienė criticized the agreement stating that NA should not be held responsible for the Ministers of Justice, Environment and Agriculture as they are non-partisan and are unrelated to the Dawn of Nemunas. Širinskienė also noted that the coalition agreement should be reviewed.

In December 2024, she criticized Remigijus Žemaitaitis over his threats that NA will leave the coalition if he's not appointed the 7th Deputy Speaker of Seimas following a dispute with LSDP and the Union of Democrats. Soon after Širinskienė stated that the Dawn of Nemunas is not seriously considering leaving the coalition. In reaction to this Žemaitaitis forbade Širinskienė to publicly comment on NA matters. On the same day, Širinskienė announced that she was considering leaving the Dawn of Nemunas.

== Personal life ==
Širinskienė is a Roman Catholic.
