= Arūnas Dudėnas =

Lithuanian politician (born 1983)

Member of the Seimas
- Incumbent
- Assumed office 14 November 2024
- Preceded by: Tomas Tomilinas
- Constituency: Deltuva North
- In office 16 November 2012 – 14 November 2016

Personal details
- Born: 23 August 1983 (age 42)
- Party: Social Democratic Party

Arūnas Dudėnas (born 23 August 1983) is a Lithuanian politician of the Social Democratic Party. He was elected member of the Seimas in the 2024 parliamentary election, having previously served from 2012 to 2016. He was a member of the municipal council of Ukmergė from 2007 to 2012 and from 2019 to 2024.
