= Remigijus Žemaitaitis =

Lithuanian politician (born 1982)

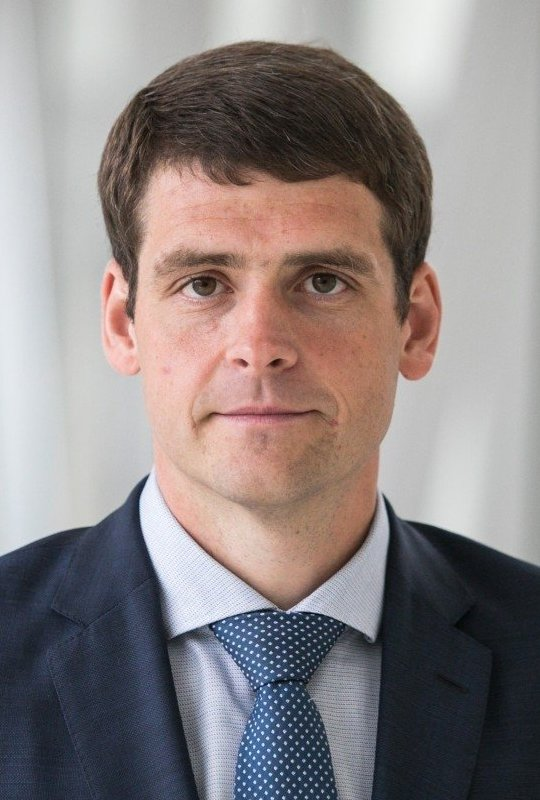
- Žemaitaitis in 2024

Member of the Seimas
- Incumbent
- Assumed office 14 November 2024
- Constituency: Kelmė–Šilalė
- In office 8 December 2009 – 29 April 2024
- Preceded by: Zigmantas Balčytis
- Constituency: Šilalė–Šilutė (2009–16); Southern Samogitia (2016–20); Kelmė–Šilalė (2020–24)

Deputy Speaker of the Seimas
- In office 28 September 2018 – 12 November 2019

Personal details
- Born: 30 May 1982 (age 44) Šilutė, Lithuania
- Party: Dawn of Nemunas (since 2023)
- Other political affiliations: Order and Justice (2009–2019); Freedom and Justice (2020–2023)
- Spouse: Živilė Žemaitaitienė
- Children: 2
- Education: Vilnius University

Remigijus Žemaitaitis (born 30 May 1982) is a Lithuanian right-wing populist politician and member of the Seimas. He is the founder and leader of the political party Dawn of Nemunas.

Žemaitaitis was first elected to the Seimas in 2009 and served continuously until 2024, initially as a member of the right-wing party Order and Justice, then from 2020 as a member of its successor, Freedom and Justice. Žemaitaitis served as the chair of both parties from 2016 to 2022. He also served as one of the Deputy Speakers of the Seimas from 2018 to 2019.

In 2023, Žemaitaitis was suspended from Freedom and Justice after making multiple antisemitic remarks, leading him to found Dawn of Nemunas. In 2024, the Constitutional Court decided that he had violated his oath, and he resigned from the Seimas to avoid a removal vote.

In October 2024, Žemaitaitis was elected to the Seimas as the leader of Dawn of Nemunas. His party joined the ruling coalition under Social Democratic PM Gintautas Paluckas and remains part of the reorganized ruling coalition under PM Inga Ruginienė.

== Early life ==
Žemaitaitis was born on 30 May 1982 in Šilutė. In 2005, he graduated from the Faculty of Law at Vilnius University. Until 2007 he worked as a lawyer and assistant at courts. Between 2007 and 2009 he worked as an assistant to the mayor of Vilnius and, later, to members of the European Parliament Juozas Imbrasas and Rolandas Paksas. The latter had previously served as President of Lithuania.

== Political career ==
A member of the Order and Justice party, Žemaitaitis was elected to the Tenth Seimas in 2009, in the by-election in the single-seat constituency of Šilalė–Šilutė. He was reelected to the Eleventh Seimas in 2012. He was elected the chairman of the Economics Committee at the parliament.

In the 2016 elections, Žemaitaitis headed the electoral list of Order and Justice. He was elected as MP representing the single-seat constituency of Southern Samogitia, a new name for the Šilalė district, now defined to exclude Šilutė. After these elections, the party's leader Rolandas Paksas resigned. Žemaitaitis became the interim leader of the party. Order and Justice joined the Lithuanian Farmers and Greens Union-led government in late 2018. In September 2018, according to the coalition's agreement, Žemaitaitis was appointed as one of the Deputy Speakers of the Seimas. Two months later, the Order and Justice parliamentary group dissolved itself and Žemaitaitis became an unaffiliated member of Seimas.

In October 2019, after Žemaitaitis backed an effort to strip Viktoras Pranckietis of his position as Speaker of the Seimas, the leader of the Lithuanian Farmers and Greens Union party Ramūnas Karbauskis urged Žemaitaitis to resign from his Deputy Speaker position, calling the move a "betrayal" of the ruling coalition. The next month, Žemaitaitis was removed from his position as Deputy Speaker after a vote of no confidence, with 72 MPs for removal and 5 against.

In 2020, the Lithuanian Freedom Union (Liberals), the Order and Justice and the movement "Forward, Lithuania" merged into the Freedom and Justice party. Žemaitaitis was elected its leader. In that year's parliamentary elections, he won a seat representing the Kelmė–Šilalė constituency, again geographically redefined. In November 2022, Artūras Paulauskas succeeded him as leader of Freedom and Justice.

On 27 January 2024, Žemaitaitis announced that he would run as a candidate in the 2024 presidential election. He finished in fourth place overall, receiving 9.21% of the vote in the first round of the election held on 12 May.

Žemaitaitis participated in the 2024 parliamentary election as the leader of the Dawn of Nemunas party. He received 47.83% of the vote in the Kelmė–Šilalė constituency and was promptly elected in the first round. The party came in third place overall, receiving 14.97% of the vote and securing 20 members in parliament. Dawn of Nemunas received a plurality of the vote in much of western Lithuania (Samogitia and Lithuania Minor). Following the election, the Dawn of Nemunas and Union of Democrats "For Lithuania" parties formed a ruling coalition led by the Lithuanian Social Democratic Party, which finished first overall.

== Controversies ==
In September 2018, while giving an interview to a Russian-language weekly newspaper Ekspress nedelya, Žemaitaitis stated that he was against what he referred to as "anti-Russian sanctions" and advocated for talks.

In November 2022, while going for a visit to Belarus, under the invitation of Žemaitaitis, lawmaker and member of the far-right party Alternative for Germany Petr Bystron visited Lithuania.

=== Antisemitism ===
Between May and June 2023, Žemaitaitis publicly made five posts on Facebook that were condemned as antisemitic. The first two posts on 8 May criticised the state of Israel for human rights violations against Palestinians, and in particular the destruction of an EU-funded school in the West Bank. Both of these posts quoted a well-known Lithuanian rhyme about murdering Jews (Lithuanian: Lipo žydas kopėčiom ir nukrito netyčiom. Imkit, vaikai, pagaliuką ir užmuškit tą žyduką, lit. 'A Jew was climbing the ladder and accidentally fell off; take a stick, kids, and kill that little Jew.'). A later post on 13 June was written in response to a visit to Israel by Lithuanian Prime Minister Ingrida Šimonytė. In this post, Žemaitaitis falsely claimed that a 1944 massacre in the village of Pirčiupiai was committed by Jews and Russians instead of its actual perpetrators, the Nazi German Schutzstaffel (SS), and further wrote that Lithuanians had suffered a greater Holocaust than Jews had. Žemaitaitis later stated that he had been mistaken about Pirčiupiai and had meant to refer to another event.

The comments were strongly criticised and condemned by Lithuanian politicians, the Lithuanian Jewish community, and a number of ambassadors in Lithuania. On 19 May 2023, Freedom and Justice temporarily suspended Žemaitaitis' membership in party due to his antisemitic statements. Before the vote to start impeachment proceedings against him, Žemaitaitis left the party and founded the Dawn of Nemunas. During his remarks in Parliament, Žemaitaitis asserted that his statements were targeted towards Israel's actions against Palestinians, before the start of the 2023 war, and afterwards clarified that he would support a death sentence for Benjamin Netanyahu. He denounced the investigations into them as political repression and character assassination. In April 2024, the Constitutional Court decided that the politician had broken his oath as a member of Seimas and violated the country's Constitution, deeming the statements antisemitic. Right after that, in order to avoid the vote on removal from the parliament, Žemaitaitis resigned as the member of the Seimas. Žemaitaitis lodged an appeal in the European Court of Human Rights against Lithuania over his impeachment procedures and the ruling.

Following the 2024 Lithuanian parliamentary election, the decision of the victorious Social Democrats to invite Dawn of Nemunas into the new ruling coalition provoked local and international backlash focusing on Žemaitaitis' past statements. Politicians in the United States, Germany, Poland, and Israel criticised the decision to include Dawn of Nemunas, as did civil society groups and protesters in Lithuania. Žemaitaitis reacted by claiming that the international reactions had been instigated by his political opponents. He also sent a letter to ambassadors of NATO and EU countries, as well as Israel, stating that he is not anti-Semitic, simply critical of Israel's actions, and that he believes in equality and human dignity. In the letter he mentioned that he had met with the Jewish community in Kaunas during the campaign to express his regret and respect.

In October 2025, amid protests against Dawn of Nemunas among the Lithuanian cultural sector, Žemaitaitis accused protest leader and former culture minister Arūnas Gelūnas of organizing a coup and of being Jewish, calling him "Aaron Gelbach". Gelūnas decried these remarks as antisemitic and denied having Jewish ancestry, providing a photograph of his grandparents sitting with a Catholic priest. The Lithuanian police opened a pre-trial investigation into Žemaitaitis for incitement to hatred.

In December 2025, Žemaitaitis was convicted of making anti-Semitic remarks and fined 5,000 euros ($5,800).

=== Other investigations in 2024 ===
On 19 November 2024, the Prosecutor's Office began investigation into alleged defamation of Ingrida Šimonytė made by the politician on Facebook.

In November 2024, the Lithuanian Police had begun investigation of another Facebook post made by Žemaitaitis, on grounds of BK 170.2 pertaining to ethnic hatred. In the post he called for protestors to gather with candles in front of the home of Vytautas Landsbergis, Lithuania's first post-Soviet leader and the former head of the opposing Homeland Union party. This post was made as a response to a protest that was planned to be held in Independence Square in Vilnius against the inclusion of Dawn of Nemunas in the ruling Seimas coalition.

=== Elon Musk hoax ===
In February 2025, Žemaitaitis wrote a public letter to Elon Musk, then serving as the head of the US Department of Government Efficiency (DOGE), requesting information on USAID operations in Lithuania. Žemaitaitis claimed that USAID funds had been used to influence Lithuanian politics and offered to meet with Musk. The letter was found to be nearly identical to one written by Slovak prime minister Robert Fico. Investigative journalist Birutė Davidonytė speculated that pro-Russian politicians in Europe may have been coordinating their messaging, but Žemaitaitis claimed that the letter was composed by his assistants following his own instructions.

On 4 March 2025, Žemaitaitis announced that he had been tricked by a scammer claiming to be DOGE employee Ryan Riedel. The prankster had invited him on an all-expenses-paid trip to the US to meet Musk and the DOGE team and to receive information on USAID. After arriving at the airport, Žemaitaitis discovered that the tickets provided for him and his wife were fake. In his correspondence with the scammer, leaked to the media by the latter party, Žemaitaitis confirmed his travel itinerary, which was to include a Broadway musical and a stay at a five-star hotel, and also criticized president Gitanas Nausėda.

Members of the Seimas criticized Žemaitaitis for failing to disclose the nature of the trip, which he had claimed was a private trip despite his belief that he would meet with US officials. The Special Investigation Service, a Lithuanian anti-corruption agency, launched an investigation into the incident, which ended with no criminal charges being filed. A police investigation was also launched into the travel documents sent by the prankster. In June 2025, the Seimas Ethics Committee decided that Žemaitaitis had violated the government's code of conduct by failing to disclose information on the costs of his trip and by sharing information on national security with the scammer.

== Political views ==
Žemaitaitis describes himself as a conservative liberal. Analysts have described him as a populist.

Žemaitaitis is opposed to legalization of multiple citizenship in Lithuania, and supports civil unions for same-sex couples, but not same-sex marriage. He abstained on the 26 May 2022 vote on a compromise civil union bill in the Seimas. He is opposed to the ratification of the Istanbul Convention.

In 2017, he proposed the restoration of the death penalty in Lithuania.

== Personal life ==
Remigijus Žemaitaitis is married to Živilė Žemaitaitienė. They have two children. His hobbies include fishing, traveling, reading, and cooking. In addition to his native Lithuanian, he speaks English and Russian.

As of 2023, Žemaitaitis was the fifth-wealthiest member of the Seimas, with 940,000 euros in declared assets.

Seimas
Preceded by Zigmantas Balčytis	Member of the Seimas for Šilalė and Šilutė/Southern Samogitia/Kelmė and Šilalė; 2009–present	Incumbent
