= Tadas Barauskas =

Lithuanian politician (born 1977)

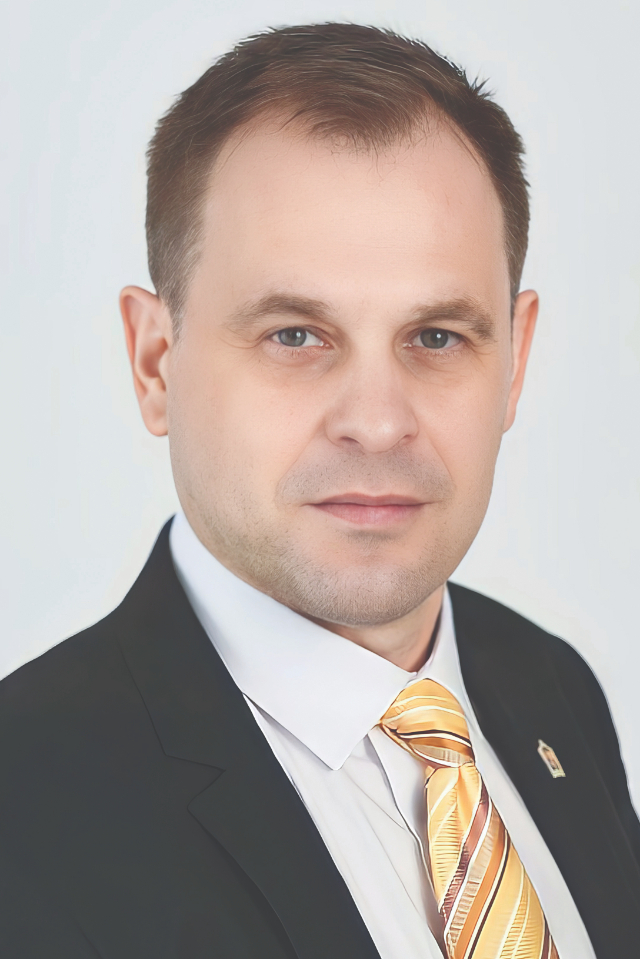

Member of the Seimas
- Assuming office 2024 November 14
- Succeeding: Vidmantas Kanopa
- Constituency: East Sėla

Personal details
- Born: 30 May 1977 (age 48)
- Party: Social Democratic Party

Tadas Barauskas (born 30 May 1977) is a Lithuanian politician of the Social Democratic Party who was elected member of the Seimas in the 2024 parliamentary election. He previously served as deputy mayor of Rokiškis.
