= Darius Razmislevičius =

Lithuanian politician (born 1980)

Member-elect of the Seimas
- Assuming office TBD
- Succeeding: Kazys Starkevičius
- Constituency: Petrašiūnai–Gričiupis

Personal details
- Born: 15 November 1980 (age 45)
- Party: Social Democratic Party

Darius Razmislevičius (born 15 November 1980) is a Lithuanian politician of the Social Democratic Party who was elected member of the Seimas in the 2024 parliamentary election. He previously served as a city councillor of Kaunas.
