= Agnė Jakavičiūtė-Miliauskienė =

Lithuanian politician (born 1987)

Member of the Seimas
- Incumbent
- Assumed office 14 November 2024
- Preceded by: Valentinas Bukauskas
- Constituency: Telšiai

Personal details
- Born: Agnė Jakavičiutė; 24 July 1987 (age 38)
- Party: Union of Democrats "For Lithuania"

Agnė Jakavičiutė-Miliauskienė (née Jakavičiūtė; born 24 July 1987) is a Lithuanian politician of the Union of Democrats "For Lithuania" serving as a member of the Seimas since 2024. Until 2024, she served as deputy mayor of Telšiai.
