= Robert Puchovič =

Lithuanian politician (born 1990)

Member of the Seimas
- Incumbent
- Assumed office 14 November 2024

Personal details
- Born: 30 April 1990 (age 35)
- Party: Dawn of Nemunas

Robert Puchovič (Polish: Robert Puchowicz; 30 April 1990) is a Lithuanian politician of the Dawn of Nemunas serving as a member of the Seimas since 2024. He is a deputy group leader of the party in the Seimas, alongside Agnė Širinskienė. He is of Polish ethnicity.
