= Giedrius Drukteinis =

Lithuanian politician (born 1970)

Member of the Seimas
- Incumbent
- Assumed office 14 November 2024
- Constituency: Multi-member

Personal details
- Born: 17 January 1970 (age 56) Vilnius, Lithuania
- Party: Social Democratic Party (2020-current)
- Education: Vilnius University

Giedrius Drukteinis (born 17 January 1970) is a Lithuanian author, TV presenter, communications coach, journalist and politician. In the 2024 parliamentary election, he was elected as member of the Seimas on the list of the Social Democratic Party.

== Biography ==
Drukteinis was born on 17 January 1970 in Vilnius and graduated with a degree in journalism from Vilnius University in 1994. From 1993 to 1997, he headed the Advertising Department of Lithuanian Airlines, and was director of the Information Department of the Lithuanian Development Agency from 1999 to 2001. Since 2003, he is the director of Reichmann Communications, a communications training company, and is one of the company's lecturers.

He was the presenter of the programme "Vartotojų kontrolė" (English: "Consumer Control") on consumer education, consumer rights and home cooking, on LRT televizija, since 2018. He was one of the participants in the LRT project Maestro, modelled after the BBC project with the same name, in 2021.

Drukteinis is the author of nine books on etiquette, marketing, Ulster, Israel and the Vietnam War. He is married.

== Political career ==
Drukteinis joined the Social Democratic Party and ran as the party's candidate in the Karšuva constituency, which includes Jurbarkas and the surrounding district, in the 2020 parliamentary election, where he finished fourth with 13.03 percent of the vote. He stated that he joined the Social Democrats because his father is a longtime member and because of his own respect for the party.

In the 2023 municipal election in the Jurbarkas District Municipality, Drukteinis was elected to the municipal council on the Social Democratic list. In the 2024 parliamentary election, he ran as the Social Democratic candidate in the Pilaitė-Karoliniškės constituency, but failed to advance to the second round - however, he was elected to the Seimas on the party's list in the multi-member constituency.

Drukteinis describes himself as "a supporter of old social-democratic ideas". He is known for candid political commentary. In 2017, he proposed the formation of a nationwide mandatory uniformed youth organization for education of youth and national unity.
