= Tadas Prajara =

Lithuanian politician (born 1986)

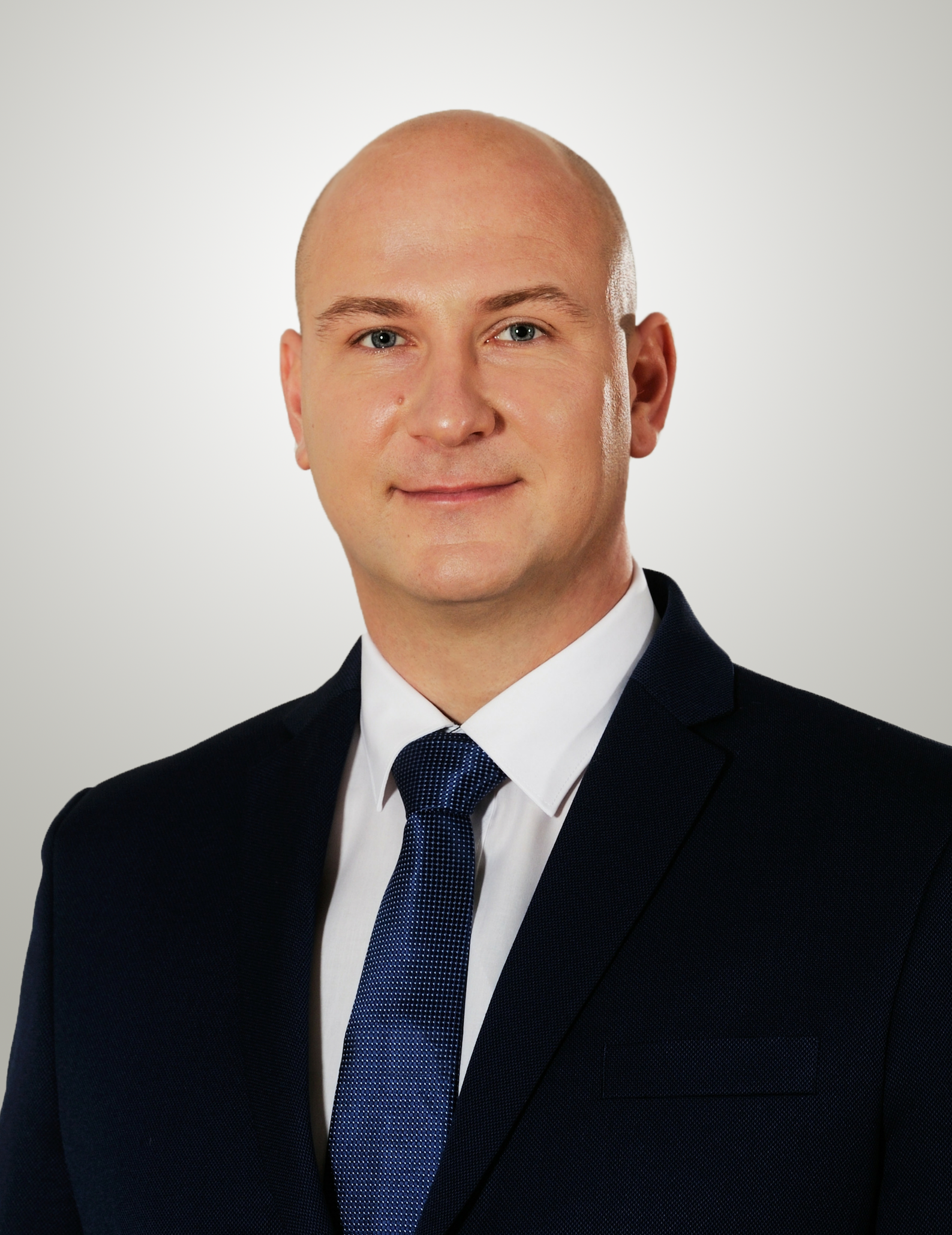
- Prajara in 2020

Member-elect of the Seimas
- Incumbent
- Assumed office TBD

Personal details
- Born: 1 September 1986 (age 39)
- Party: Social Democratic Party

Tadas Prajara (born 1 September 1986) is a Lithuanian politician of the Social Democratic Party who was elected member of the Seimas in the 2024 parliamentary election. He previously served as a municipal councillor of Marijampolė.
