= Tomas Domarkas =

Lithuanian politician (born 1977)

Member of the Seimas
- Incumbent
- Assumed office 14 November 2024
- Preceded by: Jonas Varkalys
- Constituency: Plungė–Rietavas

Personal details
- Born: 30 November 1977 (age 48)
- Party: Dawn of Nemunas

Tomas Domarkas (born 30 November 1977) is a Lithuanian politician of the Dawn of Nemunas serving as a member of the Seimas since 2024. He was elected for the Plungė–Rietavas constituency against deputy speaker Jurgis Razma.
