= Karolis Neimantas =

Lithuanian politician (born 1991)

Member of the Seimas
- Incumbent
- Assumed office 14 November 2024
- Preceded by: Mindaugas Skritulskas
- Constituency: Mėguva

Personal details
- Born: 12 December 1991 (age 34)
- Party: NA (since 2024)
- Other political affiliations: LP (2019–2021)

Karolis Neimantas (born 12 December 1991) is a Lithuanian politician of the Dawn of Nemunas serving as a member of the Seimas since 2024. In the 2020 parliamentary election, he was a candidate of the Freedom Party.
