= Petras Dargis =

Lithuanian politician (born 1955)

Member of the Seimas
- Incumbent
- Assumed office 14 November 2024

Personal details
- Born: 17 January 1955 (age 71)
- Party: Dawn of Nemunas

Petras Dargis (born 17 January 1955) is a Lithuanian politician of the Dawn of Nemunas serving as a member of the Seimas since 2024. He worked as a journalist from 1975 to 2019 and served as a municipal councillor of Šilalė from 2021 to 2023.
