= Linas Jonauskas =

Lithuanian politician (born 1979)

Member of the Seimas
- Incumbent
- Assumed office 13 November 2020

Personal details
- Born: 11 July 1979 (age 46)
- Party: Social Democratic Party

Linas Jonauskas (born 11 July 1979) is a Lithuanian politician of the Social Democratic Party serving as a member of the Seimas since 2020. From 2012 to 2016, he served as deputy minister of environment.
