= Tadas Sadauskis =

Lithuanian politician (born 1996)

Member of the Seimas
- Incumbent
- Assumed office 14 November 2024
- Preceded by: Romualdas Vaitkus
- Constituency: Tauragė

Personal details
- Born: 23 May 1996 (age 29)
- Party: Dawn of Nemunas

Tadas Sadauskis (born 23 May 1996) is a Lithuanian politician of the Dawn of Nemunas serving as a member of the Seimas since 2024. From 2023 to 2024, he was a municipal councillor of Šilalė.
