= Jekaterina Rojaka =

Lithuanian politician (born 1978)

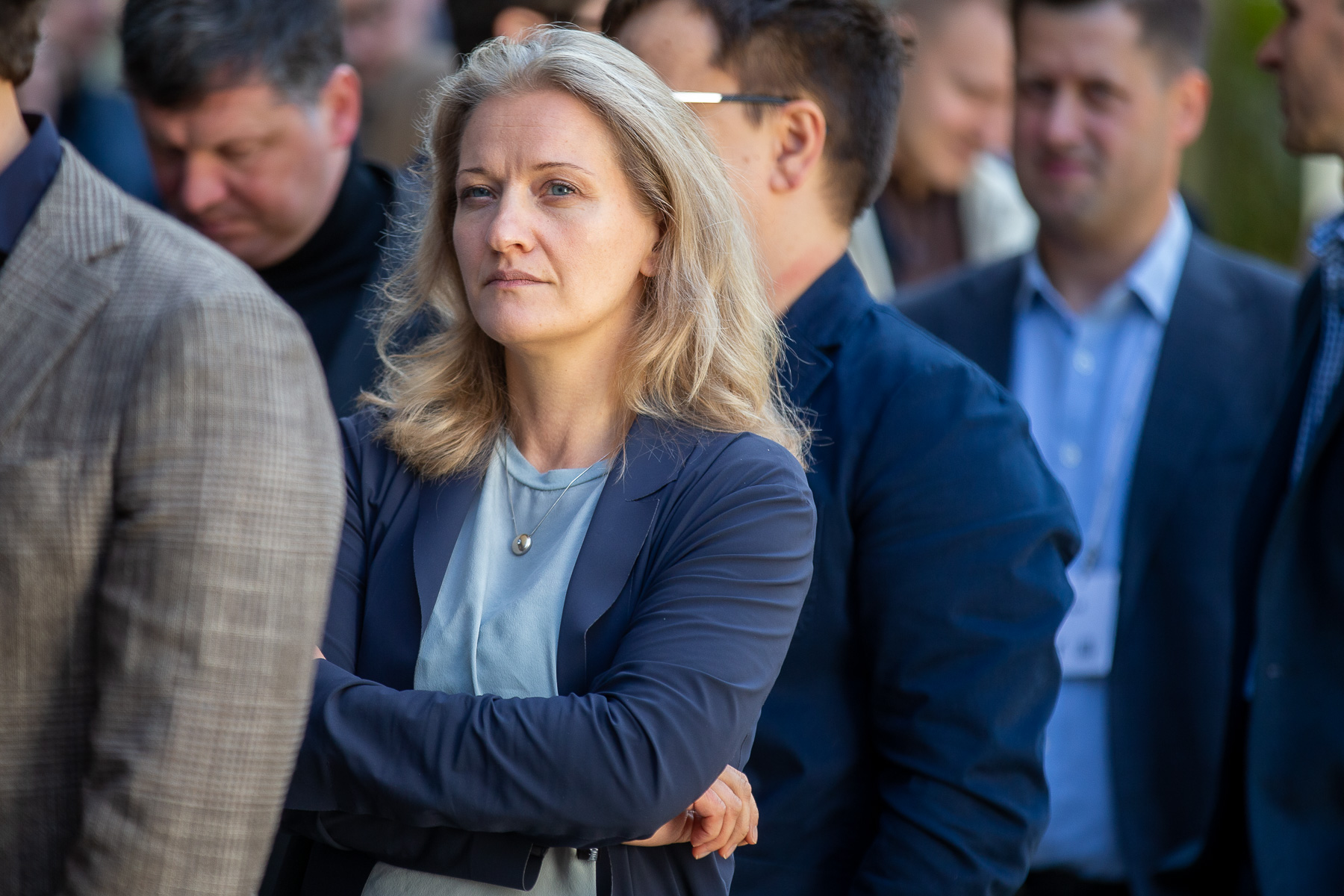
- Rojaka in 2022

Member of the Seimas
- Incumbent
- Assumed office 16 July 2024
- Preceded by: Aurelijus Veryga

Personal details
- Born: 29 June 1978 (age 47)
- Party: Union of Democrats "For Lithuania"

Jekaterina Rojaka (born 29 June 1978) is a Lithuanian economist and politician serving as a member of the Seimas since 2024. From 2019 to 2020, she served as a deputy minister of economy and innovation.
