= Martynas Gedvilas =

Lithuanian politician (born 1989)

Member of the Seimas
- Incumbent
- Assumed office 14 November 2024

Personal details
- Born: 16 September 1989 (age 36)
- Party: Dawn of Nemunas (since 2024)
- Other political affiliations: Order and Justice (2017–2020); Freedom and Justice (2020–2023)

Martynas Gedvilas (born 16 September 1989) is a Lithuanian politician of the Dawn of Nemunas serving as a member of the Seimas since 2024. He was a member of Order and Justice from 2017 to 2020, and a member of Freedom and Justice from 2020 to 2023.
