= Vytautas Jucius =

Lithuanian politician (born 1963)

Member of the Seimas
- Incumbent
- Assumed office 14 November 2024

Personal details
- Born: 8 August 1963 (age 62)
- Party: Dawn of Nemunas (since 2024)

Vytautas Jucius (born 8 August 1963) is a Lithuanian politician of the Dawn of Nemunas serving as a member of the Seimas since 2024. He previously served as a municipal councillor of Šilalė.
