= Rima Baškienė =

Lithuanian politician

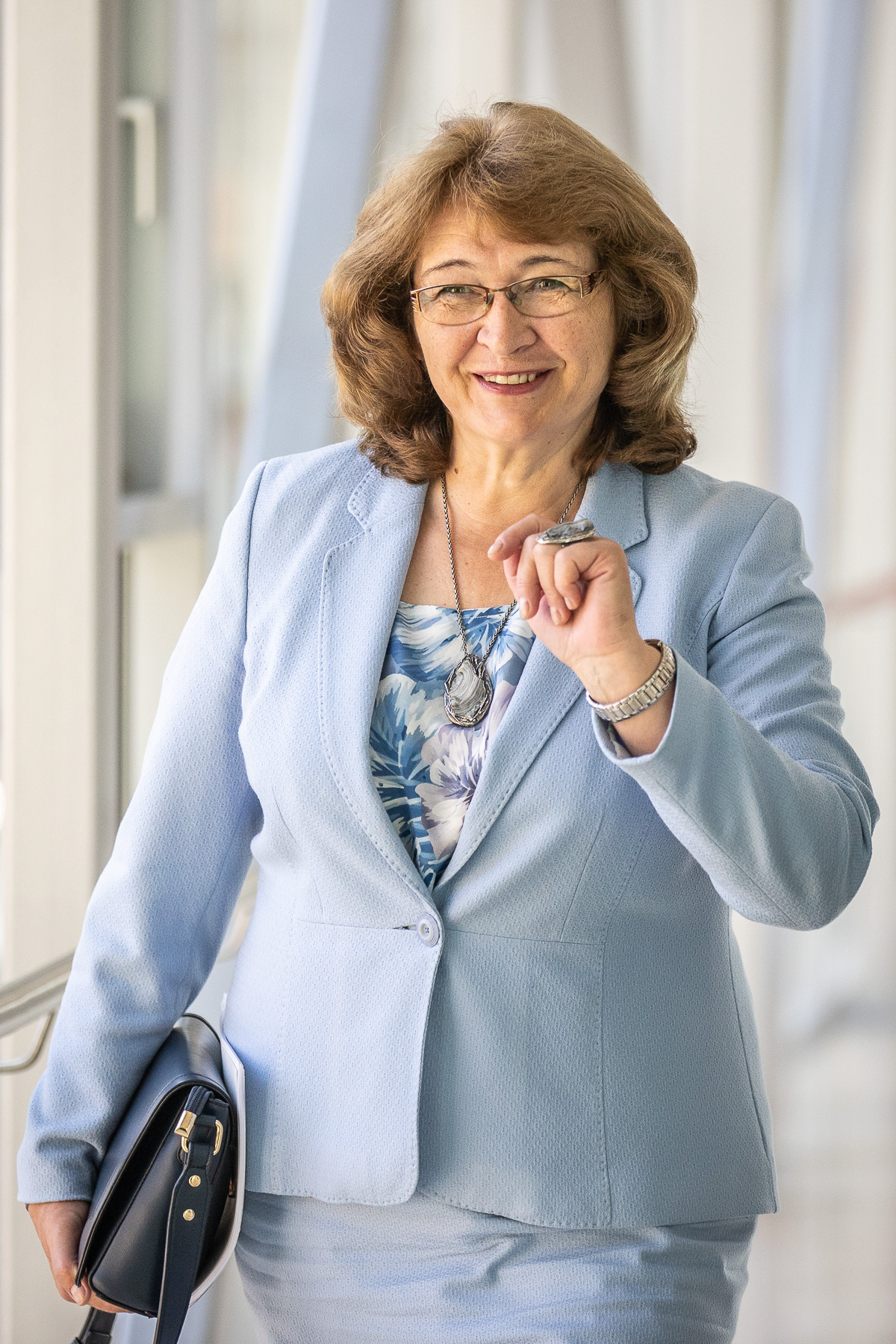
- Portrait, 2023

First Deputy Speaker of the Seimas
- In office 15 November 2016 – 13 November 2020
- Preceded by: Vydas Gedvilas
- Succeeded by: Jurgis Razma

Member of the Seimas
- Incumbent
- Assumed office 15 November 2004
- Preceded by: Ramūnas Karbauskis (Šiauliai countryside); Constituency created (Kuršėnai - Dainai); Constituency created (Šiauliai region)
- Constituency: Šiauliai countryside (2004-2016); Kuršėnai - Dainai (2016-2020); Šiauliai region (2020-)

Vice Chairwoman of the Lithuanian Farmers and Greens Union
- In office 1996–2019

Vice Mayor of Šiauliai District
- In office 2000–2004

Personal details
- Born: 25 October 1960 (age 64); Kentriai, Lithuanian SSR, Soviet Union
- Political party: Lithuanian Farmers and Greens Union (1996-2021); Independent (2021-2022); Union of Democrats "For Lithuania" (2022—present)
- Spouse: Raimondas Baškys
- Children: 2
- Education: Kaunas University of Technology

Rima Baškienė (born 25 October 1960) is a Lithuanian politician who has served in the Seimas since 2004. She was first deputy speaker from 2016 to 2020.

== Early life and education ==
Rima Baškienė was born in Kentriai, Lithuanian SSR, Soviet Union, on 25 October 1960. She attended Secondary School No. 1 in Kentriai from 1974 to 1978, and received a diploma of technology from Kaunas Polytechni Institute after attending from 1978 to 1983.

== Career ==
Baškienė was a technology engineer in Plungė from 1983 to 1984, and an economist on the Executive Committee of Šiauliai District. She was an instructure for the Committee of Agricultural Workers’ Trade Union in the Šiauliai District from 1984 to 1994. She was an assistant secretary to Ramūnas Karbauskis, a member of the Seimas from 1997 to 2000.

In 1996, Baškienė joined the Lithuanian Popular Peasants' Union, which was later renamed to the Lithuanian Farmers and Greens Union. She was elected to the municipal council of the Šiauliai District in 2000, and later served as deputy mayor.

In the 2004 election Baškienė won a seat in the Seimas. During her tenure in the Seimas she served on the Social Affairs and Labour, and Education, Science, and Culture committees. She was chair of the Family and Child Affairs commission. She was a member of the Seimas delegation to the Baltic Assembly. She was one of 13 members of parliament who announced the creation of a new political party under the leadership of Saulius Skvernelis on 18 October 2021.

Ramūnas Karbauskis announced on 9 November 2016, that Baškienė would be nominated for first deputy speaker. She held the position from 15 November 2016 to 13 November 2020.

In 2021, Baškienė left that party and, in the beginning of 2022, she joined the newly formed Union of Democrats "For Lithuania", founded by former prime minister Saulius Skvernelis, the former leader of election list of the Lithuanian Farmers and Greens Union.

== Personal life ==
Baškienė married Raimondas Baškys, with whom she had two children. She can speak Lithuanian, German, and Russian.

== Works cited ==
=== News ===
- "Lithuania's former PM announces plans for new political party". Lithuanian National Radio and Television. 18 October 2021. Archived from the original on 28 June 2025.
- Bartkutė, Lina (9 November 2016). "Seimo pirmininkas bus V. Pranckietis, o vicepirmininkė – R. Baškienė". Lrytas.lt. Archived from the original on 10 November 2016.

=== Web ===
- "Rima Baškienė". Central Electoral Commission. Archived from the original on 20 February 2019.
- "Rima Baškienė". Seimas. Archived from the original on 28 June 2025.

Seimas
Preceded by Ramūnas Karbauskis	Member of the Seimas for Šiauliai rural electoral district 2004–present	Incumbent
