= Mantas Poškus =

Lithuanian politician (born 1980)

Member of the Seimas
- Incumbent
- Assumed office 14 November 2024

Personal details
- Born: 16 September 1980 (age 45)
- Party: Dawn of Nemunas (since 2024)
- Other political affiliations: Homeland Union (2014–2023)

Mantas Poškus (born 16 September 1980) is a Lithuanian politician of the Dawn of Nemunas serving as a member of the Seimas since 2024. From 2014 to 2023, he was a member of the Homeland Union.
