= Daiva Petkevičienė =

Lithuanian politician (born 1964)

Member of the Seimas
- Incumbent
- Assumed office 14 November 2024
- Preceded by: Simonas Gentvilas
- Constituency: Pajūris

Personal details
- Born: 28 October 1964 (age 61)
- Party: Dawn of Nemunas (since 2023)

Daiva Petkevičienė (born 28 October 1964) is a Lithuanian politician of the Dawn of Nemunas serving as a member of the Seimas since 2024. She has served as a deputy leader of the party since 2023.
