= Dainoras Bradauskas =

Lithuanian politician (born 1965)

Member of the Seimas
- Incumbent
- Assumed office 14 November 2024

Personal details
- Born: 16 December 1965 (age 60)
- Party: Dawn of Nemunas

Dainoras Bradauskas (born 16 December 1965) is a Lithuanian economist and politician of the Dawn of Nemunas serving as a member of the Seimas since 2024. From 2015 to 2017, he served as head of the State Tax Inspectorate.
