= Kęstutis Bilius =

Lithuanian politician (born 1958)

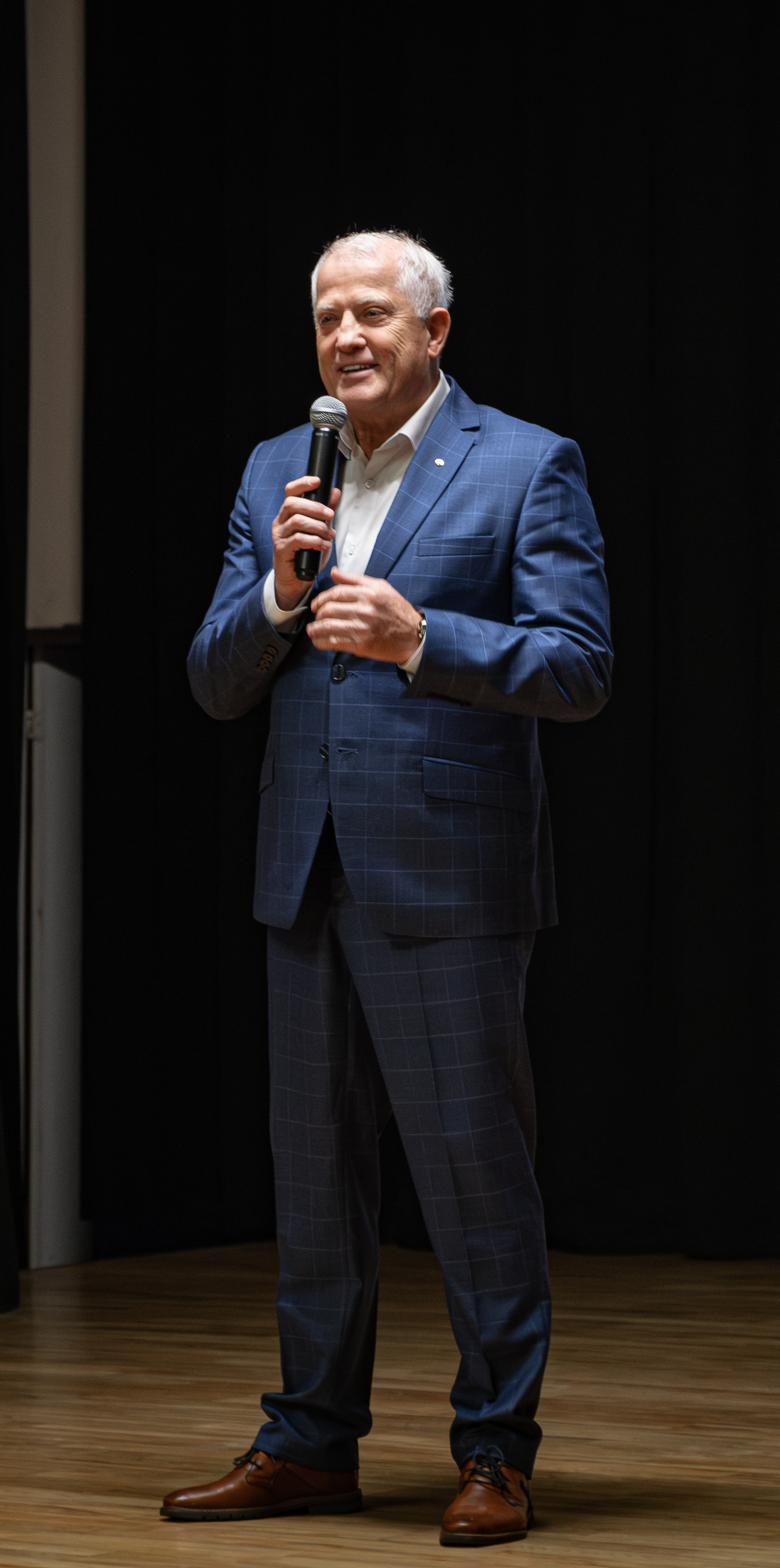
- Bilius in 2024

Member of the Seimas
- Incumbent
- Assumed office 14 November 2024

Personal details
- Born: 10 October 1958 (age 67)
- Party: Dawn of Nemunas (since 2023)

Kęstutis Bilius (born 10 October 1958) is a Lithuanian politician of the Dawn of Nemunas serving as a member of the Seimas since 2024. He has served as deputy mayor of Kelmė since 2023.
