= Lina Šukytė-Korsakė =

Lithuanian politician (born 1970)

Member of the Seimas
- Incumbent
- Assumed office 14 November 2024

Personal details
- Born: 17 November 1970 (age 55)
- Party: Dawn of Nemunas (since 2023)
- Other political affiliations: Order and Justice (2010–2019); Freedom and Justice (2019–2023)

Lina Šukytė-Korsakė (born 17 November 1970) is a Lithuanian politician of the Dawn of Nemunas serving as a member of the Seimas since 2024. She was appointed deputy mayor of Klaipėda following the 2023 municipal elections.
