= Aurelijus Veryga =

Lithuanian politician (born 1976)

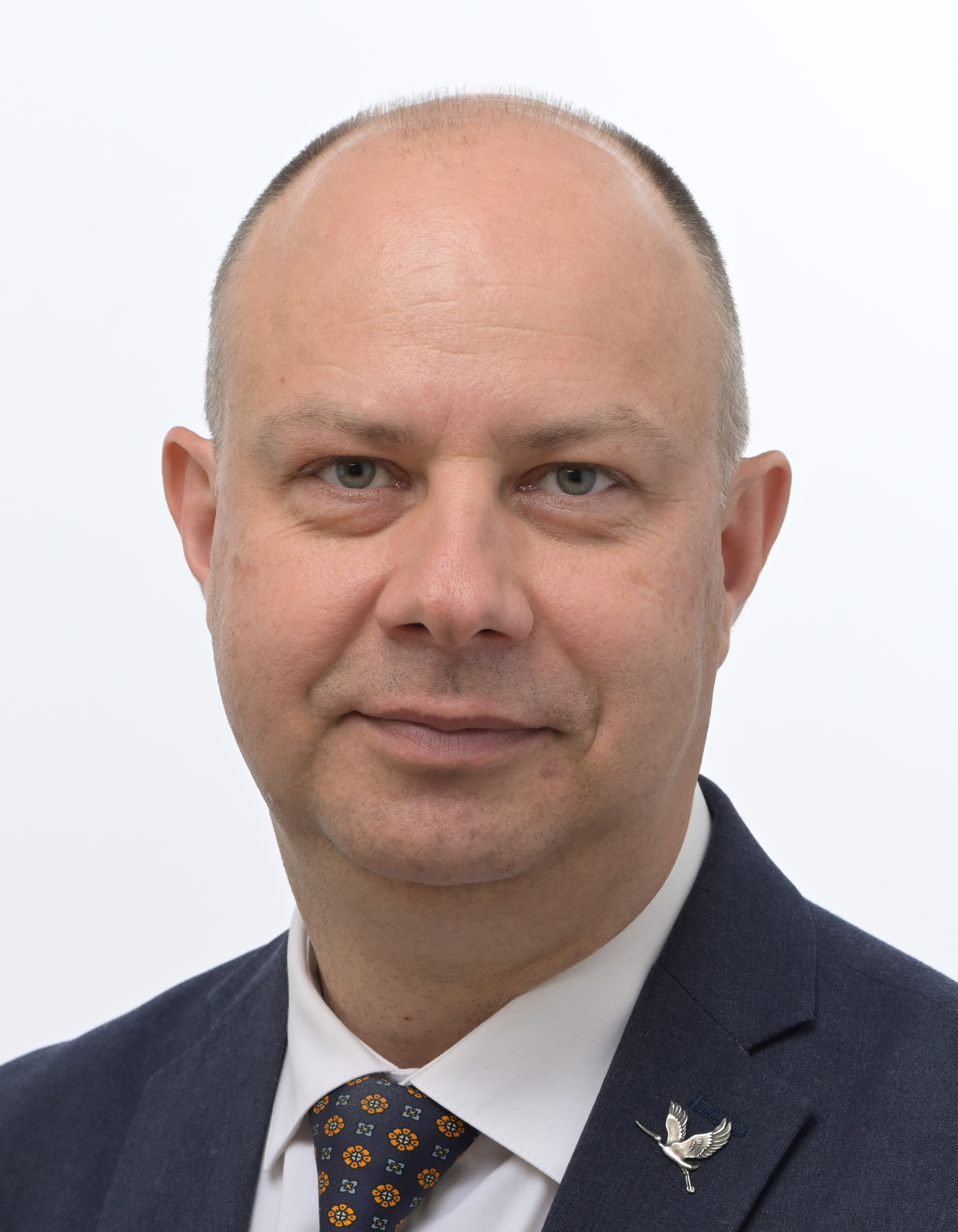

Member of the European Parliament for Lithuania
- Incumbent
- Assumed office 16 July 2024

Minister of Health of Lithuania
- In office 13 December 2016 – 11 December 2020
- Prime Minister: Saulius Skvernelis
- Preceded by: Juras Požela
- Succeeded by: Arūnas Dulkys

Member of the Seimas
- In office 13 November 2020 – 15 July 2024
- Succeeded by: Jekaterina Rojaka
- Constituency: Multi-member
- In office 14 November 2016 – 12 November 2020
- Preceded by: Vida Marija Čigriejienė
- Succeeded by: Gintarė Skaistė
- Constituency: Panemunė

Personal details
- Born: 8 August 1976 (age 49) Užventis, Lithuanian SSR, Soviet Union
- Party: Lithuanian Farmers and Greens Union
- Education: Lithuanian University of Health Sciences

Aurelijus Veryga (born 8 August 1976) is a Lithuanian politician who served as Minister of Health in the Skvernelis Cabinet led by Prime Minister Saulius Skvernelis from 13 December 2016 to 11 December 2020. He was elected to the European Parliament in the 2024 European Parliament election and belongs to the European Conservatives and Reformists Group.

In addition to his political work, Veryga serves on the Advisory Council on Innovation for Noncommunicable Diseases at the World Health Organization’s Regional Office for Europe, chaired by Hans Kluge.

Veryga was elected chairman of the Lithuanian Farmers and Greens Union in 2025, after the resignation of longtime leader Ramūnas Karbauskis.

Seimas
Preceded by Vida Marija Čigriejienė	Member of the Seimas for Panemunė; 2016–2020	Succeeded by Gintarė Skaistė
