= Kęstutis Vilkauskas =

Lithuanian politician (born 1969)

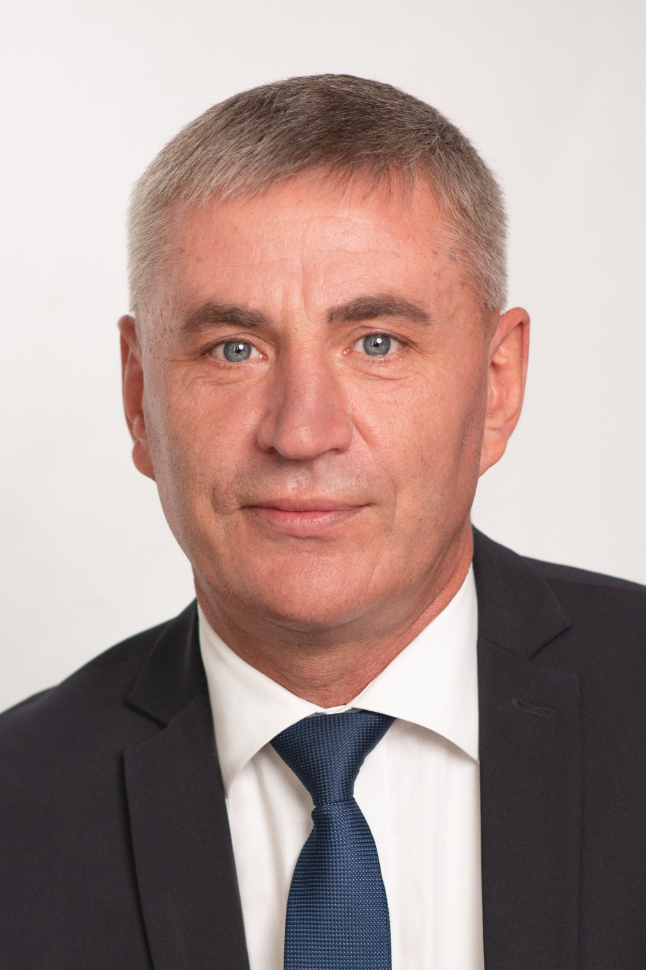

Member of the Seimas
- Incumbent
- Assumed office 13 November 2020
- Constituency: Trakai–Vievis

Chairman of the Seimas Culture Committee
- Incumbent
- Assumed office 21 November 2024
- Preceded by: Vytautas Juozapaitis

Personal details
- Born: 19 June 1969 (age 56)
- Party: Social Democratic Party

Kęstutis Vilkauskas (born 19 June 1969) is a Lithuanian politician of the Social Democratic Party serving a member of the Seimas since 2020. He has served as leader of the Social Democratic Party in the Trakai District Municipality since 2009.
