= Tomas Tomilinas =

Lithuanian politician

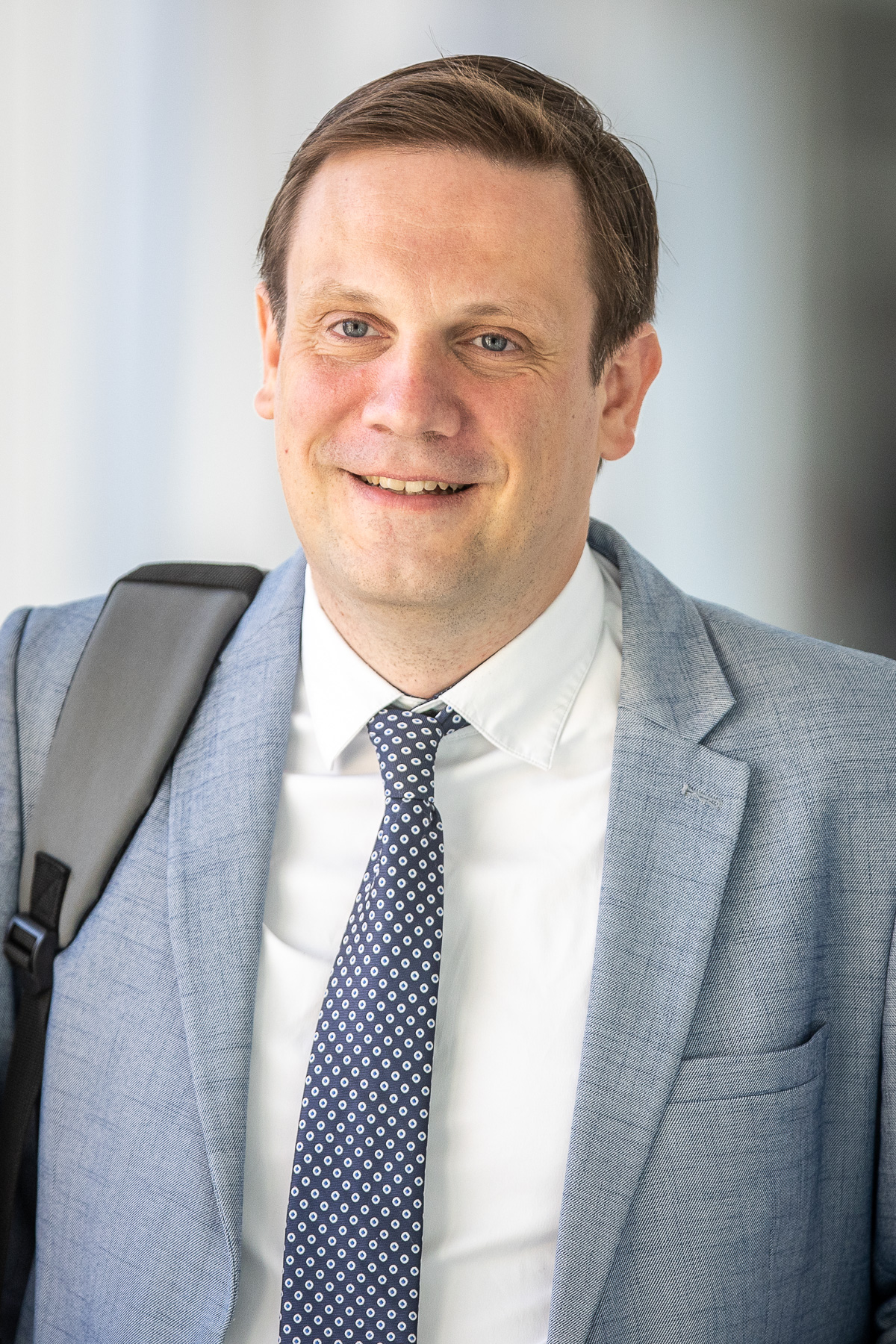
- Tomilinas in 2023

Member of the Seimas
- Incumbent
- Assumed office 14 November 2016
- Constituency: Multi-member (2016-2020); Deltuva North (2020-present)

Personal details
- Born: 22 April 1983 (age 42) Vilnius, Lithuania
- Party: Union of Democrats "For Lithuania" (2022–present)
- Other political affiliations: Lithuanian Farmers and Greens Union (2002-2021)
- Spouse: Kristina Tomilina
- Education: Vilnius University (BA); Mykolas Romeris University (MA)

Tomas Tomilinas (born 22 April 1983) is a Lithuanian trade unionist and politician of Polish origin. He was elected to the Seimas with the Lithuanian Farmers and Greens Union in 2016, but was expelled from the party in 2021 and joined the Union of Democrats "For Lithuania".

== Background ==
Tomilinas was born in Vilnius in 1983 to a Polish mother and Russian father. He graduated from Vilnius University with a bachelor's degree in political science in 2005 and from Mykolas Romeris University with a master's degree in public administration in 2007.

He speaks five languages: Lithuanian, English, Polish, Russian, and Belarusian.

He helped establish the Trade Union of Commercial Workers (Lithuanian: Prekybos darbuotojų profesinė sąjunga) in 2007. He was one of the founding members of the Social Investment Management Centre, a public organization which promotes trade unions, education on ecology and climate change, socially responsible investing, and human rights, and a founder of the left-wing progressive think-tank DEMOS.

He has been married twice. He met his second wife, Kristina Juozapavičiūtė, in their political party.

== Political career ==
Tomilinas joined the Union of Peasants and New Democratic Parties, the predecessor of the Lithuanian Farmers and Greens Union, in 2002. In 2010, he established the Greens Group within the party (then still known as the Peasant Popular Union).

He was an assistant to Member of the Seimas Laima Mogenienė from 2004 to 2008 and assistant to Member of the Seimas Antanas Baura from 2008 to 2012. From 2012 to 2016, he was head of the office of European Parliament member Bronius Ropė. He was also a coordinator of the 2012 Lithuanian nuclear power referendum. In the 2016 Lithuanian parliamentary election, he ran in the Paneriai constituency, but lost to Linas Balsys. However, he entered parliament through the party's multi-member constituency list. He became the deputy chair of the Seimas Social Affairs and Labour Committee.

In 2017, he proposed blocking the Lithuanian Free Market Institute from sending letters to members of the Seimas. He came in conflict with his party over taxation reform in 2018 and his proposal to introduce a 20 percent VAT rate on personal income from capital, which was opposed by the rest of the party. He proposed establishing a five percent quota for disabled persons in public institutions in 2018.

Tomilinas was reelected in the 2020 Lithuanian parliamentary election in the constituency of Deltuva north, which includes the town of Anykščiai and surrounding regions. His relationship with the rest of the party became tense after the election as it turned towards the right on social issues, proclaiming its alignment with family values and opposing expansion of LGBT rights in Lithuania. He also came into conflict with Ramūnas Karbauskis over differing views on human rights. After Tomilinas voted in favor of same-sex partnerships in 2021, he was removed from all of his positions in the party. He joined the Democrats Parliamentary Group, led by Saulius Skvernelis and formed from former members of LVŽS, in September 2021. The group established the Union of Democrats "For Lithuania" in 2022.

In January 2022, at the founding congress of the Union of Democrats "For Lithuania", he was elected deputy chairman of the party.

In the 2024 Lithuanian parliamentary elections, he was elected to the Seimas through the multi-member constituency as a candidate of the Union of Democrats "For Lithuania". He also ran in the single-member Deltuva North constituency.

In 2025, he was elected a member of the Committee of the European Green Party.

In the Seimas, he focuses primarily on representing the economic interests of working families, low-income residents, and small businesses. He also initiated a financial support program for housing for young families, aimed at strengthening regions.

== Other activities ==
In 2021, Tomilinas published the book “A book not for children: 9 myths about life between carnival and lent”, in which he analyzes contemporary Lithuanian political and social processes and challenges widespread myths and stereotypes that hinder the development of a welfare state.
