= Union of Democrats "For Lithuania" =

Union of Democrats "For Lithuania" Demokratų sąjunga „Vardan Lietuvos“
- Abbreviation: DSVL
- Chairperson: Virginijus Sinkevičius
- Vice Chairpeople: Linas Kukuraitis; Virginijus Sinkevičius; Jekaterina Rojaka; Lukas Savickas; Tomas Tomilinas; Domas Griškevičius
- Founded: 29 January 2022
- Split from: Lithuanian Farmers and Greens Union
- Membership: ▼3,368 (2022)
- Ideology: Green politics; Green conservatism; Social democracy
- Political position: Centre-left
- European affiliation: European Green Party
- European Parliament group: Greens–European Free Alliance
- Colours: Blue
- Seimas: 13 / 141
- European Parliament: 1 / 11
- Municipal councils: 124 / 1,498
- Mayors: 5 / 60

Website
- demokratai.lt

The Union of Democrats "For Lithuania" (Lithuanian: Demokratų sąjunga „Vardan Lietuvos“; DSVL) is a centre-left and green Lithuanian political party founded on 29 January 2022 by Saulius Skvernelis, former Prime Minister of Lithuania. The party is moderately socially conservative.

Most of the party's members are former members of the Lithuanian Farmers and Greens Union. The party's name "For Lithuania" (Lithuanian: Vardan Lietuvos, literally For the sake of Lithuania) is a reference to the final line of the national anthem of Lithuania, Tautiška giesmė. The Union of Democrats became a member of the European Green Party and ran in the 2024 European Parliament election in Lithuania, winning one seat to the European Parliament. The party campaigns on environmental issues as well as redistributive socioeconomic policies.

== History ==
=== Foundation ===
Saulius Skvernelis was appointed Prime Minister of Lithuania on 22 November 2016, supported by the Lithuanian Farmers and Greens Union and Social Democratic Party of Lithuania, and formed the Skvernelis Cabinet. Though elected to the Seimas in the 2016 election on the Farmer-Green list, he was an independent, and his conflict with the party's chairman Ramūnas Karbauskis led to speculation that he intended to form his own political party. In 2019, the Centre of Registers registered the name "Political Party 'For the Fatherland'" (Lithuanian: Politinė partija „Tėvynės labui“), which was Skvernelis' election slogan during the 2019 presidential election, further fueling speculation.

The Farmer-Greens lost the 2020 parliamentary election. Skvernelis and Karbauskis disagreed over the party's role as leader of the opposition, as well as the composition of their shadow cabinet, which Karbauskis sought to staff with party members loyal to him, leading to renewed speculation of an impending party split. On 7 September 2021, Skvernelis and ten other members left the Farmer-Green parliamentary group and proclaimed the formation of the Democrats – For Lithuania parliamentary group (Lithuanian: Demokratai – vardan Lietuvos). They cited their opposition to the party's aggressive opposition stance and stated their interest to work as a constructive opposition. Independent, previously Social Democratic parliamentarians Algirdas Butkevičius and Domas Griškevičius also joined the group.

The group announced its intention to reorganize into a political party, which caused numerous branches of the Farmer-Greens, as well as the mayors of Lazdijai, Šilutė and Neringa to leave the party and declare their intention to join. It was also joined by former Minister of Environment Kęstutis Mažeika and European Commissioner Virginijus Sinkevičius. The party was founded on 29 January 2022, in a founding conference in Palanga.

=== Activity ===
Immediately after foundation, DSVL became one of the leading parties in popularity polls, while the Farmer-Greens and the Labour Party both declined. Over time, its support plateaued and slightly shrank due to competition with the Social Democrats. It is one of three leading opposition parties in the Thirteenth Seimas of Lithuania.

In the 2023 municipal elections, the party won 6.68 percent of the vote, somewhat underperforming in comparison to the polls and ending up below the Farmers-Greens and the Social Democrats. Its strongest showings were in municipalities whose mayors and branches had defected to the party in 2021 and 2022. It fielded a candidate in a by-election in the Raseniai-Kėdainiai constituency on 3 September 2023, but finished the worst of all the candidates, at 2.48 percent of the vote.

On 17 June 2023, it announced its decision to seek to join the European Green Party. It joined officially in February 2024. The party participated in the 2024 European Parliament election in Lithuania, earning 5.95% of the popular vote and winning a single seat in the European Parliament (out of 11 Lithuanian ones). This was considered a success for the party, given how the party was only two years old at the time of the 2024 European Parliament election.

In the 2024 parliamentary election, DSVL finished in fourth place, securing 14 out of 141 total seats in the Fourteenth Seimas. Lithuanian Social Democratic Party formed a ruling coalition with DSVL and populist party Dawn of Nemunas. As being agreed on in the coalition treaty, Skvernelis was elected the Speaker of the Seimas on 14 November 2024, with 107 votes in favour and 19 against.

== Ideology ==
The party describes itself as being centre-left on economic policy and socially conservative on socio-cultural issues. It supports guaranteed minimum income, strengthening the traditional family, achieving climate neutrality by 2045 and decentralization. In its program, it defines itself as centre-left, but maintains its focus on family values. It is a member of the European Green Party and focuses on environmentalism and green politics, as well as centre-left socioeconomic issues.

The Union of Democrats is considered to be ideologically heterodox, and its founding members include former members of almost every previously existing Lithuanian political party. Many of its vice-chairpeople, including Ausma Miškinienė, Lukas Savickas, and Vytautas Bakas were close allies of Skvernelis in the Skvernelis Cabinet. This has led to claims that the party was founded out of political opportunism and does not have an ideology beyond being elected to parliament.

== Election results ==
=== Seimas ===
Election	Leader	Votes	%	Seats	+/–	Government
2024	Saulius Skvernelis	114,792	9.40 (#4)	14 / 141	▲14	Coalition (2024–2025)
2024	Saulius Skvernelis	114,792	9.40 (#4)	14 / 141	▲14	Opposition (2025−2026)
2024	Saulius Skvernelis	114,792	9.40 (#4)	14 / 141	▲14	Coalition (since 2026)

==== by-elections ====
Election	Candidate	Votes	%	Result
2023 Raseiniai-Kėdainiai	Edvinas Demidavičius	230	2.48 (#8)	Defeated
2026 Nalšios Šiaurinės	Antanas Šakalis	TBD	TBD	TBD

=== European Parliament ===
Election	List leader	Votes	%	Seats	+/–	EP Group
2024	Virginijus Sinkevičius	40,351	5.95 (#5)	1 / 11	New	Greens/EFA

=== Municipal ===
Election	Votes (Note: Municipal council election votes.)	%	Council seats	Mayors	+/–
2023	78,052	6.68 (#5)	124 / 1,498	5 / 60	
