= Ramūnas Karbauskis =

Lithuanian businessman and politician (born 1969)

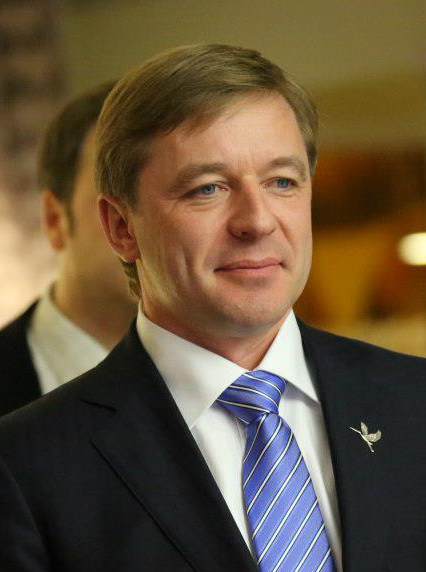
- Karbauskis in 2016

Member of the Seimas
- In office 13 November 2020 – 24 November 2020
- Succeeded by: Asta Kubilienė
- Constituency: Multi-member
- In office 14 November 2016 – 13 November 2020
- Preceded by: Rimantas Jonas Dagys
- Succeeded by: Jurgita Šiugždinienė
- Constituency: Šilainiai
- In office 25 November 1996 – 18 October 2004
- Preceded by: Mindaugas Stakvilevičius
- Succeeded by: Rima Baškienė
- Constituency: Šiauliai countryside

Chairman of the Farmers and Greens Union
- In office 15 April 2009 – 1 March 2025
- Preceded by: Kazimira Prunskienė
- Succeeded by: Aurelijus Veryga

Deputy Chairman of the Speaker of the Seimas
- In office 24 November 2000 – 15 May 2001
- Succeeded by: Vytenis Andriukaitis

Personal details
- Born: 5 December 1969 (age 56) Naisiai, Soviet-occupied Lithuania
- Party: Independent (Before 1998); Peasants Party (1998–2001); Farmers and Greens Union (2001–present)
- Spouse: Lina Karbauskienė
- Children: 2
- Education: Lithuanian Academy of Agriculture

Ramūnas Karbauskis (born 5 December 1969) is a Lithuanian businessman and politician.

== Biography ==
=== Education and business career ===
Born on 5 December 1969 in Naisiai, Karbauskis graduated from Julius Janonis secondary school in Šiauliai in 1987. The same year, he enrolled into the Faculty of Agronomy at the Lithuanian Academy of Agriculture, graduating in 1992.

As a youth, Karbauskis had an active interest in draughts (or checkers), becoming a candidate for Master (qualification degree) in International and Russian draughts. During 1987–1988 he was a member of Lithuanian Youth National Team of Russian draughts.

In 1993, Karbauskis launched a company Agrokoncernas, acting as its CEO. Over the following two decades, Agrokoncernas grew to become one of the largest agricultural groups in Lithuania, employing more than 800 people. Karbauskis retained full ownership of the company, making him one of the richest men in Lithuania.

=== Political career ===
Participating in politics since mid-1990s, Karbauskis has been elected to the national parliament, the Seimas, on three occasions.

In the elections of 1996, he ran as an independent and was elected to the Seventh Seimas in the single-seat constituency of Šiauliai (rural) (45). In 1998 he joined the Lithuanian Peasants Party (LVP) and became its chairman. In 1997 and 2000 he also served on the council of Šiauliai district municipality.

In the elections of 2000 Karbauskis was reelected in his single-seat constituency, representing LVP. In the Eighth Seimas, he served as the deputy speaker between 2000 and 2001.

Since 2009, Karbauskis has been the Chairman of Lithuanian Peasant Popular Union, renamed to Lithuanian Farmers and Greens Union in 2012. The party won 2016 parliamentary elections in Lithuania. Karbauskis himself won a seat in the parliament in the single-member constituency of Šilainiai (in Kaunas).

Karbauskis was one of the organizers of the 2014 Lithuanian constitutional referendum, which sought to prohibit the ownership of land in Lithuania to foreign citizens, in violation of Lithuania's terms of membership in the European Union. At the congress of the Lithuanian Peasants and Greens Union held on March 1, 2025, he refused to run for the post of party chairman for the next term. He publicly announced his withdrawal from political activity. On March 3, 2025 Ramūnas Karbauskis terminated his membership in the Lithuanian Peasants and Greens Union.

=== Philanthropy and social engagement ===
Karbauskis has launched Naisiai family festival (an alcohol-free, outdoor summer entertainment festival). He is also a writer and producer of TV series The Summer of Naisiai (Lithuanian: Naisių vasara), based on stories from Naisiai village where Karbauskis was born.

In 2013, Karbauskis co-founded the charity Let's Educate Children (Lithuanian: Švieskime vaikus), in cooperation with Lithuanian singer and producer Andrius Mamontovas.

Karbauskis has been the President of Lithuanian Draughts Federation since 2006 and the Vice-President of the Lithuanian Žemaitukas (a historic horse breed from Lithuania) Association from 2009.

=== Allegations of illicit business practices ===
A media investigation into Ramūnas Karbauskis's company Agrokoncernas revealed that Karbauskis and his family have been using shell companies to circumvent an anti-monopoly regulatory restriction on how much land one entity can own. Furthermore, it is asserted that Agrokoncernas has exploited this to receive additional funding from the EU.

The investigation also shows that Karbauskis has used company finances to build his personal residence (instead of taking dividends from his company, for which he would have had to pay taxes).

== Personal life ==
Karbauskis is married and has two sons, Justinas and Mantas, with his wife Lina. His brother, Mindaugas Karbauskis is stage director in the Moscow Mayakovsky Theatre.

Karbauskis is divorced from his first wife Jūratė.

Karbauskis supports Lithuanian paganism and has invited the neo-pagan movement Romuva to Naisiai to host events and celebrations, although he is not a member of the movement. The movement's high priestess Inija Trinkūnienė endorsed Karbauskis and his political party.

Seimas
Preceded by Rimantas Jonas Dagys	Member of the Seimas for Šilainiai; 2016–2020	Succeeded by Jurgita Šiugždinienė
Preceded by Mindaugas Stakvilevičius	Member of the Seimas for Šiauliai rural constituency 1996–2004	Succeeded by Rima Baškienė
Party political offices
Preceded by Kazimira Prunskienė	Leader of the Farmers and Greens Union; 2009–present	Incumbent
