= Staugaitis =

Staugaitis is a Lithuanian surname. Notable people with the surname include:

- Jonas Staugaitis (1868–1952), Lithuanian physician, politician and acting President of Lithuania
- Justinas Staugaitis (1866–1943), Lithuanian Roman Catholic bishop, politician, educator and writer
