= Historical Presidential Palace, Kaunas =

Historical Presidential Palace
- Istorinė Prezidentūra (Lithuanian)
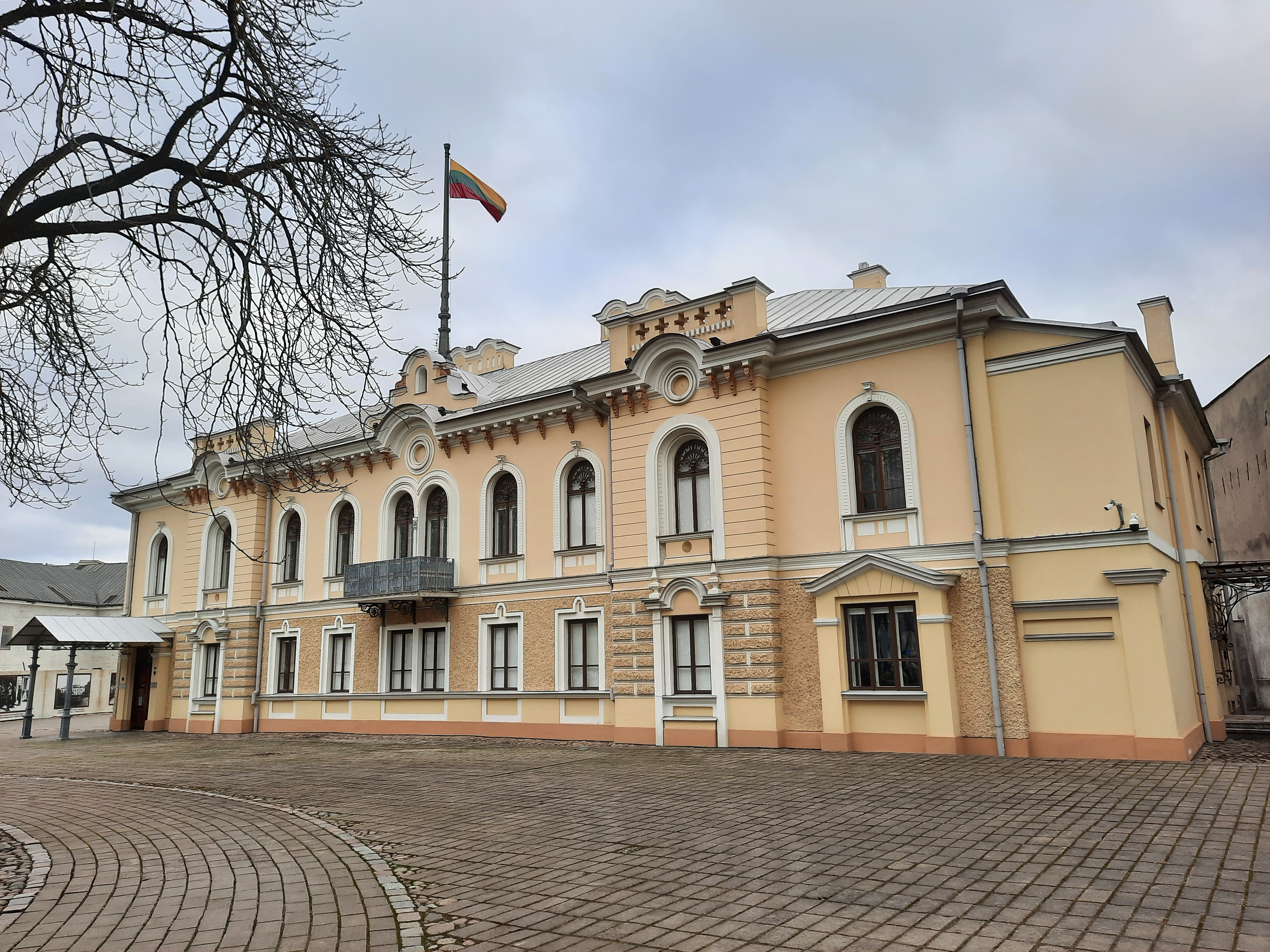
- Historical Presidential Palace in 2022

- Location within Lithuania
- Interactive map of Historical Presidential Palace
- 54°53′51″N 23°53′50″E
- Type: Presidential Palace
- Location: Kaunas, Lithuania

History
- Built: 1846
- Built for: Flora Čechavičienė

Site notes
- Architect(s): Fiodaras Vinteris; Edmundas von Mikvicas
- Architectural style: Baroque Revival
- Owner: M. K. Čiurlionis National Art Museum
- Website: istorineprezidentura.lt

Cultural Monuments of Lithuania
- Type: National
- Designated: 9 October 2003
- Reference no.: 16588

The Historical Presidential Palace (Lithuanian: Istorinė Prezidentūra) is a Neo-baroque building in the Old Town of Kaunas, Lithuania that served as the Presidential Palace during the interwar years. Today, the palace is a branch of the M. K. Čiurlionis National Art Museum.

== History ==
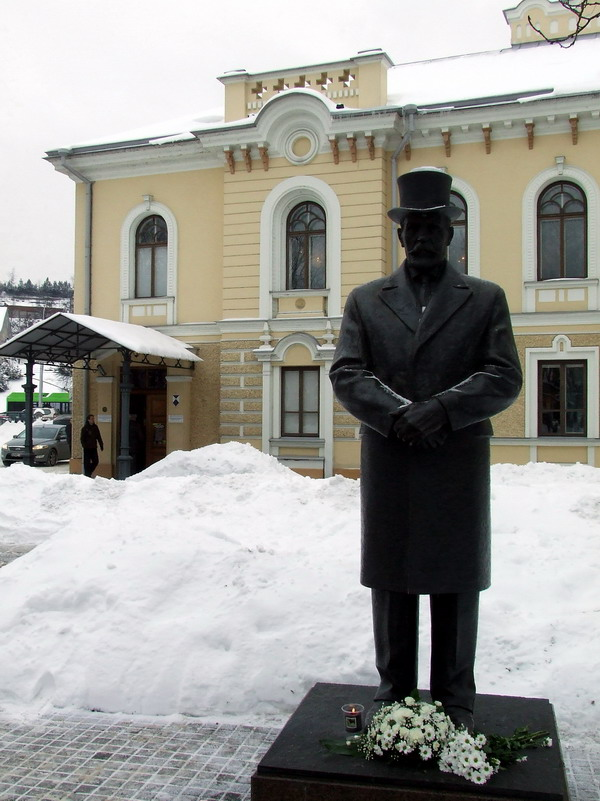
Antanas Smetona Monument

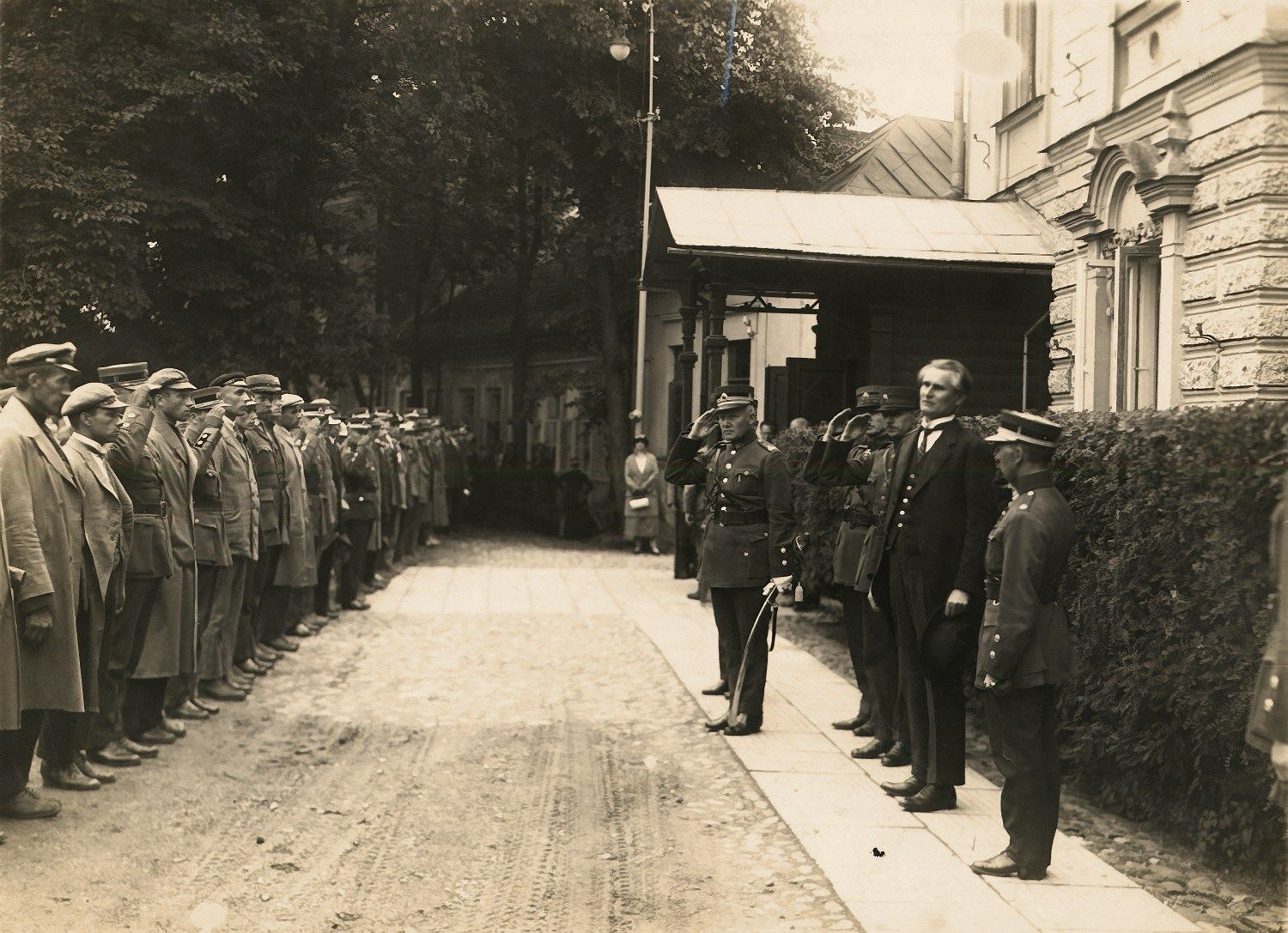
President Kazys Grinius near the Presidential Palace, 1926

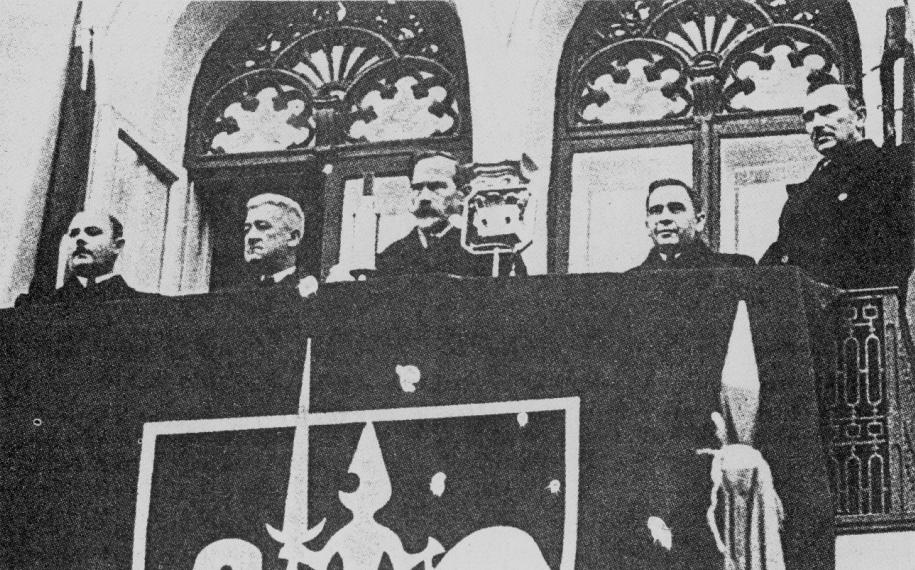
Antanas Smetona speaking from the balcony of the Presidential Palace

The original palace was constructed on in 1846, when a local aristocrat received authorization to build the two-story edifice. The project featured a symmetrically designed structure with seven rooms on the first floor, and nine rooms on the second floor. Shortly afterwards the building was expanded and another portal was added. In 1866, a garden was also laid out in front of the building. Two years later, additional structures were built nearby, and the building was acquired by the Russian government as a residence for the Kovno Governor. In 1876, the building was finally purchased by that government. During the latter part of the 19th century the building underwent further expansion, and an additional wing was constructed as well as a new gallery. During World War I, Kaiser Wilhelm II briefly stayed in the palace in 1915 while visiting the Eastern front.

Lithuania restored its independence in 1918, and at that time the building became the property of the Lithuanian government. After Lithuania's capital, Vilnius, was occupied by Poland, Kaunas became the temporary capital and the building was designated as its Presidential Palace. It was remodeled and became the Lithuanian president's official residence. The building witnessed a crisis of parliamentarism, the Coup d’État of 1926, and a turn towards authoritarian regime. The garden was surrounded by a cast-iron fence that has survived to this day. The palace served as the presidential residence until 1940, when Lithuania again lost its independence. In the face of imminent Soviet occupation, the Last Meeting of the government of Lithuania took place here on the night from June 14 to 15, 1940.

During Soviet rule, the palace underwent further alterations and the size of the garden was reduced, while some adjacent buildings were demolished. On the first floor, some interior walls were removed to make way for a movie theater. Later it was converted to the Kaunas teacher's headquarters, and hosted teacher's organizations.

In 1989, the administration of the palace was transferred to the Vytautas the Great War Museum. After Lithuania regained its independence from the Soviet Union in 1991, the palace was designated as a historical landmark. Soon afterward, three statues of the interwar presidents of Lithuania were erected in the palace garden, Antanas Smetona, Aleksandras Stulginskis, and Kazys Grinius. In 1997, more renovations were implemented, but due to financial problems, the work took six years to complete. In 2003, the 85th anniversary of Lithuanian Independence, the renovated palace was officially re-opened. The total cost of the works exceeded five million litas.

== Palace today ==
Today, the palace is used by the city and the state. There was a suggestion that the palace should become a branch of the Presidential Institution in Vilnius, but this suggestion has been rejected. Since 2005, the building has been a part of the M. K. Čiurlionis National Art Museum.

Currently, the palace features several exhibitions dedicated to former presidents Aleksandras Stulginskis and Kazys Grinius, and to the history of the palace. A recent exposition featured unique historical items from the collection of ambassador Kazys Lozoraitis.

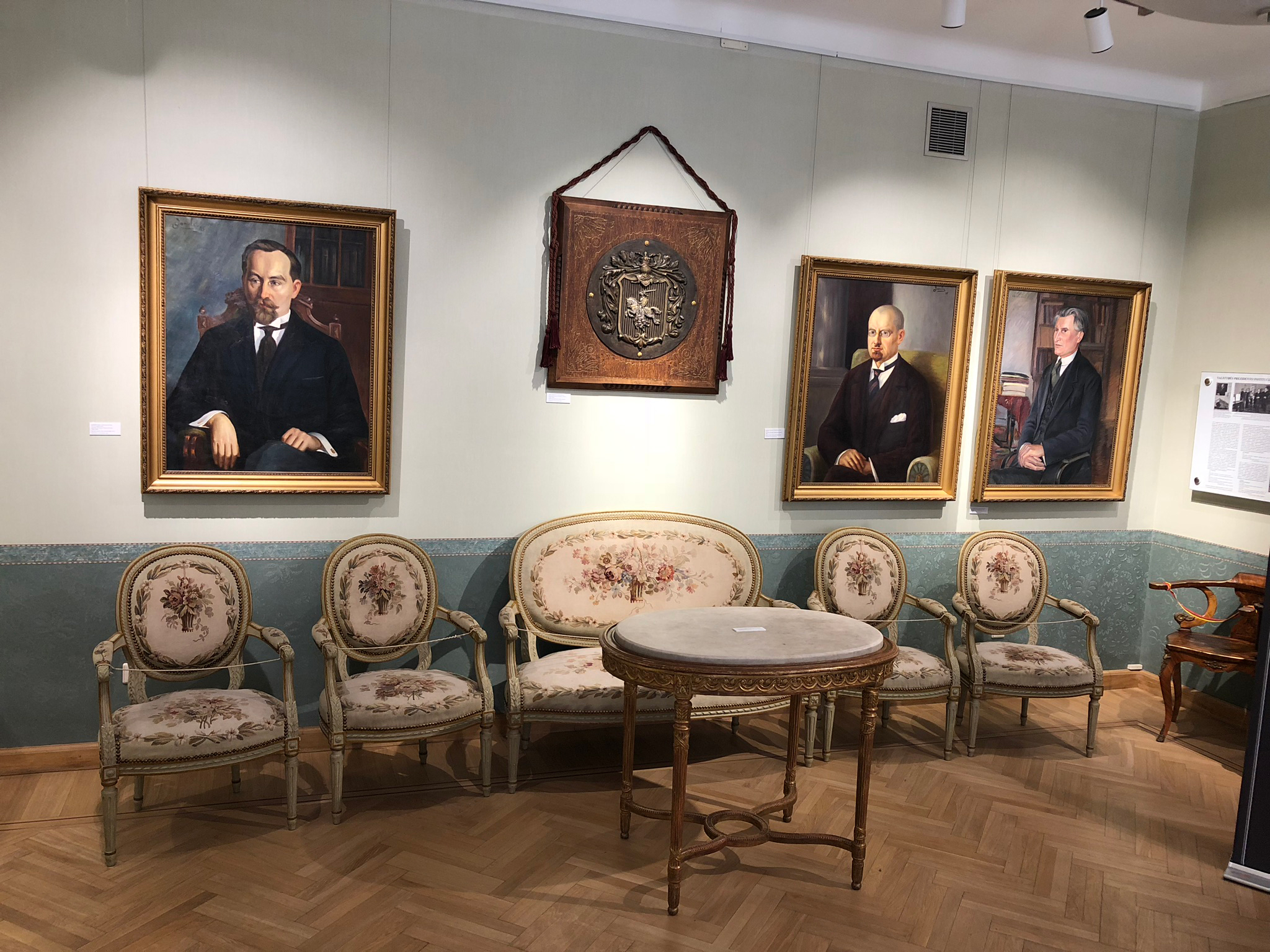
First floor room with three inter-war Presidents of Lithuania paintings

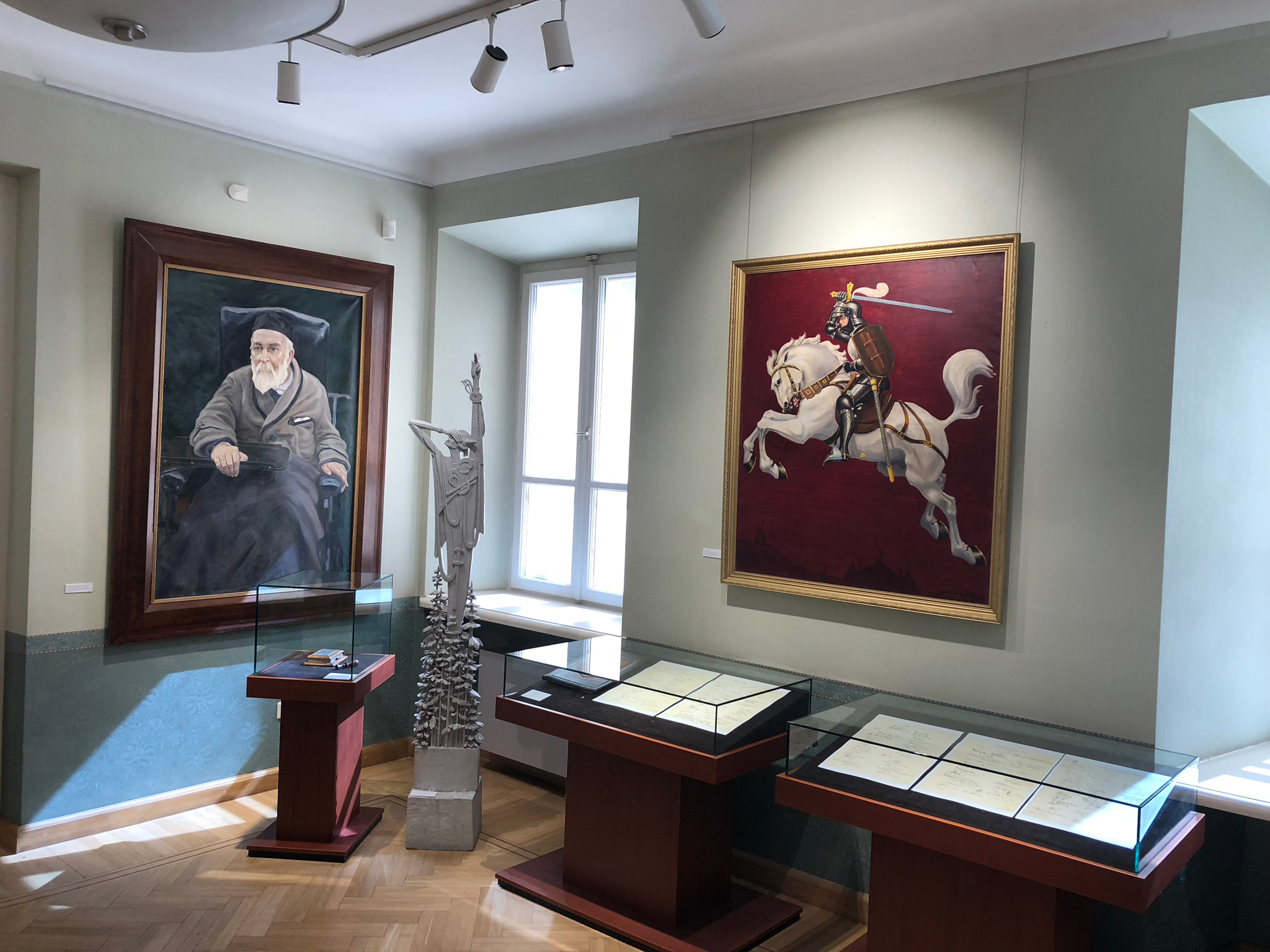
First floor room with Jonas Jablonskis and Vytis paintings

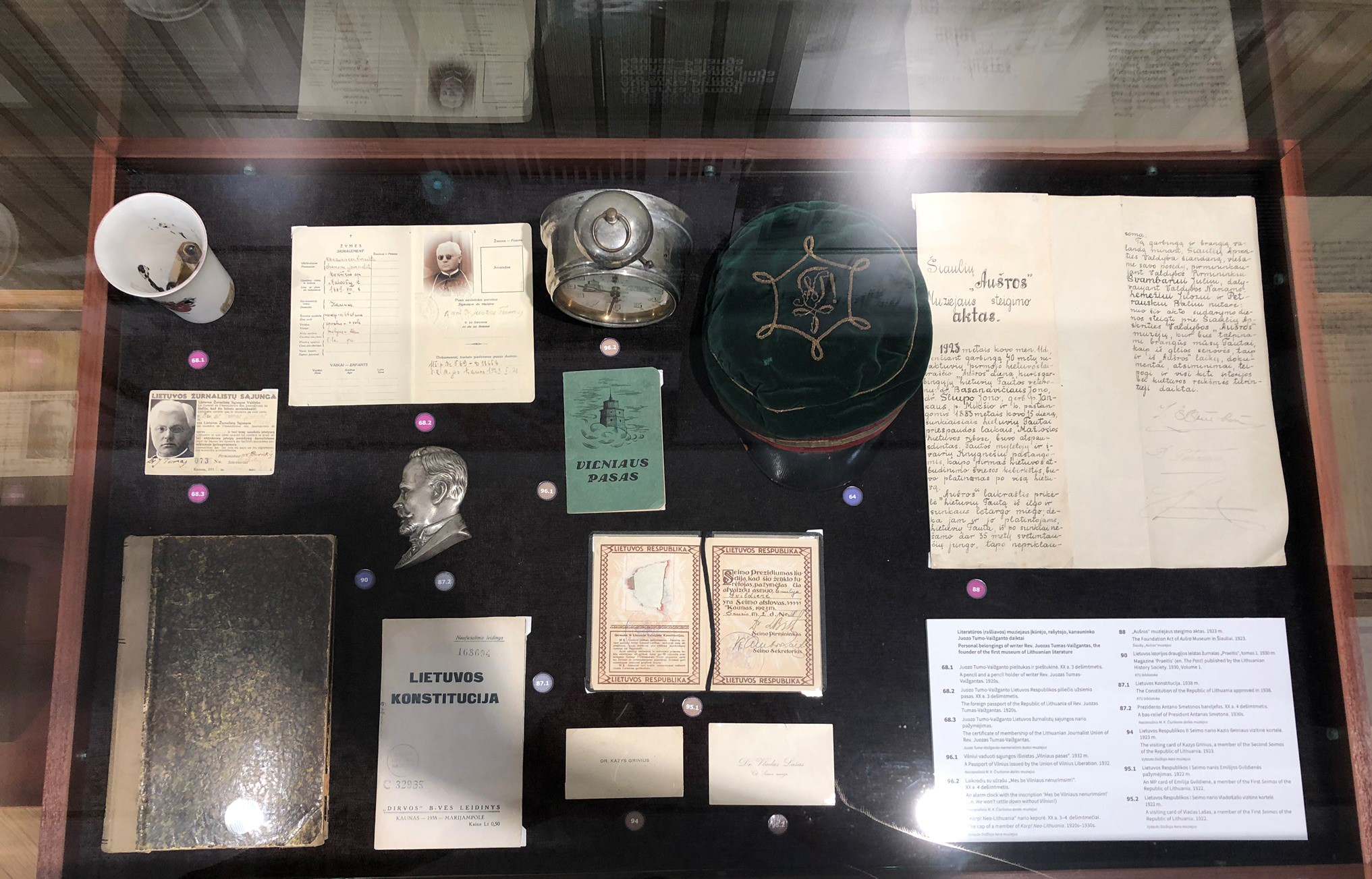
First floor exhibits

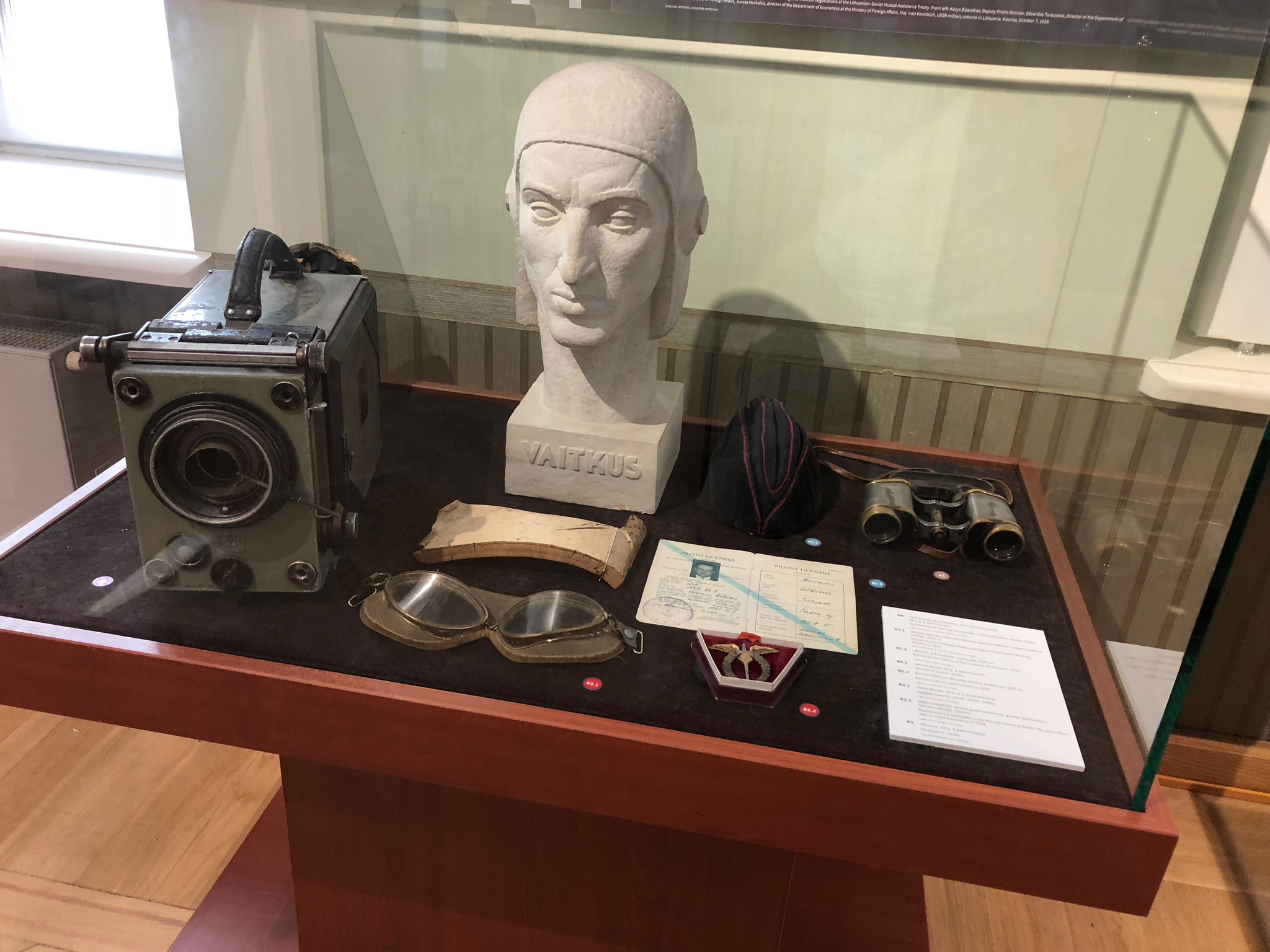
Feliksas Vaitkus belongings

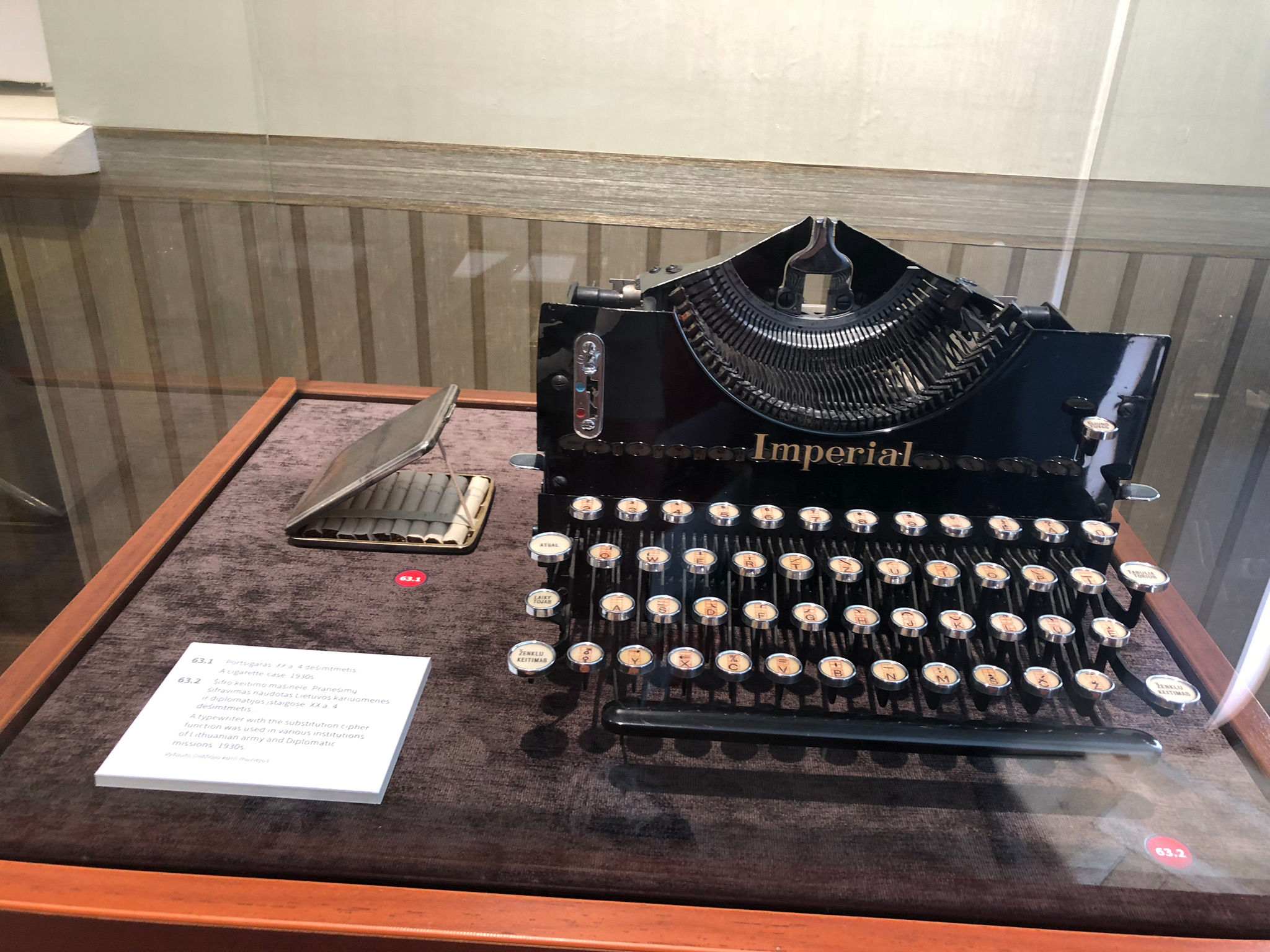
A typewriter with the substitution cipher function, used by various institutions of Lithuanian Army and Diplomatic missions in 1930s

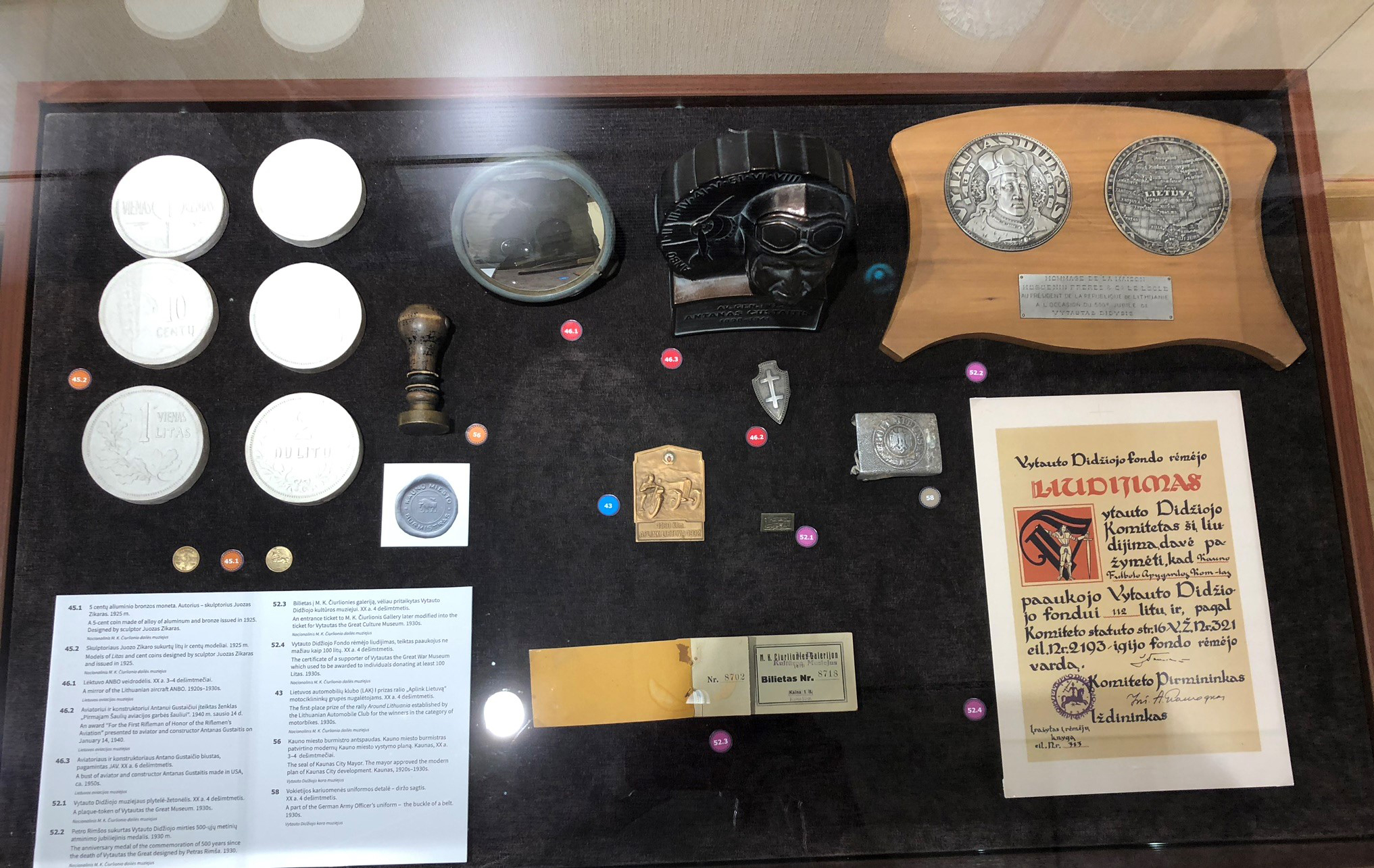
First floor exhibits

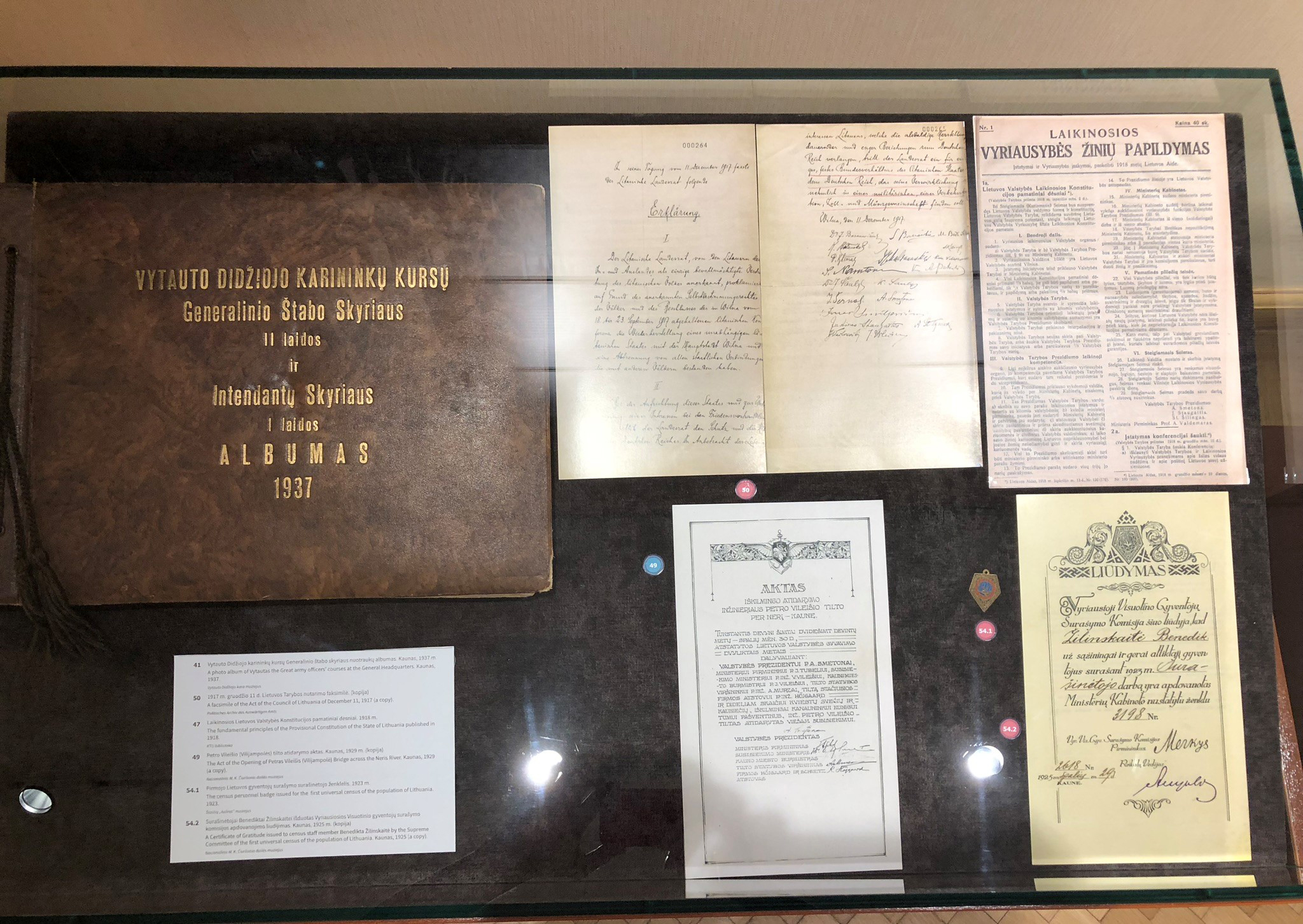
First floor exhibits

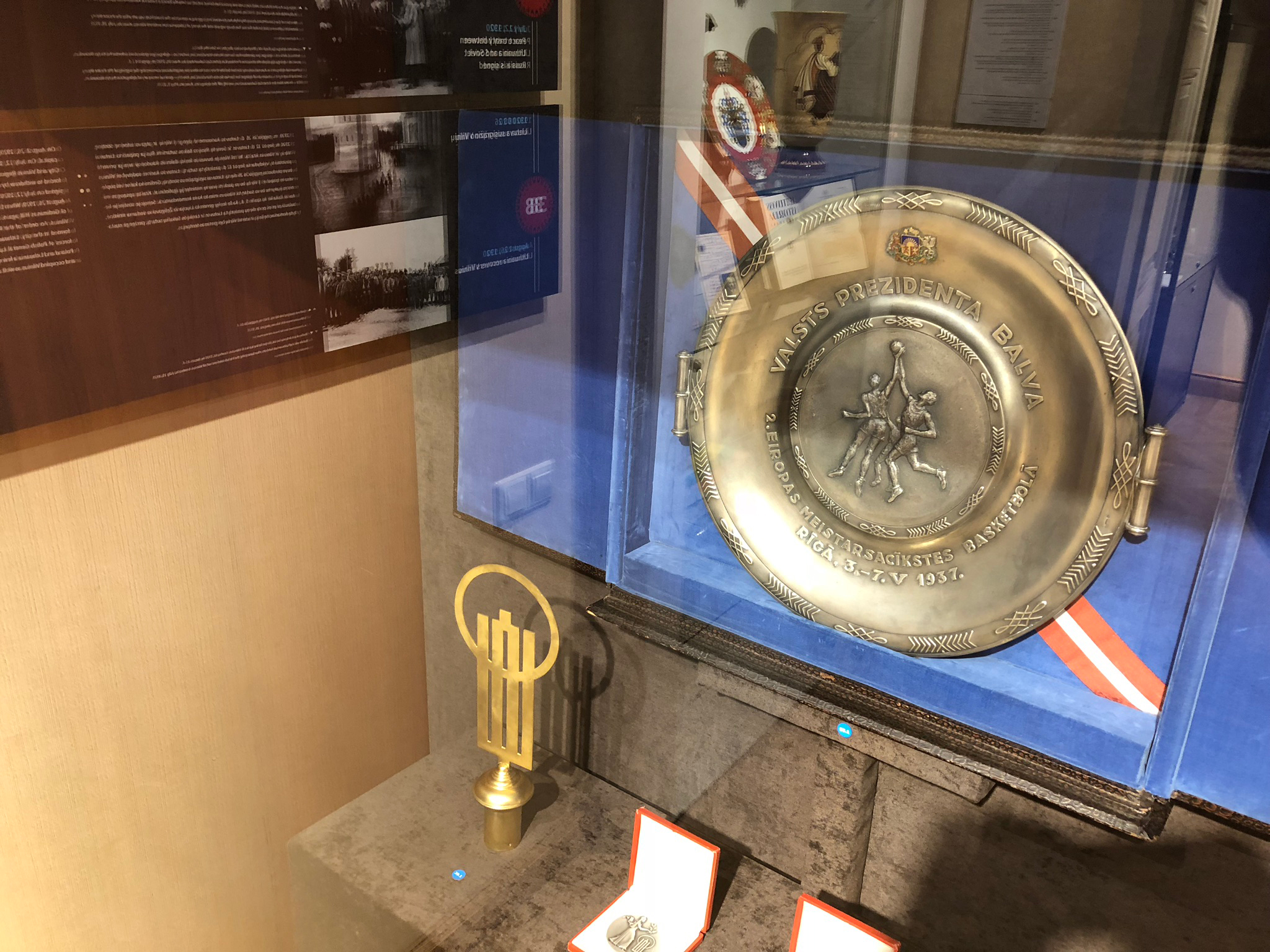
EuroBasket 1937 trophy

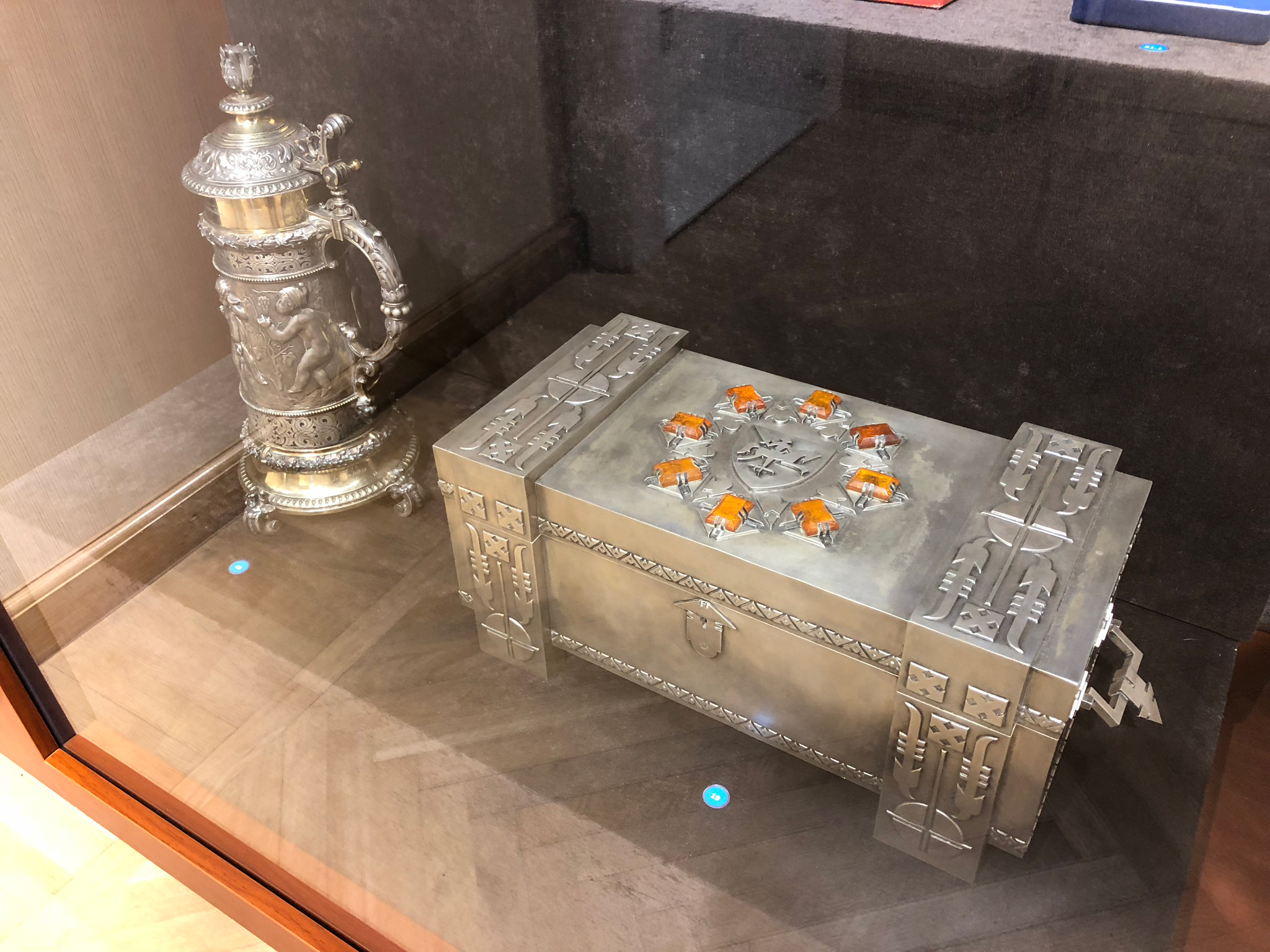
EuroBasket 1938 Women and EuroBasket 1939 trophies

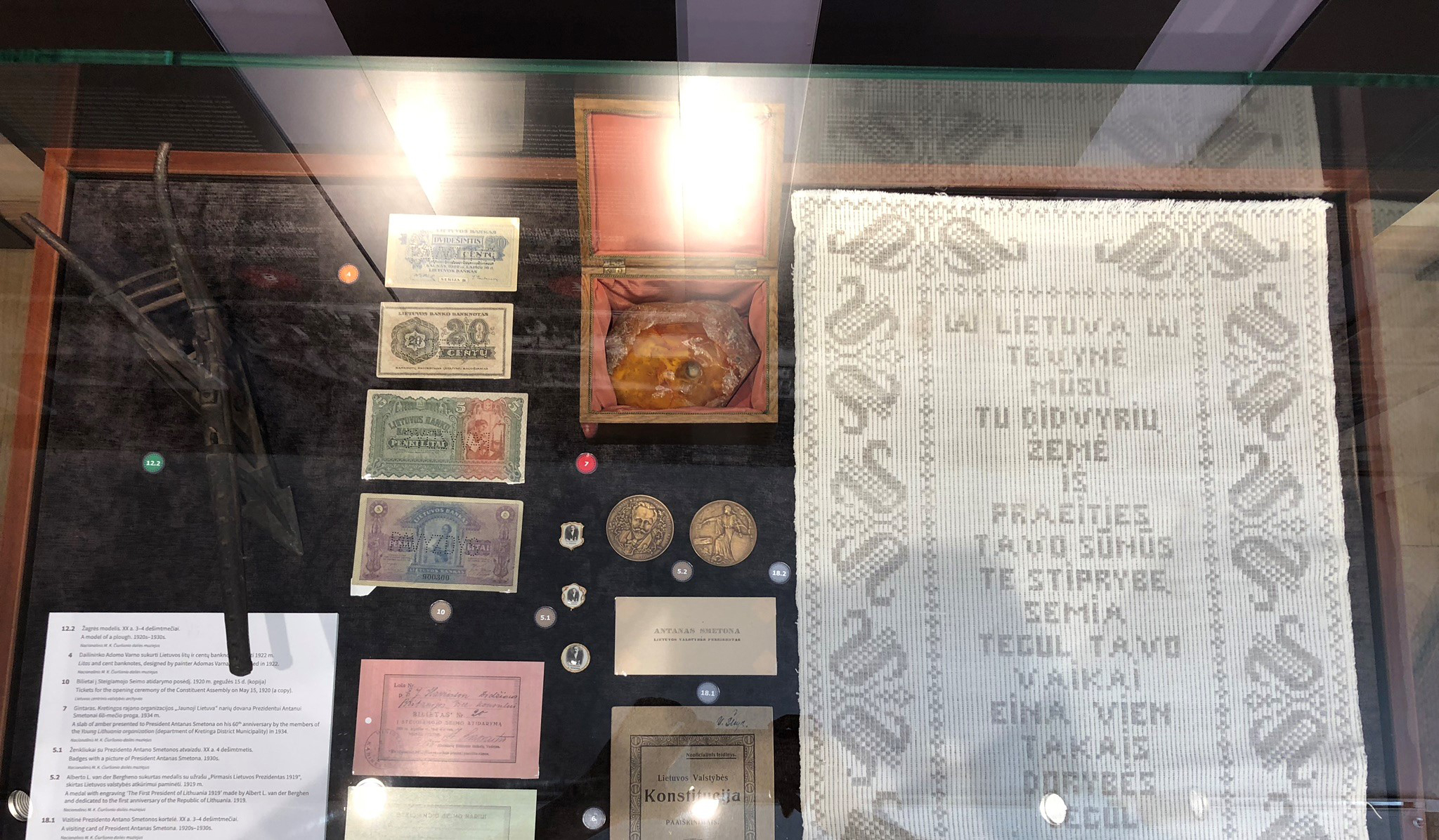
Inter-war version of the Lithuanian currency Litas and inter-war Constitution of Lithuania

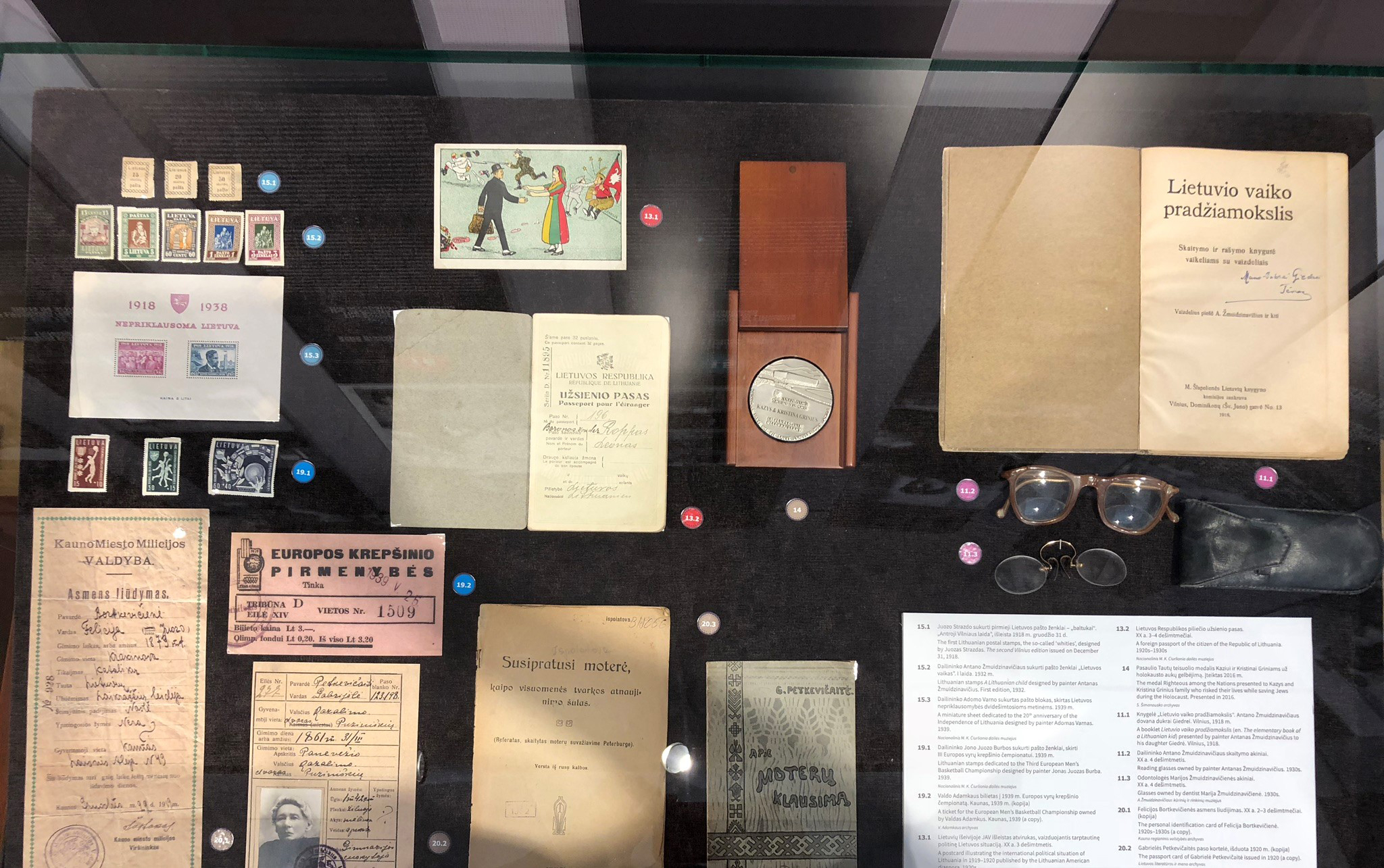
Lithuanian inter-war postage stamps and authentic ticket to a basketball game in EuroBasket 1939

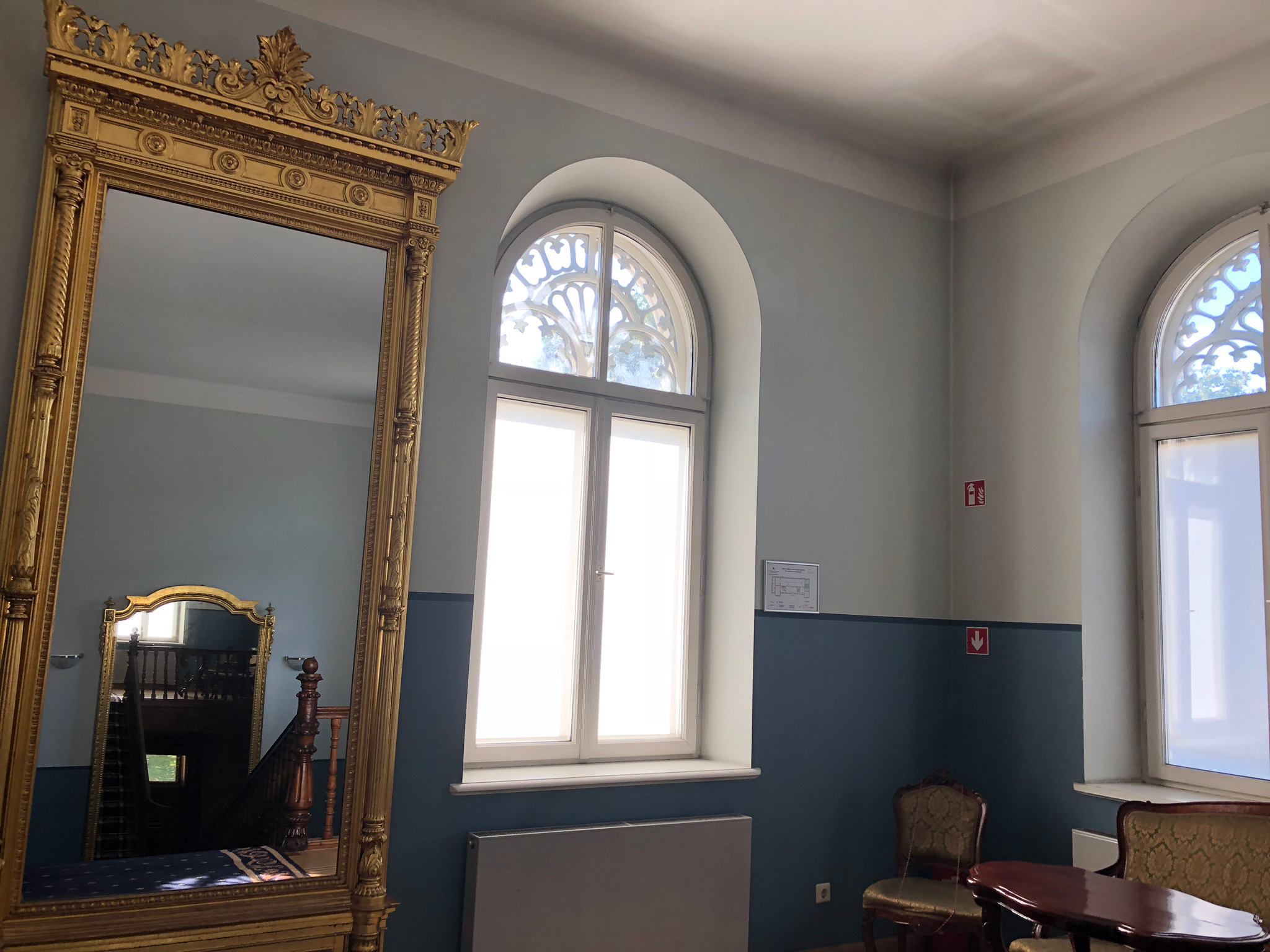
Mirrors room near the primary meeting room with the inter-war Presidents of Lithuania

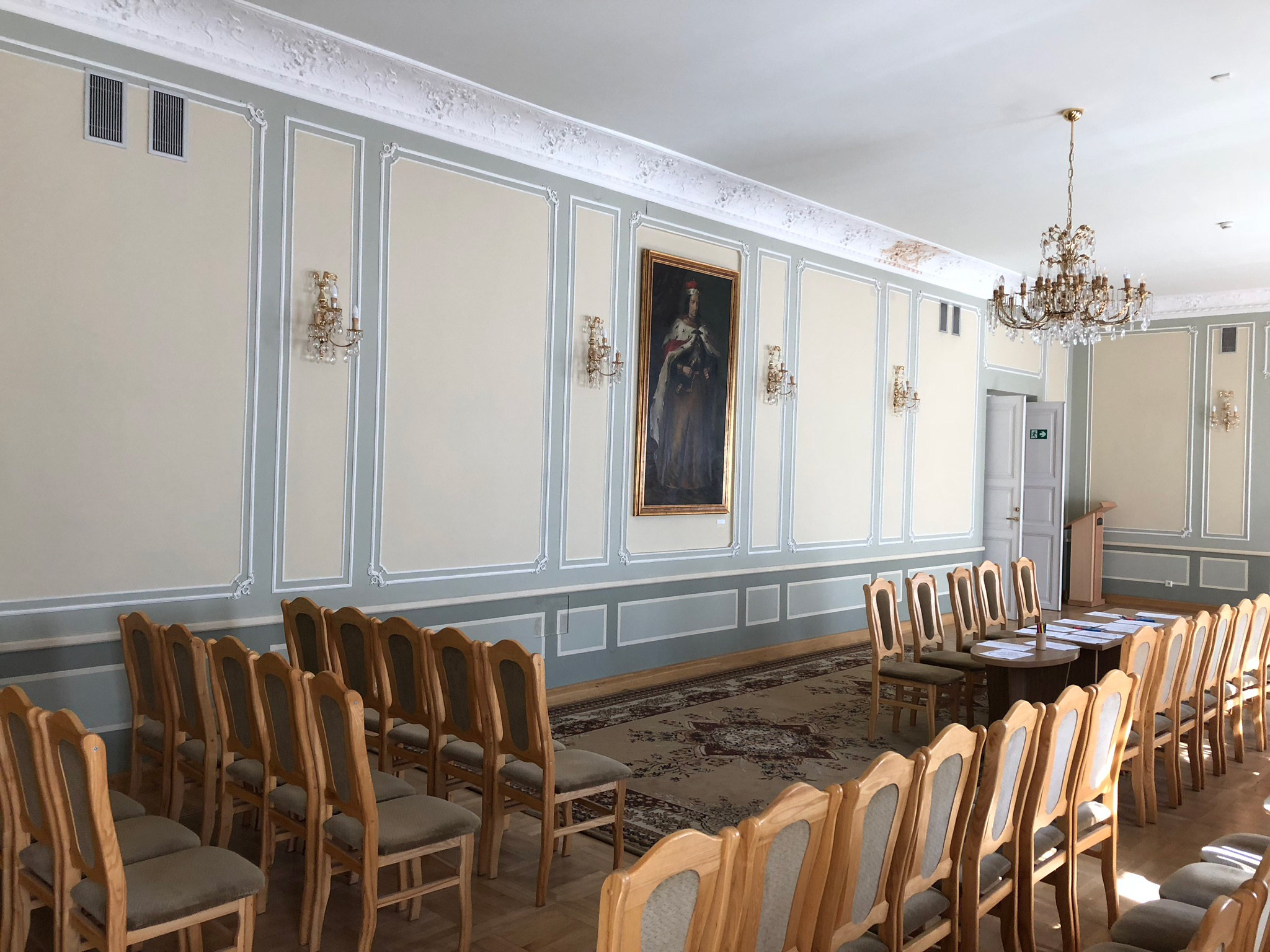
Primary meeting room with the inter-war Presidents of Lithuania

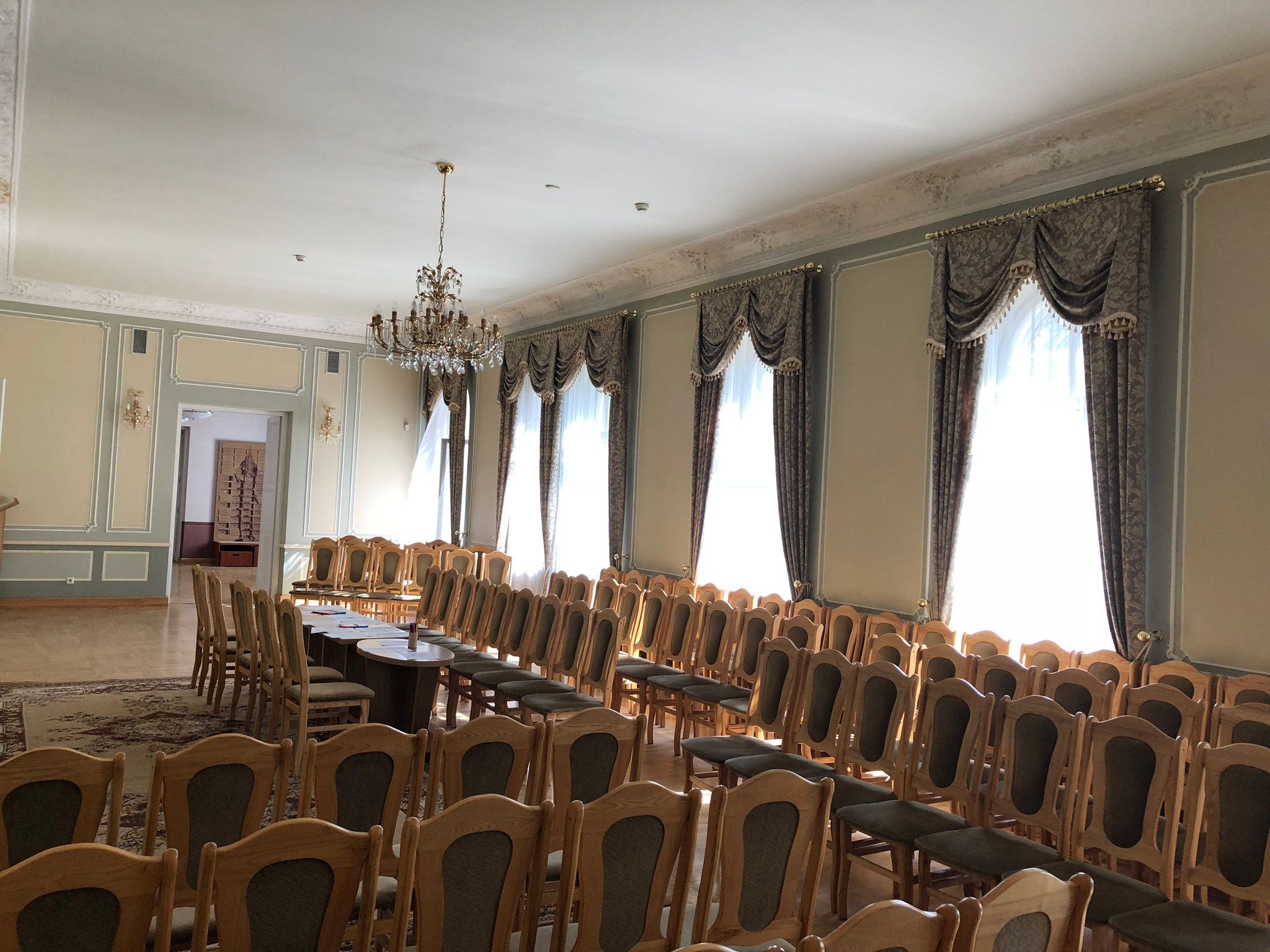
Primary meeting room with the inter-war Presidents of Lithuania

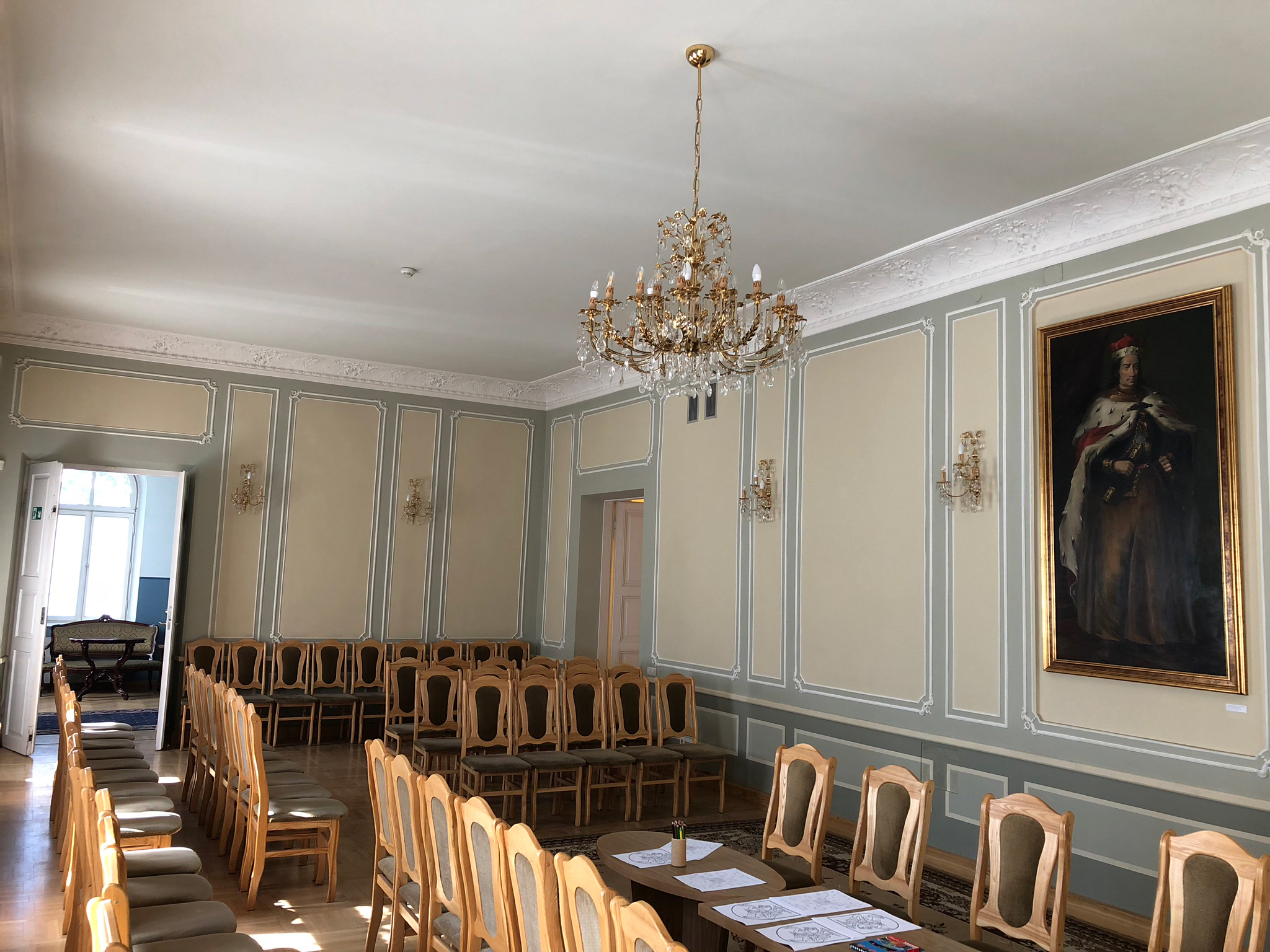
Primary meeting room with the inter-war Presidents of Lithuania

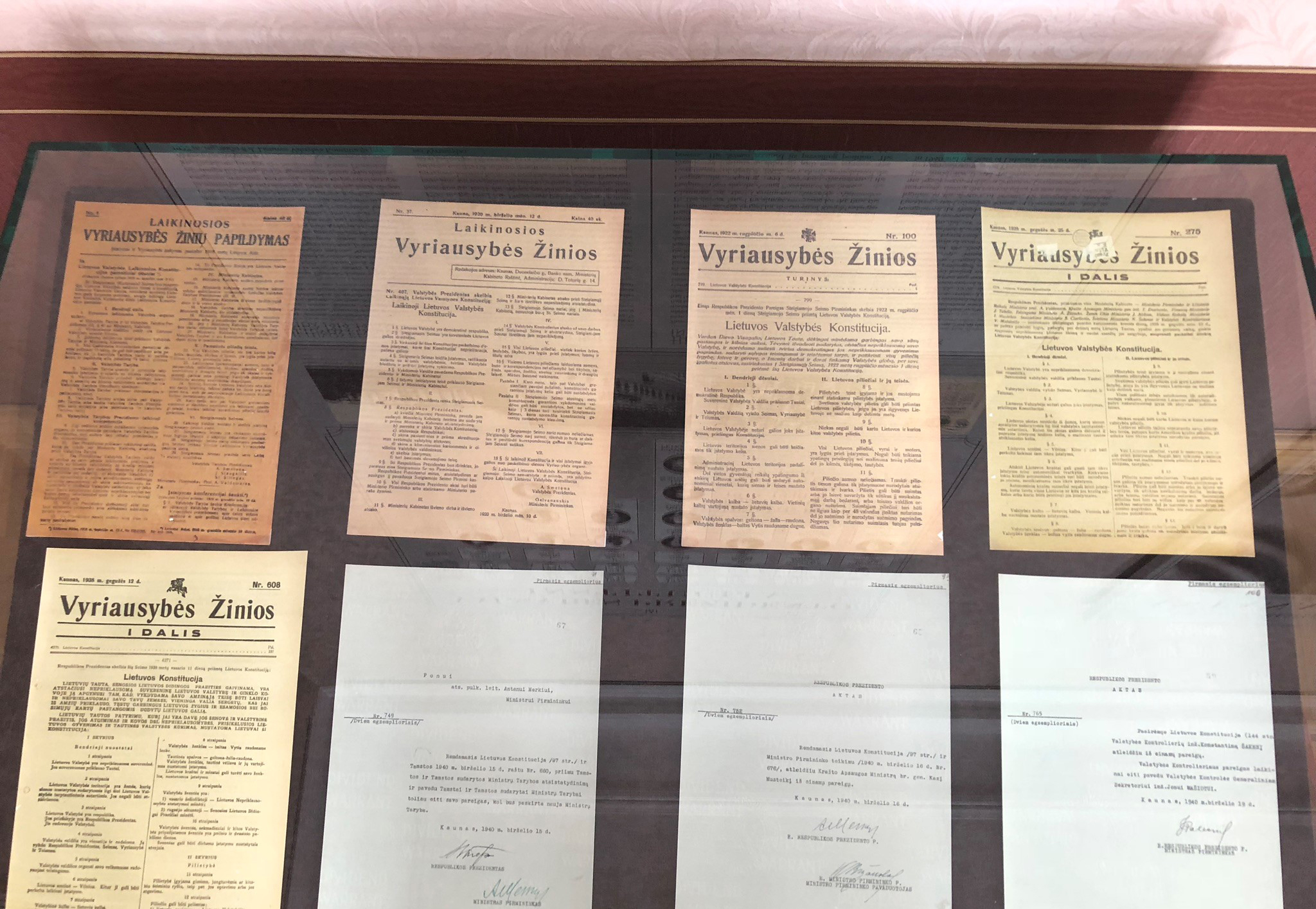
Government of Lithuania news

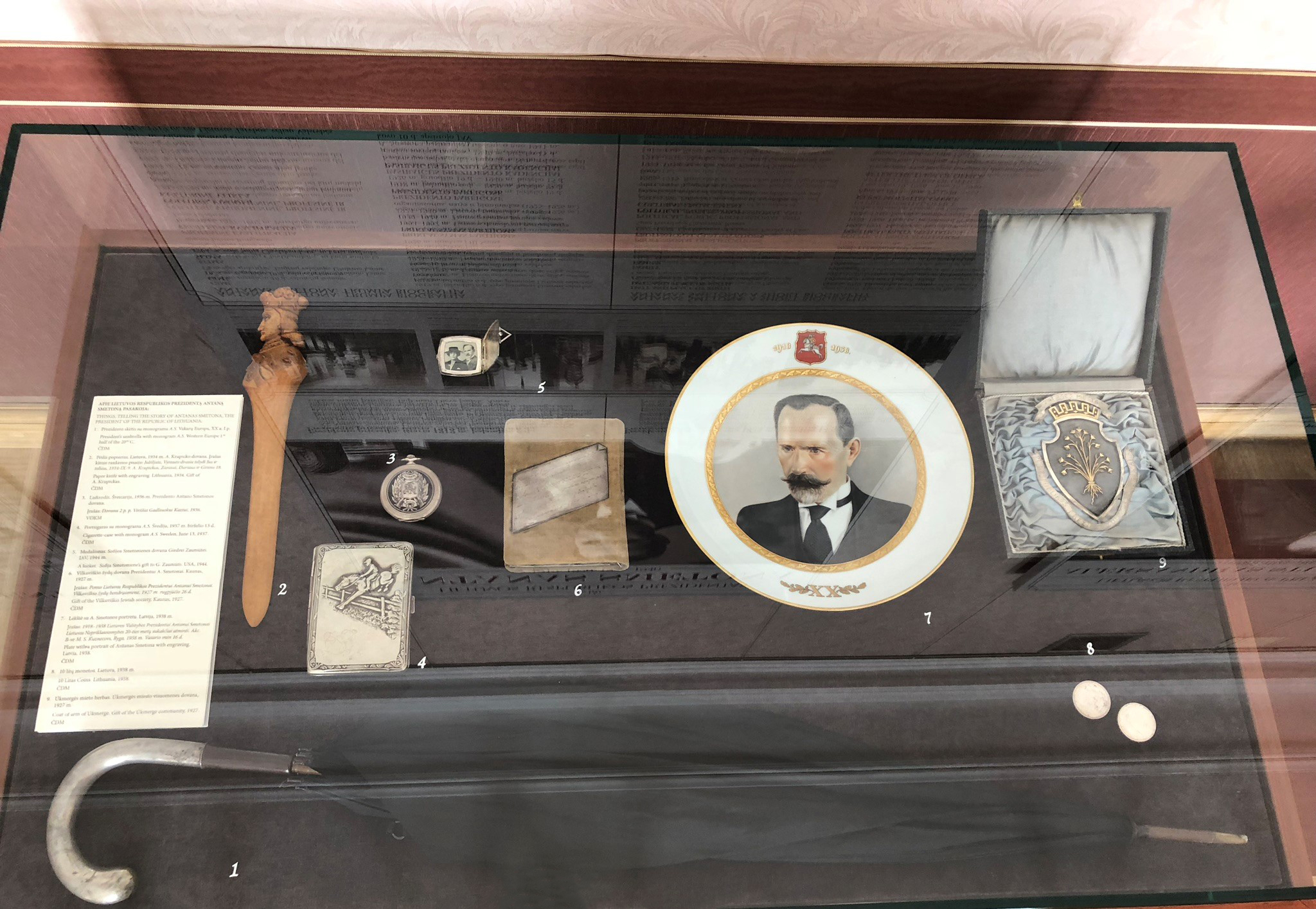
Presidential umbrella with monogram A. S., plate with Antanas Smetona picture, Swiss watch

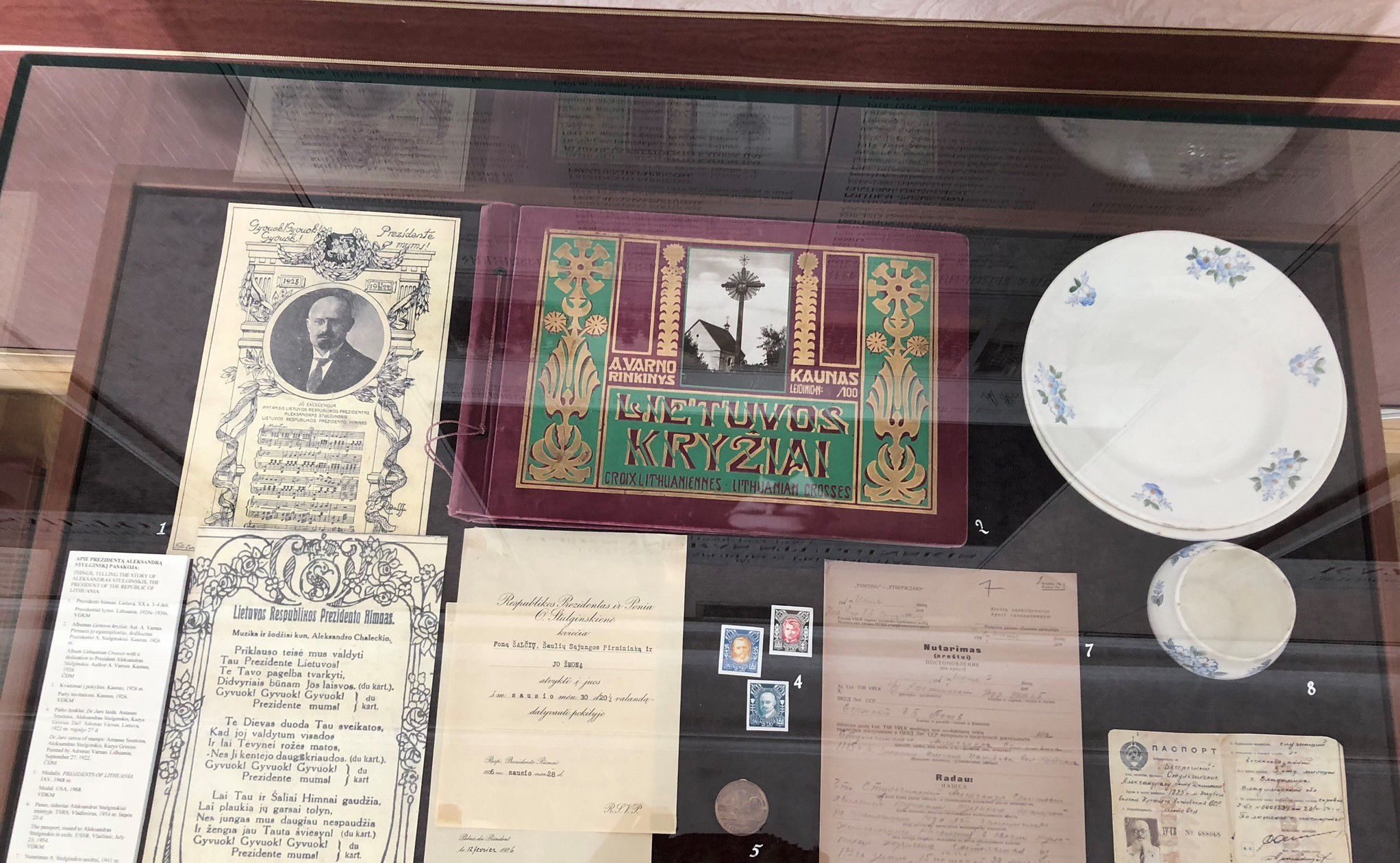
Hymn of the President of Lithuania Aleksandras Stulginskis (left corners), arrest warrant

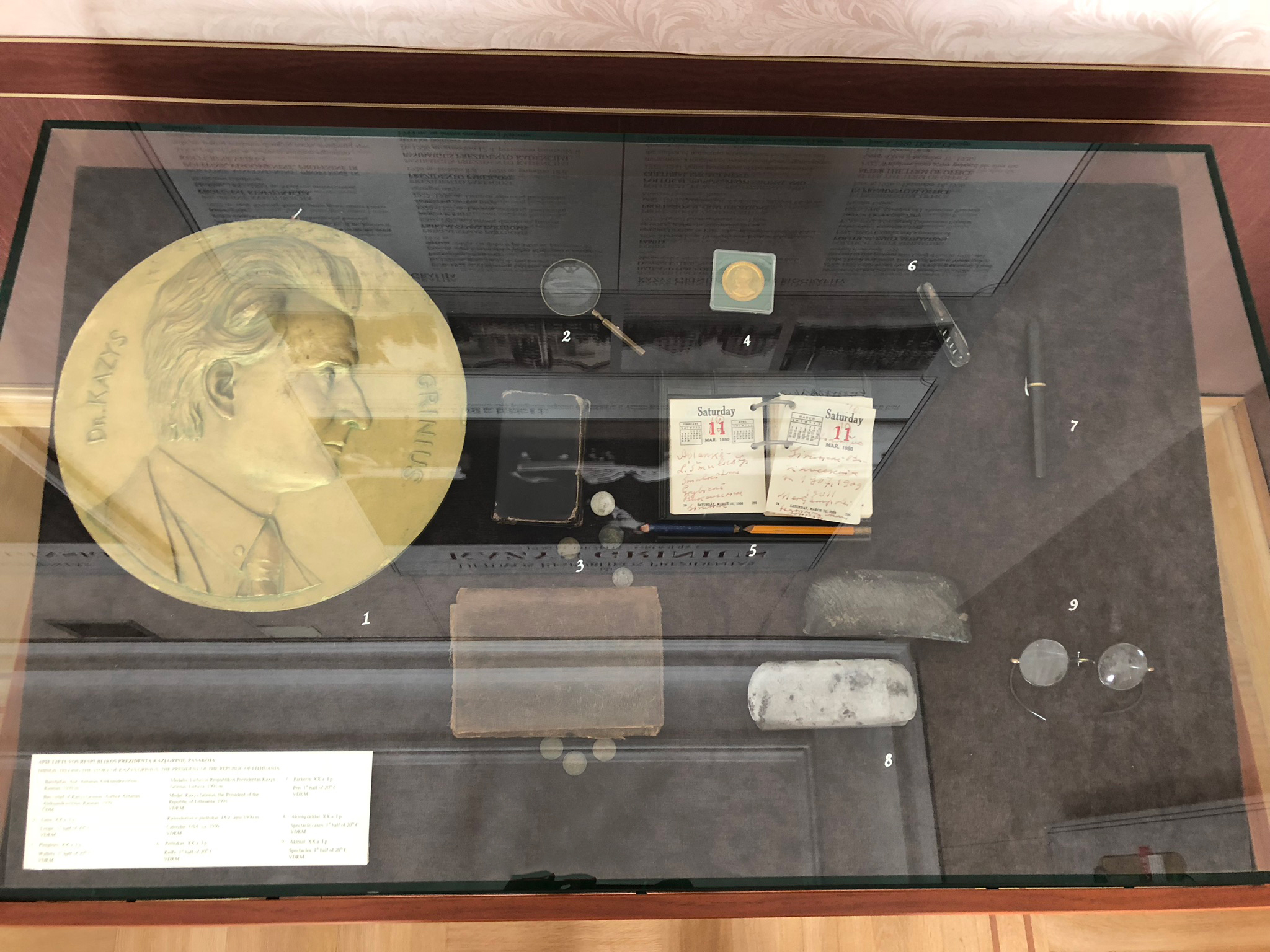
President Kazys Grinius belongings

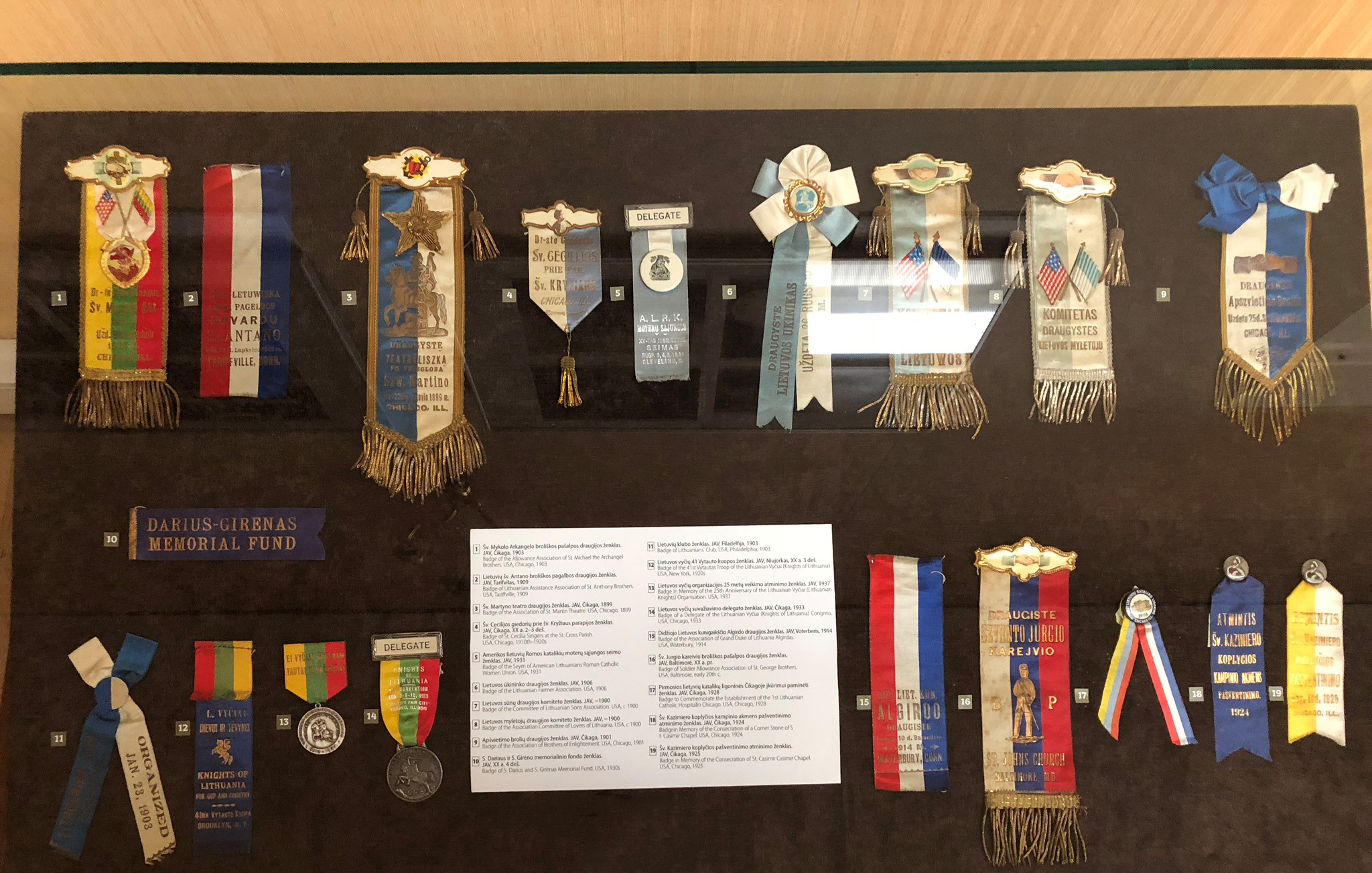
Second floor exhibits

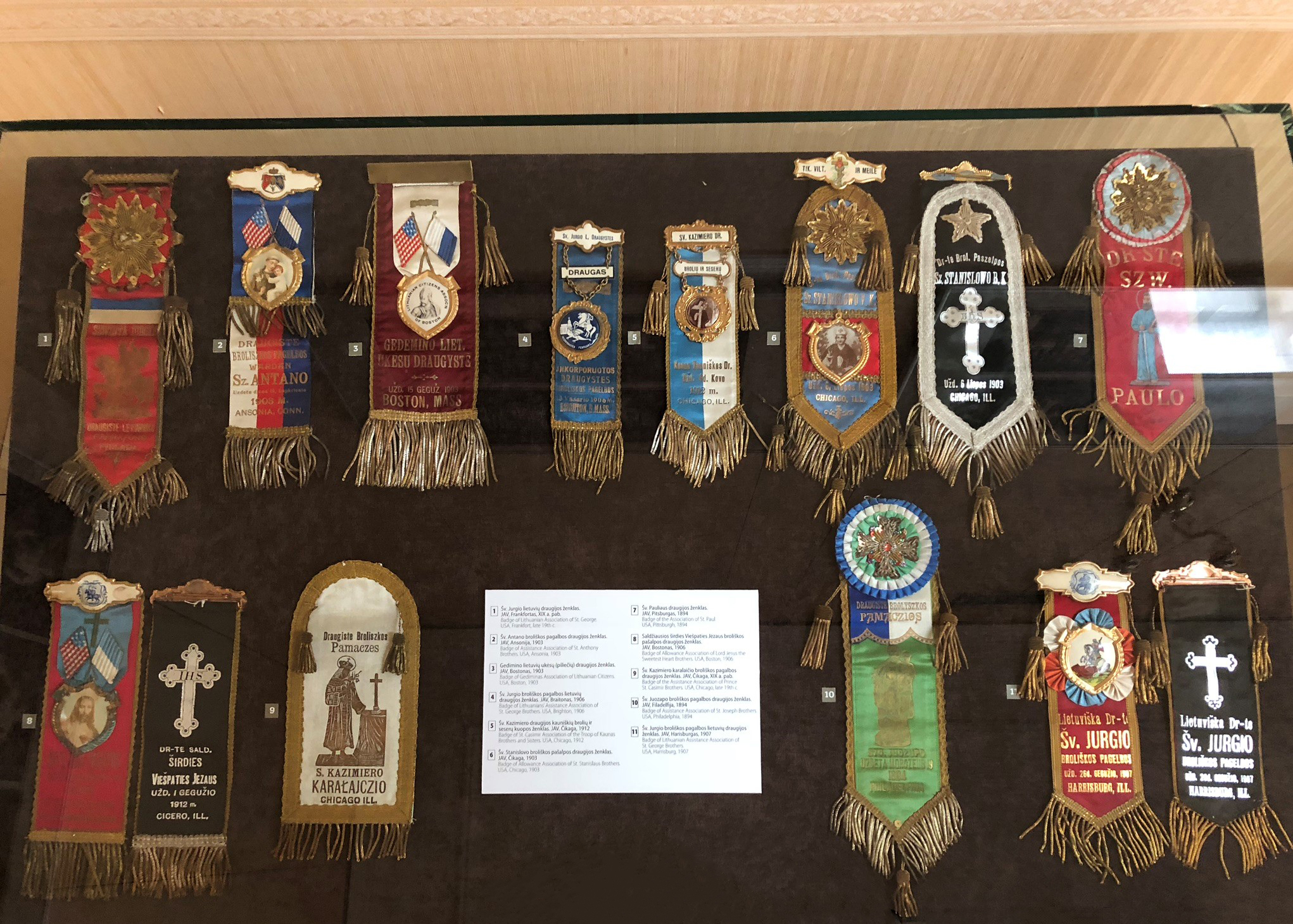
Second floor exhibits

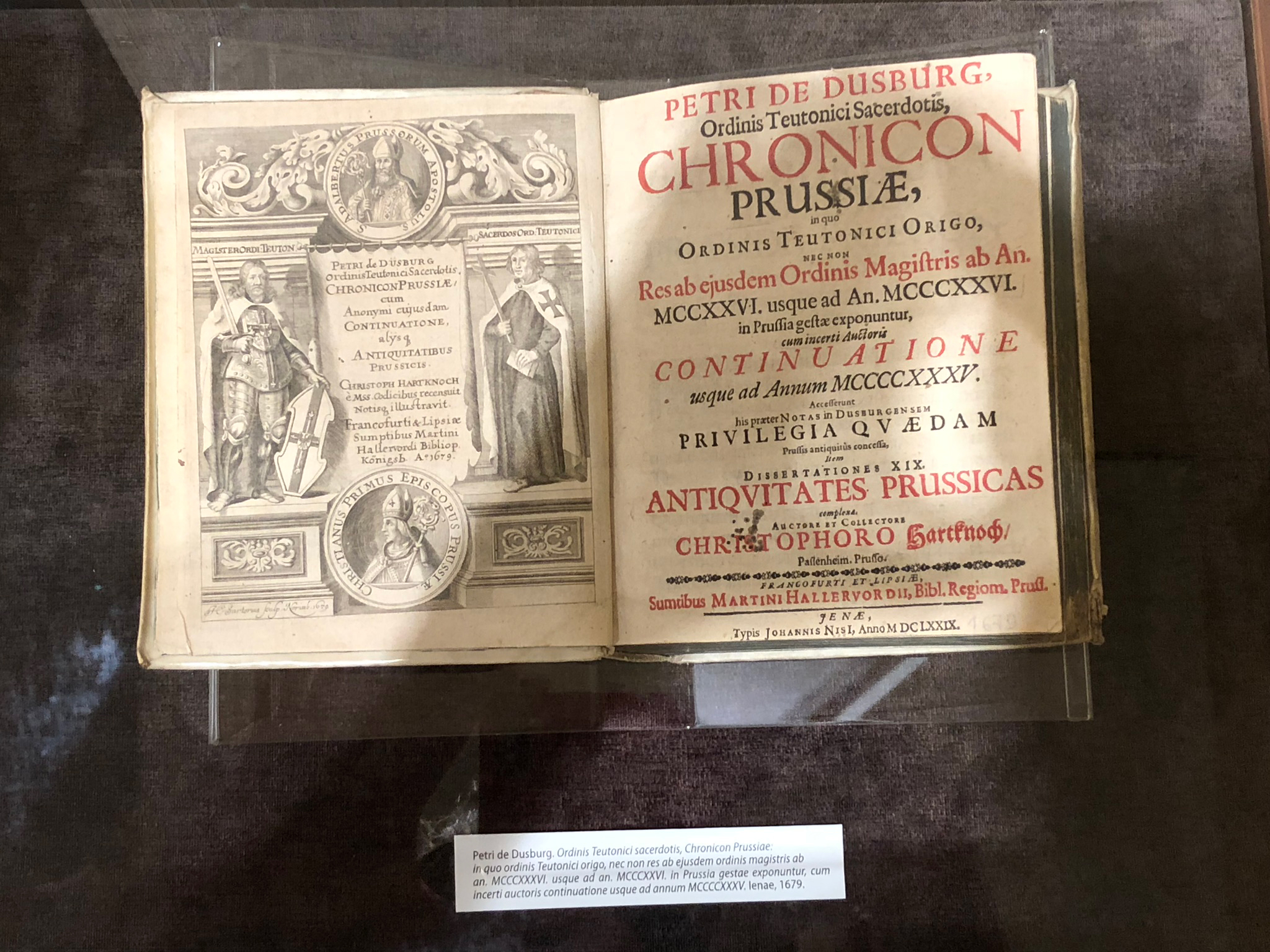
Chronicon terrae Prussiae

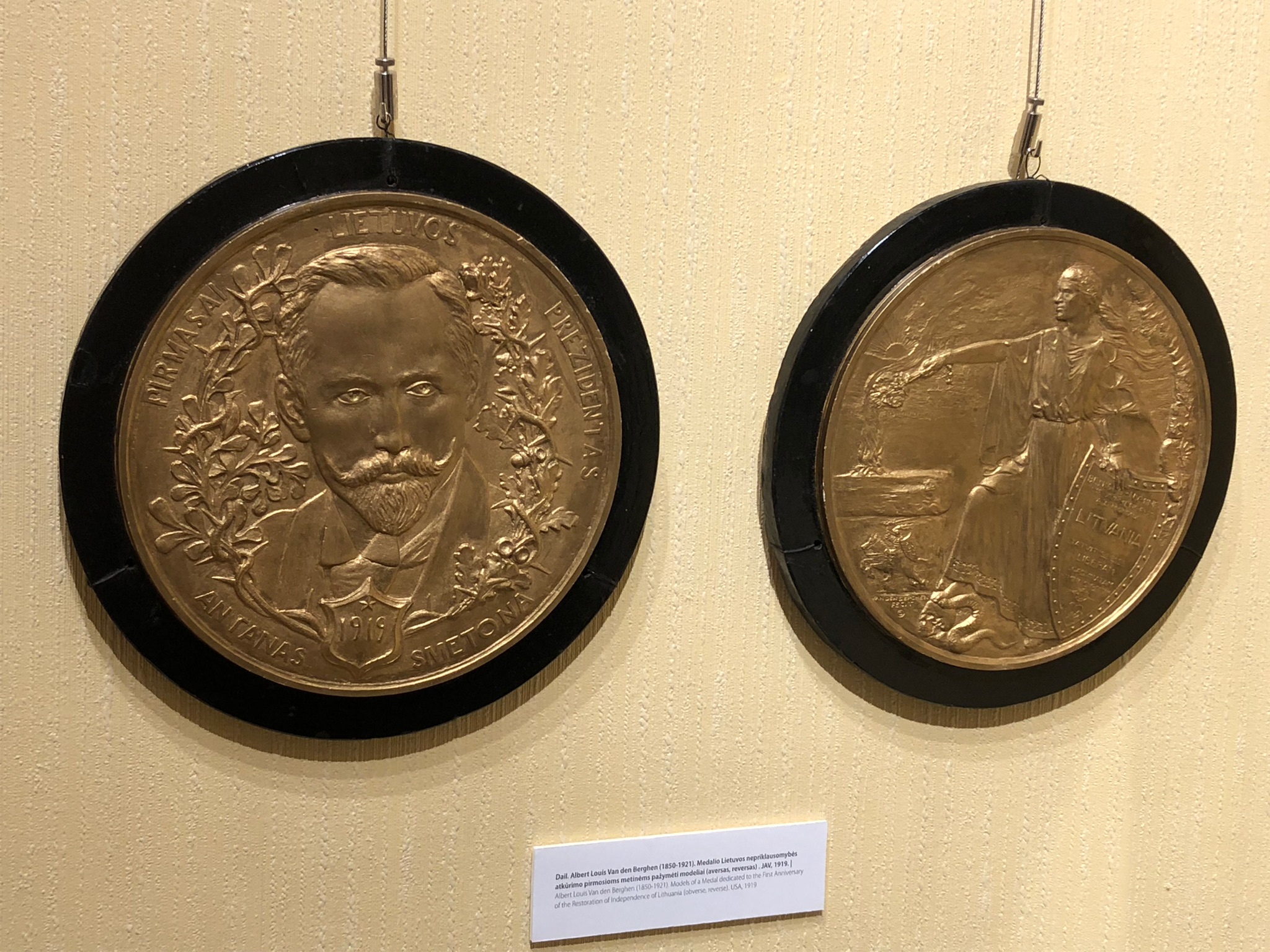
Models of medals commemorating the first year of the Lithuania's independence

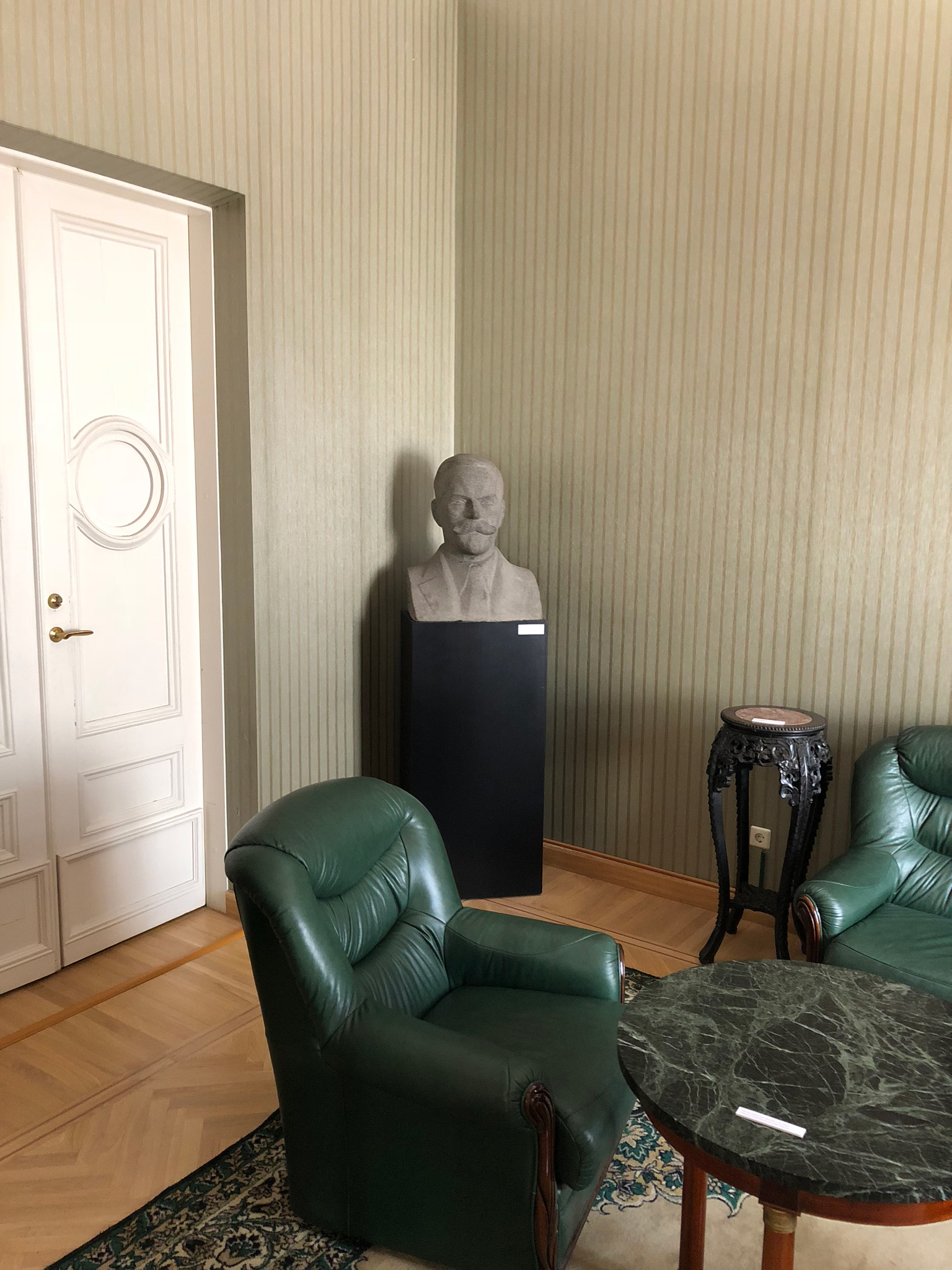
Presidential work room

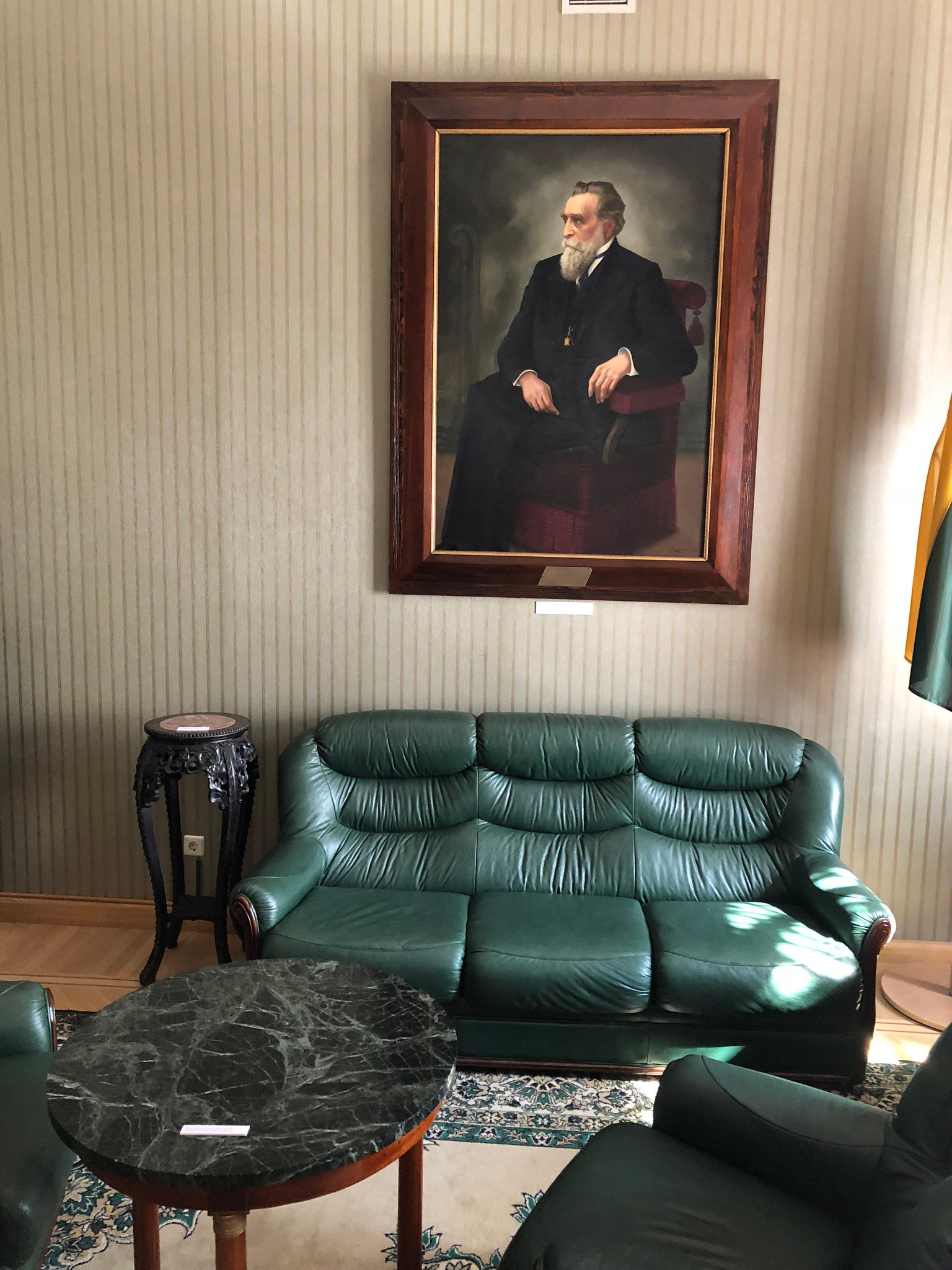
Presidential work room

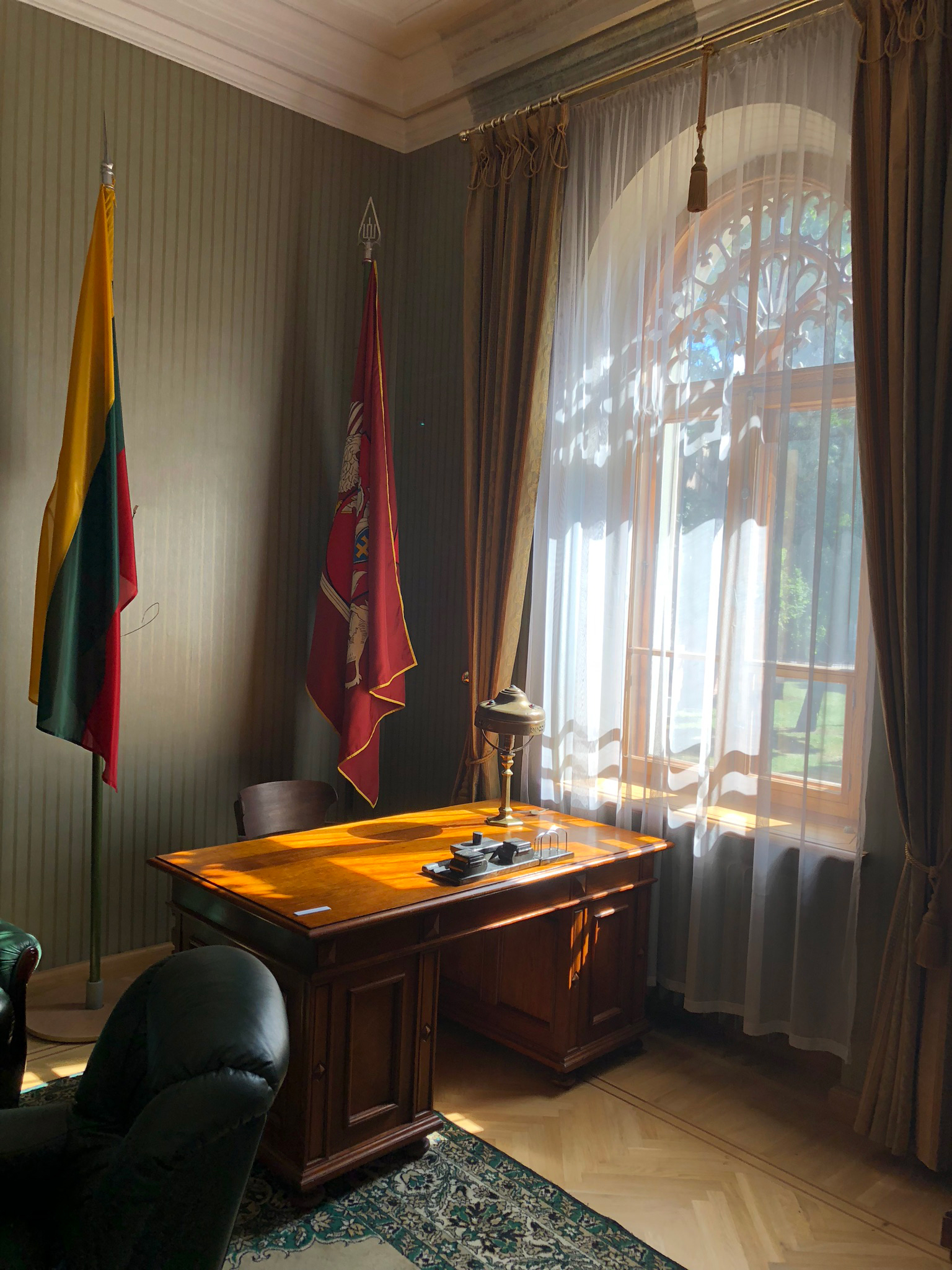
Presidential work room
