= Julius Sabatauskas =

Lithuanian politician

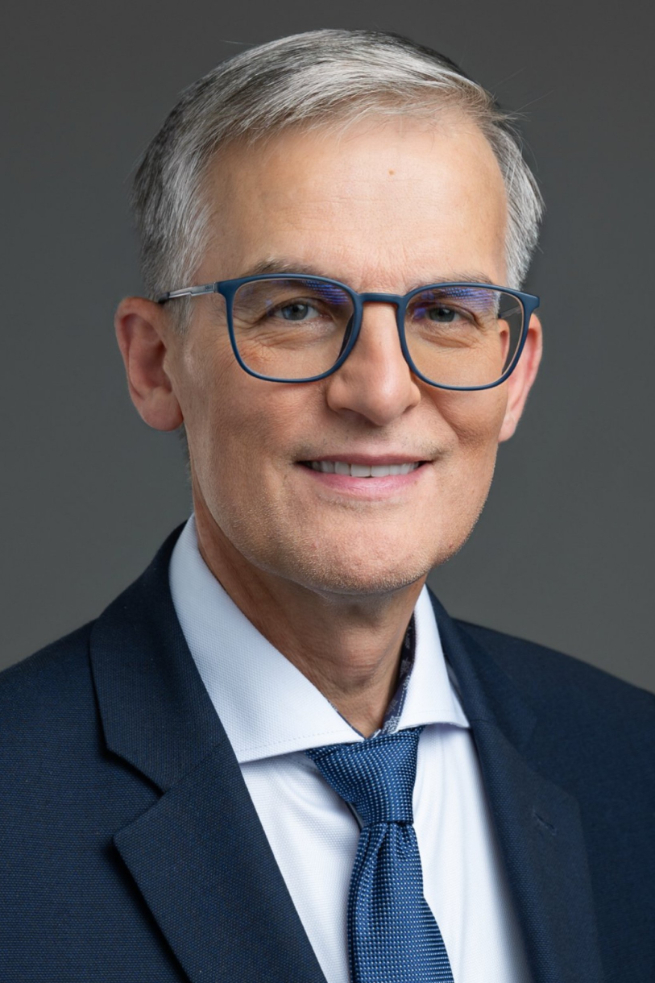

Judge of the Constitutional Court
- Designated; 30 September 2025 – 15 January 2026

Deputy Speaker of the Seimas
- In office 10 March 2020 – 14 November 2024

Member of Seimas
- Incumbent
- Assumed office 14 November 2016
- Constituency: Multi-member
- In office 16 November 2012 – 14 November 2016
- Preceded by: Zita Užlytė
- Succeeded by: Robertas Šarknickas
- Constituency: Alytus
- In office 17 November 2008 – 16 November 2012
- Constituency: Multi-member
- In office 17 November 2008 – 15 November 2004
- Preceded by: Artūras Skardžius
- Succeeded by: Zita Užlytė
- Constituency: Alytus
- In office 19 October 2000 – 14 November 2004
- Constituency: Multi-member

Personal details
- Born: 1 April 1958 (age 68) Syktyvkar, Komi Republic, Russian SFSR
- Party: Social Democratic Party of Lithuania
- Spouse: Stanislava Sabatauskienė
- Education: Kaunas University of Technology; Mykolas Romeris University

Julius Sabatauskas (born 1 April 1958 in Syktyvkar) is an engineer, a lawyer, Deputy Speaker of the Seimas and Member of the Seimas since 2000. Sabatauskas was nominated as a judge of the Constitutional Court of Lithuania on 30 September 2025 by the Speaker of the Seimas, Juozas Olekas. After the analysis of the court, Sabatauskas will not assume the role of judge.

== Biography ==
Born in Syktyvkar, Komi Republic, Russian SFSR, in a family of deportees. In 1976 graduated from high school in Jonava. 1981 graduated from Kaunas University of Technology, Faculty of Automation, engineer of automated control systems. 2002 graduated from Mykolas Romeris University with a master's degree in Law and Management.

== Political life ==
Member of the Social Democratic Party of Lithuania since 1989, member of the council since 1997.

From 1990 to 1995 was a deputy of Alytus City Council, deputy chairman of the council. Since 1995 until 2003 Alytus City Councillor. 2000 was the controller of Alytus City Municipality.

Since 2000 Member of the Seimas.

== Sources ==
- https://www.lrs.lt/sip/portal.show?p_r=38249&p_k=1&p_a=498&p_asm_id=23521
