= Matas Skamarakas =

Lithuanian politician (born 1988)

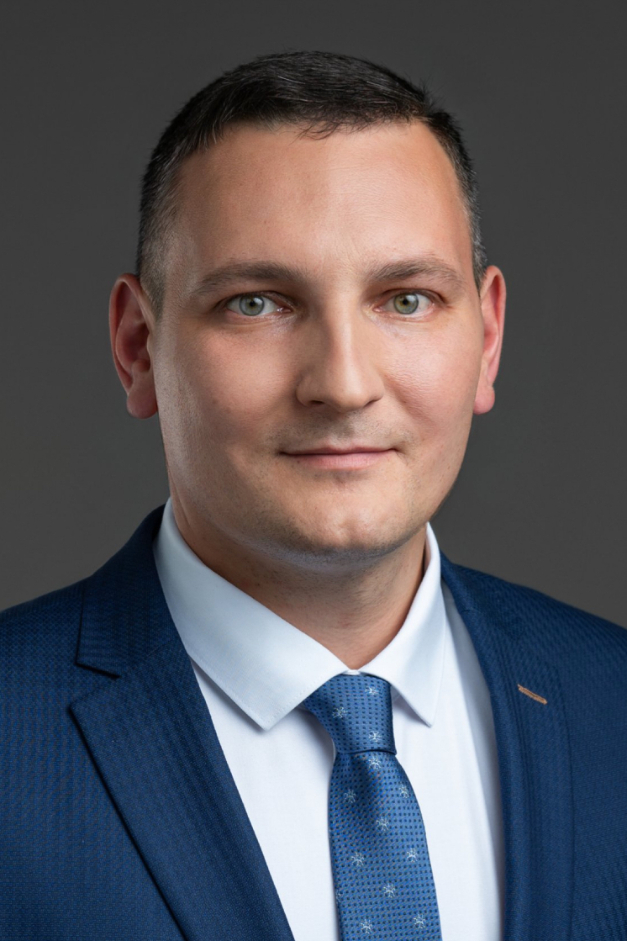

Member of the Seimas
- Incumbent
- Assumed office 26 September 2023
- Preceded by: Arvydas Nekrošius

Personal details
- Born: 21 September 1988 (age 37)
- Party: Social Democratic Party

Matas Skamarakas (born 21 September 1988) is a Lithuanian politician of the Social Democratic Party serving a member of the Seimas since 2023. He previously served as deputy mayor of Raseiniai.
