= List of speakers of the Seimas =

Chairman of the Seimas
- Seimo pirmininkas
- Coat of arms used by Seimas

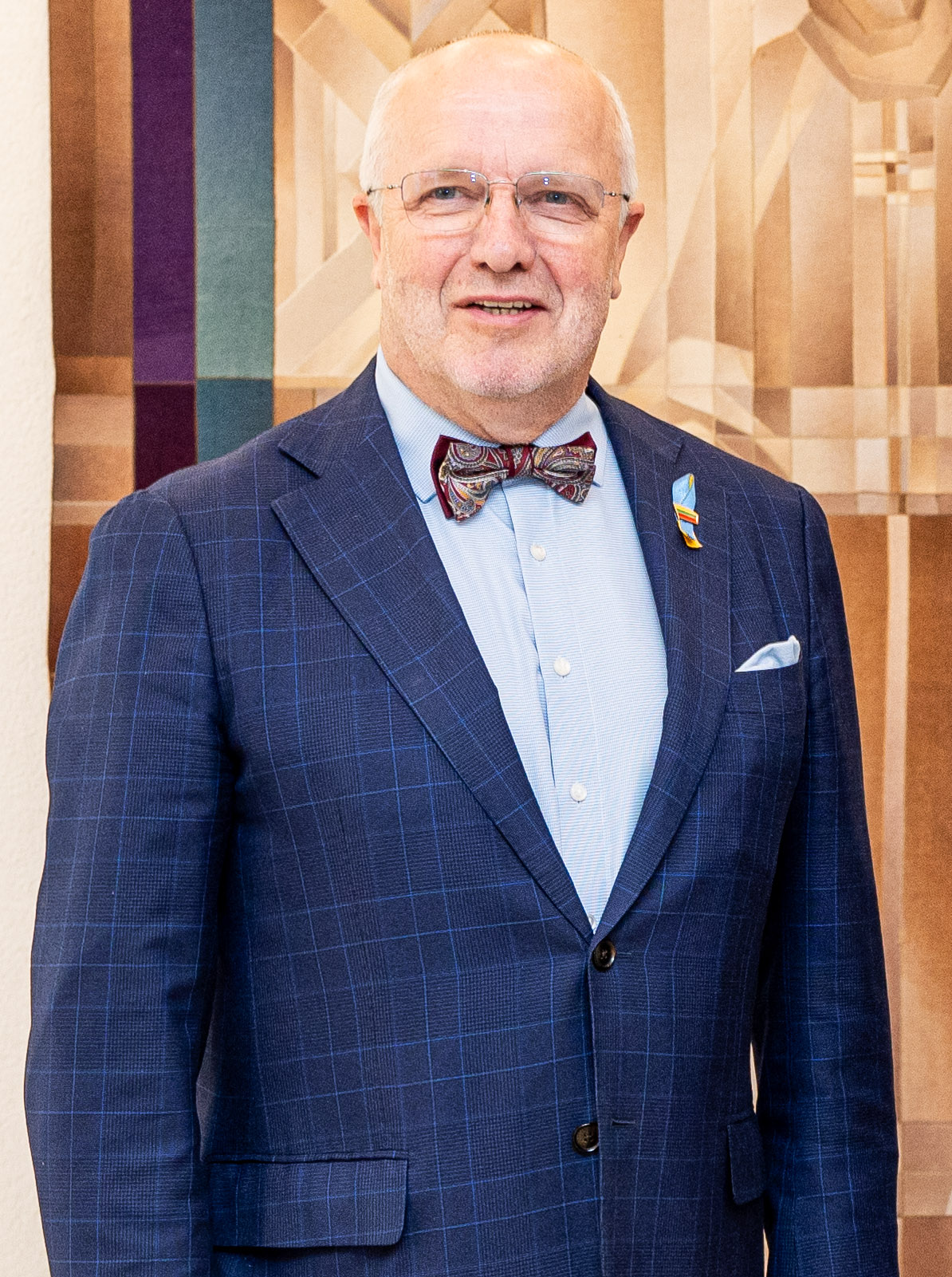
- Incumbent; Juozas Olekas since 10 September 2025
- Seat: Seimas Palace
- Appointer: Seimas
- Term length: Four years
- Inaugural holder: Leonas Bistras
- Formation: 13 November 1922
- Deputy: First Deputy Speaker
- Salary: €52,792 annually

The Speaker of the Seimas (Lithuanian: Seimo pirmininkas, literally translated as Chairman of the Seimas) is the presiding officer of the Seimas, the parliament of Lithuania. The speaker and deputy speakers are elected by the members of the Seimas during the session.

== Speakers ==
=== 1920–1940 ===
Seimas	Name	From	To
Constituent Assembly	Aleksandras Stulginskis	May 15, 1920	November 13, 1922
First Seimas	Justinas Staugaitis (acting)	November 13, 1922	November 21, 1922
First Seimas	Leonas Bistras	November 21, 1922	June 5, 1923
Second Seimas	Antanas Tumėnas	June 5, 1923	June 30, 1923
Second Seimas	Jonas Staugaitis (acting)	June 30, 1923	July 10, 1923
Second Seimas	Justinas Staugaitis	July 10, 1923	January 27, 1925
Second Seimas	Leonas Bistras	January 27, 1925	September 25, 1925
Second Seimas	Vytautas Petrulis	September 25, 1925	February 9, 1926
Second Seimas	Jonas Staugaitis	February 9, 1926	March 5, 1926
Second Seimas	Justinas Staugaitis	March 5, 1926	June 2, 1926
Third Seimas	Jonas Staugaitis	June 2, 1926	December 19, 1926
Third Seimas	Aleksandras Stulginskis	December 19, 1926	April 12, 1927
Fourth Seimas	Konstantinas Šakenis	September 1, 1936	July 1, 1940
People's Seimas	Liudas Adomauskas	July 21, 1940	August 1940

=== 1990–present ===
Seimas	Name	From	To
Reconstituent Seimas	Vytautas Landsbergis	March 11, 1990	November 25, 1992
Sixth Seimas	Algirdas Brazauskas	November 25, 1992	February 25, 1993
Sixth Seimas	Česlovas Juršėnas (acting)	November 25, 1992	February 25, 1993
Sixth Seimas	Česlovas Juršėnas	February 25, 1993	November 25, 1996
Seventh Seimas	Vytautas Landsbergis	November 25, 1996	October 18, 2000
Eighth Seimas	Artūras Paulauskas	October 19, 2000	April 6, 2004
Eighth Seimas	Česlovas Juršėnas (acting)	April 6, 2004	July 12, 2004
Eighth Seimas	Artūras Paulauskas	July 12, 2004	November 14, 2004
Ninth Seimas	Artūras Paulauskas	November 15, 2004	April 11, 2006
Ninth Seimas	Vydas Gedvilas (acting)	April 11, 2006	April 13, 2006
Ninth Seimas	Viktoras Muntianas	April 13, 2006	April 1, 2008
Ninth Seimas	Česlovas Juršėnas	April 1, 2008	November 17, 2008
Tenth Seimas	Arūnas Valinskas	November 17, 2008	September 15, 2009
Tenth Seimas	Irena Degutienė (acting)	September 15, 2009	September 17, 2009
Tenth Seimas	Irena Degutienė	September 17, 2009	September 14, 2012
Eleventh Seimas	Vydas Gedvilas	September 14, 2012	October 3, 2013
Eleventh Seimas	Loreta Graužinienė	October 3, 2013	November 14, 2016
Twelfth Seimas	Viktoras Pranckietis	November 14, 2016	November 13, 2020
Thirteenth Seimas	Viktorija Čmilytė-Nielsen	November 13, 2020	November 14, 2024
Fourteenth Seimas	Saulius Skvernelis	November 14, 2024	September 10, 2025
Fourteenth Seimas	Juozas Olekas	September 10, 2025	present

== First deputy speakers ==
Seimas	Name	From	To	Party
1996–2000	Andrius Kubilius	November 26, 1996	November 9, 1999	Homeland Union
1996–2000	Arvydas Vidžiūnas	November 9, 1999	October 18, 2000	Homeland Union
2000–2004	Česlovas Juršėnas	July 12, 2004	November 14, 2004	Social Democratic Party of Lithuania
2004–2008	Česlovas Juršėnas	October 10, 2006	March 31, 2008	Social Democratic Party of Lithuania
2004–2008	Algis Čaplikas	May 6, 2008	November 17, 2008	Liberal and Centre Union
2008–2012	Irena Degutienė	November 20, 2008	September 16, 2009	Homeland Union - Lithuanian Christian Democrats
2008–2012	Raimondas Šukys	September 24, 2009	March 10, 2010	Liberal and Centre Union
2012–2016	Vytautas Gapšys	November 16, 2012	October 3, 2013	Labour Party
2012–2016	Vydas Gedvilas	October 3, 2013	November 14, 2016	Labour Party
2016–2020	Rima Baškienė	November 14, 2016	November 12, 2020	Lithuanian Farmers and Greens Union
2020–2024	Jurgis Razma	November 13, 2020	November 14, 2024	Homeland Union - Lithuanian Christian Democrats
2024–2028	Juozas Olekas	November 14, 2024	September 10, 2025	Social Democratic Party of Lithuania
2024–2028	Raimondas Šukys	September 10, 2025	July 14, 2026	Dawn of Nemunas
2024–2028	Domas Griškevičius	July 14, 2026	present	Union of Democrats "For Lithuania"

== Deputy speakers ==
Seimas	Name	From	To	Party
Reconstituent	Bronislovas Juozas Kuzmickas	March 10, 1990	November 22, 1992	Sąjūdis
Reconstituent	Kazimieras Motieka	March 11, 1990	November 22, 1992	Sąjūdis
Reconstituent	Česlovas Vytautas Stankevičius	March 10, 1990	November 22, 1992	Sąjūdis
1992–1996	Juozas Bernatonis			Democratic Labour Party of Lithuania
1992–1996	Egidijus Bičkauskas			Centre Union of Lithuania (from 1993)
1992–1996	Aloyzas Sakalas			Social Democratic Party of Lithuania
1996–2000	Romualdas Ozolas	November 26, 1996	November 4, 1999	Lithuanian Centre Union
1996–2000	Arvydas Vidžiūnas	November 26, 1996	November 9, 1999	Homeland Union
1996–2000	Feliksas Palubinskas	November 26, 1996	October 18, 2000	Lithuanian Christian Democratic Party
1996–2000	Rimantas Jonas Dagys	November 9, 1999	October 18, 2000	Lithuanian Social Democratic Union
1996–2000	Rasa Juknevičienė	November 9, 1999	October 18, 2000	Homeland Union
2000–2004	Vytenis Andriukaitis	July 12, 2001	July 27, 2004	Social Democratic Party of Lithuania
2000–2004	Ramūnas Karbauskis	October 24, 2000	May 14, 2001	Lithuanian Peasants Popular Union
2000–2004	Gintaras Steponavičius	October 24, 2000	November 14, 2004	Labour Party
2000–2004	Artūras Skardžius	October 26, 2000	November 14, 2004	New Union (Social Liberals)
2004–2008	Česlovas Juršėnas	November 15, 2004	October 9, 2006	Social Democratic Party of Lithuania
2004–2008	Alfredas Pekeliūnas	November 15, 2004	November 17, 2008	Peasants and New Democratic Party Union (to May 7, 2007); Peasants and People's and Civil Democracy (May 8, 2007 – January 17, 2008); Lithuanian Peasants Popular Union (from January 18, 2008)
2004–2008	Viktoras Muntianas	December 9, 2004	April 12, 2006	Labour Party
2004–2008	Vydas Gedvilas	April 26, 2005	November 17, 2008	Labour Party
2004–2008	Gintaras Steponavičius	January 20, 2005	November 17, 2008	Liberal and Centre Union
2004–2008	Algis Čaplikas	October 10, 2006	May 5, 2008	Liberal and Centre Union
2004–2008	Andrius Kubilius	October 10, 2006	November 17, 2008	Homeland Union
2008–2012	Irena Degutienė	November 18, 2008	November 19, 2008	Homeland Union - Lithuanian Christian Democrats
2008–2012	Virginija Baltraitienė	November 18, 2008	November 16, 2012	Labour Party
2008–2012	Algis Kašėta	November 18, 2008	June 22, 2011	Liberals' Movement
2008–2012	Česlovas Stankevičius	November 18, 2008	November 16, 2012	Homeland Union - Lithuanian Christian Democrats
2008–2012	Raimondas Šukys	November 18, 2008	September 23, 2009	Liberal and Centre Union
2008–2012	Česlovas Juršėnas	September 24, 2009	November 16, 2012	Social Democratic Party of Lithuania
2008–2012	Algis Čaplikas	April 21, 2011	November 16, 2012	Liberal and Centre Union
2008–2012	Erikas Tamašauskas	November 10, 2011	November 16, 2011	Liberals' Movement
2012–2016	Algirdas Sysas	November 16, 2012	November 14, 2016	Social Democratic Party of Lithuania
2012–2016	Gediminas Kirkilas	November 16, 2012	November 14, 2016	Social Democratic Party of Lithuania
2012–2016	Kęstas Komskis	November 16, 2012	November 14, 2016	Order and Justice
2012–2016	Jaroslav Narkevič	November 16, 2012	November 14, 2016	Electoral Action of Poles in Lithuania
2012–2016	Irena Degutienė	November 16, 2012	November 14, 2016	Homeland Union - Lithuanian Christian Democrats
2016–2020	Irena Degutienė	November 14, 2016	November 12, 2020	Homeland Union
2016–2020	Gediminas Kirkilas	November 14, 2016	November 12, 2020	Social Democratic Labour Party of Lithuania
2016–2020	Jonas Liesys	September 28, 2018	November 12, 2020	Liberals' Movement
2016–2020	Arvydas Nekrošius	November 14, 2016	November 12, 2020	Lithuanian Farmers and Greens Union
2016–2020	Irena Šiaulienė	April 7, 2017	November 12, 2020	Social Democratic Labour Party of Lithuania
2016–2020	Remigijus Žemaitaitis	September 28, 2018	November 18, 2019	Order and Justice
2020–2024	Jonas Jarutis	December 3, 2020	November 14, 2024	Lithuanian Farmers and Greens Union
2020–2024	Andrius Mazuronis	November 13, 2020	November 14, 2024	Labour Party
2020–2024	Vytautas Mitalas	November 17, 2020	November 14, 2024	Freedom Party
2020–2024	Radvilė Morkūnaitė-Mikulėnienė	November 17, 2020	June 27, 2024	Homeland Union
2020–2024	Julius Sabatauskas	November 17, 2020	November 14, 2024	Social Democratic Party of Lithuania
2020–2024	Paulius Saudargas	November 17, 2020	July 15, 2024	Homeland Union
2020–2024	Žygimantas Pavilionis	July 16, 2024	November 14, 2024	Homeland Union
2024–2028	Rasa Budbergytė	November 14, 2024	present	Social Democratic Party of Lithuania
2024–2028	Viktorija Čmilytė-Nielsen	November 14, 2024	present	Liberals' Movement
2024–2028	Orinta Leiputė	November 14, 2024	present	Social Democratic Party of Lithuania
2024–2028	Radvilė Morkūnaitė-Mikulėnienė	November 14, 2024	present	Homeland Union
2024–2028	Agnė Širinskienė	November 14, 2024	March 21, 2025	Dawn of Nemunas
2024–2028	Raimondas Šukys	March 27, 2025	September 10, 2025	Dawn of Nemunas
2024–2028	Daiva Žebelienė	April 9, 2025	present	Dawn of Nemunas
2024–2028	Aušrinė Norkienė	September 11, 2025	present	Lithuanian Farmers and Greens Union
2024–2028	Jūratė Zailskienė	July 14, 2026	present	Social Democratic Party of Lithuania
