= Arvydas Nekrošius =

Lithuanian politician

Member of the Seimas
- In office 14 November 2016 – 19 April 2023
- Preceded by: Post created
- Succeeded by: Matas Skamarakas
- Constituency: Raseiniai - Kėdainiai

Deputy Speaker of the Seimas
- In office 15 November 2016 – 12 November 2020

Personal details
- Born: 10 March 1984 (age 42) Raseiniai, Lithuania
- Party: Lithuanian Farmers and Greens Union (2014-present)
- Education: Aleksandras Stulginskis University

Arvydas Nekrošius (born 10 March 1984) is a Lithuanian engineer energetic, technology Ph.D., a politician. He was a Member of the Seimas for Raseiniai - Kėdainiai constituency and Deputy Speaker of the Seimas.

Seimas
Preceded by Edmundas Jonyla (Raseiniai); Virginija Baltraitienė (Kėdainiai)	Member of the Seimas for Raseiniai and Kėdainiai; 2016–2023	Succeeded by Matas Skamarakas
Incumbent
