= Jonas Staugaitis =

Lithuanian politician

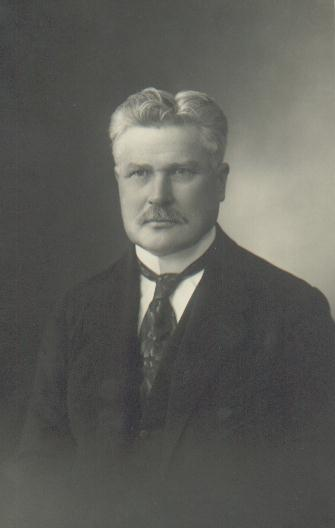

Acting President of Lithuania
- In office 18 December 1926 – 19 December 1926
- Preceded by: Kazys Grinius
- Succeeded by: Aleksandras Stulginskis (acting)

Speaker of the Seimas
- In office 2 June 1926 – 17 December 1926
- President: Aleksandras Stulginskis; Kazys Grinius
- Preceded by: Vytautas Petrulis
- Succeeded by: Aleksandras Stulginskis

Personal details
- Born: 20 May 1868 Omentiškiai, Suwalki Governorate, Russian Empire
- Died: 18 January 1952 (aged 83) Kaunas, Lithuanian SSR, Soviet Union
- Party: Lithuanian Popular Peasants' Union
- Education: University of Warsaw

Jonas Staugaitis (20 May 1868 in Omentiškiai, Suwałki Governorate – 18 January 1952 in Kaunas) was the acting President of Lithuania during the December 1926 coup d'état. He was formally elected for a few hours as the Speaker of the Seimas; as the highest-ranked official, he also became the de jure President of Lithuania. He renounced the office after the coup d'état was complete.

He was a medical doctor, having studied at the University of Warsaw. In 1919, he was elected to the Seimas (Lithuanian parliament) as a member of the Lithuanian Popular Peasants' Union. On 2 June 1926, he was elected the speaker of Seimas.

He is buried in the Petrašiūnai cemetery in Kaunas.

Preceded by Kazys Grinius	President of Lithuania (acting); 18 December 1926 – 19 December 1926	Succeeded by Aleksandras Stulginskis (acting)
