= Aleksandras Stulginskis =

Lithuanian politician

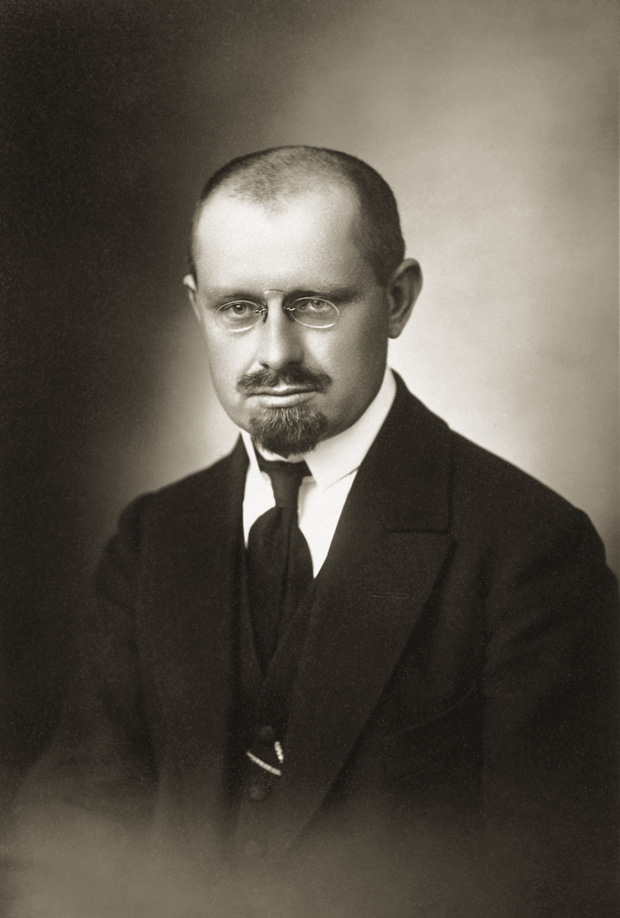

2nd President of Lithuania
- In office 19 June 1920 – 7 June 1926
- Preceded by: Antanas Smetona
- Succeeded by: Kazys Grinius

Acting President of Lithuania
- In office 19 December 1926 – 19 December 1926
- Preceded by: Jonas Staugaitis (acting)
- Succeeded by: Antanas Smetona

Speaker of the Constituent Assembly of Lithuania
- In office 15 May 1920 – 6 October 1922
- Preceded by: Gabrielė Petkevičaitė-Bitė (Acting)
- Succeeded by: Leonas Bistras (as Speaker of the Seimas)

Personal details
- Born: 26 February 1885 Kutaliai, Kovno Governorate, Russian Empire
- Died: 22 September 1969 (aged 84) Kaunas, Lithuanian SSR, Soviet Union
- Party: Lithuanian Christian Democratic Party

Aleksandras Stulginskis [ɐlʲɛkˈsɐ̂ˑndrɐs stʊlʲˈɡʲɪ̂nʲsʲkʲɪs] (26 February 1885 – 22 September 1969) was the second President of Lithuania (1920–1926). Stulginskis was also acting President of Lithuania for a few hours later in 1926, following a military coup that was led by his predecessor, President Antanas Smetona, and which had brought down Stulginskis's successor, Kazys Grinius. The coup returned Smetona to office after Stulginskis's brief formal assumption of the Presidency.

He began his theological studies in Kaunas and continued in Innsbruck, Austria. However, he decided not to become a priest and moved to the Institute of Agricultural Sciences in University of Halle. He graduated in 1913 and returned to Lithuania. There, he started to work as a farmer. He published many articles on agronomy in Lithuanian press. In 1918, he started to publish journals Ūkininkas ("Farmer") and Ūkininko kalendorius ("Farmer's Calendar").

During World War I, he moved to Vilnius. He was one of the founders of the Lithuanian Christian Democratic Party and the head of its Central Committee in 1917. He signed the memorandum for the president Woodrow Wilson, addressing the question of the recognition of the Lithuanian statehood by the United States. Contrary to Smetona's views, Stulginskis was oriented towards the Entente. He was one of the co-organizers of the Vilnius Conference. After, he was elected to the Council of Lithuania.

On 16 February 1918, he signed the Act of Independence of Lithuania. He was an advocate of the democratic republic as the form of the Lithuanian state. Thus, he strongly opposed the idea of monarchy (actually, Mindaugas II was the King of Lithuania from 11 July to 2 November 1918). In independent Lithuania, Stulginskis was in charge of organizing the national army to defend the country against the aggressions of Bolsheviks and Poles.

He served as a minister many times. Between May 1920 and 1922, he was Speaker of the Constituent Assembly of Lithuania and thus acting president of the republic. From 1922 to 1926, he was the second President of Lithuania. Stulginskis was Speaker of the Seimas from 1926 to 1927.

He withdrew from politics in 1927, and worked on his farm. In 1941, Stulginskis and his wife were arrested by the Soviet NKVD and deported to a gulag in the Krasnoyarsk Krai, while his wife was deported to the Komi Republic. After World War II, in 1952, he was officially sentenced by the Soviet authorities to 25 years in prison for his anti-socialist and clerical policies in pre-war Lithuania.

Released after Joseph Stalin's death in 1956, he was allowed to emigrate, yet he refused and returned to the Lithuanian SSR. Stulginskis settled in Kaunas, where he died on 22 September 1969, aged 84, the last of the Signatories of the Act of Independence of Lithuania.

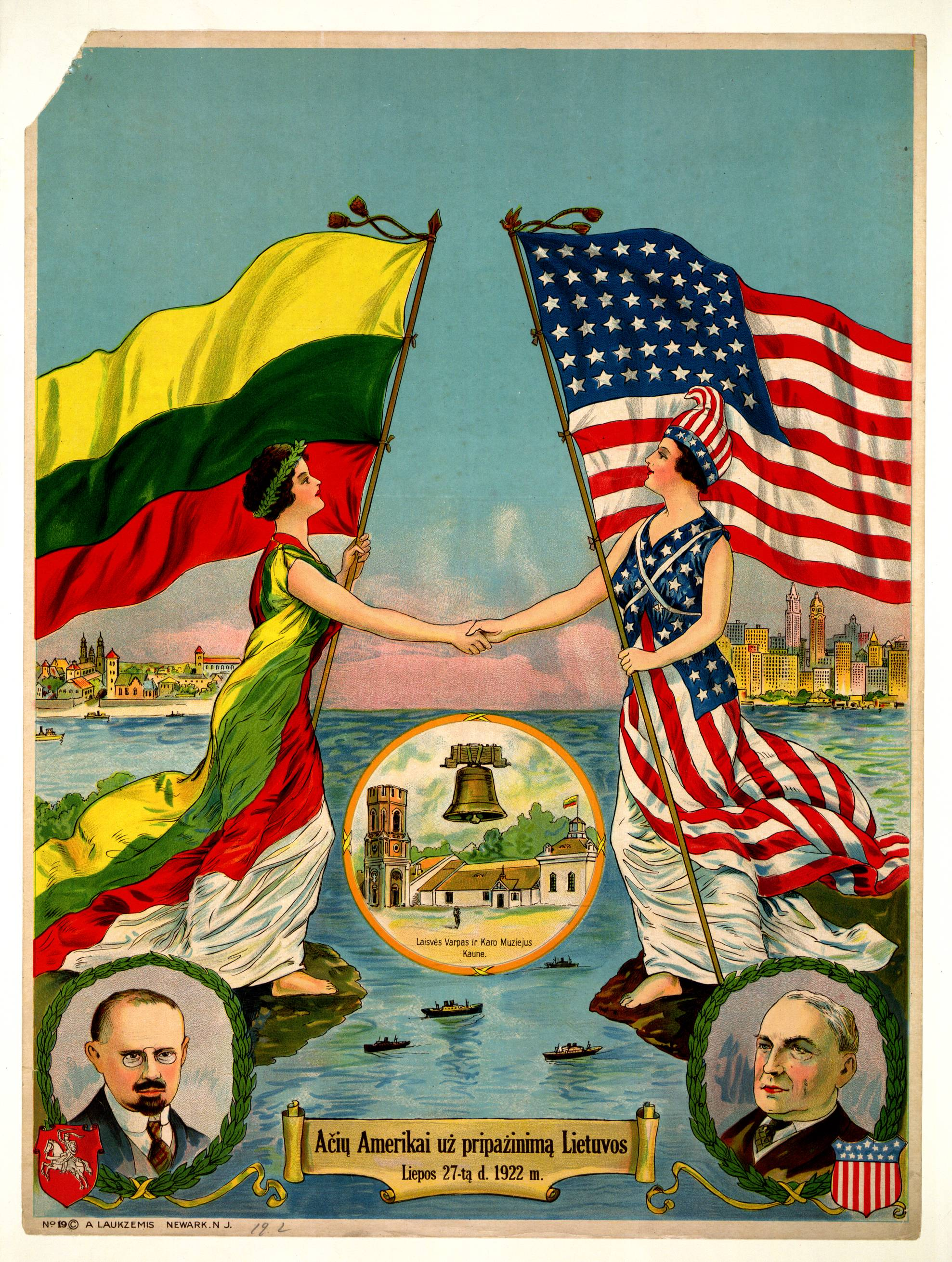
Aleksandras Stulginskis in a Lithuanian poster.

== See also ==
- List of presidents of Lithuania

Preceded by Antanas Smetona	President of Lithuania; 19 June 1920 – 7 June 1926	Succeeded by Kazys Grinius
Preceded by Jonas Staugaitis (acting)	President of Lithuania (acting); 19 December 1926	Succeeded by Antanas Smetona
