= Artūras Skardžius =

Lithuanian politician (born 1960)

Member of the Seimas
- Incumbent
- Assumed office 10 March 2021
- Preceded by: Antanas Guoga
- Constituency: Multi-member
- In office 16 November 2012 – 13 November 2020
- Constituency: Šilutė–Pagėgiai (2012–2016); Multi-member (2016–2020)
- In office 19 October 2000 – 18 November 2008
- Constituency: Alytus (2000–2004); Multi-member (2004–2008)

Personal details
- Born: 17 November 1960 (age 65)
- Party: NA (since 2024)
- Other political affiliations: NS (1998–2006); LSDP (2011–2016); LRP (2019–2020); DP (2020–2022)

Artūras Skardžius (born 17 November 1960) is a Lithuanian politician. He has been a member of the Seimas since 2021, having previously served from 2000 to 2008 and from 2012 to 2020. He has been a member of the Dawn of Nemunas since 2024, and was a member of the New Union (Social Liberals) from 1998 to 2006, the Social Democratic Party from 2011 to 2016, the Lithuanian Regions Party from 2019 to 2020, and the Labour Party from 2020 to 2022. From 2000 to 2004, he served as a deputy speaker of the Seimas.
