= Vytautas Sinica =

Lithuanian politician (born 1990)

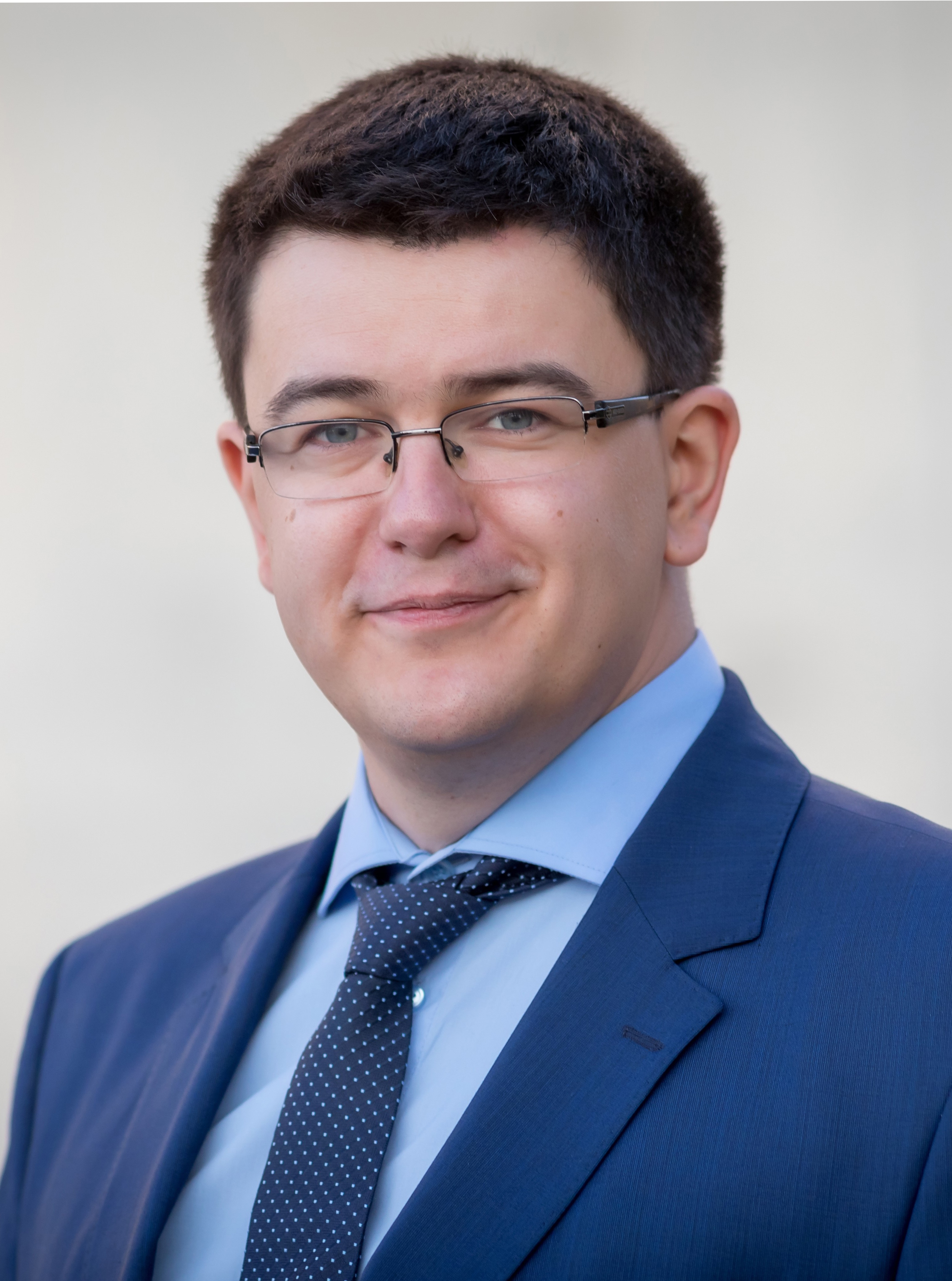
- Sinica in 2022

Member of the Seimas
- Incumbent
- Assumed office 14 November 2024
- Preceded by: Radvilė Morkūnaitė-Mikulėnienė
- Constituency: Pilaitė–Karoliniškės

Personal details
- Born: 4 February 1990 (age 36) Vilnius, Lithuania
- Party: National Alliance (2020–2025)
- Spouse: Eimantė Daukšaitė
- Children: 0
- Education: Vilnius University

Vytautas Sinica (born 4 February 1990) is a Lithuanian political scientist, writer and far-right wing politician. A founding member and vice-chairman of the National Alliance party, he was elected to the Seimas in the 2024 Lithuanian parliamentary election, becoming the party's first member of the Seimas.

== Biography ==
Sinica graduated from Vilnius University with a bachelor's degree in political science in 2013, a master's degree in comparative politics in 2015, and a doctor's degree in philosophy in 2022. He has authored over 100 articles on political science and philosophy and contributed to several projects on studies of Lithuanian and European politics. In 2015, he founded the non-profit publishing company "Centre for Statehood Studies" (Lithuanian: Valstybingumo studijų centras), which specializes in nationalist and political science literature.

From 2013, he was employed as a parliamentary assistant for Homeland Union member of the Seimas Agnė Bilotaitė. In 2016, he was fired after publishing an article criticizing the party's new leader Gabrielius Landsbergis. Later, he was employed as an assistant for Eugenijus Jovaiša, an independent in the parliamentary group of the Lithuanian Farmers and Greens Union.

Since 2020, he has been the chairman of the nationalist youth organization Pro Patria.

On August 15, 2025, it was reported that he had been expelled from National Alliance. Sinica said the decision was "nothing and invalid."

On June 22, 2026, Sinica announced his intention to take part in the 2027 spring mayoral elections.

== Political career ==
Alongside Vytautas Radžvilas and Rimantas Jonas Dagys, Sinica was an initiator of the initiative to establish a christian democratic party in 2019. Arvydas Juozaitis, philosopher and candidate in the 2019 Lithuanian presidential election, was also considered as a possible member of the party. However, after Dagys chose to establish the Christian Union and Juozaitis joined the Pensioners' Party, Sinica and Radžvilas established the National Alliance in 2020. Radžvilas became the party's chairman and Sinica the party's vice-chairman.

Sinica was elected as one of the party's three councillors in the Vilnius municipal council during the 2023 Lithuanian municipal elections. In the 2024 Lithuanian parliamentary election, he stood as the party's candidate in the Pilaitė–Karoliniškės constituency in Vilnius as well as the leader of the party's electoral list. Though the party received less than five percent of the vote, he advanced to the second round in his constituency alongside Homeland Union candidate Radvilė Morkūnaitė-Mikulėnienė, as the National Alliance's only candidate in the second round of the elections. Sinica won with 51.46 percent of the vote.

== Controversies ==
=== Claims about Vilnius' evacuation capacity ===
During the 2023 Vilnius mayoral campaign, Sinica stated that "Vilnius is practically impossible to evacuate" because of the city's street network and argued that the capital lacked sufficient shelters in the event of war. These statements were examined by LRT's fact-checking team, which found that emergency preparedness experts did not support such categorical conclusions and noted that shelter planning had changed following Russia's invasion of Ukraine. Sinica maintained that his comments reflected concerns about the city's infrastructure and emergency preparedness.

=== Statements on migration ===
Sinica's statements on migration have been the subject of criticism and fact-checking by Lithuanian media. During his 2023 campaign for Mayor of Vilnius and subsequent political commentary, he argued that Lithuania faced large-scale demographic change due to immigration and questioned government migration policies. LRT fact-checkers concluded that several of his claims relied on incomplete statistical context or presented broader conclusions than could be supported by the available evidence. Sinica rejected the criticism and defended his interpretation of migration data

Sinica has also been criticized for presenting broader conclusions about immigration, demographics and integration that opponents argue are not fully supported by available statistical evidence.

In 2026, critics argued that Sinica's opposition to Vilnius' integration strategy was inconsistent with his longstanding criticism of migrant integration. Sinica rejected that characterization, maintaining that integration programs cannot compensate for what he sees as excessive immigration and that reducing immigration should take priority.

=== False claims regarding foreign nationals and crime statistics ===
In February 2026, Sinica faced criticism after citing claims by fellow National Alliance member Marius Parčiauskas that foreign nationals in Lithuania were "almost twice as likely" to commit crimes as Lithuanian citizens while promoting legislation to deport foreign nationals convicted of intentional criminal offences.

An investigation by LRT concluded that the figures cited by the National Alliance did not correspond with official government statistics. According to data from Lithuania's Prison Service and the Ministry of the Interior, foreign nationals accounted for approximately 3% of the prison population and 4.5% of crime suspects in 2025, despite comprising around 8% of Lithuania's population, contradicting the party's assertion that foreigners were disproportionately represented among offenders.

=== Appearance at the 2026 Žemaičių Kalvarija pilgrimage ===
In July 2026, Sinica was among several Lithuanian politicians who addressed pilgrims during the annual Žemaičių Kalvarija indulgence festival, a major Catholic pilgrimage organized by the Diocese of Telšiai. His participation, alongside politicians including Remigijus Žemaitaitis and Alvydas Mockus, prompted public debate over the appropriateness of political speeches during religious events.

The appearance drew criticism from some Catholic commentators and theologians, who argued that allowing politicians to deliver speeches inside a church risked politicising the liturgy and dividing the faithful. Critics maintained that churches should remain places of worship rather than political platforms, regardless of the politicians' views.

== Personal life ==
Sinica married Eimantė Daukšaitė in 2020. The couple remains childless. Amongst his hobbies, Sinica includes travelling and walking.

Seimas
Preceded by Radvilė Morkūnaitė-Mikulėnienė	Member of the Seimas for Pilaitė and Karoliniškės; 2024–present	Incumbent
