= 2028 Lithuanian parliamentary election =

- 8 October 2028 (expected)
- All 141 seats in the Seimas; 71 seats needed for a majority
Party	Leader	Current seats
LSDP	Mindaugas Sinkevičius	53
TS–LKD	Laurynas Kasčiūnas	28
NA	Remigijus Žemaitaitis	17
DSVL	Virginijus Sinkevičius	13
LS	Viktorija Čmilytė-Nielsen	11
LVŽS	Aurelijus Veryga	6
LLRA–KŠS	Waldemar Tomaszewski	3
NS	Vytautas Sinica	1
TTS	Rimas Jonas Jankūnas	1
Independents	—N/a	7
Incumbent Prime Minister
Mindaugas Sinkevičius; LSDP

The next parliamentary elections in Lithuania are expected to be held on 8 October 2028, with a second round two weeks thereafter.

The 2026 Northern Nalšia district by-election will take place on 8 November 2026 to elect a new member of the Seimas following the death of Jevgenij Šuklin, a member of the Liberals' Movement.

== Electoral system ==
The Seimas has 141 members, elected to a four-year term in parallel voting, with 71 members elected in single-seat constituencies using the two-round system and 70 members elected by proportional representation. The voting in the elections is open to all citizens of Lithuania who are at least 18 years old.

Parliament members in the 71 single-seat constituencies are elected in a majority vote, with a run-off held within 15 days, if necessary. The remaining 70 seats are allocated to the participating political parties using the largest remainder method. Parties normally need to receive at least 5% (7% for multi-party electoral lists) of the votes to be eligible for a seat. Candidates take the seats allocated to their parties based on the preference lists submitted before the election and adjusted by preference votes given by the voters.

== Political parties ==
The table below lists the political parties currently represented in the Seimas following the 2024 parliamentary election.

Name		Ideology	Position	Leader	2024 result		Current
Name		Ideology	Position	Leader	Votes (%)	Seats	
LSDP	Social Democratic Party of Lithuania; Lietuvos socialdemokratų partija	Social democracy	Centre-left	Mindaugas Sinkevičius	19.70%	52 / 141	51 / 141
TS–LKD	Homeland Union – Lithuanian Christian Democrats; Tėvynės sąjunga – Lietuvos krikščionys demokratai	Christian democracy; Liberal conservatism	Centre-right	Laurynas Kasčiūnas	18.35%	28 / 141	28 / 141
NA	Dawn of Nemunas; Nemuno aušra	Right-wing populism; Anti-establishment	Right-wing	Remigijus Žemaitaitis	15.26%	20 / 141	17 / 141
DSVL	Union of Democrats "For Lithuania"; Demokratų sąjunga „Vardan Lietuvos“	Third Way; Green conservatism	Centre to centre-left	Virginijus Sinkevičius	9.40%	14 / 141	13 / 141
LS	Liberals' Movement; Liberalų sąjūdis	Classical liberalism	Centre to centre-right	Viktorija Čmilytė-Nielsen	7.85%	12 / 141	11 / 141
LVŽS	Lithuanian Farmers and Greens Union; Lietuvos valstiečių ir žaliųjų sąjunga	Agrarianism; Green conservatism	Centre-left to left-wing	Aurelijus Veryga	7.16%	8 / 141	6 / 141
LLRA –KŠS	Electoral Action of Poles in Lithuania – Christian Families Alliance; Lietuvos lenkų rinkimų akcija – Krikščioniškų šeimų sąjunga	Christian democracy; Polish minority interests	Centre-right	Waldemar Tomaszewski	3.96%	3 / 141	3 / 141
NS	National Alliance; Nacionalinis susivienijimas	Lithuanian nationalism	Far-right	Vytautas Sinica	2.93%	1 / 141	1 / 141
TTS	People and Justice Union (Centrists, Nationalists); Tautos ir teisingumo sąjunga (centristai, tautininkai)	National conservatism; Euroscepticism	Far-right	Rimas Jonas Jankūnas	1.41%	0 / 141	1 / 141
—N/a	Independents	—N/a				2 / 141	7 / 141

== Opinion polls ==
LOESS curve of the polling for the 2028 Lithuanian parliamentary election.

Parliamentary election poll results are listed in the table below in reverse chronological order. The highest percentage figure in each poll is displayed in bold, and its background is shaded in the leading party's colour. The "Lead" column shows the percentage point difference between the two parties with the highest figures. Undecided voters have been excluded and the polls reweighted accordingly.

=== 2026 ===
Polling firm	Fieldwork dates	Sample size	LSDP	TS– LKD	NA	DSVL	LS	LVŽS	LP	LLRA −KŠS	NS	DP	LRP	LŽP	TTS	CDS	LV	Others	Lead
Baltijos tyrimai	23 Oct−9 Nov	1,020	14.7	**17.5**	13.6	6.9	9.7	13.6	5.1	4.0	6.2	3.2	2.8	—N/a	2.3	—N/a	—N/a	0.3	2.8
Spinter tyrimai	23−30 Oct	1,005	13.9	**25.6**	7.8	8.1	12.0	9.8	3.1	—N/a	5.8	—N/a	—N/a	—N/a	—N/a	—N/a	—N/a	13.9	11.7
Baltijos tyrimai	23 Sep−5 Oct	1,025	16.3	**20.7**	14.1	6.2	7.7	13.9	3.5	4.3	6.6	3.2	2.0	—N/a	1.5	—N/a	—N/a	0.1	4.4
Spinter tyrimai	16−26 Sep	1,020	13.4	**24.5**	12.7	5.0	11.6	10.5	3.5	—N/a	6.1	—N/a	—N/a	—N/a	—N/a	—N/a	—N/a	12.7	11.1
Baltijos tyrimai	20−31 Aug	1,002	17.0	**17.4**	12.4	7.3	9.0	14.3	3.0	4.1	7.2	4.1	2.2	—N/a	1.9	—N/a	—N/a	0.1	0.4
Baltijos tyrimai	21−31 Jul	1,002	15.2	**19.3**	15.3	7.2	10.3	11.6	3.4	3.7	3.6	4.7	2.1	—N/a	2.2	—N/a	1.4	0.1	4.0
Spinter tyrimai	18−28 Jul	1,022	14.3	**22.9**	12.0	6.5	11.5	7.9	5.2	—N/a	6.1	—N/a	—N/a	—N/a	—N/a	—N/a	—N/a	13.5	8.6
	14 Jul	The Sinkevičius Cabinet is sworn in																	
Baltijos tyrimai	19−30 Jun	1,010	16.1	**16.7**	14.0	8.0	9.2	13.6	3.7	2.9	5.3	5.7	2.7	—N/a	1.9	—N/a	—N/a	0.1	0.6
Spinter tyrimai	18−28 Jun	1,022	16.9	**24.4**	8.4	5.0	12.6	8.1	3.3	—N/a	5.6	—N/a	—N/a	—N/a	—N/a	—N/a	—N/a	15.7	7.5
	16 Jun	Mindaugas Sinkevičius nominated for Prime Minister																	
	6 Jun	LSDP decides to remove NA from the coalition, replace them with DSVL																	
Baltijos tyrimai	21−31 May	1,011	**17.9**	16.9	12.4	5.2	10.4	14.4	4.1	4.0	2.3	6.6	3.0	—N/a	2.5	—N/a	—N/a	0.3	1.0
Spinter tyrimai	18–30 May	1,022	13.3	**23.2**	9.4	2.9	11.3	8.5	4.4	—N/a	5.8	—N/a	—N/a	—N/a	—N/a	—N/a	—N/a	21.2	9.9
Baltijos tyrimai	23 Apr−7 May	1,000	**18.1**	16.7	16.5	5.1	11.4	14.3	2.9	2.9	2.8	5.0	3.1	—N/a	1.2	—N/a	—N/a	2.8	1.4
Spinter tyrimai	18–28 Apr	1,021	11.9	**24.8**	10.3	5.2	12.1	13.3	3.4	—N/a	5.6	—N/a	—N/a	—N/a	—N/a	—N/a	—N/a	13.3	11.5
	13 Apr	Virginijus Sinkevičius elected leader of DSVL																	
	10 Apr	Saulius Skvernelis resigns as leader of DSVL after bribery allegations																	
Baltijos tyrimai	19−30 Mar	1,009	17.4	**18.3**	12.6	12.3	7.8	12.8	2.7	3.7	3.9	4.9	2.6	—N/a	—N/a	—N/a	—N/a	0.5	0.9
Spinter tyrimai	18–28 Mar	1,013	13.6	**23.3**	9.1	7.4	13.6	8.5	5.4	—N/a	4.8	—N/a	—N/a	—N/a	—N/a	—N/a	—N/a	14.4	9.7
Baltijos tyrimai	19 Feb−2 Mar	1,014	**17.7**	15.9	13.1	12.2	8.3	13.2	3.2	4.1	—N/a	5.3	—N/a	—N/a	—N/a	—N/a	—N/a	7.0	1.8
Spinter tyrimai	18–28 Feb	1,015	11.4	**21.9**	11.6	6.8	13.3	9.6	4.0	—N/a	5.1	—N/a	—N/a	—N/a	—N/a	—N/a	—N/a	16.2	10.3
Spinter tyrimai	19–29 Jan	1,017	11.2	**20.4**	11.5	10.9	11.2	11.6	6.6	—N/a	3.2	3.3	—N/a	—N/a	—N/a	—N/a	—N/a	9.8	8.8
Baltijos tyrimai	8–24 Jan	1,063	**17.7**	16.4	13.5	14.0	9.4	14.6	2.8	3.1	—N/a	3.7	—N/a	—N/a	—N/a	—N/a	—N/a	4.7	1.3

=== 2025 ===
Polling firm	Fieldwork dates	Sample size	LSDP	TS– LKD	NA	DSVL	LS	LVŽS	LP	LLRA −KŠS	NS	DP	LRP	LŽP	TTS	CDS	Others	Lead
Baltijos tyrimai	11–29 Dec	1,015	**17.8**	14.9	14.2	17.7	7.8	13.5	2.7	4.3	—N/a	2.7	—N/a	—N/a	—N/a	—N/a	4.4	0.1
Vilmorus	12–30 Dec	1,000	19.1	**21.6**	16.8	13.7	11.1	12.1	—N/a	—N/a	—N/a	—N/a	—N/a	—N/a	—N/a	—N/a	5.6	2.5
Spinter tyrimai	13–22 Dec	1,000	13.8	**24.6**	9.2	9.5	10.9	9.2	7.4	—N/a	3.7	1.6	—N/a	—N/a	—N/a	—N/a	10.1	10.8
	Dec	LRT Law Amendments Filibuster																
Spinter tyrimai	17–28 Nov	1,015	14.3	**21.7**	8.6	13.0	9.0	11.1	6.3	—N/a	4.0	—N/a	—N/a	—N/a	—N/a	—N/a	11.9	7.4
Baltijos tyrimai	11–29 Nov	1,019	**16.9**	16.7	12.1	15.8	7.7	13.6	3.4	4.4	—N/a	4.2	—N/a	—N/a	—N/a	—N/a	5.0	0.2
Vilmorus	6–16 Nov	1,000	20.1	**22.9**	16.7	15.6	8.9	12.4	—N/a	—N/a	—N/a	—N/a	—N/a	—N/a	—N/a	—N/a	3.5	2.8
	11 Nov	Robertas Kaunas replaces Dovilė Šakalienė as Minister of National Defence																
Baltijos tyrimai	16–28 Oct	1,019	**16.2**	15.2	11.6	14.4	9.6	14.4	3.2	4.2	—N/a	4.3	—N/a	—N/a	—N/a	—N/a	6.9	1.0
Spinter tyrimai	17–27 Oct	1,015	19.1	**22.0**	8.5	13.5	8.5	9.7	6.0	—N/a	3.1	—N/a	—N/a	—N/a	—N/a	—N/a	9.1	2.9
	3 Oct	Ignotas Adomavičius resigns as Minister of Culture																
Baltijos tyrimai	24 Sep−9 Oct	1,004	**20.0**	18.6	12.3	14.4	7.6	12.7	2.8	3.6	—N/a	3.3	—N/a	—N/a	—N/a	—N/a	4.6	1.4
Spinter tyrimai	17–27 Sep	1,017	15.7	**21.7**	12.7	10.6	9.7	10.3	5.3	2.9	3.1	—N/a	—N/a	—N/a	—N/a	—N/a	7.6	6.0
	25 Sep	The Ruginienė Cabinet is sworn in																
	22 Sep	Ignotas Adomavičius nominated for Minister of Culture; Cultural community protests begin																
Vilmorus	4–13 Sep	1,000	**24.3**	20.7	17.6	13.7	8.7	11.6	—N/a	—N/a	—N/a	—N/a	—N/a	—N/a	—N/a	—N/a	3.4	3.6
Baltijos tyrimai	21 Aug−2 Sep	1,006	**21.9**	15.3	11.7	12.2	9.5	12.8	4.5	4.0	1.0	3.7	2.9	—N/a	—N/a	—N/a	0.5	6.6
	6 Aug	Inga Ruginienė nominated for Prime Minister																
	31 Jul	Gintautas Paluckas resigns as Prime Minister and leader of LSDP after corruption scandal																
Spinter tyrimai	18–25 Jul	1,009	15.5	**19.7**	5.2	14.1	10.5	9.3	6.2	3.8	—N/a	—N/a	—N/a	—N/a	—N/a	—N/a	15.7	4.2
Spinter tyrimai	19–29 Jun	1,019	17.0	**17.7**	7.3	10.8	13.8	7.9	5.6	4.7	—N/a	—N/a	—N/a	—N/a	—N/a	—N/a	15.2	0.7
Vilmorus	11–22 Jun	1,000	**23.8**	17.0	15.1	17.1	11.7	12.1	—N/a	—N/a	—N/a	—N/a	—N/a	—N/a	—N/a	—N/a	3.2	6.7
Spinter tyrimai	26 Apr − 18 May	1,015	**19.6**	18.1	8.0	10.8	9.1	7.8	2.8	3.0	—N/a	—N/a	—N/a	—N/a	—N/a	—N/a	20.8	1.5
Vilmorus	2−12 May	1,000	**25.3**	16.4	12.9	20.0	11.0	10.5	—N/a	—N/a	—N/a	—N/a	—N/a	—N/a	—N/a	—N/a	3.9	5.3
Spinter tyrimai	18−29 Apr	1,019	**20.7**	18.1	9.3	13.3	8.9	10.0	3.9	2.9	—N/a	—N/a	—N/a	—N/a	—N/a	—N/a	12.9	2.6
Vilmorus	17−28 Apr	1,000	**24.7**	17.7	18.7	16.1	8.1	10.1	—N/a	—N/a	—N/a	—N/a	—N/a	—N/a	—N/a	—N/a	4.6	6.0
Baltijos tyrimai	5−19 Apr	1,015	**20.0**	13.8	13.8	16.6	6.9	12.1	2.6	4.4	1.4	4.5	3.2	—N/a	—N/a	—N/a	0.7	3.4
	8 Feb	Gintautas Paluckas elected leader of LSDP																
Spinter tyrimai	18−28 Mar	1,012	**18.7**	18.4	10.4	11.3	9.8	10.3	5.3	—N/a	3.2	—N/a	—N/a	—N/a	—N/a	—N/a	12.6	0.3
Baltijos tyrimai	8−24 Mar	1,020	**22.0**	15.3	13.2	15.0	7.3	8.3	2.2	3.0	—N/a	4.8	2.1	—N/a	—N/a	2.7	4.1	6.7
	1 Mar	Aurelijus Veryga elected leader of LVŽS																
Norstat LT (Note: Commissioned by TS-LKD)	10–28 Feb	1,500	15.6	**27.1**	12.7	10.6	11.2	5.9	5.9	—N/a	—N/a	—N/a	—N/a	—N/a	—N/a	—N/a	11.0	11.5
Vilmorus	14–23 Feb	1,000	**22.1**	14.4	21.7	16.2	9.0	11.4	—N/a	—N/a	—N/a	—N/a	—N/a	—N/a	—N/a	—N/a	5.2	0.4
	8 Feb	Laurynas Kasčiūnas elected leader of TS-LKD																
Baltijos tyrimai	25 Jan–8 Feb	1,019	**22.6**	11.7	17.4	17.9	5.4	10.6	2.1	2.0	1.4	4.4	2.1	1.8	—N/a	2.0	2.9	4.7
Spinter tyrimai	18–29 Jan	1,009	**16.3**	15.9	13.0	12.3	11.8	9.1	4.2	—N/a	3.3	—N/a	—N/a	—N/a	—N/a	—N/a	14.1	0.4

=== 2024 ===
Polling firm	Fieldwork dates	Sample size	LSDP	TS– LKD	NA	DSVL	LS	LVŽS	LP	LLRA −KŠS	NS	DP	LRP	LŽP	TTS	CDS	Others	Lead
Spinter tyrimai	13–20 Dec	1,016	**18.4**	17.3	17.9	11.1	11.5	9.2	3.3	—N/a	—N/a	—N/a	—N/a	—N/a	—N/a	—N/a	11.3	**0.5**
	12 Dec	The Paluckas Cabinet is sworn in																
Baltijos tyrimai	12 Nov–1 Dec	1,018	**22.9**	13.7	17.1	14.8	4.8	8.5	2.1	3.5	1.0	3.3	3.4	1.2	0.3	2.9	0.5	**5.8**
Vilmorus	7–16 Nov (Note: The survey included only parties with parliamentary representation.)	1,000	**24.3**	11.8	20.7	10.8	13.5	9.6	—N/a	2.2	3.1	—N/a	—N/a	—N/a	—N/a	1.9	2.1	**3.6**
Baltijos tyrimai	30 Oct–12 Nov	1,019	18.8	13.4	**20.3**	14.1	6.9	10.2	3.0	2.7	1.1	3.4	2.4	1.5	0.3	1.9	0.1	**1.5**
	30 Oct	Vilija Blinkevičiūtė refuses to become Prime Minister; Gintautas Paluckas nominated for Prime Minister																
2024 election	13 Oct	1,220,570	**19.70**	18.35	15.26	9.4	7.85	7.16	4.62	3.96	2.93	2.24 (Note: Results of Coalition of Peace)	1.93	1.72	1.41	0.77	2.7	**1.35**

== See also ==
- Elections in Lithuania
