= Radvilė Morkūnaitė-Mikulėnienė =

Lithuanian politician (born 1984)

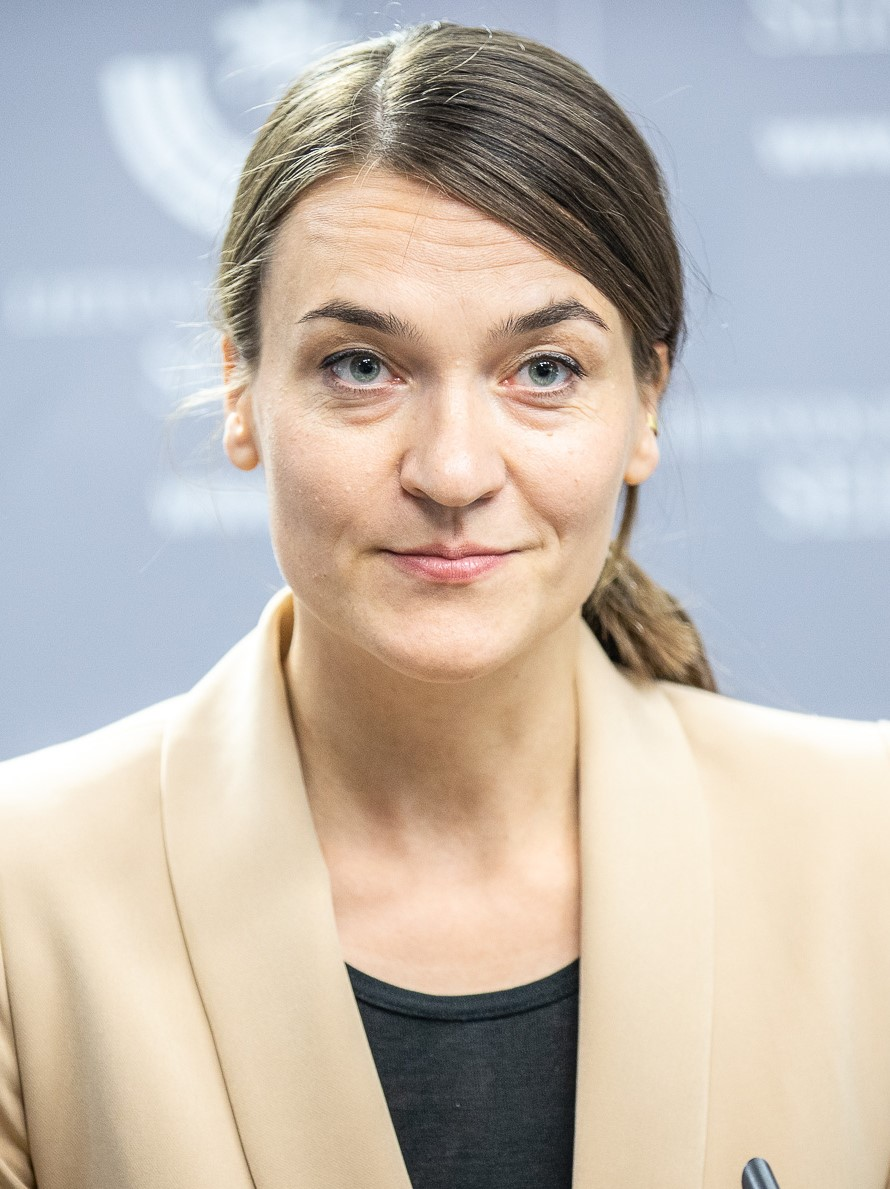
- Morkūnaitė-Mikulėnienė in 2023

Deputy Speaker of the Seimas
- Incumbent
- Assumed office 14 November 2024
- In office 17 November 2020 – 27 June 2024
- Preceded by: Gediminas Kirkilas
- Succeeded by: Žygimantas Pavilionis

Minister of Education, Science and Sports
- In office 27 June 2024 – 14 November 2024
- Prime Minister: Ingrida Šimonytė
- Preceded by: Gintautas Jakštas
- Succeeded by: Gintarė Skaistė (interim)

Member of the Seimas
- Incumbent
- Assumed office 14 November 2024
- Constituency: Mulit-member
- In office 13 November 2020 – 14 November 2024
- Constituency: Pilaitė–Karoliniškės
- Preceded by: Saulius Skvernelis
- Succeeded by: Vytautas Sinica
- In office 14 November 2016 – 12 November 2020
- Constituency: Mulit-member

Chairwoman of Homeland Union
- Acting
- In office 28 October 2024 – 15 March 2025
- Preceded by: Gabrielius Landsbergis
- Succeeded by: Laurynas Kasčiūnas

First Deputy Chairperson of the Homeland Union
- In office 26 September 2021 – 15 March 2025
- Preceded by: Irena Degutienė
- Succeeded by: Paulius Saudargas

Deputy Chairperson of the Homeland Union
- Incumbent
- Assumed office 15 March 2025
- In office 25 April 2015 – 26 September 2021

Member of the European Parliament
- In office 14 July 2009 – 30 June 2014
- Constituency: Lithuania

Personal details
- Born: Radvilė Morkūnaitė; 2 January 1984 (age 42) Kaunas, Lithuanian SSR, Soviet Union
- Party: Homeland Union
- Spouse: Mindaugas Mikulėnas
- Children: 2
- Education: Lithuanian Academy of Music and Theatre; Vilnius Academy of Arts

Radvilė Morkūnaitė-Mikulėnienė (née Morkūnaitė; born 2 January 1984) is a Lithuanian politician and the incumbent Deputy Speaker of the Seimas and Deputy Chairwoman of the Homeland Union. She has served as a Member of the Seimas since 2016, and has additionally served as Deputy Speaker of the Seimas, Minister of Education, Science and Sports, First Deputy Chairwoman of the Homeland Union and as acting chairwoman of Homeland Union since 28 October 2024 until 15 March 2025.

== Background ==
Morkūnaitė was born in 1984 in Kaunas, to an ethnographer family. Her father Eligijus Morkūnas was a member of Sąjūdis and a long-time employee of the open-air ethnographic museum in Rumšiškės, awarded with the Knight's Cross of the Order of the Grand Duke Gediminas of Lithuania in 2023. Her great-grandfather Antanas Morkūnas was the burgomaster of Kėdainiai from 1924 to 1927 and belonged to a notable local family.

Morkūnaitė graduated from the Juozas Naujalis Music Gymnasium in 2002 and obtained a bachelor's degree in piano performance at the Lithuanian Academy of Music and Theatre in 2006. In 2008, she obtained a master's degree in cultural management and cultural policy at the UNESCO Department of the Vilnius Academy of Arts. She has been a member of the youth organization Young Conservative League since 2002 and served as its chairwoman from 2006 to 2007.

== Political career ==
She was elected to the European Parliament as a member of the Homeland Union in the 2009 European Parliament election and remained until 2014. She was a member of the Committee on the Environment, Public Health and Food Safety.

She endorsed Gabrielius Landsbergis in the 2015 Homeland Union – Lithuanian Christian Democrats leadership election. After his victory, she was appointed vice chairwoman of the Homeland Union. Since 2021, she has been First Vice Chairwoman of the party.

She ran as the Homeland Union candidate in the 2015 by-election in the Žirmūnai constituency, but lost to Liberal Movement candidate Šarūnas Gustainis in the second round. She was elected to the Seimas in the 2016 parliamentary election as a member of the Homeland Union electoral list. In the 2020 parliamentary election, she defeated outgoing Prime Minister Saulius Skvernelis in the Pilaitė–Karoliniškės constituency with a wide margin. She supports the legalization of same-sex unions in Lithuania.

Since 2020, until becoming minister, she was the chair of the Homeland Union parliamentary group, as well as Deputy Speaker of the Seimas and chair of the European Affairs Committee. On 27 June 2024, Morkūnaitė-Mikulėnienė was appointed as the new Minister of Education, Science and Sports, replacing Gintautas Jakštas, who had resigned in April over failed reforms to the education system, particularly the implementation of intermediary examination, which has been plagued by a number of setbacks and technical issues.

== Personal life ==
Morkūnaitė-Mikulėnienė is the chairwoman of the Freedom Fighters Remembrance Association "Neužmiršk" (English: Do Not Forget). She was one of the initiators of "Green Code" in 2010, a visual arts contest on promoting ecology and environmental responsibility.

She is married and has two children. Besides her native Lithuanian, she speaks English, Italian and Russian.

Seimas
| Preceded by Saulius Skvernelis (Karoliniškės) | Member of the Seimas for Pilaitė and Karoliniškės; 2020–2024 | Succeeded by Vytautas Sinica |
