= Together with the Vytis =

Together with the Vytis Kartu su Vyčiu
- Leader: Vaclovas Žutautas
- Founded: June 14, 2007
- Headquarters: Kaunas
- Membership: 2,735 members (2023)
- Ideology: Pensioner interests Lithuanian nationalism Euroscepticism
- Seimas: 0 / 141
- European Parliament: 0 / 11
- Municipal councils and mayors: 0 / 1,558

Together with the Vytis (Lithuanian: Partija "Kartu su Vyčiu") is a minor right-wing political party in Lithuania which was founded in 2007. It is led by engineer Vaclovas Žutautas. The party has not achieved significant success in Lithuanian elections.

== History ==
=== Lithuanian Pensioners' Party ===
The party was founded as the Lithuanian Pensioners' Party (Lithuanian: Lietuvos pensininkų partija) on 14 June 2007. It described itself as a pensioners' party and its foundation was motivated by injustice towards retired persons in Lithuania. The party's founder, Vytautas Jurgis Kadžys, was a retired army officer who formerly belonged to the far-right Lithuanian Nationalist Union and National Democratic Party of Lithuania. However, Kadžys claimed that the party belongs to neither the political left nor the right and will cooperate with parties from the entire political spectrum.

It protested Lithuania's accession to the Eurozone and demanded pensions to be indexed with inflation.

It participated in the 2011 municipal elections and received 0.37% of the vote, but did not win any mandates. It finished with a worse result in the municipal elections of 2015 and ceased participating in municipal elections.

In 2016, it joined Naglis Puteikis, 2014 presidential election candidate and former Homeland Union member of the Seimas, and journalist Kristupas Krivickas in the "Anti-Corruption Coalition". A wide coalition of anti-establishment parties, it was also joined by the Lithuanian Centre Party, the Centre of Trade Unions, the Lithuanian Christian Democracy Party, and former National Resurrection Party member Ligitas Kernagis. Though the coalition received 6.32% of the vote, it did not reach the 7% threshold required for multi-party coalitions and did not win proportional seats.

=== Union of Intergenerational Solidarity ===
In January 2020, the party was joined by philosopher Arvydas Juozaitis, who was elected the new party chairman. Juozaitis was a candidate in the 2019 presidential election and campaigned against globalisation and European integration, and had intended to found his own party, but failed to gather the required number of founding members. The party was renamed to the Union of Intergenerational Solidarity - Cohesion for Lithuania (Lithuanian: Kartų solidarumo sąjunga - Santalka Lietuvai), and it was joined by former Order and Justice MP Juozas Imbrasas, giving it its first and only member in the Seimas. The new chairman reasserted the party's defense of pensioner interests, while at the same time requesting youth members, claiming that the party's members require help with modern technology.

Two other right-wing parties founded in the leadup to the 2020 parliamentary election, the National Alliance and Christian Union, originally considered unifying with Juozaitis' movement, but split and the three parties denounced one another.

Juozaitis described it as a "people's party" and claimed that it seeks to replicate the grassroots success of Barack Obama in Lithuania. It received 0.51% of the vote in the election and did not win a single mandate.

Juozaitis resigned as party chairman after the election, on 30 November 2020.

=== Together with the Vytis ===
In June 2021, the party was renamed to its current name, and Vaclovas Žutautas was elected as its new chairman.

In 2022, the Central Electoral Commission seized €6,500 of membership fees after declaring the rate collected as exceeding the maximum of 10% from persons income and subsequently illegal.

It endorsed Valdas Tutkus in the 2024 presidential election; however, he failed to gather the necessary amount of signatures to be registered as a candidate.

== Platform ==
"Together with the Vytis" supports pensioners' interests, such as indexing of pensions and reform to the retirement fund system. It defines itself as a nationalist party which seeks to defend Lithuanian national values and family values.

It presents itself as an anti-establishment party opposed to a "moral neo-Marxist revolution from the West" and supports geopolitical neutrality. The party also supports nationalization of strategic sectors of the economy, abandoning the Euro and restoring the Lithuanian litas.

== Election results ==
=== Seimas ===
Election	Votes (Note: Proportional representation votes.)	%	Seats	+/–	Government
2016 (Note: As a member of the "Anti-Corruption Coalition of Kristupas Krivickas and Naglis Puteikis".)	77,144	6.32 (#5)	0 / 141		Opposition
2020	5,808	0.51 (#16)	0 / 141	0	Opposition

=== Municipal ===
Election	Votes (Note: Municipal council election votes.)	%	Council seats	Mayors	+/–
2011	4,136	0.37 (#17)	0 / 1,466	0 / 60	
2015	943	0.08 (#20)	0 / 1,473	0 / 60	0
2019	Did not compete	Did not compete	0 / 1,442	0 / 60	0
2023	Did not compete	Did not compete	0 / 1,498	0 / 60	0
