= Radžvilas =

Radžvilas is a Lithuanian-language surname. Notable people with the surname include:

- Jonas Radžvilas, pen name of Kostas Korsakas (1909–1986), Lithuanian and Soviet literary researcher, critic, philologist, poet, and public figure
- Vytautas Radžvilas (born 1958), Lithuanian philosopher, political scientist, translator, and public figure

== See also ==
- Radvila
