= Karoliniškės Pet Cemetery =

Animal cemetery in Vilnius, Lithuania

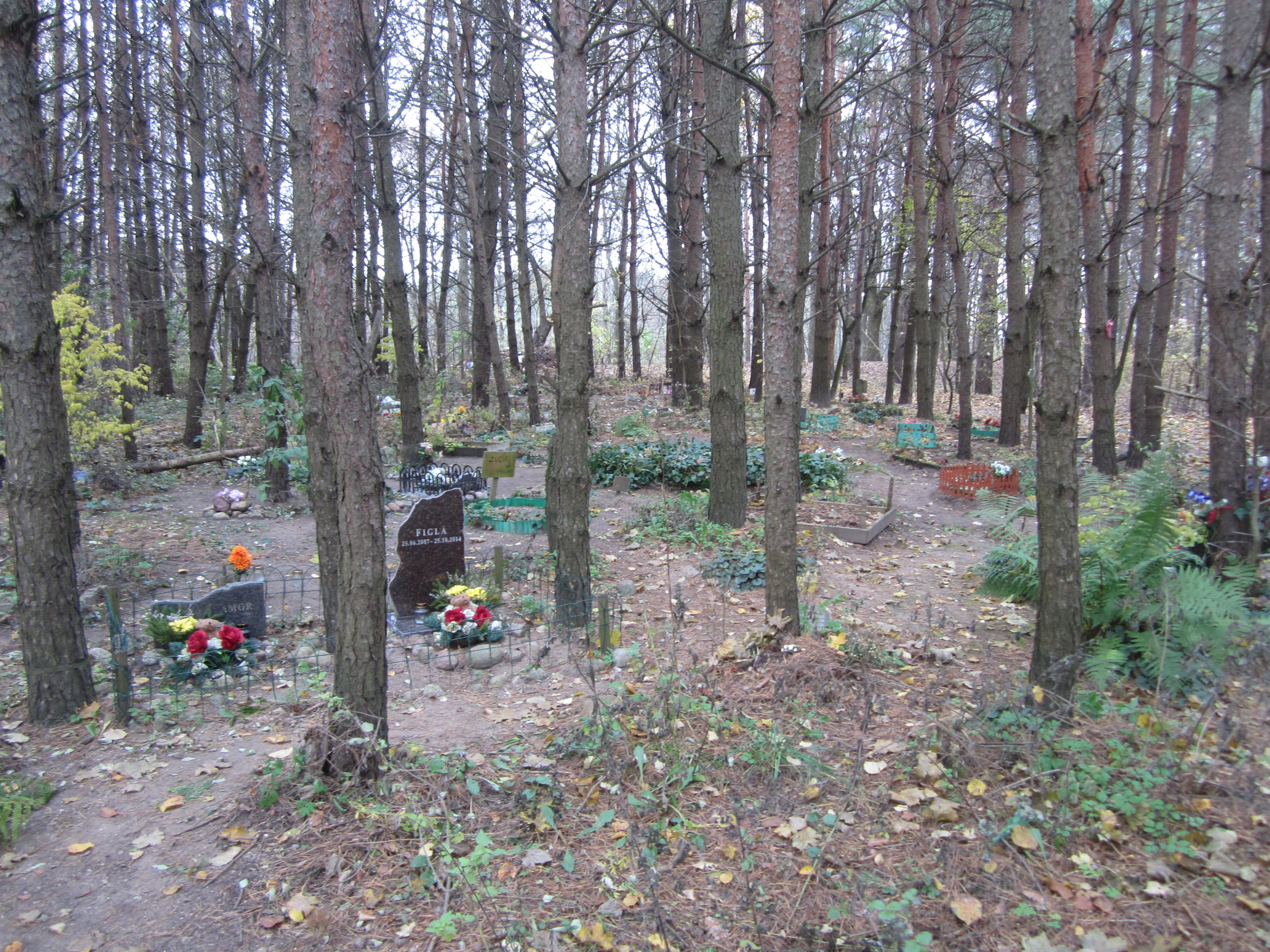
General view of the cemetery

Karoliniškės Pet Cemetery (Lithuanian: Karoliniškių naminių gyvūnų kapinės) is an illegal pet cemetery located in the Lithuanian capital Vilnius, in the Karoliniškės neighborhood, in a small forest southeast of the Vilnius TV Tower.

== History ==
The history of the cemetery's origin is unknown. Based on the oldest dated tombstone (from 1970), it can be inferred that pets have been buried here since the establishment of the Karoliniškės district.

In 2009, after media reports about foxes digging up graves and feeding on deceased pets, the Vilnius City Municipality considered the possibility of legalizing the cemetery. At the time, the head of the Karoliniškės Eldership, Violeta Gedminaitė, opposed legalization, and the cemetery was not legalized.

In 2012, there were announcements about relocating the graves to the newly established Vilnius City Pet Cemetery (opened in 2011) and closing the illegal burial site. In 2015, Vilnius Mayor Remigijus Šimašius stated his intention to pursue the cemetery's legalization.

Currently, burying pets in this cemetery may result in a fine.

== Gallery ==
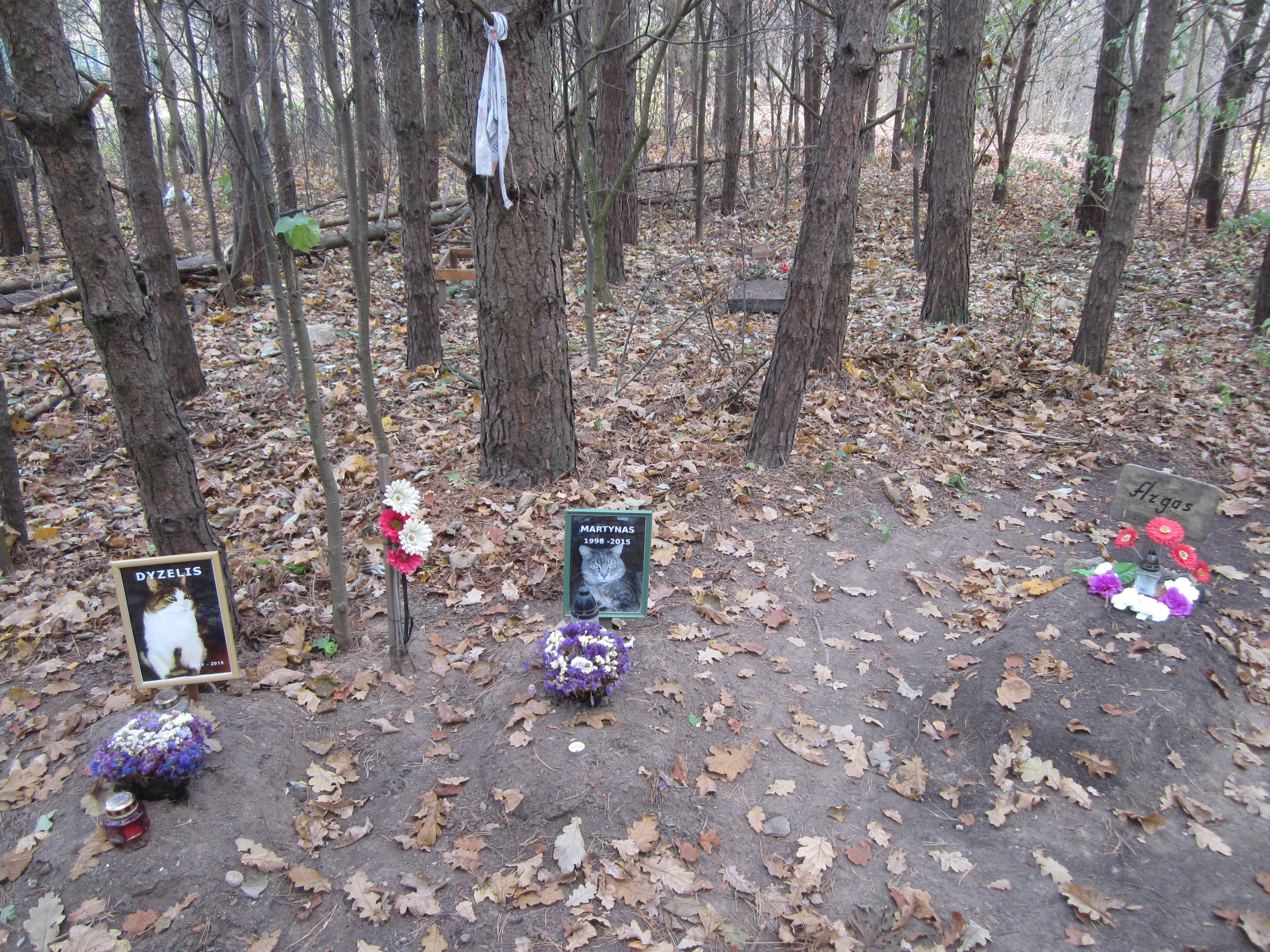
Graves of two cats with photographs

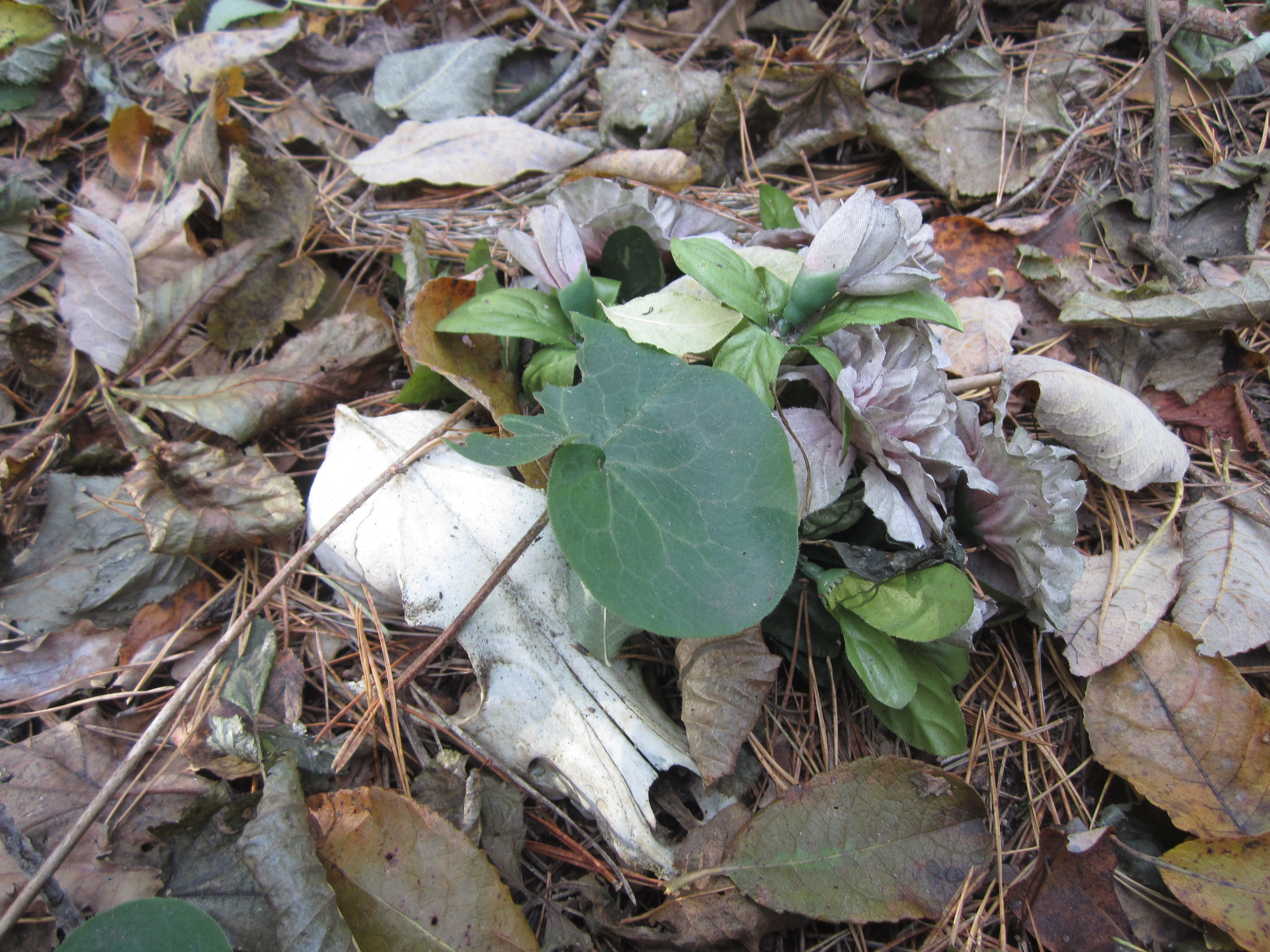
Animal skull

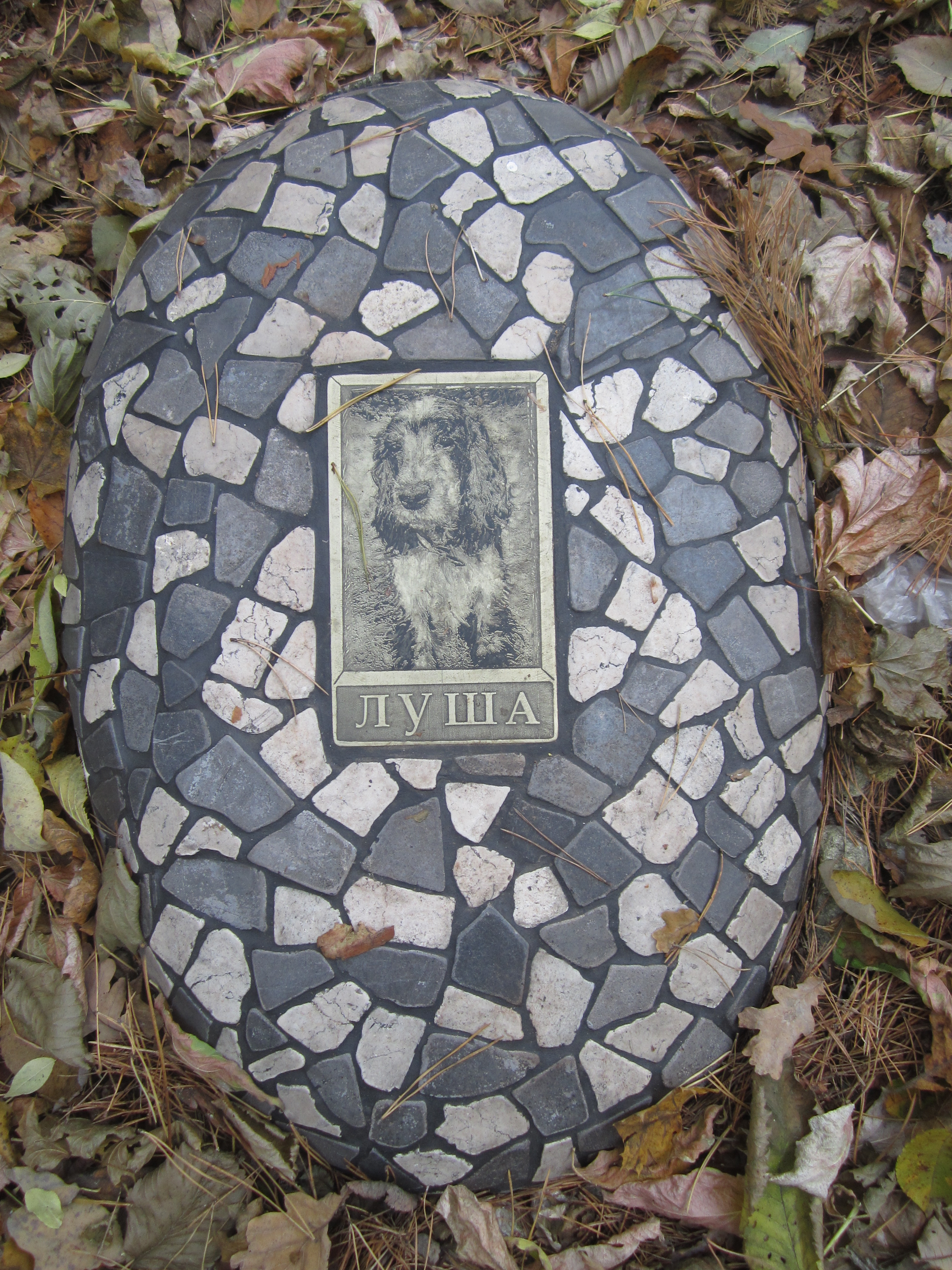
A dog's tombstone

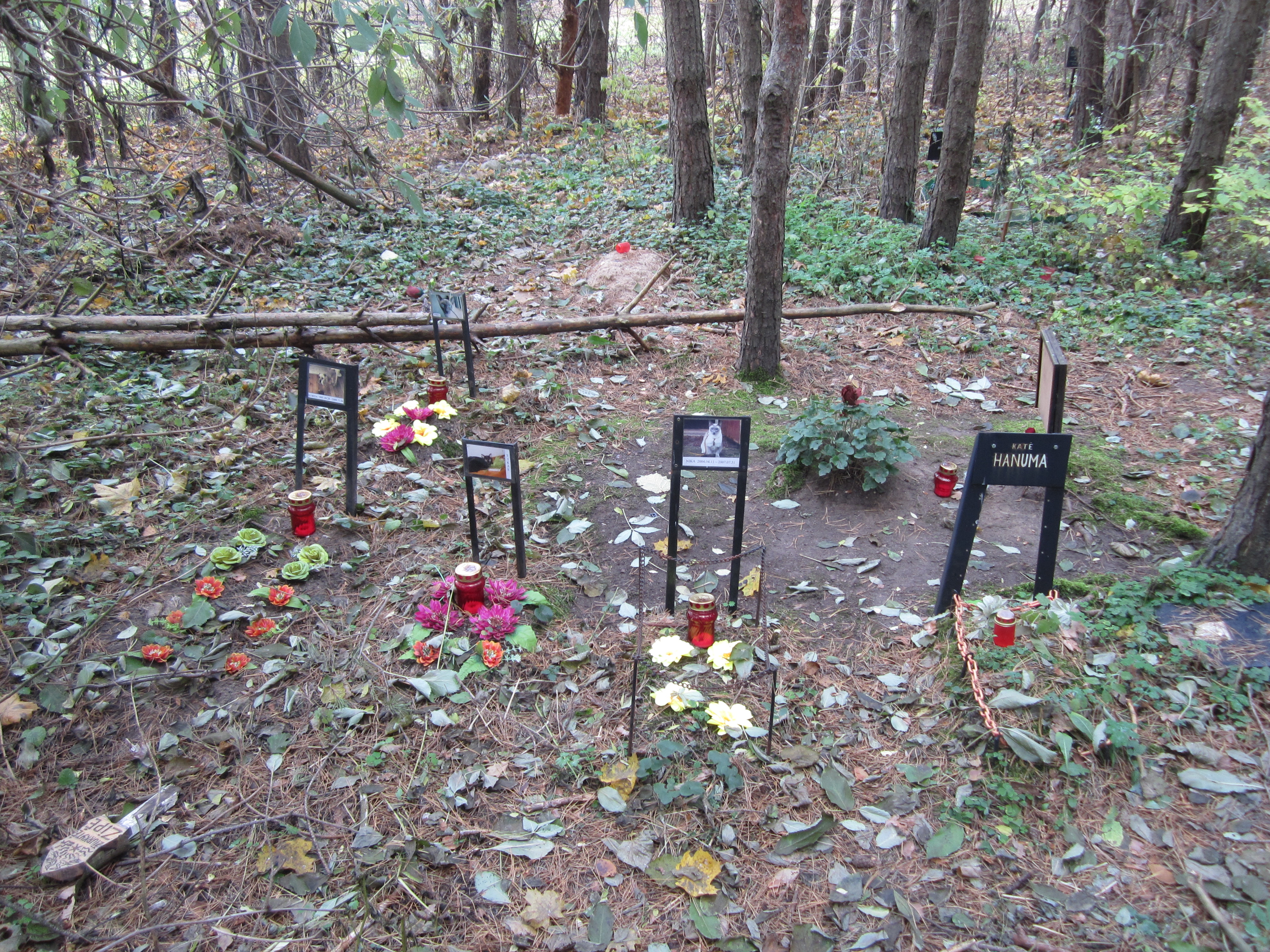
Graves of four cats and a dog with photographs

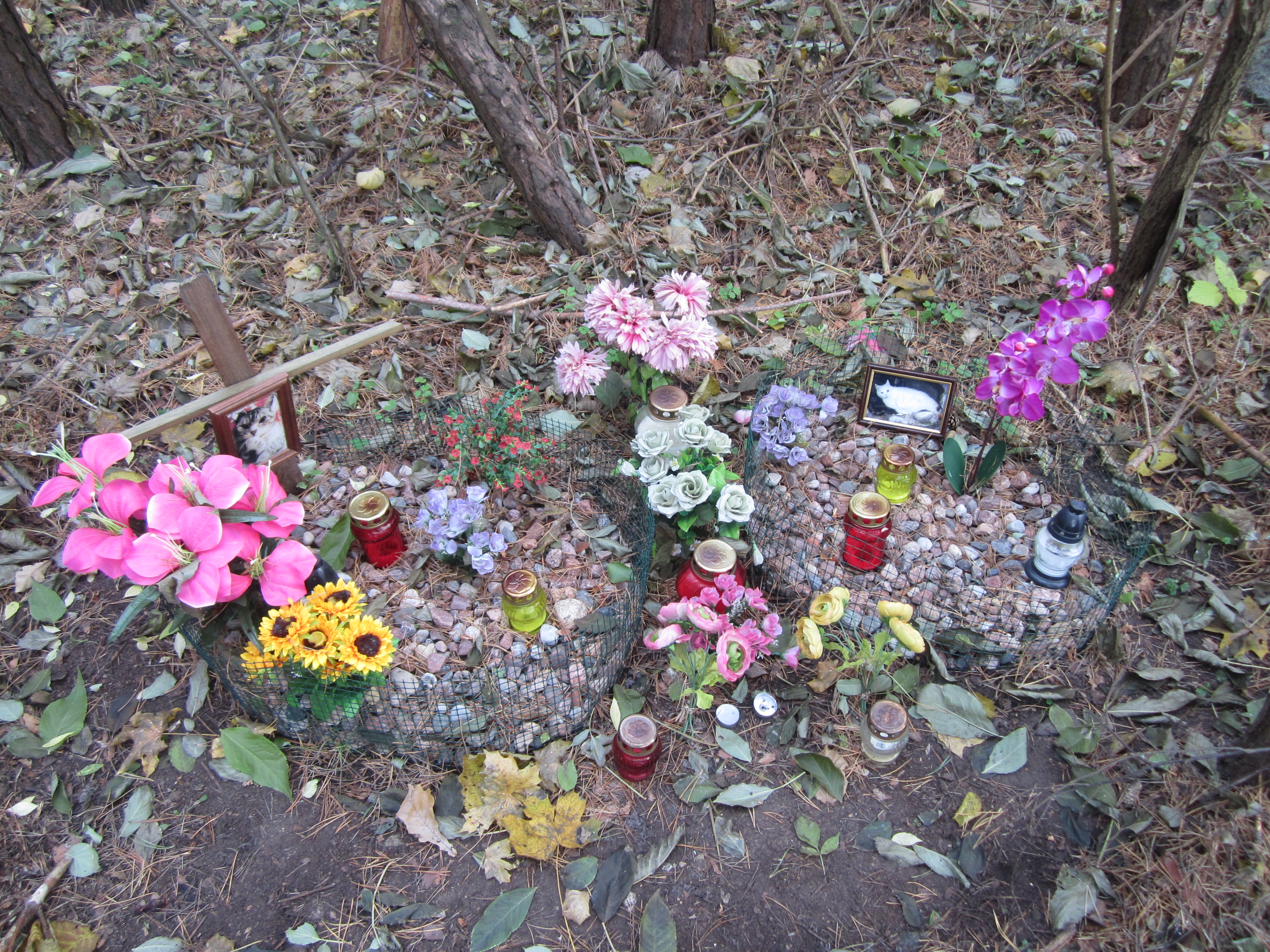
Cat graves

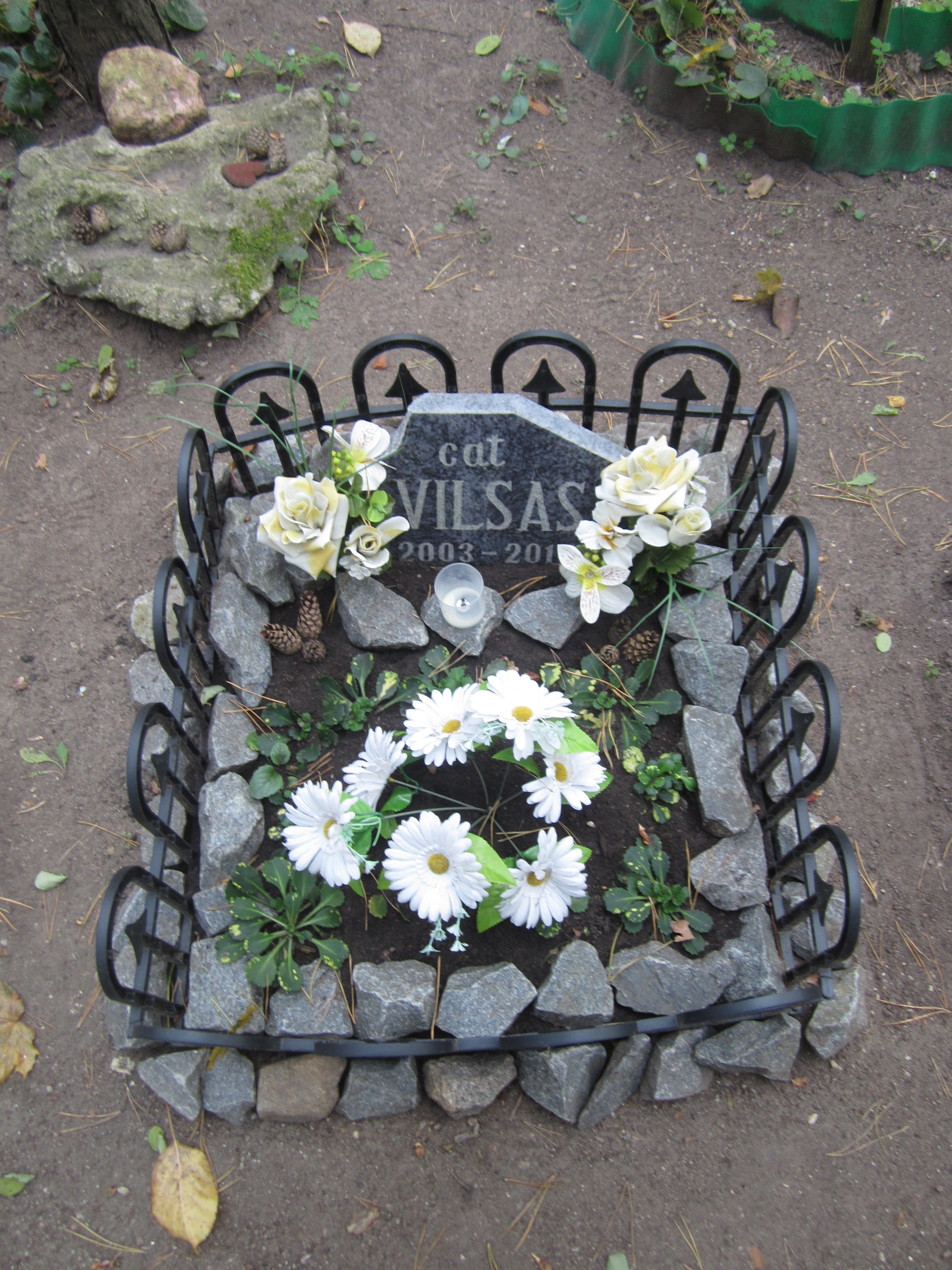
A cat's grave with a tombstone
