= Raišiai =

- Village
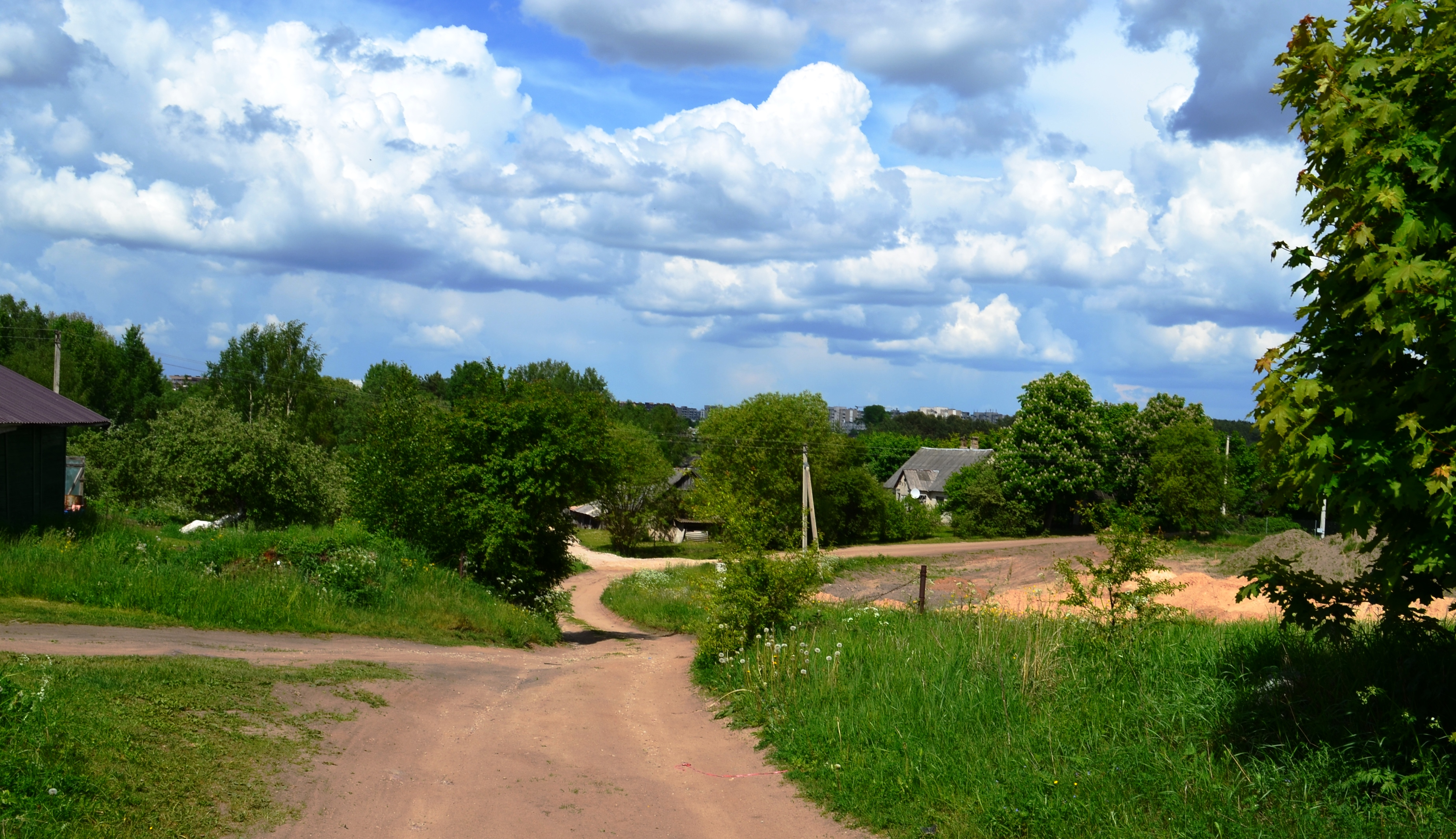
- Street in Raišiai

- Location of Raišiai
- Coordinates: 54°41′38″N 25°10′41″E
- Country: Lithuania
- County: Vilnius County
- Municipality: Vilnius District Municipality
- Eldership: Zujūnai Eldership

Population (2011)
  - Total: 11
- Time zone: UTC+2 (EET)
  - Summer (DST): UTC+3 (EEST)

Raišiai is a village in Vilnius District Municipality, Lithuania. According to the 2011 census, it had a population of 11. It is located on the southern coast of Salotė Lake, close to the Girulių Forest, and 1 kilometre (0.62 mi) from Pilaitė.

In 2021, a treasure was discovered in Raišiai with 40 Grand Duke Jogaila's coins (Denars), some of which had lions while others had horsemen wielding swords or spears, most of the coins were minted in 1377–1386 (prior to the crowning of Jogaila as the Polish King).
