= Saulius Skvernelis =

Prime Minister of Lithuania (2016–2020)

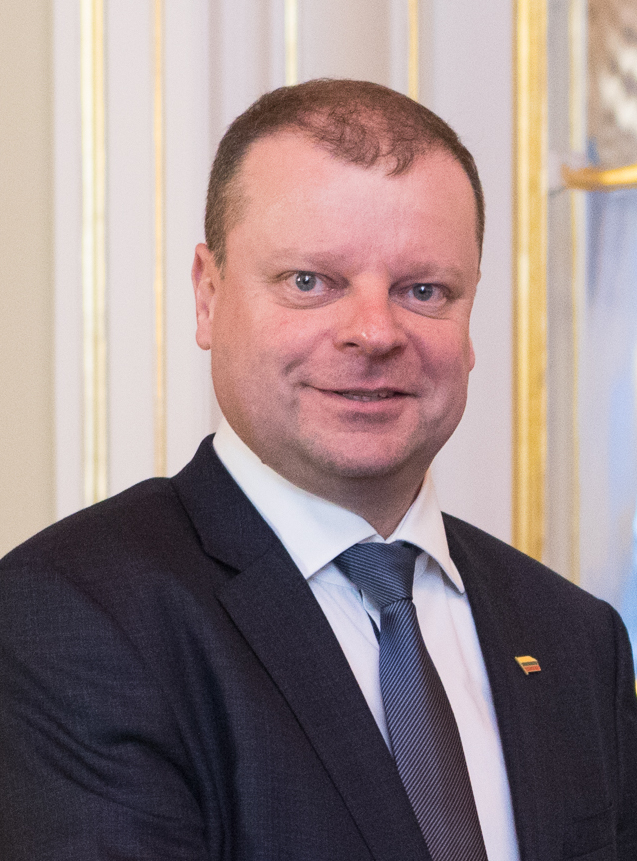
- Skvernelis in 2017

Speaker of the Seimas
- In office 14 November 2024 – 10 September 2025
- President: Gitanas Nausėda
- Preceded by: Viktorija Čmilytė-Nielsen
- Succeeded by: Juozas Olekas

Chairman of Union of Democrats "For Lithuania"
- In office 29 January 2022 – 10 April 2026
- Preceded by: Office established
- Succeeded by: Virginijus Sinkevičius

16th Prime Minister of Lithuania
- In office 13 December 2016 – 11 December 2020
- President: Dalia Grybauskaitė; Gitanas Nausėda
- Preceded by: Algirdas Butkevičius
- Succeeded by: Ingrida Šimonytė

Member of the Seimas
- Incumbent
- Assumed office 13 November 2020
- Constituency: Multi-member
- In office 14 November 2016 – 12 November 2020
- Preceded by: Linas Balsys
- Succeeded by: Radvilė Morkūnaitė-Mikulėnienė
- Constituency: Karoliniškės

Minister of the Interior
- In office 11 November 2014 – 13 April 2016
- Prime Minister: Algirdas Butkevičius
- Preceded by: Dailis Alfonsas Barakauskas
- Succeeded by: Tomas Žilinskas

Personal details
- Born: 23 July 1970 (age 56) Kaunas, then part of Lithuanian SSR, Soviet Union
- Party: Independent (2026-present)
- Other political affiliations: Order and Justice (2014–2016); LVŽS (2016–2022); DSVL (2022–2026)
- Spouse: Silvija Skvernelė
- Children: 2
- Education: Vilnius Gediminas Technical University

Saulius Skvernelis (born 23 July 1970) is a Lithuanian politician and activist who served as prime minister of Lithuania between 2016 and 2020. He had previously served as police commissioner, and was Minister of the Interior from 2014 to 2016. Though he was an independent politician, he was backed by the Lithuanian Farmers and Greens Union and was a member of its parliamentary group until 2022, as a result of which he became the first head of government in European history primarily backed by a green party (a green conservative party).

In 2022, he formed his own political party, the Union of Democrats "For Lithuania", and he is currently a member of the Seimas.

He was the Speaker of the Seimas from 14 November 2024 until 10 September 2025.

== Education and work ==
Born in Kaunas, Skvernelis graduated from the Vilnius Technical University in 1994 and started working at the Lithuania Police Academy.

In 1998, Skvernelis started his career in the Lithuanian law enforcement system, working as a traffic police inspector in Trakai District Municipality. Gradually rising through the ranks, he was appointed General Commissioner of Police of Lithuania on 7 March 2011.

In this position, he played a role in the Case of Drąsius Kedys. As General Commissioner, he approved the transfer of Kedys' daughter to her biological mother on 17 May 2012, in a police raid in which 240 police officers were involved and force was reportedly used against protestors attempting to stop the transfer. Skvernelis was reportedly threatened with dismissal by members of the incumbent government, but went ahead with the operation regardless.

== Political career ==
=== Minister of the Interior ===
Dailis Alfonsas Barakauskas, delegated by the Order and Justice party as Minister of the Interior, became complicit in a corruption scandal in late 2014 and chose to resign. Order and Justice tapped Skvernelis as his replacement, despite him not being a member of the party, and he accepted. On 5 November 2014, President Dalia Grybauskaitė appointed Skvernelis as Minister of the Interior, with the Seimas confirming the appointment on 11 November.

From the beginning of his term as Minister, Skvernelis enjoyed high approval ratings. However, he nearly resigned on 20 November 2015 after an incident in Vilnius, in which Igor Molotkov, a Russian-speaking inhabitant of Vilnius arrested by Lithuanian police, escaped out of a police vehicle with a stolen AK-47 and roamed the city for several hours until he was detained again. An action among members of the Seimas in support of him remaining in the post, initiated by Petras Gražulis, gathered the signatures of a majority of the parliament. Prime Minister Algirdas Butkevičius refused his resignation on 30 November.

During the 2015 European migrant crisis, Skvernelis criticised anti-migrant rhetoric, but also expressed scepticism towards the European Union's policy of migrant quotas. He conflicted with Speaker of the Seimas Loreta Graužinienė and President Grybauskaitė during his term.

=== 2016 parliamentary election and Skvernelis Cabinet ===
By 2016, Skvernelis had become one of the most popular politicians in Lithuania. As a result, he was approached by several political parties, including the Liberal Movement, the Social Democratic Party of Lithuania and Order and Justice, to join their party or participate in their electoral list in the 2016 parliamentary election. However, he refused their offers and announced he would participate in the electoral list of the Lithuanian Farmers and Greens Union, a party with only one seat in the outgoing parliament, in March 2016. As the Farmers and Greens were a part of the opposition, he was forced to resign as Minister of the Interior and was replaced by Tomas Žilinskas.

Although not a member of the party, Skvernelis headed the electoral list of the Farmers and Greens, leading them to a surprisingly large victory in the 2016 election. The party won 22.45% of votes in the nationwide constituency (finishing close second to the Homeland Union), but finished with 54 of the 141 seats in the Seimas, thanks to strong performances in single-member constituencies. Skvernelis was elected to the Seimas in the single-member constituency of Karoliniškės in Vilnius.

As the Farmers and Greens had never held the plurality of seats, a coalition with either the Homeland Union or the Social Democrats was considered. After a grand coalition was dismissed by party leaders, the right wing of the Homeland Union, represented by Žygimantas Pavilionis, Audronius Ažubalis, Paulius Saudargas, Agnė Bilotaitė and others, pressured Gabrielius Landsbergis to form a coalition with the party. However, the Farmers and Greens chose to form a coalition with the Social Democrats instead. In the subsequent coalition negotiations, it was agreed that Skvernelis would become the prime minister of Lithuania. He was appointed as prime minister by President Dalia Grybauskaitė on 22 November 2016, having been confirmed by the Seimas, and assumed the office on 13 December 2016, when the Seimas approved the program of the Skvernelis Cabinet.

==== Domestic policy ====
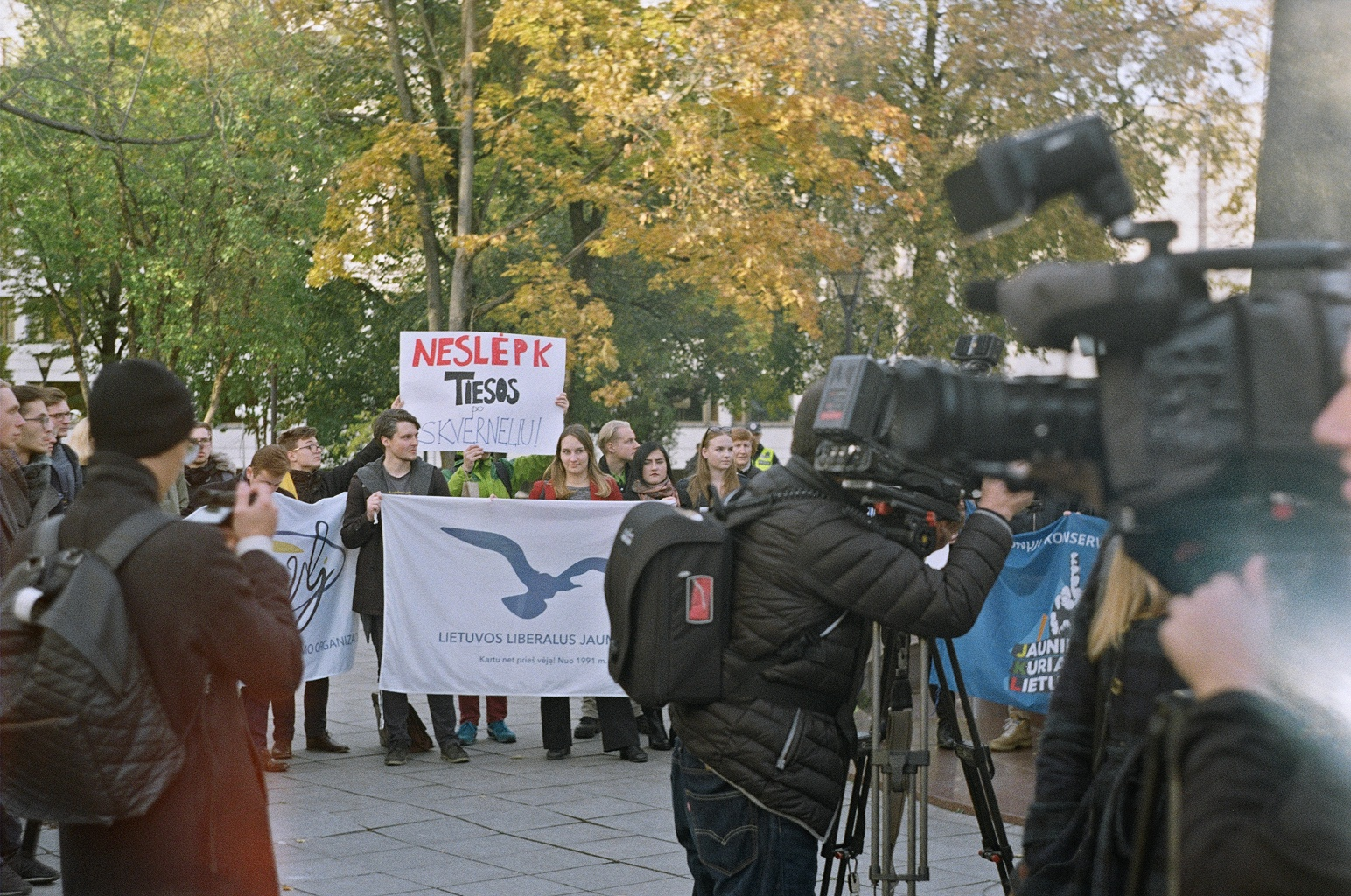
Protest against Skvernelis government

His premiership included creation of Child benefit, wage and pensions increase and income tax cuts. The Skvernelis Cabinet teacher pay reform led to the biggest teacher strike in Lithuania's history. His Government had also introduced measures that reduced freedom of the press. Skvernelis is considered a pragmatic politician (opportunist by his critics) who doesn't have a clear political ideology.

On 14 February 2018, appearing at an LGBT rally in Vilnius, Skvernelis called on the Seimas to recognise same-sex partnerships.

==== Coalition instability ====
As Algirdas Butkevičius chose to resign as chairman of the Social Democrats due to poor election results, a leadership election was held on 22 April 2017, and was won by Gintautas Paluckas, who questioned the benefit of the coalition agreement with the Farmers and Greens. Against the wishes of its parliamentary group, the party leadership voted to terminate the coalition agreement, but only five of the party's 17 members followed the party's decision. The remaining parliamentarians established the Social Democratic Labour Party in late 2017. A new coalition agreement was signed, but the cabinet was only left with 69 seats of 141 and became a minority government.

The cabinet regained its majority in 2019 - according to the Constitution of Lithuania, the incumbent government must be reaffirmed after a presidential election, and Skvernelis thus held negotiations with minor parties in the Seimas after the 2019 Lithuanian presidential election. The Electoral Action of Poles in Lithuania and the parliamentary group "For the Welfare of Lithuania" (Lithuanian: Frakcija „Lietuvos gerovei“), made up of former members of the Order and Justice party, joined the coalition.

However, Skvernelis only retained a majority for four months - on 13 January 2020, the "For the Welfare of Lithuania" parliamentary group disbanded, as it lost the minimum required number of seven members to continue existing. The defector, Kęstutis Bartkevičius, reportedly left due to being passed over for a minister position.

On 7 May 2020, the Christian Union (consisting of 2 former members of the Homeland Union) expressed their support to the government. The Constitution requires the coalition programme to be reapproved by the Seimas after the inclusion of a new coalition member, thus the Constitutional Court of Lithuania ruled that this action violated the Constitution. However, the ruling would not be officially announced until 23 December in order to allow the government to finish serving its term.

=== 2019 presidential campaign ===
On 17 January 2019, Skvernelis announced his candidacy for the presidency. In the first round of the presidential election he came third. After his poor showing Skvernelis announced that he would resign from position of prime minister, but later retracted his remarks.

=== Thirteenth Seimas (2020–2024) ===
In March 2021 the Lithuanian Farmers and Greens Union and the Labour Party signed a coalition agreement that gave the needed number of members of Seimas for the parties to appoint the opposition leader to the Seimas' Board. On 25 March 2021 Skvernelis was appointed to this position. He remained in this position until mid-September 2021.

In late 2021, Skvernelis left the Lithuanian Farmers and Greens Union (LVŽS) political group in Seimas and formed the political group Democrats "For Lithuania".

On 29 January 2022 he formed his own party, Union of Democrats "For Lithuania" (DSVL), and was elected its first chairman.

=== Fourteenth Seimas (2024–2028) ===
Prior to the 2024 Lithuanian parliamentary election, as the leader of the Union of Democrats "For Lithuania" (DSVL), Skvernelis had stated that he wished to avoid forming a coalition with the Lithuanian Farmers and Greens Union (LVŽS) to which he had previously belonged. He called Ramūnas Karbauskis, the leader of LVŽS, an "oligarch" and criticized his choice not to run as a candidate in the election.

In the election, Skvernelis led the Union of Democrats to a fourth-place finish, with his party securing 14 out of 141 total seats in the Fourteenth Seimas. Skvernelis himself ran in the single-seat constituency of Lazdynai, where he lost in the run-off to then-Defence Minister Laurynas Kasčiūnas of the Homeland Union. Skvernelis nonetheless secured a seat in the multi-mandate constituency due to his position in the party list.

Following the first round of the election, the victorious Lithuanian Social Democratic Party (LSDP) invited DSVL and LVŽS to start coalition talks. However, numerous disagreements persisted between the LVŽS and DSVL parties, with each proposing various restrictions for a potential coalition, and Karbauskis calling Skvernelis a "traitor" but still expressing some openness to working together. Following the second round of the election, instead of LVŽS, the LSDP and DSVL signed a coalition agreement with Dawn of Nemunas. This coalition deal led to international criticism from politicians in the United States, Germany, and Israel due to allegedly antisemitic statements made by the founder of Dawn of Nemunas.

Skvernelis was elected the Speaker of the Seimas on 14 November 2024, with 107 votes in favour and 19 against.

On the morning of 9 February 2026, law enforcement officers, including the Special Investigation Service, searched the Seimas offices and homes of Seimas members Skvernelis and Kazys Starkevičius. The searches were related suspected corruption at the State Plant Breeding Service, during which gold, cash, explosives, and cocaine were found.

On 9 April 2026, the Prosecutor General's Office asked the Seimas to lift his legal immunity. The prosecutor's office informed that it has information about possible political bribery.

After the prosecutor's office's statement, Skvernelis suspended his membership in the Union of Democrats "For Lithuania" and resigned from the position of party chairman. He decided not to resign from the Seimas.

On April 16, 2026, the Seimas lifted his legal immunity. Speaking before the vote, the politician urged everyone to vote for the removal of immunity. 102 members of the Seimas voted for its abolition, 1 against, and 2 abstained.

On 24 April 2026, Skvernelis was formally charged by the Prosecutor General's Office with bribery in connection with criminal activities at the Plant Breeding Service. It is alleged that while holding the position of Speaker of the Seimas, he accepted at least 51 thousand euros in cash bribes on several occasions. It is suspected that they were used to secure his political favor in the exercise of his powers related to the activities of the Plant Breeding Service.

== Honours ==
=== Foreign honours ===
- Poland: Grand Cross of the Order of Merit of the Republic of Poland (15 July 2019)

Seimas
Preceded by Linas Balsys	Member of the Seimas for Karoliniškės; 2016–2020	Succeeded by Radvilė Morkūnaitė-Mikulėnienė
Political offices
Preceded by Dailis Alfonsas Barakauskas	Minister of the Interior; 2014–2016	Succeeded by Tomas Žilinskas
Preceded by Algirdas Butkevičius	Prime Minister of Lithuania; 2016–2020	Succeeded by Ingrida Šimonytė
