= National Alliance (Lithuania) =

National Alliance Nacionalinis susivienijimas
- Abbreviation: NS
- Chairman: Vytautas Sinica
- Deputy Chairmen: Marius Parčiauskas
- Deputy Chairmen: Dominykas Vanhara
- Founded: 7 March 2020
- Headquarters: Kalvarijų g. 280-37, Vilnius
- Youth wing: Pro Patria
- Membership: 2,005 (2023)
- Ideology: Nationalism; Right-wing populism Christian nationalism
- Political position: Right-wing to far-right
- Colours: Red
- Slogan: Raise your head, Lithuanian!
- Seimas: 1 / 141
- European Parliament: 0 / 11
- Municipal councils: 3 / 1,461
- Mayors: 0 / 60

Website
- susivienijimas.lt

The National Alliance (Lithuanian: Nacionalinis susivienijimas, NS) is a Lithuanian far-right political party founded on 7 March 2020 and led by Vytautas Sinica. As of 2024, the party holds two municipal council seats and one seat in Seimas, being represented by its chairman Vytautas Sinica.

== History ==
=== Origins, foundation and the first years (2016–2022) ===
The predecessor to the party was the Vilnius Forum, later the National Forum, a right-wing political movement which criticized globalization, liberalism and LGBT rights, founded in 2016. The founder of the Forum was Vytautas Radžvilas, a political philosopher, professor and former activist of the Sąjūdis during the Singing Revolution, known for his criticism of liberalism and multiple citizenship, as well as Eurosceptic views. During this period, he gained notoriety for a conflict with the administration of Vilnius University, and he claimed he was removed from lecturing in the university's politics and international relations institute because of his right-wing views.

In 2019, Radžvilas established the public election committee "Vytautas Radžvilas: Recover the State!" (Lithuanian: Vytautas Radžvilas: susigrąžinkime valstybę!) to participate in the 2019 European Parliament election in Lithuania. Though he claimed that the European Parliament is powerless, he likened it to the Congress of the People's Deputies in the last years of the Soviet Union, and that it will determine the future of the organization. The committee received 3.35 percent of the votes and did not win any seats.

After the election, the movement considered unification with 2019 presidential candidate Arvydas Juozaitis and the Christian Union, but it failed due to personal conflict and a separate National Alliance was founded on 7 March 2020. It received 2.21 percent of the vote in the 2020 parliamentary election, and received no seats in the Seimas.

The party adopted a slogan "Raise your head, Lithuanian!". It echoes the title of a 1933 pamphlet by Jonas Noreika, a controversial figure falsely accused of collaborating with Nazi authorities during the Holocaust in Lithuania.

Most of the party's votes came from Vilnius. According to political scientist Matas Baltrukevičius, it represents the same electorate as the Lithuanian List, a short-lived anti-establishment party which was founded in 2012 and represented in the municipal council of Vilnius from 2015 to 2019.

=== Gaining representation at municipal and national levels (since 2023) ===
In the 2023 municipal elections, it won three seats on the municipal council of Vilnius City Municipality, its most successful election result. One of the party's councillors, Aleksandras Nemunaitis, was expelled in April 2023, as he joined the effort to nominate Artūras Zuokas as leader of the opposition in the Vilnius municipal council, even though the party opposed this move.

In the 2024 Lithuanian parliamentary election, the party gained representation, when party's deputy leader Vytautas Sinica won a single member constituency in Vilnius.

==== Infighting (2025) ====
A leadership conflict within National Alliance erupted in 2025 between party founder Vytautas Radžvilas and Seimas member Vytautas Sinica. In August, the party board expelled Sinica, accusing him of violating party statutes by organizing unauthorized meetings, attempting to convene an extraordinary congress, and acting independently in political campaigns, including protests against the Belarusian opposition office linked to Sviatlana Tsikhanouskaya. Sinica rejected the expulsion as illegitimate and accused the party leadership of internal factionalism and efforts to sideline him.

The conflict escalated in September 2025 when Sinica and his supporters held an extraordinary party congress that elected him chairman of National Alliance. Radžvilas and the existing leadership refused to recognize the congress, alleging financial misconduct within Sinica's faction and announcing legal action over the legitimacy of the gathering. In October 2025, Lithuania's Ministry of Justice formally recognized the congress results and registered Sinica as party chairman, effectively transferring formal control of the party to his faction despite ongoing legal and political disputes.

== Program and ideology ==
The National Alliance is generally described as a far-right party. It claims to be an all-national movement that seeks to restore the ideas of Sąjūdis, the national movement which was responsible for the restoration of Lithuania's independence in 1990. The party is described as nationalist, with a dream to make "Lithuania forever Lithuanian."

It claims to represent a nationalist, socially conservative, Christian worldview, opposes European integration and legalization of multiple citizenship, and demands lustration of all former informants of the KGB. The party's primary objective is opposition to the national strategy of "Global Lithuania", which seeks to maintain the Lithuanian diaspora as an integral part of a "global" Lithuanian state, and demands a strategy towards limiting emigration and encouraging emigrant return. It is also opposed to LGBT rights and states that its purpose is to defend Christianity in Lithuania and the Lithuanian ethnicity from extinction.

Economically, the party holds certain populist, interventionist and paternalist views, such as instituting progressive taxation, creation of commercial state bank, strengthening the social safety net and increasing funding for the education system, although it also seeks to "destroy the mentality of dependency" and cut benefits for certain social groups, such as alcoholics, unemployed persons and single mothers whose children's father's identity is unknown.

Party is soft eurosceptic. It does not seek Lithuania's withdrawal from the European Union, but opposes further integration and demands more powers to be returned to the organization's member states. It also demands that the European Union formally recognize its Christian heritage.

== Election results ==
=== Seimas ===
Election	Leader	Votes (Note: Proportional representation votes.)	%	Seats	+/–	Government
2020	Vytautas Radžvilas	25,092	2.21 (#10)	0 / 141	New	Extra-parliamentary
2024	Vytautas Radžvilas	35,630	2.87 (#9)	1 / 141	▲1	Opposition

=== European Parliament ===
Election	List leader	Votes	%	Seats	+/–	EP Group
2019 (Note: As the Public Election Committee "Vytautas Radžvilas: Recover the State!")	Vytautas Radžvilas	41,860	3.35 (#10)	0 / 11	New	–
2024	Vytautas Radžvilas	25,688	3.79 (#11)	0 / 11	0	–

=== Municipal ===
Election	Votes (Note: Municipal council election votes.)	%	Council seats	Mayors	+/–
2023	13,140	1.12 (#12)	3 / 1,498	0 / 60	-
