= Centre of Trade Unions (political party) =

Centre of Trade Unions Profesinių sąjungų centras
- Leader: Kęstutis Juknis
- Founded: May 24, 2008
- Headquarters: Laisvės al. 46, Kaunas
- Membership: 2,233 members (2024)
- Ideology: Trade union interests
- Political position: Left-wing
- Seimas: 0 / 141
- European Parliament: 0 / 11
- Municipal councils and mayors: 0 / 1,558

The Political Party "Centre of Trade Unions" (Lithuanian: Politinė partija "Profesinių sąjungų centras") is a minor political party in Lithuania founded in 2008. It was founded by the initiative of the trade union Sandrauga. The party has not achieved success in elections in Lithuania and cooperates with right-wing parties.

== History ==
The party was founded with 1260 signatures in 2008. It elected Kęstutis Juknis, chairman of the Sandrauga trade union, as its leader. The country's three national trade union centers - the Lithuanian Trade Union Confederation, the Lithuanian Labour Federation and Solidarity - distanced themselves from the party, claiming that it collates trade union activity with political party activity.

The party was mainly active in Kaunas and participated in municipal elections in Kaunas and Kaunas District Municipality in 2011 and 2015. It did not win a single mandate.

In 2016, it joined Naglis Puteikis, 2014 presidential election candidate and former Homeland Union member of the Seimas, and journalist Kristupas Krivickas in the "Anti-Corruption Coalition" (Lithuanian: Antikorupcinė N. Puteikio ir K. Krivicko koalicija). A wide coalition of anti-establishment parties, it was also joined by the Lithuanian Centre Party, the Lithuanian Pensioners' Party, the Lithuanian Christian Democracy Party, and former National Resurrection Party member Ligitas Kernagis. Though the coalition received 6.32% of the vote, it did not reach the 7% threshold required for multi-party coalitions and did not win proportional seats.

The party ran candidates on the list of the People and Justice Union in the 2024 European Parliament election in Lithuania.

== Platform ==
The party claims that its goal is to defend the interests of trade unions and the working class.
