= Vytautas Radžvilas =

Lithuanian philosopher and politician

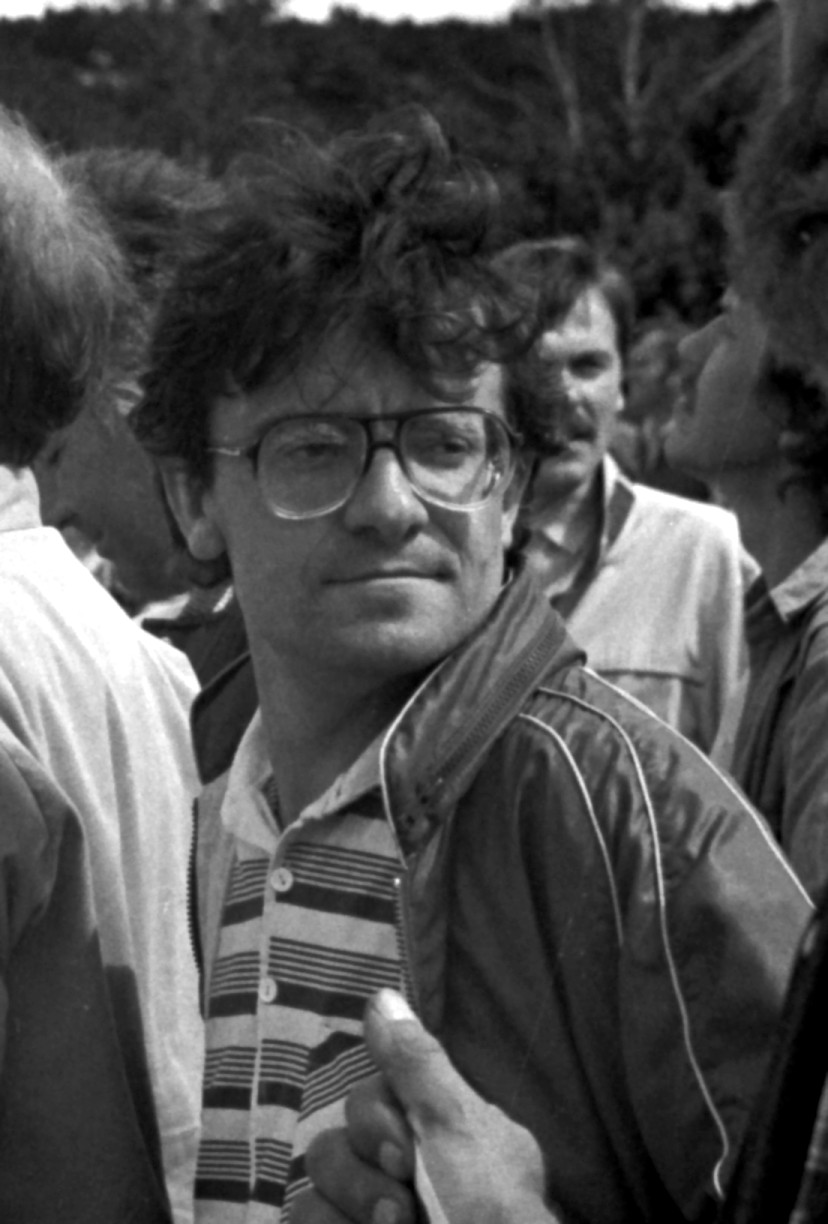
- Radžvilas in 1989

Chairman of the National Alliance
- Incumbent
- Assumed office 7 March 2020

Personal details
- Born: 25 January 1958 (age 68) Vismantai, Pakruojis District Municipality, Lithuania
- Party: National Alliance (2020–present)
- Other political affiliations: Liberal Union of Lithuania (1990-1993)
- Spouse: Aldona
- Education: Vilnius University (PhD)

Vytautas Radžvilas (born 25 January 1958) is a Lithuanian philosopher, activist and politician. He was a member of the initiative group of Sąjūdis in 1988 and established the Liberal Union of Lithuania as an alternative to the Sąjūdis in 1990. In 2020, he founded the right-wing National Alliance and was elected its chairman.

== Biography ==
=== Background ===
Radžvilas was born in the village of Vismantai, in Pakruojis District Municipality, in 1958. He graduated from Vilnius University with a degree in psychology in 1980. From 1980, he was a trainee at the Department of History of Philosophy and Logic at Vilnius University, a postgraduate from 1981 to 1984, and a lecturer at the Department of Philosophy from 1984 to 1989. In 1987, he became a Candidate of Philosophy at the university and defended a dissertation on "The Philosophy of the History of French Personalism". His supervisor was Bronislovas Genzelis, later a signatory of the Act of the Re-Establishment of the State of Lithuania in 1990.

=== Pro-independence activism and early political career ===
Radžvilas participated in the founding conference of Sąjūdis organized by members of Lithuanian civil society, arts and sciences at the Lithuanian Academy of Sciences on 3 June 1988. Alongside 34 other members, he was elected to the Sąjūdis Initiative Group (Lithuanian: Sąjūdžio iniciatyvinė grupė), which was tasked to organize and establish the movement.

Radžvilas later described the history of Sąjūdis negatively and claimed that "after the second congress, people who had been in the background, loyal to the system in all respects, began to move in en masse" and that the later organization, according to him, betrayed the initial patriotic and democratic ideals of the Initiative Group. Vytautas Landsbergis, one of the founders of Sąjūdis and the de facto head of state of Lithuania from 1990 to 1992, claimed in 2023 that Radžvilas was a KGB informant, which Radžvilas denied.

Radžvilas did not participate in the 1990 Lithuanian Supreme Soviet election and did not become a signatory of the Act of the Re-Establishment of the State of Lithuania on 11 March 1990. In June, from a liberal discussion club active in Vilnius University, a founding group for the Liberal Union of Lithuania was established and Radžvilas was elected as its chairman. In 2018, he claimed that the establishment of the party was necessitated by a purge of Sąjūdis ranks organized by Landsbergis, during which politicians opposed to his views were pushed out of the organization.

Radžvilas resigned from leadership after the party's defeat in the 1992 Lithuanian parliamentary election, during which it received 1.5% of the votes and won no seats. The party reoriented itself towards free market economics and business interests, and Radžvilas left the party. Later, he claimed that the party was couped by business representatives, especially the fraudulent business group EBSW, and abandoned its original intentions.

=== Later career ===
After the restoration of the independence of Lithuania and the end of his political career, Radžvilas continued with his academic career. He was the head of the Department of Philosophy and History of Culture of the Vilnius Academy of Arts from 1989 to 1999, and a lecturer at the Institute of International Relations and Political Science of Vilnius University from 2000 to 2018. In 2000, he was selected as a member of the Higher Education Council (Lithuanian: Aukštojo mokslo taryba), an expert body on the development of higher education in Lithuania. He was also the chairman of the think tank Democratic Policy Institute from 2003 to 2006.

Radžvilas is the author of translations of numerous philosophical and scientific articles into Lithuanian, and has published books on history, political philosophy and Lithuanian nationalism. He was the founder of the Vilnius Forum, later the National Forum, a right-wing organization which criticized globalization, liberalism and LGBT rights, in 2016.

In 2017, the director of the Institute of International Relations and Political Science, Ramūnas Vilpišauskas received a student petition requesting that Radžvilas's course "History of the Idea of Europe" be downgraded from a mandatory to an optional course. The petition claimed that Radžvilas' course had little to do with Europe studies and was used as a platform for the professor's eurosceptic views, including comparing the European Union to the Soviet Union and describing it as a failed project. The public conflict between Radžvilas, students supporting Radžvilas, and students opposed to Radžvilas and institute administration was dubbed Radžvilias (Lithuanian: "Radžviliada"), a reference to the 16th century epic poem Radivilias.

Radžvilas' employment contract with the institute expired in August 2018 and was not renewed.

=== Return to politics ===
In 2019, Radžvilas established the public election committee "Vytautas Radžvilas: Recover the State!" (Lithuanian: Vytautas Radžvilas: susigrąžinkime valstybę!) to participate in the 2019 European Parliament election in Lithuania. Though he claimed that the European Parliament is powerless, he likened it to the Congress of the People's Deputies in the last years of the Soviet Union, and that it will determine the future of the organization. The committee received 3.35 percent of the votes and did not win any seats.

After the election, Radžvilas founded the National Alliance, with the committee's members forming the core of the party. Many of the party's leading members and candidates were former members of Sąjūdis or members of the right-wing youth organization Pro Patria, including his own students and defenders during Radžvilias. In 2023, the party elected three deputies to the municipal council of Vilnius City Municipality.

Radžvilas initiated protests to defend Kazys Škirpa, leader of the Lithuanian Activist Front in 1941.
