= Arvydas Juozaitis =

Lithuanian politician and swimmer (born 1956)

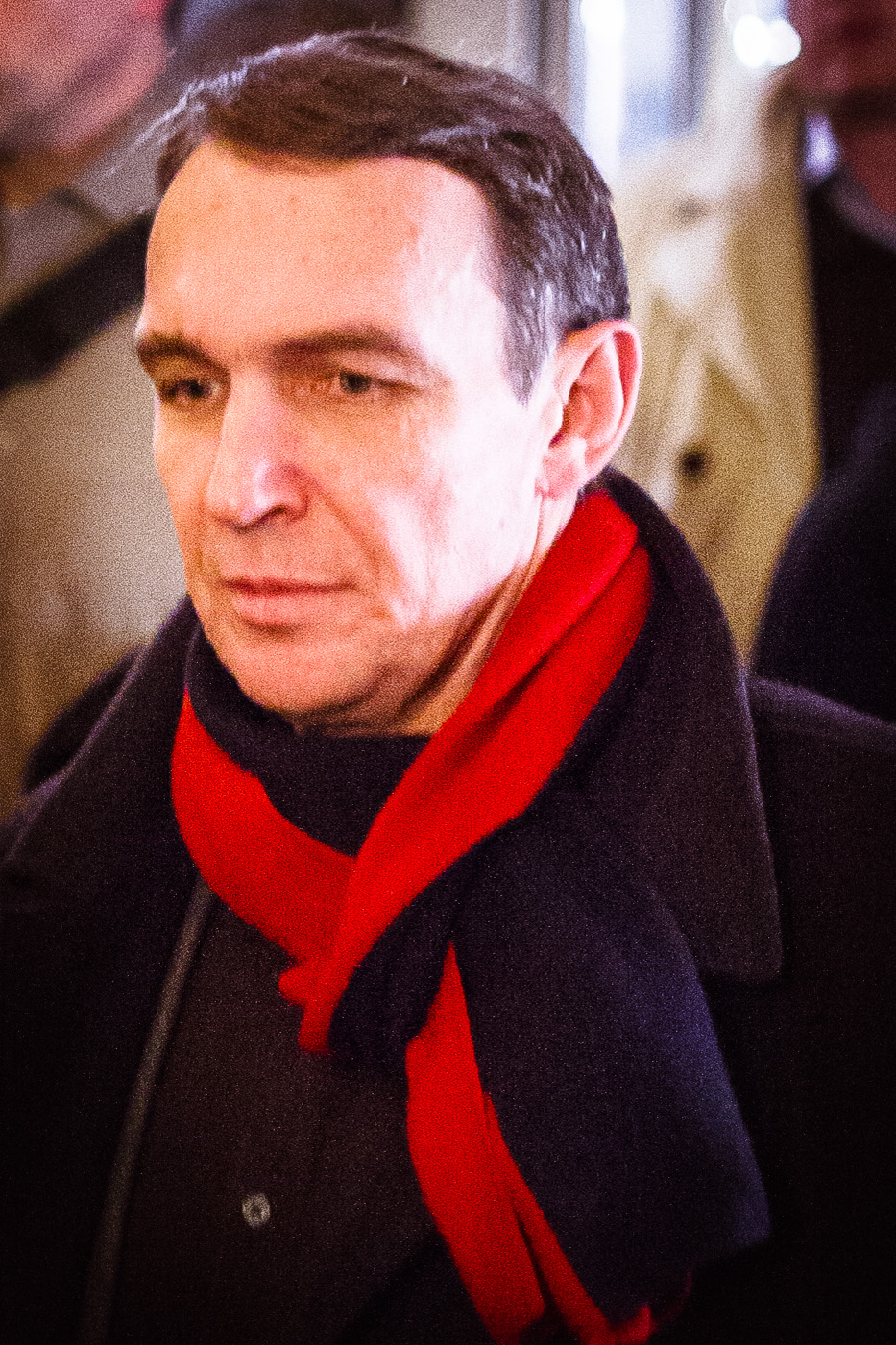
- Born: 18 April 1956; Vilnius, Lithuanian SSR, Soviet Union
- Education: Vilnius University
- Political party: Independent (before 2020); Union of Intergenerational Solidarity - Cohesion for Lithuania (2020-present)
- Spouse(s): Oksana Juozaitienė, Laima Balsevičiūtė
- Children: Vygaudas, Aldona, Uljana, Gediminas

Olympic medal record

Men's Swimming

Representing the Soviet Union
Bronze medal – third place	1976 Montreal	100 m breaststroke

Arvydas Juozaitis (born 18 April 1956 in Vilnius) is a Lithuanian writer, philosopher, politician, cultural worker and former swimmer who came in last the 100m breaststroke at the 1976 Summer Olympics. In 1988, he was a member of the Sąjūdis Initiative Group. He was registered as a candidate for 2019 Lithuanian presidential election.

== Political positions ==
Juozaitis is opposed to European integration and proposes a "Europe of nations", but supports NATO. He opposes dual citizenship. Answering questions on important political topics sent to presidential candidates by the program "Mano Balsas" (Lithuanian: My Voice), organized by the Vilnius University Institute of International Relations and Political Science, Juozaitis assumes interventionist positions on the economy, in favor of progressive taxation and publicly funded healthcare, but also described homosexuality as a "social experiment" and a "fad".

Juozaitis supports strengthening Lithuania's ties with Latvia and teaching the Latvian language in Lithuanian schools, and formation of a Lithuanian-Latvian confederation. He also supported a Lithuanian partnership with the Law and Justice government in Poland against the European Union.
