= Pilaitė =

- Eldership
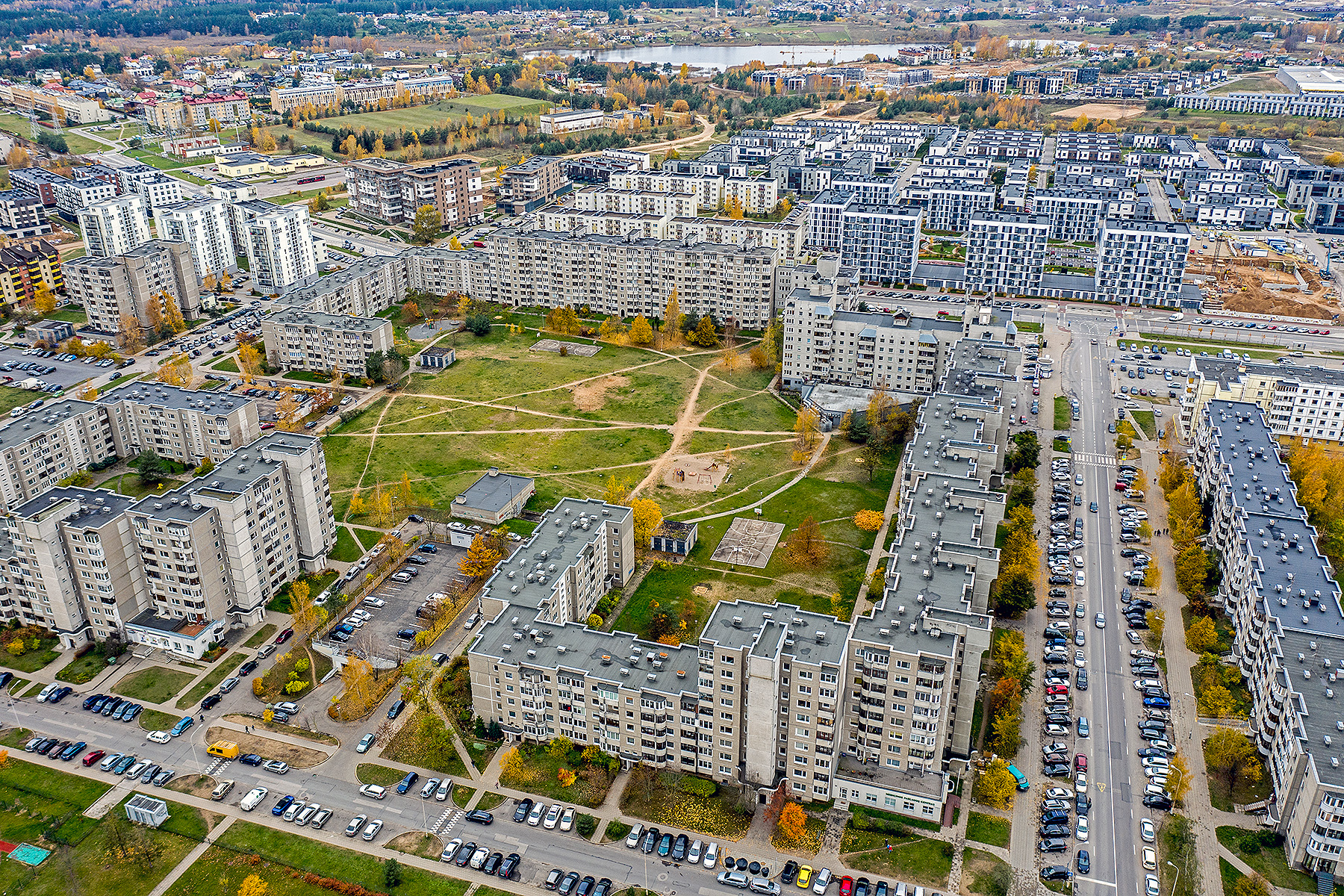

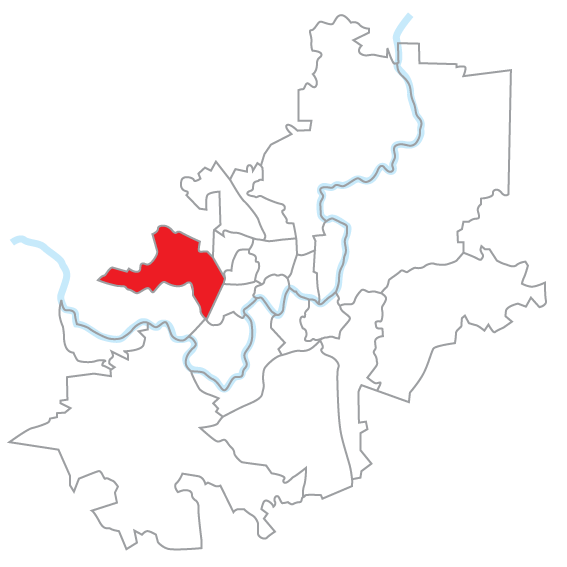

- Location of Pilaitė
- Country: Lithuania
- County: Vilnius County
- Municipality: Vilnius City Municipality
- Elder: Albinas Šniras

Area
  - Total: 13.92 km^{2} (5.37 sq mi)
  - Rank: 7th in (Vilnius)

Population (2023 December)
  - Total: 32,152
  - Density: 2,309.77/km^{2} (5,982.3/sq mi)
- Time zone: UTC+2 (EET)
  - Summer (DST): UTC+3 (EEST)
- Website: vilnius.lt

Pilaitė is an eldership in Vilnius, Lithuania. It occupies 13.92 km^{2} (5.37 sq mi). According to the 2011 census, it had a population of 20,320. Although being one of the newest elderships in Vilnius, with many buildings under construction, Pilaitė used to be a place with a medieval castle, rebuilt in Renaissance style in the 16th century, which guarded roads to the capital of the Grand Duchy of Lithuania from the West. The castle was destroyed during the Battle of Vilnius and was never rebuilt, but the place retained its name. It is mainly known to Vilnius residents by the two lakes it borders - Salotė and Gėlužis. Pilaitė is also known for its old windmill, which is not far away from Salotė Lake. It is known that there used to be a farm near that windmill, with some of the stone structures still standing.

== Demographics ==
The district is one of the fastest-growing in the entire city. It is estimated that in the last 20 years, the population of the district has increased by more than 101 percent. In 2001, the population of Little Castle was 15,996, with an increase to 20,320 in 2011 and 28,234 in 2021.

As of 2023, Pilaitė is predominantly populated by Lithuanians, Belarusians, Russians, and Ukrainians, where Lithuanians making 6/7 of the entire population.

Population of Pilaitė Eldership as of 2023
Rank	Nationality	Population	
1.	Lithuania	28,821	89.64%
2.	Belarus	1,155	3.59%
3.	Russia	976	3.04%
4.	Ukraine	401	1.25%
5.	United Kingdom	122	0.38%
6.	Others	677	2.10%
