= 2019 Lithuanian presidential election =

- 12 May 2019 (first round); 26 May 2019 (second round)
- Turnout: 57.37% (first round); 53.88% (second round)
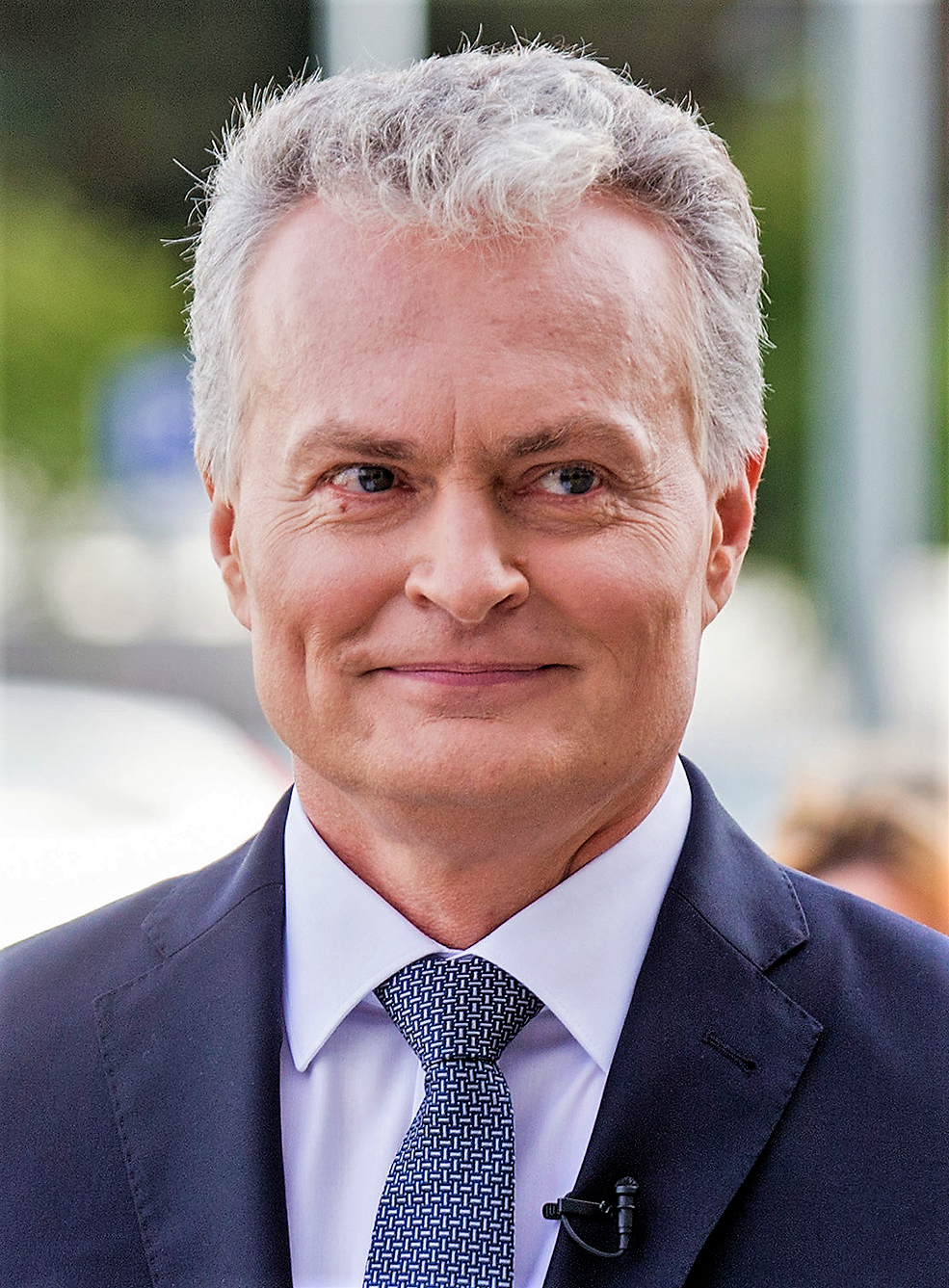

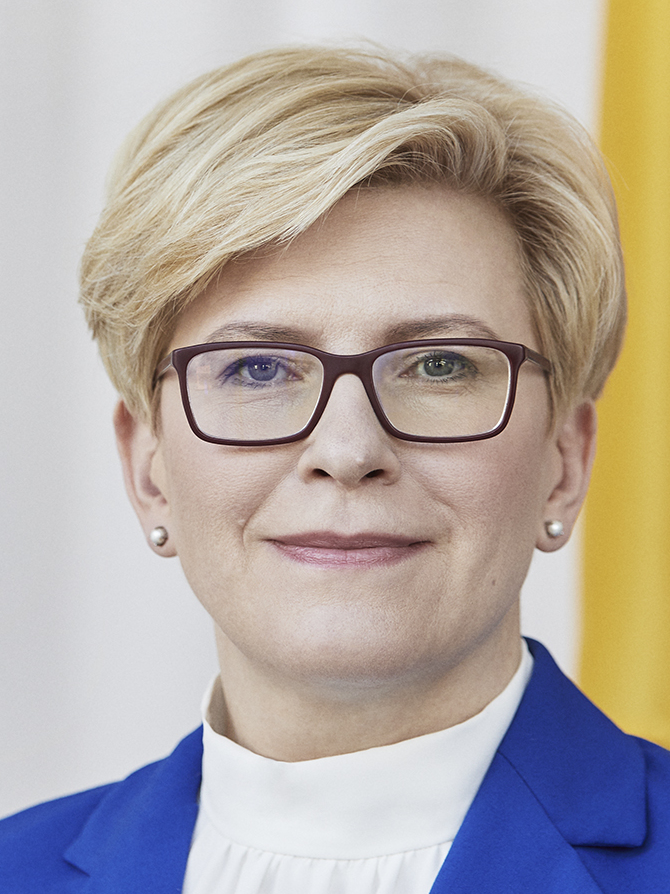
Nominee	Gitanas Nausėda	Ingrida Šimonytė
Party	Independent	Independent (TS–LKD)
Popular vote	881,495	443,394
Percentage	66.53%	33.47%
- First round results by municipality Nausėda: 30–45% 45%+ Šimonytė: 30–35% 35-40% 40–45% Skvernelis: 30–45% Tomaševski: 30–35% 45%+%
President before election
Dalia Grybauskaitė
Independent
Elected President
Gitanas Nausėda
Independent

Presidential elections were held in Lithuania on 12 May 2019, with a second round held on 26 May 2019. Due to a constitutional limit of two terms in office, incumbent president Dalia Grybauskaitė was unable to run, having won the 2009 and 2014 elections.

As no candidate obtained 50% of the vote in the first round, a second round was held between the top two candidates, Ingrida Šimonytė and Gitanas Nausėda. Nausėda was elected with 67% of the vote and was inaugurated as President of Lithuania on 12 July.

== Electoral system ==
The elections were held using the two-round system. To win in the first round, a candidate required an absolute majority of the vote and either voter turnout to be above 50% or for their vote share to be equivalent to at least one-third of the number of registered voters. If no candidate wins in the first round, a second round is required, featuring the top two candidates.

== Candidates ==
=== Approved candidates ===
- Naglis Puteikis, MP, Chairman of the Lithuanian Centre Party.
- Valentinas Mazuronis, MEP, former Minister of Environment. Independent.
- Gitanas Nausėda, economist, lecturer. Independent.
- Arvydas Juozaitis, philosopher, former Olympic athlete. Independent.
- Ingrida Šimonytė, MP, former deputy chairwoman of the Board of the Bank of Lithuania (2013–2016), former Minister of Finance (2009–2012). Independent, nominated by the Homeland Union.
- Vytenis Andriukaitis, Lithuania's European Commissioner, former Minister of Health (2012–2014), and a co-signatory to the 1990 Act of the Re-Establishment of the State of Lithuania. Nominated by the Social Democratic Party of Lithuania.
- Saulius Skvernelis, Prime Minister since 2016, former Minister of Interior (2014–2016) Independent, nominated by the Lithuanian Farmers and Greens Union and the Social Democratic Labour Party of Lithuania.
- Mindaugas Puidokas, MP. Independent.
- Valdemar Tomaševski, MEP, Chairman of Electoral Action of Poles in Lithuania.

=== Declined candidates ===
- Žygimantas Pavilionis, MP, former Ambassador of Lithuania to the United States
- Vygaudas Ušackas, former EU Ambassador to Russia. Lost TS-LKD primaries.
- Aušra Maldeikienė, MP
- Visvaldas Matijošaitis, Mayor of Kaunas
- Vitas Gudiškis, former President of Ice Hockey Federation of Lithuania
- Petras Auštrevičius, MEP
- Alfonsas Butė, Deputy Chairman of the Party of Christian Democracy of Lithuania.
- Kazimieras Juraitis,
- Petras Gražulis, MP

== Opinion polls ==
=== First round ===
Date	Vytenis Andriukaitis	Arvydas Juozaitis	Valentinas Mazuronis	Gitanas Nausėda	Mindaugas Puidokas	Naglis Puteikis	Ingrida Šimonytė	Saulius Skvernelis	Valdemar Tomaševski	Other	Don't Know	Will Not Vote
May 2019	5.5%	4.8%	1.2%	24.6%	1.9%	1.5%	26.2%	16.6%	1.8%	0.4%	6.9%	8.6%
April 2019	4.2%	5%	0.6%	27.9%	0.7%	2.3%	24.8%	14.5%	1.9%	0.2%	8.4%	9.2%
March 2019	4.7%	3.6%	–	23.5%	0.4%	–	22%	18.4%	1.7%	1.1%	9.8%	7.4%
February 2019	2.8%	4.5%	–	27.3%	–	2.1%	20%	16%	–	–	–	–
November 2018	–	4.7%	–	24.6%	–	2.4%	19.7%	13.2%	–	–	–	–
October 2018	–	–	–	23%	–	2.4%	17.5%	12.8%	–	–	–	–
September 2018	0.3%	3.3%	0.3%	19.7%	–	1.4%	8.0%	16.6%	–	–	13.9%	–
May 2018	1.6%	–	1.6%	22.9%	–	2.7%	5.3%	12.8%	–	–	10.2%	11.9%
16-24 November 2017	–	–	–	12%	–	–	7%	12.2%	–	–	32.6%	–

== Results ==
The first round was narrowly won by former Finance Minister Ingrida Šimonytė, with economist Gitanas Nausėda finishing second. As neither candidate passed the threshold of 50% of votes cast, a run-off was held between Šimonytė and Nausėda on 26 May. Nausėda won the second round with over 66% of the vote.

After finishing a distant third, Prime Minister Saulius Skvernelis announced his intention to resign on election night, with his resignation coming into effect on 12 July. Later, it was revealed that Skvernelis will continue his tenure as the Prime Minister until the next election of the Parliament.

Candidate	Party	First round		Second round	
Candidate	Party	Votes	%	Votes	%
Ingrida Šimonytė	Independent (Note: Supported by the Homeland Union)	446,719	31.53	443,394	33.47
Gitanas Nausėda	Independent	441,396	31.16	881,495	66.53
Saulius Skvernelis	Independent (Note: Supported by the Lithuanian Farmers and Greens Union)	279,413	19.72		
Vytenis Andriukaitis	Social Democratic Party of Lithuania	68,118	4.81		
Arvydas Juozaitis	Independent	66,957	4.73		
Valdemar Tomaševski	Electoral Action of Poles in Lithuania	56,476	3.99		
Mindaugas Puidokas	Independent	37,036	2.61		
Naglis Puteikis	Lithuanian Centre Party	11,302	0.80		
Valentinas Mazuronis	Independent	9,205	0.65		
Total		1,416,622	100.00	1,324,889	100.00
Valid votes		1,416,622	99.29	1,324,889	98.72
Invalid/blank votes		10,072	0.71	17,205	1.28
Total votes		1,426,694	100.00	1,342,094	100.00
Registered voters/turnout		2,486,915	57.37	2,491,021	53.88
Source: VRK, VRK
