= Karoliniškės =

- Eldership
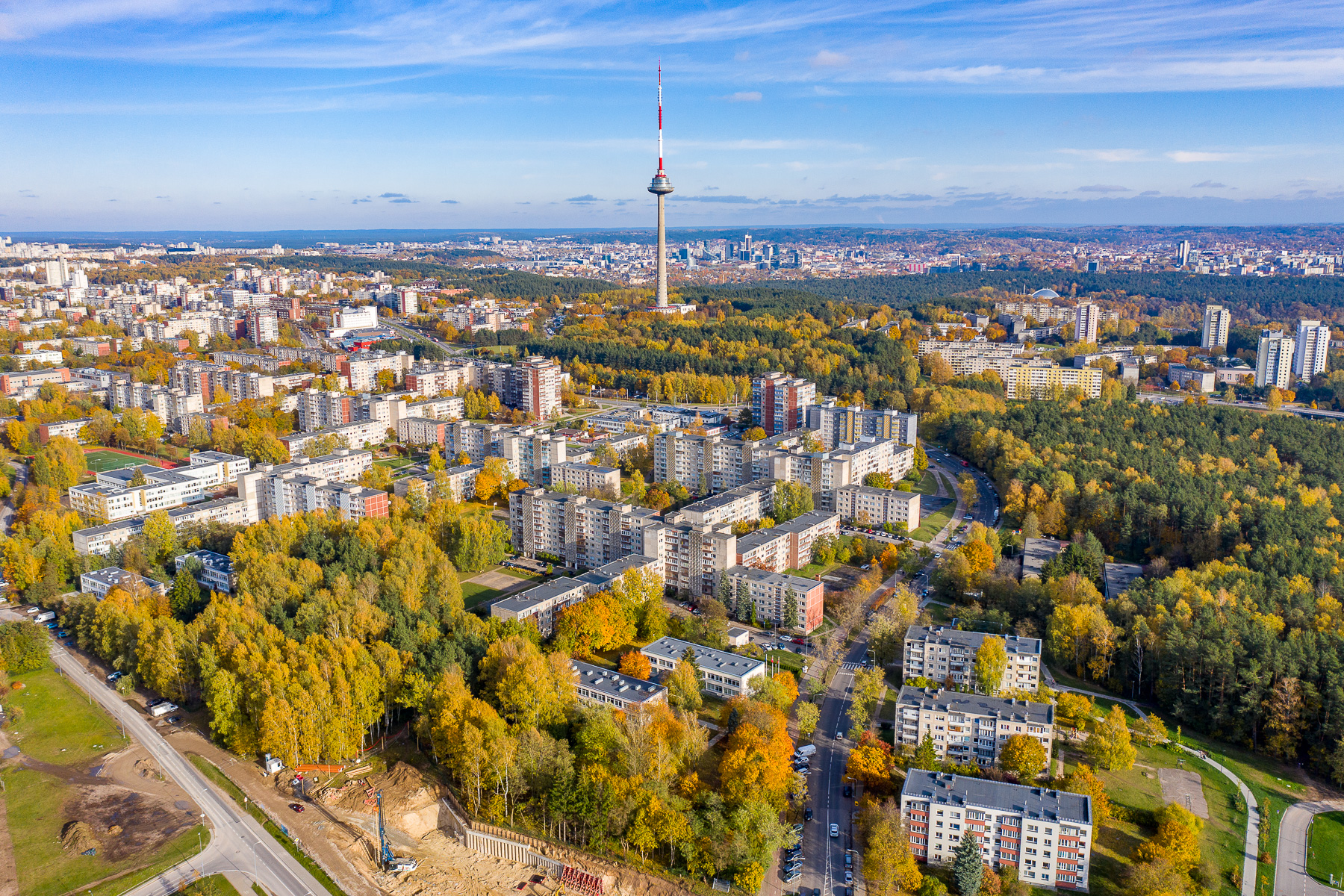
- View of Karoliniškės

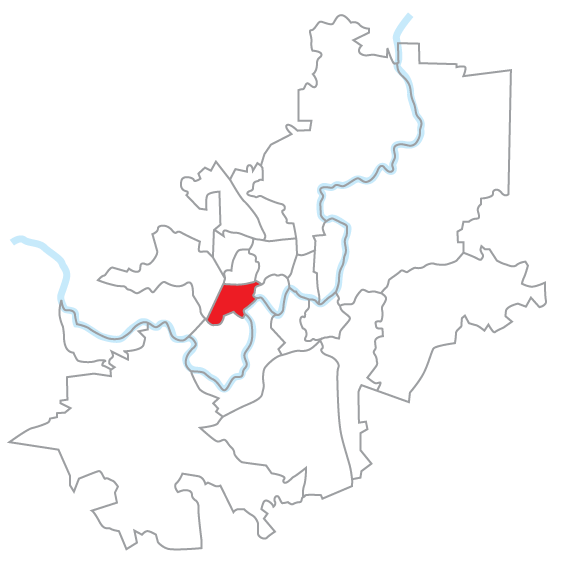

- Location of Karoliniškės
- Country: Lithuania
- County: Vilnius County
- Municipality: Vilnius city municipality

Area
  - Total: 4 km^{2} (1.5 sq mi)

Population (2021)
  - Total: 24,751
  - Density: 6,200/km^{2} (16,000/sq mi)
- Time zone: UTC+2 (EET)
  - Summer (DST): UTC+3 (EEST)

Karoliniškės is a microdistrict and eldership of Vilnius, Lithuania. Construction of this district started in 1971. Karoliniškės covers about 3.7 km^{2} in area. There is about 1.015 km^{2} of the slop area along the Neris River, and about 0.11 km^{2} of a small forest, called Pasakų parkas (park of fairy-tales).

The tallest structure in Lithuania, the Vilnius TV Tower, is also situated in this district. Karoliniškės was the main site of the January Events of 1991.

== History ==
The oldest inhabitants of the neighborhood of Karoliniškės tell that their village was named after a former mansion heiress Karolinka. From January 11 to January 13, 1991, 13 people died in the events near the Vilnius TV Tower.

Karoliniškės started to expand in 1971. After the January Events, 8 streets in Karoliniškės were renamed after the fallen defenders' names.
