= Fourteenth Seimas =

Fourteenth Seimas of Lithuania
←	Thirteenth Seimas of Lithuania	Fifteenth Seimas Of Lithuania	→
- Seimas Palace

Overview
- Legislative body: Seimas
- Jurisdiction: Lithuania
- Term: 2024—2028

The Fourteenth Seimas of Lithuania is a parliament (Seimas) in Lithuania. Elections took place on 13 October 2024, with the run-off on 27 October. The Seimas commenced its work on 14 November 2024 and is serving a four-year term until November 2028. There were none and still is none opposition leaders in this term.

== Elections ==
Parliamentary elections were held in Lithuania on 13 and 27 October 2024 to elect the 141 members of the Seimas. Members were elected in 71 single-member constituencies using the two-round system, and the remaining 70 in a single nationwide constituency using proportional representation. The first round was held on 13 October and the second round on 27 October.

The elections were won by the Social Democratic Party of Lithuania (LSDP), which secured 19.32% of the popular vote and 52 seats, up from 9.58% and 13 seats in the previous elections in 2020. The Homeland Union (TS–LKD), the largest party in the ruling centre-right coalition in the preceding Seimas, finished a distant second, securing 28 seats, down from its previous 50.

Following the first round of the election, the Social Democrats entered into coalition talks with the Lithuanian Farmers and Greens Union (LVŽS) and the Union of Democrats "For Lithuania" (DSVL), which had split from the latter. After the second round, the consultations were expanded to include the Liberals' Movement (LS), which had been part of the outgoing conservative-led coalition, and Dawn of Nemunas (PPNA), a new nationalist party that finished in third place overall.

The LSDP eventually reached a deal with DSVL and PPNA to form a coalition government. The Social Democrats' decision to include the Dawn of Nemunas party, whose founder is known for making controversial statements, prompted domestic and international backlash.

== Activities ==
Saulius Skvernelis was elected as the Speaker of the Fourteenth Seimas, but resigned on September 10, 2025 after his party (DSVL) was not join the new coalition after Gintautas Paluckas resigned as the prime minister. Juozas Olekas replaced him as the speaker. On June 6, 2026, another new coalition was formed, including LSDP-DSVL-LVŽS, but excluding the Dawn of Nemūnas. Mindaugas Sinkevičius was put forward as the candidate for prime minister. The Ruginienė Cabinet has stepped down on June 24, and the new Sinkevičius Cabinet was sworn in on July 14, 2026. The parliament in august started preparations for the European presidency of lithuania in december. A non-planned parliamentary session about education will take place on August 25th.

== Composition ==
=== Parliamentary groups ===
After the elections, the parliamentary groups were formed in the Seimas, largely on the party lines: the Group of Democrats "For Lithuania", the Homeland Union - Lithuanian Christian Democrats Group, the Liberal Movement Group, the Social Democratic Party of Lithuania Group, the Dawn of Nemunas Group, the Union of Lithuanian Farmers, Greens and Christian Families Group (containing all MPs of the LVŽS and the three members of the LLRA–KŠS), and the Mixed Group (containing five independents, a member of PLT, and a member of NS).

Seimas 2026-10-15
Group	Party	Elected seats	Current seats	Current group	Group leader
Social Democratic Party of Lithuania Group	LSDP	52	51	53	1) Remigijus Motuzas (until Sept 10, 2025); 2) Orinta Leiputė (from Sept 10, 2025)
Social Democratic Party of Lithuania Group	Independent	—N/a	2	53	1) Remigijus Motuzas (until Sept 10, 2025); 2) Orinta Leiputė (from Sept 10, 2025)
Homeland Union - Lithuanian Christian Democrats Group		28			1) Mindaugas Lingė (until Sept 17, 2025); 2) Laurynas Kasčiūnas (from Sept 18, 2025)
Dawn of Nemunas Group		20	17		Remigijus Žemaitaitis
Group of Democrats "For Lithuania"	DSVL	13 (Note: Linas Urmanavičius was elected while being on Union of Democrats "For Lithuania" electoral list, but represents Political Comitee "For Druskininkai". Lithuanian law limits person to being member of just single political party or electoral comitee at the same time.)	13	13	1) Linas Kukuraitis (until Sept 17, 2025); 2) Saulius Skvernelis (between Sept 18, 2025 – Mar 10, 2026); 3) Lukas Savickas (between Mar 10, 2026 – July 14, 2026); 4) Agnė Širinskienė (from July 14, 2026)
Group of Democrats "For Lithuania"	PC "FD"	1	—	13	1) Linas Kukuraitis (until Sept 17, 2025); 2) Saulius Skvernelis (between Sept 18, 2025 – Mar 10, 2026); 3) Lukas Savickas (between Mar 10, 2026 – July 14, 2026); 4) Agnė Širinskienė (from July 14, 2026)
Liberals' Movement Group		11* (Note: Following death of Jevgenij Šuklin)			Viktorija Čmilytė-Nielsen
Lithuanian Farmers, Greens and Christian Families Union Group	LVŽS	6 (Note: Ignas Vėgėlė and Rimas Jonas Jankūnas were both elected on Lithuanian Farmers and Greens Union list, but never had become their party members)		9	1) Aušrinė Norkienė (until Sept 10, 2025); 2) Ligita Girskienė (between Sept 10, 2025 – Mar 10, 2026); 3) Jaroslav Narkevič (from Mar 10, 2026 to Sep 15, 2026)4) Eimantas Kirkutis (From Sep 15, 2026)
Lithuanian Farmers, Greens and Christian Families Union Group	Independent	2	—	9	1) Aušrinė Norkienė (until Sept 10, 2025); 2) Ligita Girskienė (between Sept 10, 2025 – Mar 10, 2026); 3) Jaroslav Narkevič (from Mar 10, 2026 to Sep 15, 2026)4) Eimantas Kirkutis (From Sep 15, 2026)
Lithuanian Farmers, Greens and Christian Families Union Group	LLRA-KŠS	3		9	1) Aušrinė Norkienė (until Sept 10, 2025); 2) Ligita Girskienė (between Sept 10, 2025 – Mar 10, 2026); 3) Jaroslav Narkevič (from Mar 10, 2026 to Sep 15, 2026)4) Eimantas Kirkutis (From Sep 15, 2026)
Mixed Group (MSNG)	Independent	2	6	9	Viktoras Fiodorovas
Mixed Group (MSNG)	CDS	1	—	9	Viktoras Fiodorovas
Mixed Group (MSNG)	NS	1		9	Viktoras Fiodorovas
Mixed Group (MSNG)	PC "FD"	—N/a	1	9	Viktoras Fiodorovas
Mixed Group (MSNG)	TTS	—N/a	1	9	Viktoras Fiodorovas
Vacant		—N/a	1	—N/a	

=== Members ===
145 members have served in the Fourteenth Seimas. (normal members are members since 2024-11-14)

The members
Number	Name, Surname	Constituency	Electoral list	Parliamentary group	Notes
1.	Virginijus Alekna	Multi-Member	Liberal Movement	LSF	
2.	Vaida Aleknavičienė	46. Žiemgalos vakarinė	Social Democratic Party of Lithuania	LSDPF	
3.	Arvydas Anušauskas	15. Kalniečiai	Homeland Union - Lithuanian Christian Democrats	TS-LKDF	
4.	Laura Asadauskaitė	Multi-Member	Social Democratic Party of Lithuania	LSDPF	
5.	Dalia Asanavičiūtė	71. Worldwide	Homeland Union - Lithuanian Christian Democrats	TS-LKDF	
6.	Audronius Ažubalis	Multi-Member	Homeland Union - Lithuanian Christian Democrats	TS-LKDF	
7.	Valius Ąžuolas	Multi-Member	Lithuanian Farmers and Greens Union	LVŽ-KŠSF	
8.	Andrius Bagdonas	Multi-Member	Liberal Movement	LSF	
9.	Zigmantas Balčys	Multi-Member	Union of Democrats "For Lithuania"	DFVL	
10.	Giedrė Balčytė	Multi-Member	Homeland Union - Lithuanian Christian Democrats	TS-LKDF	
11.	Linas Balsys	Multi-Member	Social Democratic Party of Lithuania	LSDPF	
12.	Ruslanas Baranovas	Multi-Member	Social Democratic Party of Lithuania	LSDPF	
13.	Tadas Barauskas	50. Sėlos rytinė	Social Democratic Party of Lithuania	LSDPF	
14.	Rima Baškienė	Multi-Member	Union of Democrats "For Lithuania"	DFVL	
15.	Kęstutis Bilius	Multi-Member	Dawn of Nemūnas	NAF	
16.	Agnė Bilotaitė	Multi-Member	Homeland Union - Lithuanian Christian Democrats	TS-LKDF	Until 2026-10-13
17.	Šarūnas Birutis	53. Nalšios Pietinė	Social Democratic Party of Lithuania	LSDPF	
18.	Dainoras Baradauskas	Multi-Member	Dawn of Nemūnas	NAF until 2026-10-20, from 2026-10-20 MSNG	
19.	Ingrida Brazulienė	38. Mažeikių	Social Democratic Party of Lithuania	LSDPF	
20.	Saulius Bucevičius	Multi-Member	Dawn of Nemūnas	NAF	
21.	Rasa Budbergytė	Multi-Member	Social Democratic Party of Lithuania	LSDPF	
22.	Andrius Busila	29. Panevėžio vakarinė	Social Democratic Party of Lithuania	LSDPF	
23.	Algirdas Butkevičius	68. Vilkaviškio	Union of Democrats "For Lithuania"	DFVL	
24.	Saulius Čaplinskas	Multi-Member	Social Democratic Party of Lithuania	LSDPF	
25.	Viktorija Čmlytė-Nielsen	1. Senamiesčio-Žveryno	Liberal Movement	LSF	
26.	Petras Dargis	Multi-Member	Dawn of Nemūnas	NAF	
27.	Tomas Domarkas	35. Plungės-Rietavo	Dawn of Nemūnas	NAF	
28.	Giedrius Drukteinis	Multi-Member	Social Democratic Party of Lithuania	LSDPF	
29.	Arūnas Dudėnas	49. Deltuvos šiaurinė	Social Democratic Party of Lithuania	LSDPF	
30.	Viktoras Fiodoras	43. Kėdainių	Independent	MSNG	
31.	Vitaliijus Gailius	Multi-Member	Liberal Movement	LSF	
32.	Dainius Gaidžiauskas	Multi-Member	Lithuanian Farmers and Greens Union	LVŽ-KŠSF	
33.	Aidas Gedvilas	Multi-Member	Dawn of Nemūnas	NAF	
34.	Martynas Gedvilas	Multi-Member	Dawn of Nemūnas	NAF	
35.	Aistė Gedvilienė	Multi-Member	Homeland Union - Lithuanian Christian Democrats	TS-LKDF	
36.	Ilona Gelažnikienė	47. Žiemgalos rytinė	Social Democratic Party of Lithuania	LSDPF	
37.	Eugenijus Gentvilas	13. Pašilaičių	Liberal Movement	LSF	
38.	Simonas Gentvilas	Multi-Member	Liberal Movement	LSF	
39.	Ligita Girskienė	25. Marių	Lithuanian Farmers and Greens Union	LVŽ-KŠSF	
40.	Domas Griškevičius	26. Saulės	Union of Democrats "For Lithuania'	DFVL	
41.	Vytautas Grubliauskas	24. Baltijos	Social Democratic Party of Lithuania	LSDPF	
42.	Darius Jakavičius	64. Sūduvos šiaurinė	Social Democratic Party of Lithuania	LSDPF	
43.	Agnė Jakavičiūtė-Miliauskienė	40. Telšių	Union of Democrats "For Lithuania"	DFVL	
44.	Roma Janušonienė	27. Aušros	Social Democratic Party of Lithuania	LSDPF	
45.	Giedrimas Jeglinskas	Multi-Member	Union of Democrats "For Lithuania"	DFVL	Until 2026-04-16
46.	Linas Jonauskas	Multi-Member	Social Democratic Party of Lithuania	LSDPF	
47.	Vytautas Jucius	Multi-Member	Dawn of Nemūnas	NAF	
48.	Ričardas Juška	62. Karšuvos	Liberal Movement	LSF	
49.	Simonas Kairys	20. Centro-Žaliakalnio	Liberal Movement	LSF	
50.	Laurynas Kasčiūnas	9. Lazdynų	Homeland Union - Lithuanian Christian Democrats	TS-LKDF	
51.	Martynas Katelynas	69. Dzūkijos	Social Democratic Party of Lithuania	LSDPF	
52.	Robertas Kaunas	19. Aleksoto-Vilijampolės	Social Democratic Party of Lithuania	LSDPF	
53.	Liutauras Kazlavickas	10. Naujosios Vilnios	Homeland Union - Lithuanian Christian Democrats	TS-LKDF	
54.	Vytautas Kernagis	Multi-Member	Homeland Union - Lithuanian Christian Democrats	TS-LKDF	
55.	Eimantas Kirkutis	45. Šiaulių krašto	Lithuanian Farmers and Greens Union	LVŽ-KŠSF	
56.	Indrė Kižienė	61. Deltuvos pietinė	Social Democratic Party of Lithuania	LSDPF	
57.	Dainius Kreivys	12. Verkių	Homeland Union - Lithuanian Christian Democrats	TS-LKDF	
58.	Linas Kukuraitis	7. Justiniškių-Viršuliškių	Union of Democrats "For Lithuania"	DFVL	
59.	Raimondas Kuodis	Multi-Member	Homeland Union - Lithuanian Christian Democrats	TS-LKDF	
60.	Paulė Kuzmickienė	4. Žirmūnų	Homeland Union - Lithuanian Christian Democrats	TS-LKDF	
61.	Orinta Leiputė	16. Savanorių	Social Democratic Party of Lithuania	LSDPF	
62.	Arminas Lydeka	Multi-Member	Liberal Movement	LSF	
63.	Mindaugas Lingė	6.Šeškinės–Šnipiškių	Homeland Union - Lithuanian Christian Democrats	TS-LKDF	
64.	Saulius Luščikas	44. Radviliškio–Tytuvėnų	Social Democratic Party of Lithuania	LSDPF	
65.	Matas Maldeikis	Multi-Member	Homeland Union - Lithuanian Christian Democrats	TS-LKDF	
66.	Tomas Martinaitis	39. Žemaitijos šiaurinė	Social Democratic Party of Lithuania	LSDPF	
67.	Kęstutis Mažeika	63. Sūduvos pietinė	Union of Democrats "For Lithuania"	DFVL	
68.	Liudas Mažylis	Multi-Member	Homeland Union - Lithuanian Christian Democrats	TS-LKDF	Until 2024-12-05
69.	Alvydas Mockus	31. Gargždų	Social Democratic Party of Lithuania	LSDPF	
70.	Radvilė Morkūnaitė-Mikulėnienė	Multi-Member	Homeland Union - Lithuanian Christian Democrats	TS-LKDF	
71.	Remigijus Motuzas	5. Fabijoniškių	Social Democratic Party of Lithuania	LSDPF	
72.	Antanas Nedzinskas	Multi-Member	Social Democratic Party of Lithuania	LSDPF	
73.	Jaroslav Narkevič	56. Šalčininkų–Vilniaus	Lietuvos lenkų rinkimų akcija-Krikščioniškų šeimų sąjunga	LVŽ-KŠSF	
74.	Karolis Neimantas	36. Mėguvos	Dawn of Nemūnas	NAF	
75.	Aušrinė Norkienė	Multi-Member	Lithuanian Farmers and Greens Union	LVŽ-KŠSF	
76.	Juozas Olekas	Multi-Member	Social Democratic Party of Lithuania	LSDPF until 2025-09-11 Speaker of Seimas since 2025-09-11	
77.	Česlav Olševski	11. Vilniaus pietinė	Lietuvos lenkų rinkimų akcija-Krikščioniškų šeimų sąjunga	LVŽ-KŠSF	
78.	Gintautas Paluckas	Multi-Member	Social Democratic Party of Lithuania	LSDPF until 2026-04-24	
79.	Žygimantas Pavilionis	2. Naujamiesčio–Vilkpėdės	Homeland Union - Lithuanian Christian Democrats	TS-LKDF	
80.	Daiva Petkevičienė	22. Pajūrio	Dawn of Nemūnas	NAF	
81.	Modesta Petrauskaitė	33. Aukštaitijos	Social Democratic Party of Lithuania	LSDPF	
82.	Audrius Petrošius	23. Danės	Homeland Union - Lithuanian Christian Democrats	TS-LKDF	
83.	Arvydas Pocius	Multi-Member	Homeland Union - Lithuanian Christian Democrats	TS-LKDF	
84.	Karolis Podolskis	54. Marijampolė	Social Democratic Party of Lithuania	LSDPF	
85.	Raminta Popovienė	65. Raudonvario	Social Democratic Party of Lithuania	LSDPF	
86.	Mantas Poškus	Multi-Member	Dawn of Nemūnas	NAF	
87.	Tadas Prajara	Multi-Member	Social Democratic Party of Lithuania	LSDPF	
88.	Viktoras Pranckietis	Multi-Member	Liberal Movement	LSF	
89.	Robert Puchovič	Multi-Member	Dawn of Nemūnas	NAF	
90.	Algimantas Radvila	59. Kaišiadorių–Elektrėnų	Social Democratic Party of Lithuania	LSDPF	
91.	Audrius Radvilavičius	18. Panemunės	Social Democratic Party of Lithuania	LSDPF	
92.	Valdas Rakutis	Multi-Member	Homeland Union - Lithuanian Christian Democrats	TS-LKDF	
93.	Jurgis Razma	Multi-Member	Homeland Union - Lithuanian Christian Democrats	TS-LKDF	
94.	Darius Razmislevičius	17. Petrašiūnų–Gričiupio	Social Democratic Party of Lithuania	LSDPF	
95.	Jekaterina Rojaka	Multi-Member	Union of Democrats "For Lithuania"	DFVL	
96.	Bronis Ropė	Multi-Member	Lithuanian Farmers and Greens Union	LVŽ-KŠSF	
97.	Edita Rudelienė	Multi-Member	Liberal Movement	LSF	
98.	Inga Ruginienė	Multi-Member	Social Democratic Party of Lithuania	LSDPF	
99.	Julius Sabatauskas	Multi-Member	Social Democratic Party of Lithuania	LSDPF	
100.	Eugenijus Sabutis	60. Jonavos	Social Democratic Party of Lithuania	LSDPF	
101.	Tadas Sadauskis	34. Tauragės	Dawn of Nemūnas	NAF	
102.	Lukas Savickas	Multi-Member	Union of Democrats "For Lithuania"	DFVL	
103.	Vytautas Sinica	8. Pilaitės-Karoliniškių	National Alliance	MSNG	
104.	Rimantas Sinkevičius	Multi-Member	Social Democratic Party of Lithuania	LSDPF	
105.	Algirdas Sysas	Multi-Member	Social Democratic Party of Lithuania	LSDPF	
106.	Gintarė Skaistė	Multi-Member	Homeland Union - Lithuanian Christian Democrats	TS-LKDF	
107.	Matas Skamarakas	42. Raseinių–Josvainių	Social Democratic Party of Lithuania	LSDPF	
108.	Artūras Skardžius	Multi-Member	Dawn of Nemūnas	NAF	
109.	Saulius Skvernelis	Multi-Member	Union of Democrats "For Lithuania"	DFVL until 2026-04-14, since 2024-04-14 MSNG	
110.	Kazys Starkevičius	Multi-Member	Homeland Union - Lithuanian Christian Democrats	TS-LKDF	Until 2026-03-10
111.	Dovilė Šakalienė	Multi-Member	Social Democratic Party of Lithuania	LSDPF	
112.	Laurynas Šedvydis	21. Šilainių	Social Democratic Party of Lithuania	LSDPF	
113.	Vitalijus Šeršniovas	51. Utenos	Independant	MSNG	
114.	Ingrida Šimonytė	3. Antakalnio	Homeland Union - Lithuanian Christian Democrats	TS-LKDF	
115.	Agnė Širinskienė	Multi-Member	Dawn of Nemūnas	NAF until 2025-01-14, DFVL from 2025-01-14	
116.	Jurgita Šukevičienė	30. Alytaus	Social Democratic Party of Lithuania	LSDPF	
117.	Šarūnas Šukevičius	66. Garliavos	Social Democratic Party of Lithuania	LSDPF	
118.	Raimondas Šukys	Multi-Member	Dawn of Nemūnas	NAF	
119.	Lina Šukytė-Korsakė	Multi-Member	Dawn of Nemūnas	NAF	
120.	Jevgenij Šuklin	52. Nalšios Šiaurinė	Liberal Movement	LSF	Until 2026-05-28
121.	Rita Tamašunienė	57. Nemenčinės	Lietuvos lenkų rinkimų akcija-Krikščioniškų šeimų sąjunga	LVŽ-KŠSF	
122.	Tomas Tomilinas	Multi-Member	Union of Democrats "For Lithuania"	DFVL	
123.	Violeta Turauskaitė	37. Kuršo	Social Democratic Party of Lithuania	LSDPF	
124.	Daiva Ulbinaitė	55. Riešės	Homeland Union - Lithuanian Christian Democrats	TS-LKDF	
125.	Linas Urmanavičius	70. Jotvingių	Union of Democrats "For Lithuania"	DFVL until 2026-04-23, MSNG from 2026-04-23	
126.	Lilija Vaitiekūnienė	48. Sėlos vakarinė	Social Democratic Party of Lithuania	LSDPF	
127.	Arūnas Valinskas	Multi-Member	Homeland Union - Lithuanian Christian Democrats	TS-LKDF	
128.	Dainius Varnas	Multi-Member	Dawn of Nemūnas	NAF until 2025-10-14, MSNG from 2025-10-14 until 2025-12-16, DFVL From 2025-12-16	
129.	Ignas Vėgėlė	Multi-Member	Lithuanian Farmers and Greens Union	LVŽ-KŠSF until 2026-04-21, MSNG until 2026-04-21	
130.	Birutė Vėsaitė	Multi-Member	Social Democratic Party of Lithuania	LSDPF	
131.	Kęstutis Vilkauskas	58. Trakų–Vievio	Social Democratic Party of Lithuania	LSDPF	
132.	Ramūnas Vyžintas	28. Nevėžio	Social Democratic Party of Lithuania	LSDPF	
133.	Jūratė Zailskienė	67. Dainavos	Social Democratic Party of Lithuania	LSDPF	
134.	Emanuelis Zingeris	Multi-Member	Homeland Union - Lithuanian Christian Democrats	TS-LKDF	
135.	Artūras Zuokas	14. Naujininkų–Rasų	Party "Freedom and justice"	MSNG	
136.	Daiva Žebelienė	32. Šilutės	Dawn of Nemūnas	NAF	
137.	Remigijus Žemaitaitis	41. Kelmės–Šilalės	Dawn of Nemūnas	NAF	
138.	Rimas Jonas Jankūnas	Multi-Member	Lithuanian Farmers and Greens Union	LVŽ-KŠSF until 2026-04-21, since 2026-04-21 MSNG	Since 2024-11-19
139.	Vytautas Juozapaitis	Multi-Member	Homeland Union - Lithuanian Christian Democrats	TS-LKDF	Since 2024-11-19
140.	Rūta Miliūtė	Multi-Member	Union of Democrats "For Lithuania"	DFVL	Since 2024-11-19
141.	Paulius Visockas	Multi-Member	Social Democratic Party of Lithuania	LSDPF	Since 2024-11-19
142.	Jurgita Sejonienė	Multi-Member	Homeland Union - Lithuanian Christian Democrats	TS-LKDF	Since 2024-12-10
143.	Angele Jakavonytė	Multi-Member	Homeland Union - Lithuanian Christian Democrats	TS-LKDF	Since 2026-03-12
144.	Vilija Targamadzė	Multi-Member	Union of Democrats "For Lithuania"	DFVL from 2026-04-21 until 2026-05-21, LSDPF from 2026-05-21	Since 2026-04-21
145.	Kęstutis Masiulis	Multi-Member	Homeland Union - Lithuanian Christian Democrats	TS-LKDF	Since 2026-10-15

== By-Elections in this Seimas Term ==
By-elections in the term. Only one is schedueled to happen, none has happened before this one (the 2026 Northern Nalšia District by-election). The by-elections in this term:

1. 2026 Northern Nalšia District By-election
