= Maldeikis =

Maldeikis is a Lithuanian surname. Notable people with the surname include:

- Eugenijus Maldeikis (born 1958), Lithuanian politician, former husband of Aušra, father of Matas
- Aušra Maldeikienė (born 1958), Lithuanian politician, former wife of Eugenijus, mother of Matas
- Matas Maldeikis (born 1980), Lithuanian politician, son of Eugenijus and Aušra
