= 2026 Northern Nalšia district by-election =

Election in Lithuania

- 8 November 2026 (first round); 22 November 2026 (second round)
- Turnout: 32.20% (first round) ▼9.71pp 27.87% (second round) ▼11.91pp
Candidate	Gintautas Kindurys	Mėta Paulauskė
Party	LVŽS	LS
Popular vote	1,920	1,573
Percentage	20.95	17.16%
MP before election
Jevgenij Šuklin
LS
MP
Mėta Paulauskė
LS

The 2026 Northern Nalšia district by-election will take place on 8 November 2026 to elect a new member of the Seimas following the death of Jevgenij Šuklin, a member of the Liberals' Movement.

== Background ==
The by-election was triggered by the death of incumbent member of the Seimas Jevgenij Šuklin, who died suddenly at the age of 40. Under Lithuanian law, a by-election must be held when a seat elected in a single-member constituency becomes vacant as a result of the incumbent's resignation, impeachment or death.

The Speaker of the Seimas, Juozas Olekas, proposed that the by-election be held on 8 November, with a possible second round on 22 November. The Seimas approved the proposal on 30 June 2026.

=== 2024 result ===
At the 2024 parliamentary election, the Liberals' Movement won the constituency with Jevgenij Šuklin as its candidate. The constituency had previously been considered a stronghold of the Lithuanian Farmers and Greens Union.

Candidate	Party	First round		Second round	
Candidate	Party	Votes	%	Votes	%
Gintautas Kindurys	Lithuanian Farmers and Greens Union	2,698	22.76	5,594	48.64
Jevgenij Šuklin	Liberals' Movement	2,515	21.21	5,906	51.36
Nikolajus Gusevas	Social Democratic Party of Lithuania	1,574	13.28		
Vytautas Bakas	Union of Democrats "For Lithuania"	1,521	12.83		
Imantas Umbražiūnas	Homeland Union	978	8.25		
Nikolajus Lebedevičius	Lithuanian Regions Party	862	7.27		
Viktor Voronin	Electoral Action of Poles in Lithuania	786	6.63		
Natalja Tomsha	Labour Party	435	3.67		
Vidmantas Eigėlis	Freedom Party	243	2.05		
Nataliya Rukosueva	People and Justice Union	243	2.05		
Total		11,855	100.00	11,500	100.00
Valid votes		11,855	95.89	11,500	98.27
Invalid/blank votes		508	4.11	203	1.73
Total votes		12,363	100.00	11,703	100.00
Registered voters/turnout		29,464	41.96	29,476	39.70
LS gain from LVŽS					

== Candidates ==
Eleven political parties are planning to contest the by-election.

Each independent candidate had to collect 1,000 supporting signatures physically or online and present them by 18 September 2026 for the confirmation of the candidacy. Registered political parties that were participants in the 2024 Lithuanian parliamentary election are exempted from such an obligation. Candidates were approved by the VRK on October 1st.

=== Withdrawn candidates ===
==== Eduardas Vaitkus (Independent) ====
Eduardas Vaitkus, presidential candidate in the 2024 presidential elections and a candidate in the Šalčininkų-Vilniaus electoral district in the 2024 Seimas election, registered to run as an independent candidate for the by-election, but then announced his withdrawal on 14 September, due to a lack of support shown for his candidacy throughout the campaigning period. He got 25 signatures online, while physical signatures are still unknown.

==== Ruslanas Baranovas (LSDP) ====
In July 2026, the Social Democratic Party of Lithuania initially nominated sitting Seimas member Ruslanas Baranovas elected through the multi-member constituency as its candidate. The decision to nominate an already active parliamentarian drawn significant criticism, including potential challenges to its constitutionality.

The party subsequently withdrew Baranovas from the contest on 10 July and nominated former interior minister Vladislav Kondratovič instead.

== Debates ==
On October 15, a civic monitoring organisation "Žinau, ką renku" organised a by-election debate at the Visaginas Cultural Centre "Sedulina". The debate sponsored by the Central Electoral Commission was published online on October 16.

Date	Organiser	Moderator	Participants										
Date	Organiser	Moderator	P Present I Invitee N Non-invitee										
Date	Organiser	Moderator	Adomavičius	Dainys	Kindurys	Kondratovič	Lebedevičius	Paukštė	Paulauskė	Šakalys	Šildiajėv	Štraupaitė	Voronin
15 October	"Žinau, ką renku"	Jokūbas Naglinskas	P	I	P	P	I	P	P	P	P	P	I
16 October	Central Electoral Commission (Lithuania)	Edmundas Jakilaitis	I	P	P	P	P	I	P	P	P	P	I

== Results ==
Candidate	Party	First round		Second round	
Candidate	Party	Votes	%	Votes	%
Gintautas Kindurys	Lithuanian Farmers and Greens Union	1,920	21.30	3,860	49.47
Mėta Paulauskė	Liberals' Movement	1,573	17.45	3,942	50.53
Dalia Štraupaitė	People and Justice Union	1,365	15.14		
Nikolajus Lebedevičius	Lithuanian Regions Party	927	10.29		
Vladislav Kondratovič	Social Democratic Party of Lithuania	861	9.55		
Viktor Voronin	Electoral Action of Poles in Lithuania	748	8.30		
Ignotas Adomavičius	Dawn of Nemunas	589	6.54		
Antanas Šakalis	Union of Democrats "For Lithuania"	514	5.70		
Andrej Šildiajėv	Homeland Union	221	2.45		
Giedrius Dainys	Centre-Right Union	166	1.84		
Maksim Paukštė	Freedom Party	129	1.43		
Total		9,013	100.00	7,802	100.00
Valid votes		9,013	98.35	7,802	98.27
Invalid/blank votes		151	1.65	137	1.73
Total votes		9,164	100.00	7,939	100.00
Registered voters/turnout		28,459	32.20	28,457	27.90

First Round (November 8th):

Turnout of the first round
Early voting	8.00	9.00	10.00	11.00	12.00	13.00	14.00	15.00	16.00	17.00	18.00	19.00	20.00	Total
9.49%	0.35%	1.12%	3.03%	6.07%	9.50%	12.35%	14.95%	16.93%	18.61%	20.30%	21.42%	22.13%	22.74%	32.20%

Second round (November 22nd):

Turnout of the second round
Early voting	8.00	9.00	10.00	11.00	12.00	13.00	14.00	15.00	16.00	17.00	18.00	19.00	20.00	Total
9.42%	0.27%	0.73%	1.97%	4.23%	6.72%	8.92%	11.11%	12.85%	14.55%	15.93%	17.04%	17.88%	18.45%	27.87%

== Aftermath ==
Mėta Paulauskė is expected to swear in, during the next sitting of the parliament (which is december 1st).
