= Central Electoral Commission =

Central Electoral Commission may refer to:

- Central Election Commission (Albania)
- Central Election Commission of Belarus
- Central Elections Office of Cyprus
- Central Elections Committee of Israel
- Central Election Commission (Kazakhstan)
- Central Election Commission (Kosovo)
- Central Election Management Council of Japan
- Central Electoral Commission (Lithuania)
- Central Electoral Commission of Moldova
- Central Election Committee (North Korea)
- Central Elections Commission (Palestine)
- Central Election Commission (Russia)
- Central Election Commission (Taiwan)
- Central Election Commission (Ukraine)

== See also ==
- Election commission#List of election commissions
