= Labourist Party (Lithuania) =

Labourist Party Leiboristų partija
- Abbreviation: LP
- Leader: Donatas Janulevičius
- Founders: Viktoras Fiodorovas
- Founded: June 15, 2008
- Dissolved: May 14, 2013
- Split from: Labour Party
- Merged into: Labour Party
- Headquarters: Pakalnės g. 7-1, Vilnius
- Membership: 1,059 (2013)
- Political position: Centre-left
- Colours: Blue

The Labourist Party (Lithuanian: Leiboristų partija) (Note: The accurate translation of the party's name would be Labour Party, same as the party it split from - with somewhat different meaning in the original language, referring to "labourist" members rather than the noun "labour". Leiboristų partija is used in Lithuanian to refer to the UK Labour Party. As there is little to no English content on the party, it is unclear what is the common translation of the name, so Labourist Party has been used to distinguish it from its more well known counterpart.) was a short-lived centre-left political party in Lithuania. It split from the Labour Party in 2008 and merged back into it in 2013. According to Viktor Uspaskich, the party existed as a fallback party during Labour's "dark accounting" financial fraud case.

== History ==
The Labourist Party was established on 15 June 2008 with 1433 founding members. The party's first chairman and founder was 21-year old chairman of the Labour Party's youth organization "Darbas", Viktoras Fiodorovas. Though the party claimed independence from Labour, Lietuvos rytas reported that buses belonging to companies owned by Viktor Uspaskich were seen being used for the founding conference. The party claimed that its interests were youth issues and education.

On 23 August, the party formed an electoral coalition with Labour, called "Labour Party + Youth", to participate in the 2008 Lithuanian parliamentary election. The party nominated Uspaskich as the "youth delegated candidate" in the coalition's electoral list. From 2009, despite officially remaining chairman of the Labourist Party until December 2012, Fiodorovas worked as Uspaskich's assistant in the European Parliament as well as manager of the Labour Party headquarters. The party's close attachment to Labour created rumors that it was founded as a way for Labour members to continue participating in politics if the original party was declared guilty in its ongoing "dark accounting" case and dissolved.

The party did not participate in any other election. In 2012, the Central Election Commission reported that the party did not have any offices, any branches, and was not active in any capacity throughout the year.

== Dissolution ==
At the end of October 2012, ahead of the second round of the 2012 Lithuanian parliamentary election, prosecutors reclassified the charges against the defendants in the Labour Party case. The General Prosecutor's Office filed fraud charges against the Labour Party, its leader Viktor Uspaskich, members Vytautas Gapšys, Vitalija Vonžutaitė, and the party's former finance officer Marina Liutkevičienė. Members of the party claimed that the prosecutors intend to liquidate the party.

In response, the Labour Party began seeking unification with other political parties to be reorganized and become a new legal entity, which would make the charges against the party invalid. Though amendments to political organization law were proposed to prevent this, they were declared a violation of the Constitution of Lithuania. The Labourist Party agreed to merge with the Labour Party on 24 April 2013, creating the Labour Party (Labourists) (Lithuanian: Darbo partija (leiboristai)). After the reorganization process, the Vilnius Regional Court dismissed the case against the party, declaring that it had ceased to exist as a legal entity. Prosecutors, representatives of the Labour Party, the convicted persons and their lawyers appealed the Vilnius Regional Court's verdict to the Lithuanian Court of Appeal. The Court of Appeal acquitted the individual members of the party of fraud charges, and the Supreme Court of Lithuania declared that the Labour Party could no longer be held liable because the statute of limitations had expired.
