= Gintaras Steponavičius =

Lithuanian lawyer and former politician

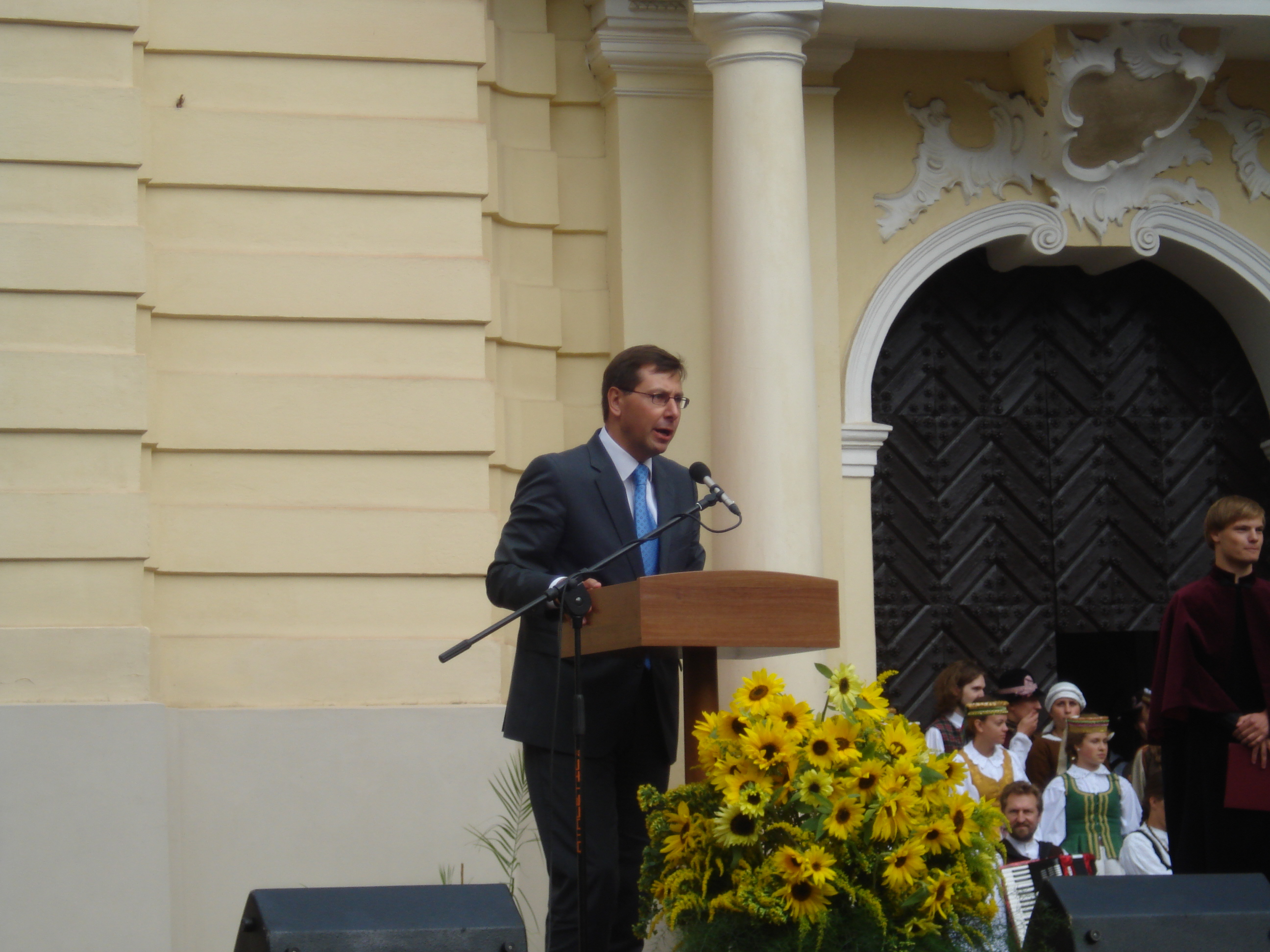

Minister of Education and Science
- In office 9 December 2008 – 13 December 2012
- Prime Minister: Andrius Kubilius
- Preceded by: Algirdas Monkevičius
- Succeeded by: Dainius Pavalkis

Personal details
- Born: 23 July 1967 (age 59) Klaipėda, Lithuanian SSR, Soviet Union
- Party: Lithuanian Liberal Movement

Gintaras Steponavičius (born 23 July 1967 in Klaipėda) is a Lithuanian former Liberal politician, retiring from politics in 2020. He was member of the Seimas and Senior Deputy Chair of the Lithuanian Liberal Movement Party. Steponavičius was the Minister of Education and Science in Kubilius Cabinet.

== Biography ==
After graduation in 1985 from the Antanas Vienuolis School in Vilnius, he graduated in 1992 with a Diploma in Legal Studies at the Law Faculty of Vilnius University. He studied in 1990 in The Hague, Netherlands and in 1991 at the University of Copenhagen in Denmark. In 1992 he attended the European Institute of the University of Birmingham in the UK, and later the Academy of European Law in Florence, Italy, and the Royal University of Groningen in the Netherlands. Between 1991 and 1994 he worked at the Ministry of Foreign Affairs of the Republic of Lithuania whilst studying, and from 1994 to 2004 he was a lecturer at the Institute for International Relations and Political Sciences of Vilnius University. Between 1994 and 2000 he was coordinator of Friedrich Naumann Foundation in Lithuania and between 1994 and 1996 was a contributor to the quarterly journal East European Constitutional Review of the University of Chicago and between 1997 and 2000, columnist of the weekly newspaper Atgimimas and member of the City Council of Vilnius, and chairman of the Liberal Group.

Since 2000, Steponavičius has been a member of the Seimas (Deputy Speaker of the Seimas from 2000 to 2004 and Vice Chairman of the Seimas from 2005 to 2008). Between 2004 and 2006 he was a Member of the Parliamentary Committee on Education, Science and Culture and between 2006 and 2008 he was a Member of the Committee of Legal Affairs. Since 10 December 2008 he has been Minister of Education in the 15th and in the 16th Government of Lithuania. He was the leader of opposition of lithuania.

== Bribery, money laundering charges ==
In 2016, Steponavičius has been involved in the 2016 Lithuanian Liberal Movement's bribery scandal involving MG Baltic, a business conglomerate with perceived Russian connections, and was separately suspected of money laundering through his charity organization "Laisvės studijų centras" ("Centre for Freedom Studies") as well as another personal charity.

== Lithuania-Taiwan Forum ==
Since March 2021 Steponavičius has been chairing Lithuania-Taiwan Forum, an NGO supporting Taiwan independence. Mantas Adomėnas, a conservative politician accused of influence peddling on behalf of the same conglomerate, is also part of the initiative.

== Personal life ==
Steponavičius is married to Vaidė, his third wife, and has a son (Mykolas) from his first marriage and a daughter (Urtė) from his second marriage.
