= Lina Petronienė =

Lithuanian civil servant (born 1958)

Chairwoman of the Central Electoral Commission of Lithuania
- Incumbent
- Assumed office 22 June 2023
- President: Gitanas Nausėda
- Prime Minister: Ingrida Šimonytė; Gintautas Paluckas
- Preceded by: Jolanta Petkevičienė

Personal details
- Education: Vilnius University; Mykolas Romeris University

Lina Petronienė (Lithuanian: [ˈlʲiːnɐ pɛˈtrɔːnʲɪɛ̃ː]) is a Lithuanian government official, analyst programmer and a senior specialist who has been serving as the Chairwoman of the Central Electoral Commission of Lithuania since 22 June 2023. Since 2007, she has been the Head of the Political Parties and Political Campaigns Financing Control Division of the Secretariat of the Central Electoral Commission of the Republic of Lithuania.

She was appointed as Chair by the Seimas after Jolanta Petkevičienė resigned from office on 28 March 2023.

== Education ==
She earned a Master's degree in Computer Science from Vilnius University in 1997 and a Master's degree in Law from Mykolas Romeris University in 2010.

== Chairwoman of the Central Electoral Commission (2023-present) ==
=== Nomination and appointment ===
In 2023, Viktorija Čmilytė-Nielsen nominated her for the position, and she was appointed Chairwoman on 22 June 2023 following a secret vote in the Seimas.

=== Seimas vote ===
In the secret vote, 68 members of the Seimas supported the nomination, while 9 voted against it. The same number of politicians abstained.

=== Elections ===
She has overseen and managed the following elections:

- 2024 Presidential Election
- 2024 Lithuanian parliamentary election
- 2024 European Parliament election

=== Referendums ===
- Dual citizenship

== Career ==
Her career includes serving as an analyst programmer in the Lithuanian Seimas Chancellery from 2001 to 2007, completing a six-week internship at the European Parliament's Parliamentary Research and Documentation Centre in 2003, working as an employee and later as an information systems specialist, consultant, and senior specialist at the Central Electoral Commission of Lithuania from 1996 to 2001, and as a programmer at the Lithuanian Medical Library from 1995 to 1996.

== Personal life ==
She can speak English and Russian. Her hobbies include reading books, travelling, hiking, and photography.
