= Linas Urmanavičius =

Lithuanian politician (born 1961)

Member of the Seimas
- Assuming office 14 November 2024
- Succeeding: Zenonas Streikus
- Constituency: Jotvingiai

Personal details
- Born: 11 June 1961 (age 64)
- Party: Political Comitee "For Druskininkai"

Linas Urmanavičius (born 11 June 1961) is a Lithuanian politician who was elected member of the Fourteenth Seimas in 2024. He serves as deputy mayor of Druskininkai.
