= Aušra Maldeikienė =

Lithuanian politician (born 1958)

Aušra Maldeikienė MEP
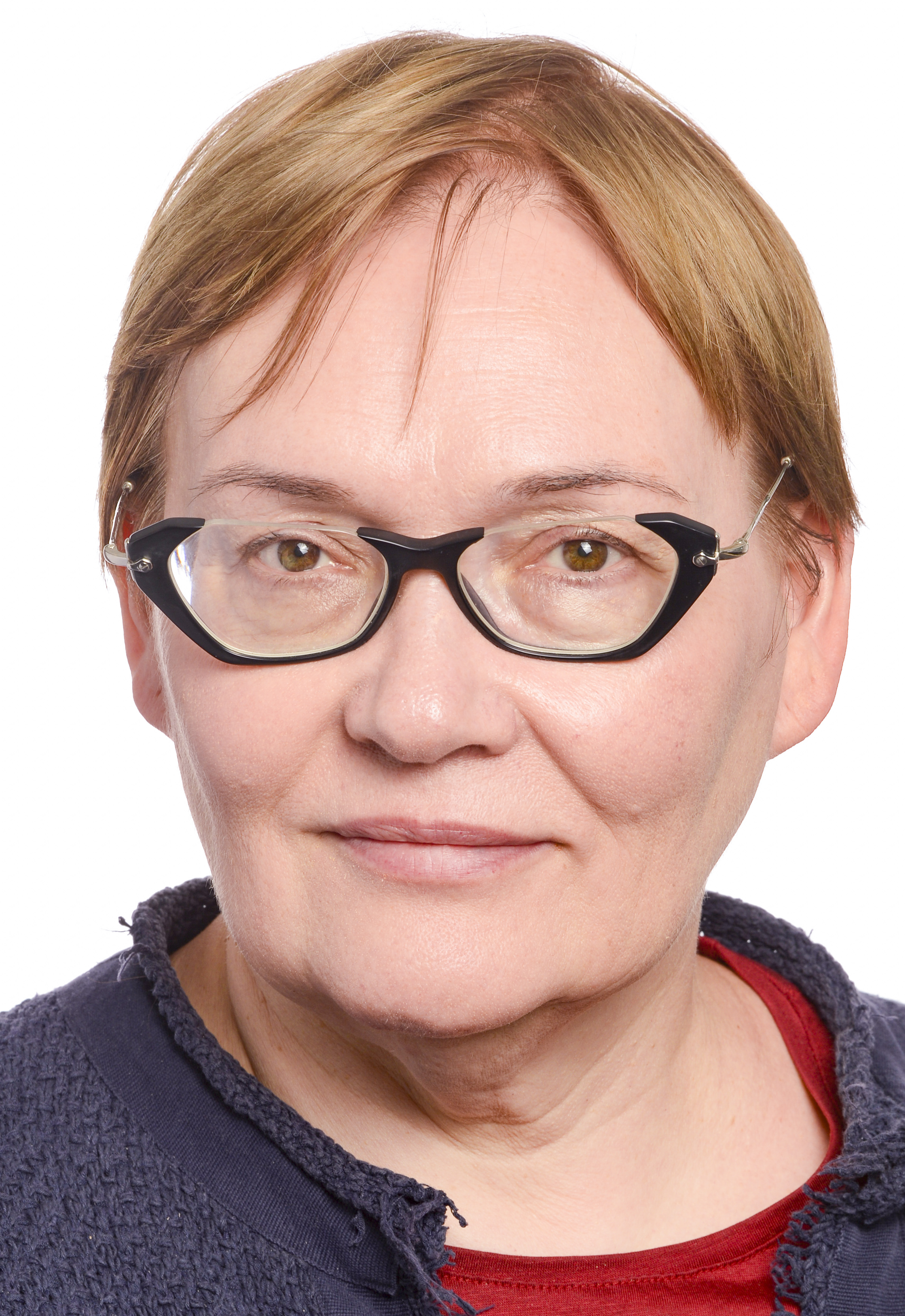

Member of the European Parliament
- Incumbent
- Assumed office 2 July 2019
- Constituency: Lithuania

Member of the Seimas
- In office 14 November 2016 – 30 June 2019
- Preceded by: Šarūnas Gustainis
- Succeeded by: Paulė Kuzmickienė
- Constituency: Žirmūnai

Vilnius City Councilor
- In office 22 April 2015 – 13 November 2016
- Succeeded by: Gintautas Terleckas

Personal details
- Born: 4 June 1958 (age 68) Palanga, Lithuanian SSR, Soviet Union
- Party: Homeland Union (2023- ) Independent (until 2023)
- Other political affiliations: European People's Party (2019- ) Liberal Democratic Party (2004)
- Education: Lomonosov Moscow State University
- Profession: Political economist, lecturer
- Website: www.maldeikiene.lt

Aušra Seibutytė-Maldeikienė (born 4 June 1958) is a Lithuanian political economist, politician, lecturer, teacher, publicist and book author.

In 2019 she was elected to the European Parliament, having previously sat as a member of the Seimas (Lithuanian Parliament) since 2016 and Vilnius City Council (2015–2016).

== Biography ==
After graduating from Antanas Vienuolis Secondary School (currently Vytautas Magnus Gymnasium) in Vilnius in 1976, Aušra Maldeikienė studied in the Faculty of Finance and Credit at the Vilnius University (then named Vilnius Order of the Red Banner of Labour State University of Vincas Kapsukas) and continued the studies in the Economics Faculty at the Lomonosov Moscow State University. She graduated from the latter in 1982, obtaining a qualification of Economist and Lecturer in Political Economy.

From 1982 to 1984 she worked in Vilnius University and lectured in Aleksandras Stulginskis University (then the Lithuanian Academy of Agriculture). She continued as an aspirant at the Lomonosov Moscow State University from 1984 till 1987 and defended her dissertation "Main economic law of the socialism under the conditions of intense economy" obtaining a Candidate of Economic Sciences degree (which in Lithuania is now recognized as PhD in Social Science). Later, in 2007, she also received a master's degree in Religious Sciences at the Centre for Religious Studies and Research, Vilnius University.

Since 1987 she has lectured in Lithuanian Veterinary Academy (now Veterinary Academy at the Lithuanian University of Health Sciences). Since 1990 she was a columnist and analyst in a national newspaper Lietuvos rytas. From 1993 till 1997 she was a spokesperson and head of the Public Relations Unit in Vilnius bank (now SEB Bank). From 1997 till 2000 she was a chief editor of Business Section in the news agency Baltic News Service. From 1999 till 2003 she was a lecturer in the International Business School at Vilnius University (now Vilnius University Business School). From 1999 till 2000 she had undergone a course in media (column-writing) at Green Templeton College (the University of Oxford). From 2001 till 2013 she was a Teacher of Economics in Vilnius Jesuit High School and from 2004 till 2016 as an associate professor at the Department of Econometric Analysis, Faculty of Mathematics and Informatics, Vilnius University.

She has written economic handbooks for schools, as well as other books on economics, finances and business, Economy of Lies becoming a bestseller in Lithuania, and translated eight books of foreign authors to Lithuanian. She participated in column "Economist commentary" in national radio station "Žinių radijas", commented economic events, published articles in the nationals news portal DELFI, and has her own blog. Her publications include economic, social exclusion, taxes (value added tax, income tax, estate taxes), national institutions, e.g. Lithuanian social security fund SoDra, tax evasion, her regular reports of a work as a city council member, comments on public life and analysis of fiction literature.

== Political career ==
=== Early beginnings ===
After one symbolic period of membership in the Liberal Democratic Party (now Order and Justice), which she joined in order to protest the "overly harsh" treatment by opponents of Rolandas Paksas (president at that time, undergoing impeachment), she was a candidate of the Civic Democratic party at the 2009 elections of the European Parliament. In 2015 Lithuanian municipal and 2016 Lithuanian parliamentary elections she participated together with a party "Lithuanian List", though she didn't become its member, and is currently an independent politician.

In 2015 she was elected to the Vilnius City Council.

=== Member of the Lithuanian Parliament, 2016–2019 ===
In 2016 Maldeikienė was elected to the Seimas in a single-member district constituency of Žirmūnai (Vilnius City). As an MP she was a deputy chair of the Non-attached Members faction and served as a deputy chair of the Committee on European Affairs and member of Committee on Audit, as well as a member in the Freedom Prize Commission and Commission for the Rights of People with Disabilities.

In June 2018 Maldeikienė affirmed her candidacy in the Lithuanian presidential election of 2019, announcing her electoral programme, composed of 95 theses, as an allusion to Ninety-five Theses by Martin Luther that started the Reformation (though she is a Catholic herself). Before considering it, Maldeikienė encouraged Ingrida Šimonytė, another Parliament member, to run for the presidency instead. Šimonytė made this decision in November 2018, upon being granted support from the party of Homeland Union - Lithuanian Christian Democrats (though staying an independent).

In February 2019 Maldeikienė announced she was no longer running for presidency, as she attained her goal of inciting more debates (also expressing disappointment at them being not serious enough). On her personal website and social media account she started to publish weekly reviews, analyzing campaign actions of the remaining presidential candidates in the light of the developments of national and global politics. With the support by Aušra Maldeikienė continuing, Ingrida Šimonytė received the highest number of votes of all candidates at the presidential election round in May 2019, but lost the second round and did not take the office.

=== Member of the European Parliament, 2019–present ===
Later in February 2019 Maldeikienė was registered as a candidate for the 2019 European Parliament election by the public election committee "Aušros Maldeikienės traukinys" (Lithuanian "The train of Aušra Maldeikienė"). Such committees made up from a number of willing voters serve as an alternative to the parties in order to enable independent candidates to run for some offices. In April 2019 "Aušros Maldeikienės traukinys" became the first and only electoral list in Lithuania that gathered enough electronic signatures to participate in the European Parliament elections (without the need to rely partly on paper signatures, like all other electoral lists had to). Aušra Maldeikienė's electoral committee won a seat at the European Parliament in May 2019, resulting in her becoming one among 11 of its members elected in Lithuania. Since her seat in the Seimas became vacant, Aušra Maldeikienė asserted that she will support the candidacy of independent Rasa Žemaitė, who was also in the list of "Aušros Maldeikienės traukinys" in the upcoming September 2019 elections in constituency of Žirmūnai.

In its electoral programme "Aušros Maldeikienės traukinys" has expressed intentions, if elected, to join one of the firmly pro-European factions, e.g. ALDE, European Greens or a new group based on Emmanuel Macron's "La République En Marche!" if such was to form. In June 2019 Aušra Maldeikienė announced she's joining European People's Party's (Christian Democrats) group, after evaluating the new transformations of ALDE (merging with other political forces to form Renew Europe) and the possible mismatch of her declared views to theirs, as well as, according to her, being rejected by the European Greens due to the objection of their member from Lithuania, Bronis Ropė. When the evaluations of the campaign expenses started to appear in the media, it was ascertained that "Aušros Maldeikienės traukinys" spent only a bit more than EUR 5 thousand for European Parliament elections - much less than all the other electoral lists in Lithuania, which dedicated from EUR 7 thousand to 254 thousand (EUR 95 thousand on average). In a press conference, organized after the elections, Aušra Maldeikienė provided statistics, showing that differently than some other electoral lists, her committee didn't get to use funding for elections from the national budget, instead considerably relying on small (EUR 12 or less) donations from individuals, which it gathered much more than all the remaining electoral lists.

In July 2019, Maldeikienė started her work as a Member of the European Parliament within the European People's Party's group, however remaining an independent. She was selected to work in two Committees of the European Parliament: Committee on Economic and Monetary Affairs and Committee on Budgets. In addition to her committee assignments, she is part of the European Parliament Intergroup on Disability.

In November 2019, a website "Europos žinios" (European News) was established, publishing articles of Aušra Maldeikienė and other authors. The description of it says "it was created as a result of the promise of Aušra Maldeikienė to bring more of European policy questions into the national public space".

== Personal life ==
Her husband from 1979 till 2017 was Eugenijus Maldeikis, a Lithuanian economist, politician (former minister of Economy, the Seimas member, European Parliament member and Vilnius City Councillor). They have two sons, Matas (born 1980), the Seimas member since 2020, and Mykolas (born 1987).

In September 2019, it was made public that Aušra Maldeikienė has stage II breast cancer, with her telling the media that the unexpected diagnosis reached her in August 2019. In May 2020, in her social media account Aušra Maldeikienė announced that her treatment has finished and that there are no signs of the cancer remaining and thanked her doctors.

Since January 2017 Maldeikienė has been hosting a book club.

Besides her native Lithuanian language, Maldeikienė speaks English, Russian and some French.

== Bibliography ==
- Melo ekonomika: publicistika. – Vilnius: Alma littera, 2013. – 269 p. – ISBN 978-609-01-1161-1
- Išmokite skaičiuoti savo pinigus. – 2-asis leidimas. – Vilnius: Tyto alba, 2005. – 388 p.: iliustr. – ISBN 9986-16-459-1
