= Leader of the Opposition (Lithuania) =

The Leader of the Opposition in the Republic of Lithuania is a member of the Seimas and its elders' council who opposes the prime minister. It is a position recognised by the Seimas.

By the Seimas Statute, the leader of the opposition can be elected by a faction or a coalition of parties that make up at least half of the opposition in the Seimas opposition. It is more of a symbolic position in the politics of Lithuania. The leader of the opposition is a member of the elders council of the seimas, and speaks first in the tribune during important discussions after the prime minister. The leader of the opposition does not have a shadow government.

== List ==
No.	Portrait	Name	Took office	Left office	Party	Term
1.		Vytautas Landsbergis	November 28, 1992	October 25, 1995	Homeland Union	VI
2.		Gediminas Vagnorius	October 25, 1995	November 19, 1996	Homeland Union	VI
No one held this position in the Seventh Seimas
3.		Vytenis Andriukaitis	October 24, 2000	July 11, 2001	Social Democratic Party of Lithuania-Democratic Labour Party of Lithuania	VIII
4.		Rolandas Paksas	July 12, 2001	November 1, 2001	Liberal and Centre Union	VIII
5.		Gintaras Steponavičius	November 12, 2001	December 21, 2001	Liberal and Centre Union	VIII
6.		Andrius Kubilius	January 20, 2005	September 19, 2006	Homeland Union	IX
7.		Gediminas Kirkilas	December 9, 2008	June 15, 2009	Social Democratic Party of Lithuania	X
8.		Valentinas Mazuronis	June 16, 2009	March 9, 2010	Order and Justice	X
9.		Vytautas Gapšys	March 10, 2010	September 20, 2010	Labour Party	X
10.		Algirdas Butkevičius	September 21, 2010	March 16, 2011	Social Democratic Party of Lithuania	X
(9)		Vytautas Gapšys	March 17, 2011	September 19, 2011	Labour Party	X
(8)		Valentinas Mazuronis	September 20, 2011	March 12, 2012	Order and Justice	X
(10)		Algirdas Butkevičius	March 13, 2012	September 10, 2012	Social Democratic Party of Lithuania	X
(9)		Vytautas Gapšys	September 11, 2012	November 16, 2012	Labour Party	X
(6)		Andrius Kubilius	December 18, 2012	November 13, 2016	Homeland Union	XI
11.		Viktorija Čmilytė-Nielsen	March 26, 2019	September 10, 2019	Liberals' Movement	XII
12.		Julius Sabatauskas	September 10, 2019	March 10, 2020	Social Democratic Party of Lithuania	XII
13.		Gabrielius Landsbergis	March 10, 2020	November 13, 2020	Homeland Union	XII
14.		Saulius Skvernelis	March 25, 2021	September 10, 2021	Union of Democrats "For Lithuania"	XIII
15?	None					XIV

== The current position of the post ==
No one is the current leader of opposition despite talks in early 2025 between the Homeland Union and the Liberals' Movement. There is still a medium posibility for an opposition leader in the 14th seimas.

=== Possible candidates to the post in the near future (14th seimas) ===
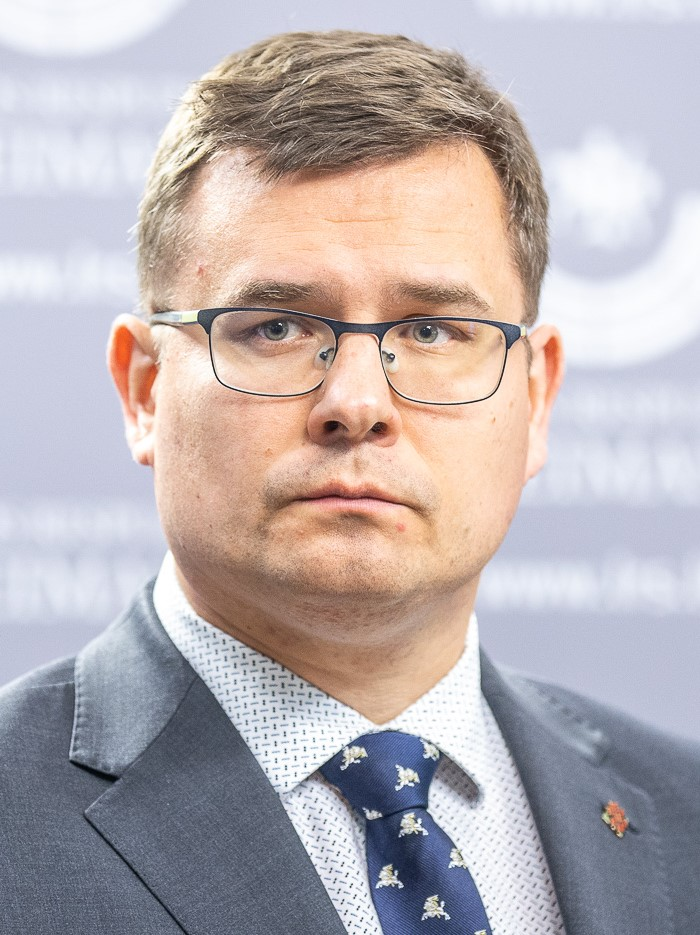

==== Laurynas Kasčiūnas (Leader of the TS-LKD) ====
Laurynas Kasčiūnas is a more conservative leader of the TS-LKD, and has criticized the current LSDP government. He has many times said that LSDP could as a very good step, go into a minority government, to which the leader of LSDP and the current Prime minister - Mindaugas Sinkevičius, said no, because he wants a stable majority. Laurynas said that the opposition block of TS-LKD and LRLS would help the minority government in very needfull laws (like the 2007 LSDP and TS-LKD back up agreement), which the PM said no to. Laurynas has recently criticized the Finance minister Taurimas Valys, as did most of opposition and even the government, for being very unprofessional, and not answering the questions of the MP. Plus, the budget which the ministry with the minister's commanding made, was very much criticized by Laurynas.
