= Paulė Kuzmickienė =

Lithuanian politician

Paulė Kuzmickienė MP
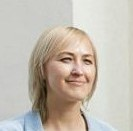

Member of the Seimas
- Incumbent
- Assumed office 26 September 2019
- Preceded by: Aušra Maldeikienė
- Constituency: Žirmūnai

Personal details
- Born: 30 April 1978 (age 48) Utena, Lithuania
- Party: Homeland Union
- Children: 1
- Education: Lithuanian University of Educational Sciences

Paulė Kuzmickienė (born 30 April 1978 in Utena) is a Lithuanian politician, a Member of the Seimas for Žirmūnai constituency. Previous she was a member of Vilnius City Municipal Council.

== Biography ==
In 2005 Kuzmickienė graduated from Lithuanian University of Educational Sciences. She holds a master's degree of Social Sciences (Education Management).

She was an adviser to the Prime Minister on the development of the Vilnius region.

Kuzmickienė is member of the Homeland Union - Lithuanian Christian Democrats. From 2011 to 2019 she was member of Vilnius City Municipal Council.

Elected as Member of the Seimas for Žirmūnai constituency since September 2019.
