= Eugenijus Maldeikis =

Lithuanian politician (born 1958)

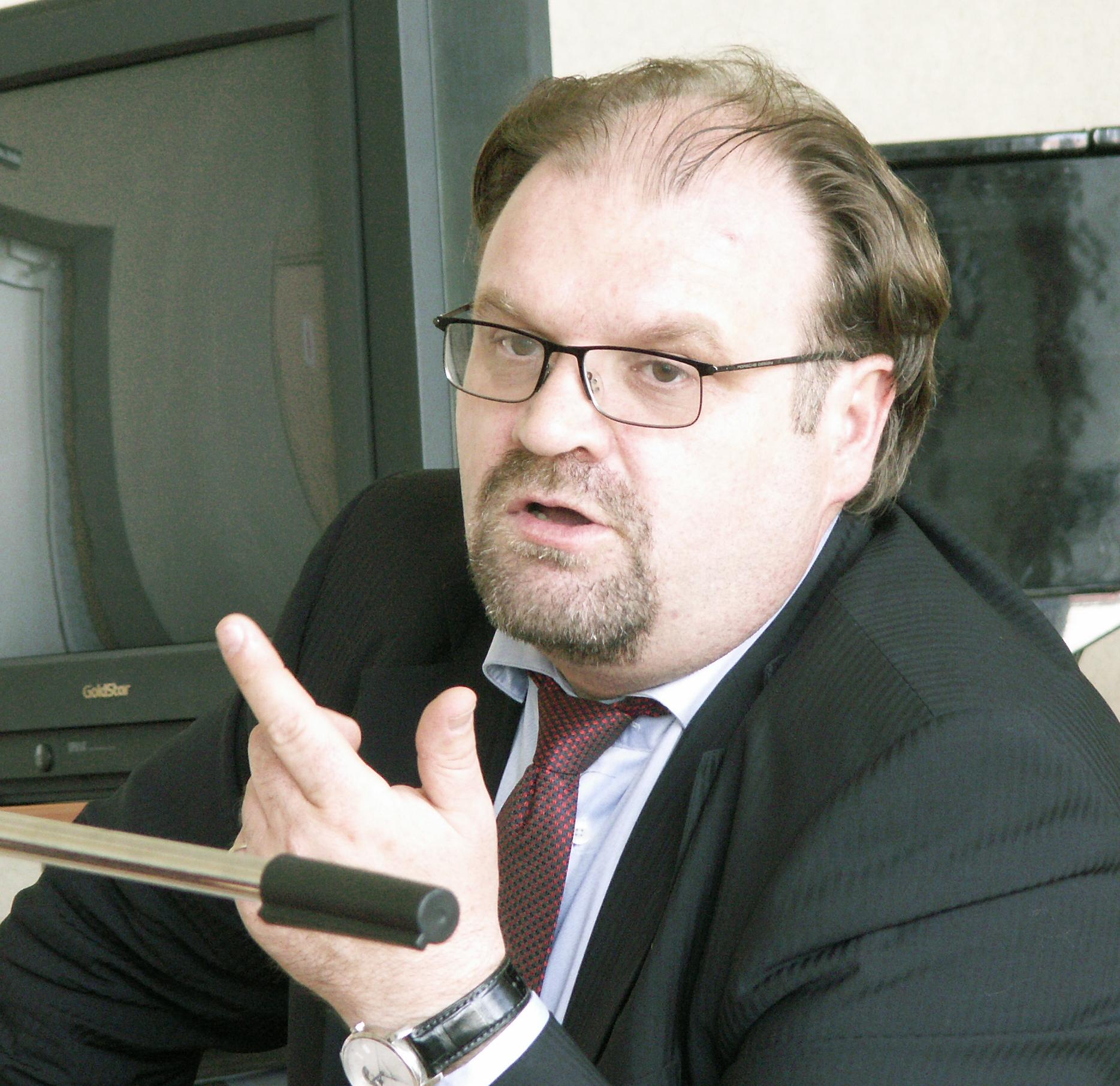

Personal details
- Born: August 27, 1958 (age 66)
- Spouse: Aušra Maldeikienė

Eugenijus Maldeikis (born 27 August 1958, in Anykščiai) is a Lithuanian politician.

Maldeikis served twice as Lithuanian Minister of Economy, during Paksas Cabinet I in 1999, and as part of Paksas Cabinet II from 2000 to 2001. His second stint as economics minister overlapped with his tenure on the Eighth Seimas of Lithuania which began in 2000. From 2003, the Seimas appointed Maldeikis a Lithuanian observer to the European Union. After the death of Rolandas Pavilionis, Maldeikis replaced him as a member of the European Parliament from 18 May 2006 until 2009. While serving on the European Parliament, Maldeikis represented the Lithuanian Liberal Democratic Party within the Union for Europe of the Nations parliamentary group.

Eugenijus Maldeikis was married to Aušra Maldeikienė, who served on the Seimas from 2016 to 2019, when she was elected to the European Parliament. Their firstborn son Matas Maldeikis was elected to the Seimas in 2020.
