= Viktoras Fiodorovas =

Lithuanian politician (born 1987)

Member of the Seimas
- Incumbent
- Assumed office 13 November 2020
- In office 16 November 2012 – 14 November 2016

Personal details
- Born: 29 January 1987 (age 39)
- Party: Independent (since 2024)
- Other political affiliations: DP (until 2008, 2013–2024); LP (2008–2013)

Viktoras Fiodorovas (born 29 January 1987) is a Lithuanian politician. He has been a member of the Seimas since 2020, having previously served from 2012 to 2016. He was a member of the Labour Party until 2024, and was re-elected as an independent candidate in the 2024 parliamentary election.
