= Matas Maldeikis =

Lithuanian politician

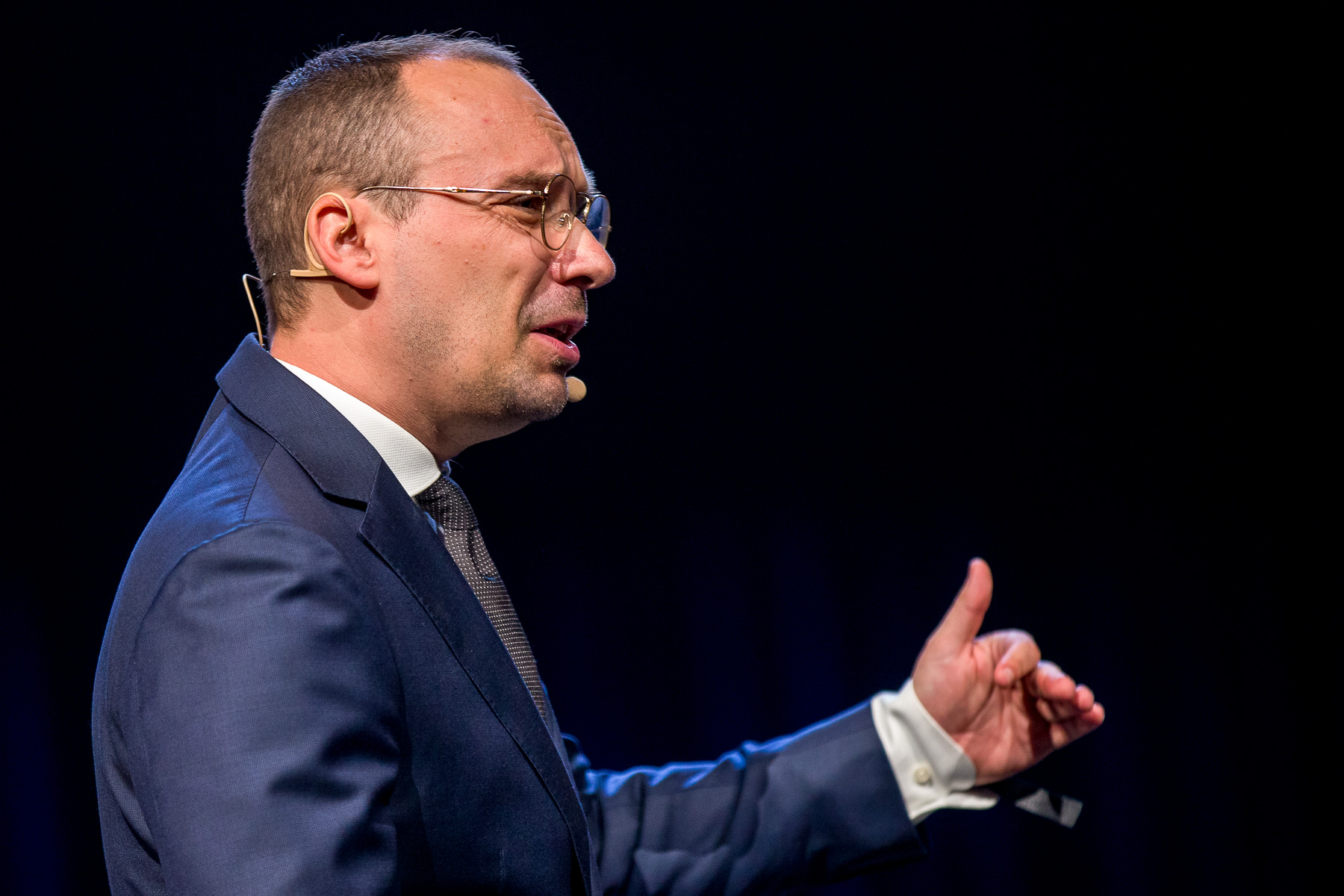

Member of the Seimas
- Incumbent
- Assumed office 13 November 2020

Personal details
- Born: June 19, 1980 (age 46) Vilnius, Lithuania
- Party: Homeland Union
- Parents: Eugenijus Maldeikis (father); Aušra Maldeikienė (mother)
- Education: VMU (2002); VU BS (2006)

Matas Maldeikis (born June 19, 1980) is a Lithuanian politician.

He was elected to the Seimas for the first time in 2020, via the Homeland Union party list. While serving on the Seimas, Maldeikis chaired the Lithuanian Parliamentary Group for Relations with Taiwan.

== Biography ==
Maldeikis was born to Eugenijus Maldeikis and Aušra Maldeikienė, who both served on the Seimas.

In 2002, he completed a Bachelor's degree in Political Science at Vytautas Magnus University. In 2006, he earned a Master’s degree in Management and Business Administration from the Vilnius University International Business School.

From 2006 to 2010, he worked at the Vilnius County Governor's Administration, where he headed the International Cooperation and Public Relations Department.

From 2010 to 2016, he worked at the Seimas Committee on European Affairs. From 2016 to 2020, he worked in Brussels as the permanent representative of the Seimas to the European Union.

In the 2020 parliamentary elections, he was elected to the Seimas. He served on the Budget and Finance Committee, the Committee on European Affairs, and the Future Committee, and from 2021 he was Deputy Chair of the Future Committee.

In the 2024 parliamentary term, he serves on the Committee on Human Rights, the Future Committee, and the Energy Commission. He is the Chair of the Seimas Group on State Efficiency and Artificial Intelligence.

== Bibliography ==
- The History of the End of the World (2022)
