= Mindaugas Lingė =

Lithuanian politician (born 1981)

Member of the Seimas
- Incumbent
- Assumed office 13 November 2020
- Preceded by: Virginijus Sinkevičius
- Constituency: Šeškinė–Šnipiškės

Personal details
- Born: 18 November 1981 (age 44) Rietavas, Lithuanian SSR
- Party: Homeland Union
- Education: Vilnius University

Mindaugas Lingė (born 18 November 1981) is a Lithuanian politician of the Homeland Union. Since 2020, he has been a member of the Seimas. In 2022, he was elected chair of the budget and finance committee. In 2024, he was elected parliamentary leader of the Homeland Union.

== Early life and career ==
Lingė was born in Rietavas in 1981, and graduated from Vilnius University in 2007. He was as an advisor to president Valdas Adamkus from 2006 to 2009, and an advisor to president Dalia Grybauskaitė from 2009 to 2019.
