= Ruslanas Baranovas =

Lithuanian politician (born 1991)

Member-elect of the Seimas
- Incumbent
- Assumed office TBD

Personal details
- Born: 5 April 1991 (age 35)
- Party: Social Democratic Party

Ruslanas Baranovas (born 5 April 1991) is a Lithuanian politician of the Social Democratic Party who was elected as a member of the Seimas in the 2024 parliamentary election. He previously served as a municipal councillor of the Vilnius District Municipality.
