= Vilnius University Business School =

Coordinates: 54°43′30″N 25°20′11″E

- Vilniaus universiteto Verslo Mokykla
- Former names: International Business School at Vilnius University
- Type: Public
- Established: 1989
- Affiliations: CEEMAN, EFMD
- Director: Birutė Miškinienė
- Undergraduates: 1700 (2011)
- Postgraduates: 300 (2011)
- Location: Vilnius, Lithuania
- Website: https://www.vm.vu.lt/

Vilnius University Business School or VU BS (Lithuanian: Vilniaus universiteto Verslo mokykla) is the first business school in Lithuania.

== About VU BS ==
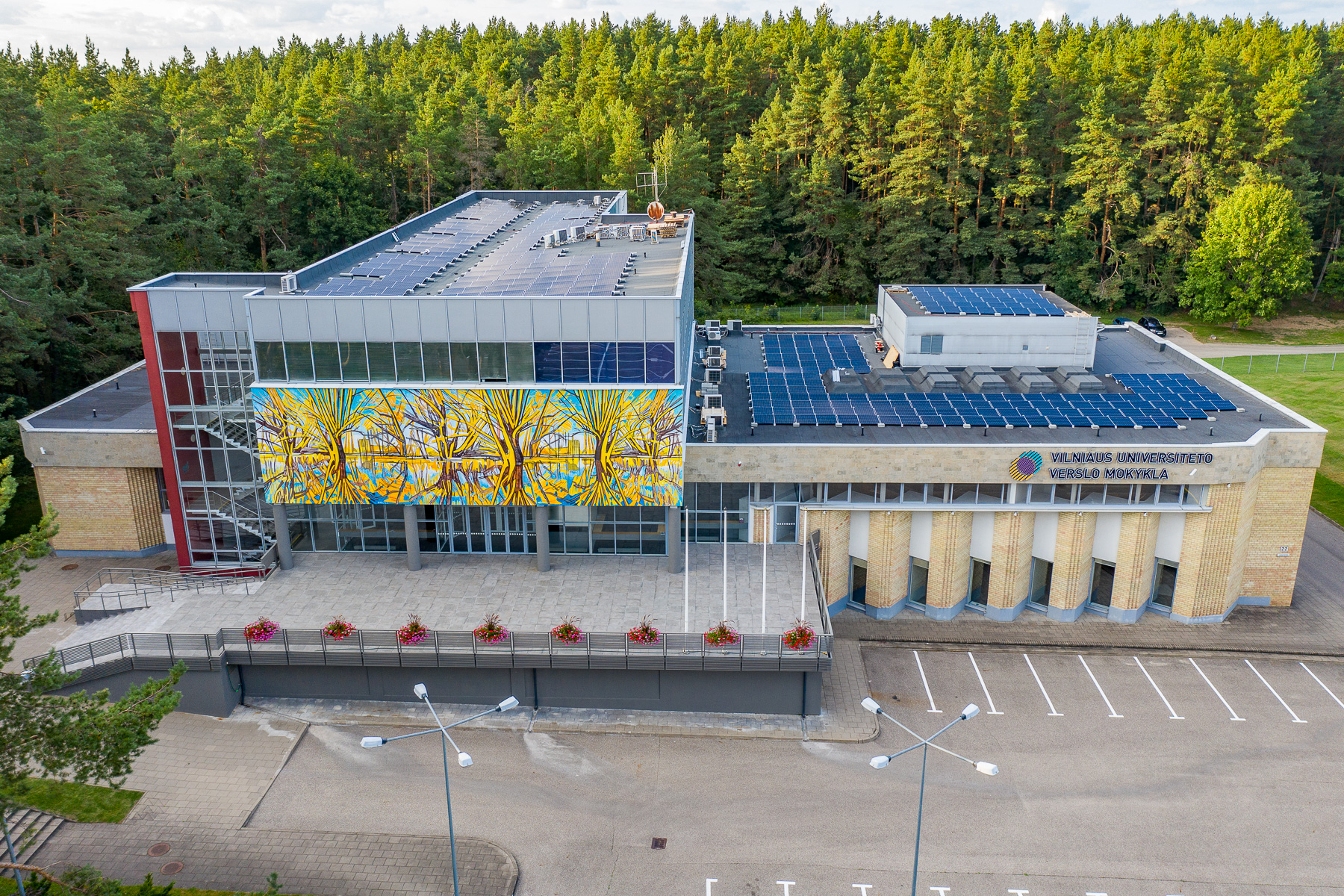
VU Business School main building

VU Business School provides nationally accredited undergraduate, graduate, MBA Entrepreneurship level study programmes, executive education for companies, Entrepreneurial academy for kids, science and business cooperation projects. International academic community successfully applying experiential, team building, online, storytelling and other innovative teaching methods. Business school has a very practical approach on entrepreneurship philosophy learning by doing.

Vision

Business school for stronger Vilnius university in Europe, creating disruptive innovations for business and developing entrepreneurship ecosystem.

Mission

To educate socially responsible entrepreneurial mindset people creating global change

Values

Responsibility I Innovation I Creativity I Entrepreneurship

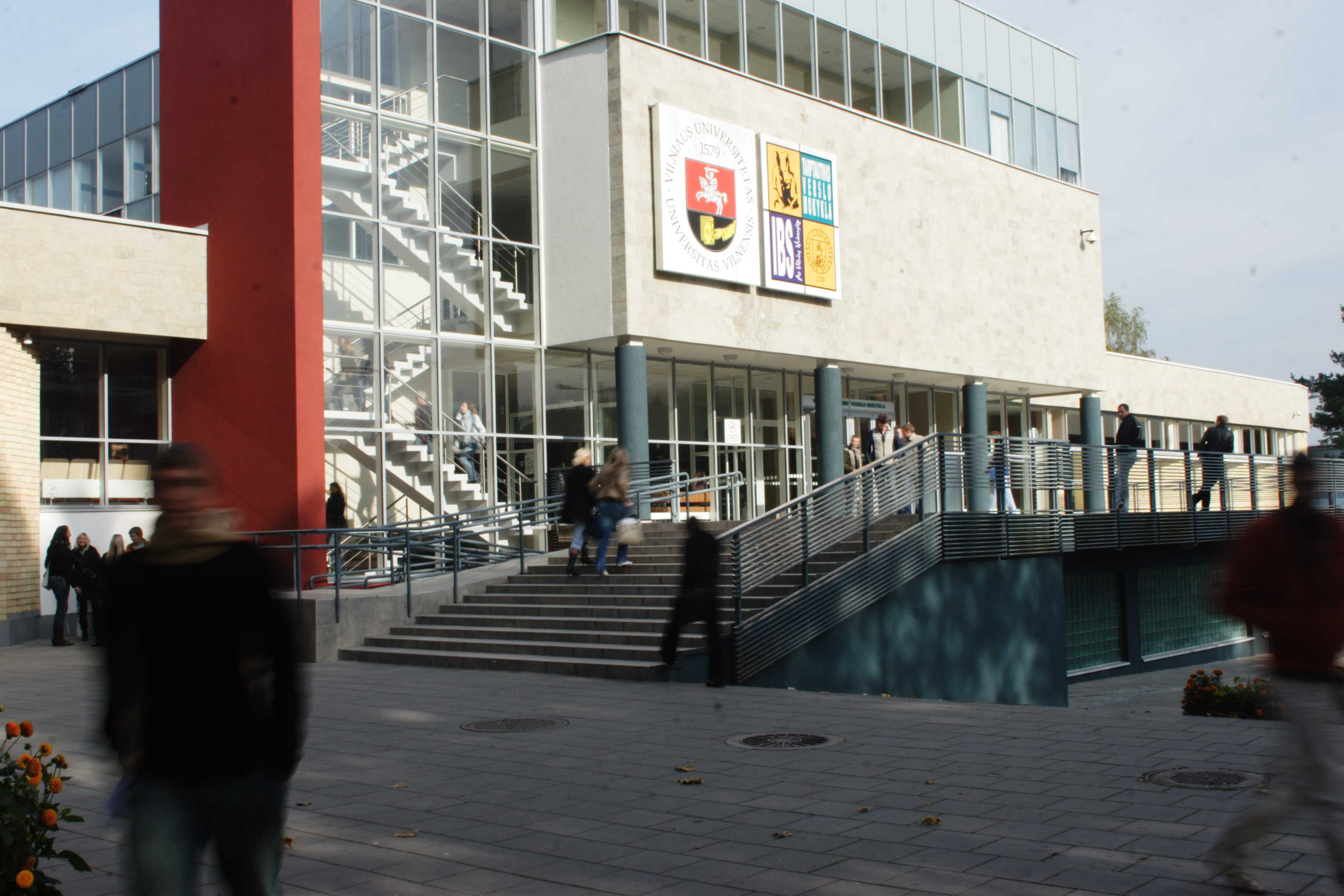
IBS at Vilnius University

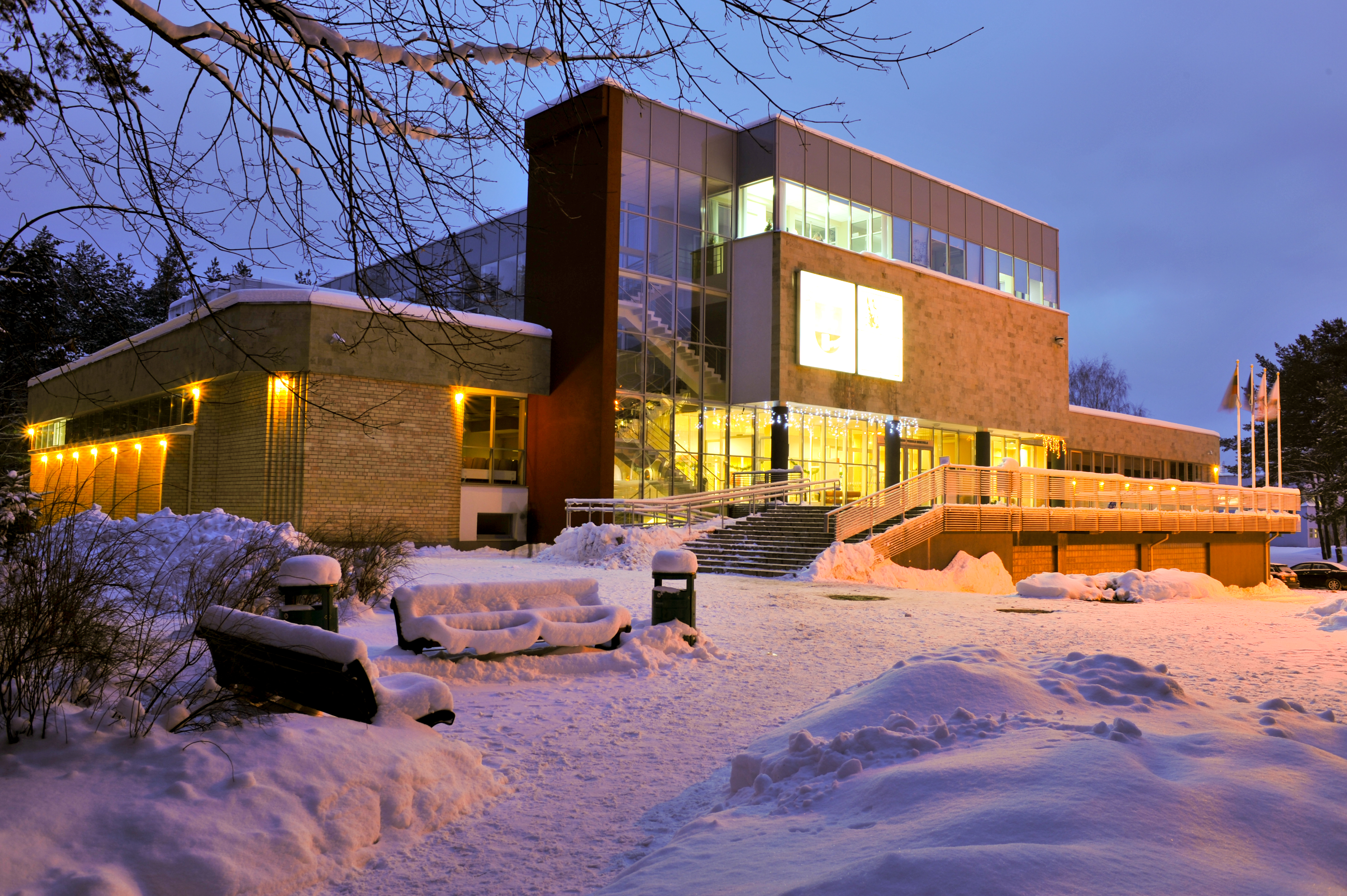
in winter...

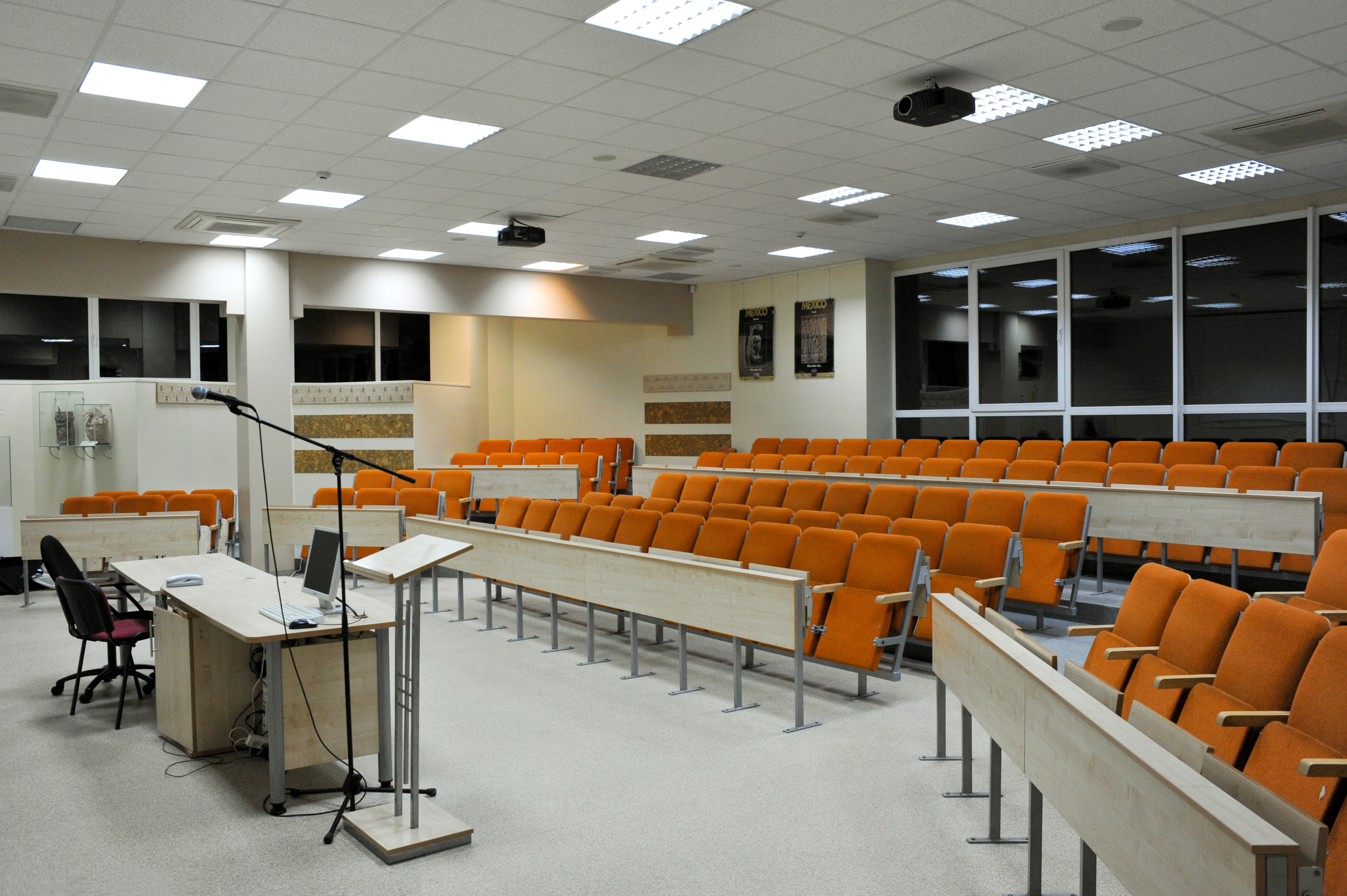
Classroom

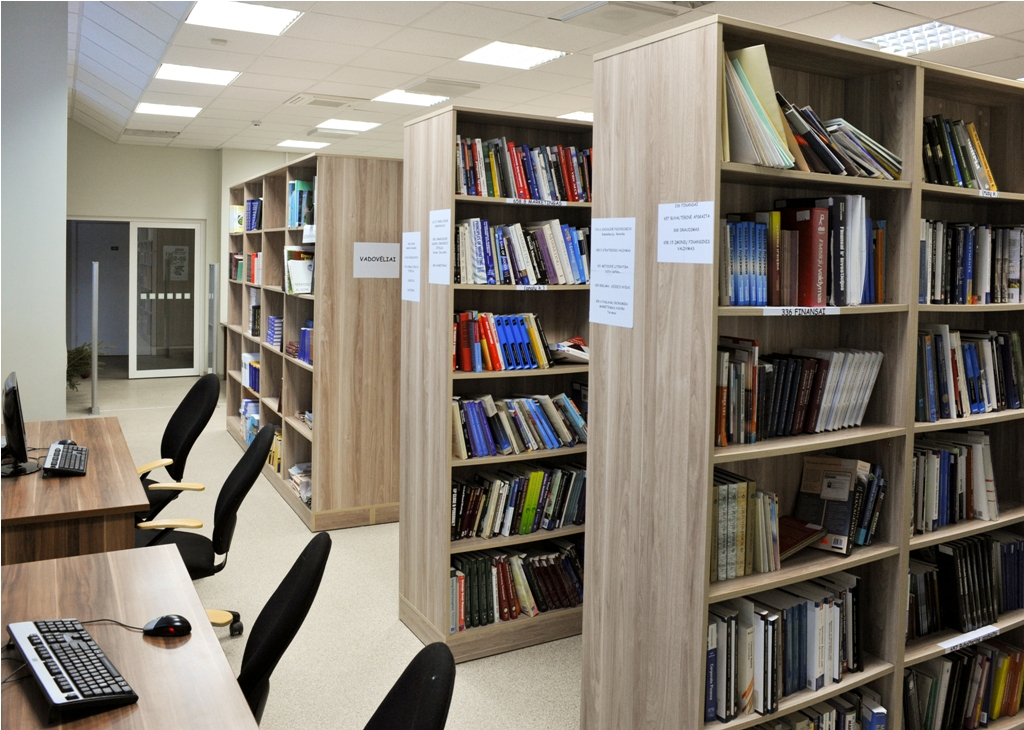
Library

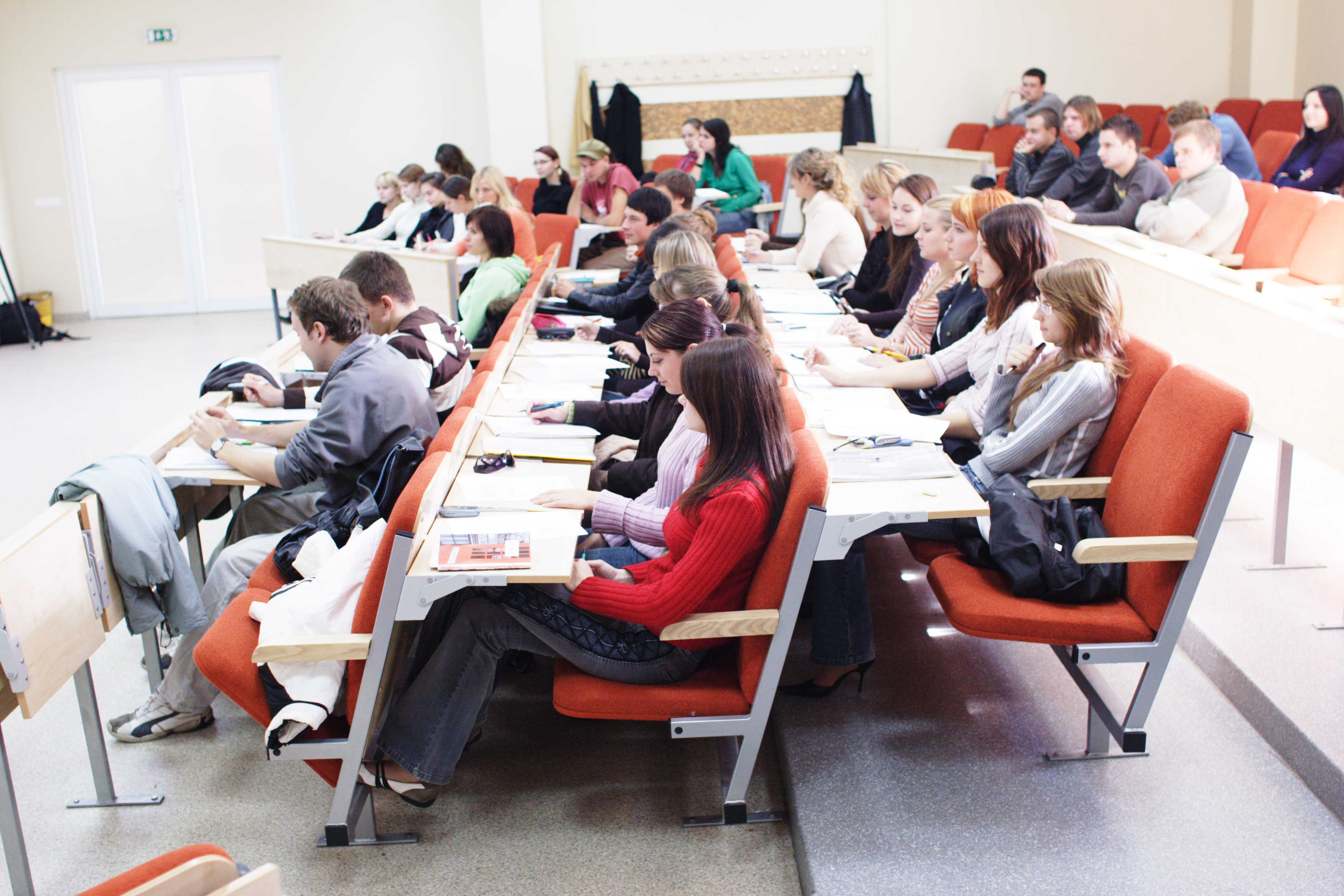
BSc students

== History ==
The founder of BS is Vilnius University. Vilnius University was founded in 1579 and functioned as the only school of higher learning in Lithuania for many years.

- 1989 − International Business School was established as a subdivision of Vilnius University. Departments of International Economic Relations and Management are founded.
- 1996 − studies for bachelor's and master's degrees commenced.
- 2000 − Independent Vilnius University International Business School was established.
- 2003 − status of public institution was confirmed (was registered in juridical entities' register in 2004).
- 2004 − International Business School moved to a new building.
- 2016 - Vilnius University has internally integrated Business School under a new name.
