= Central Electoral Commission (Lithuania) =

Lithuanian Central Electoral Commission
- Vyriausioji rinkimų komisija

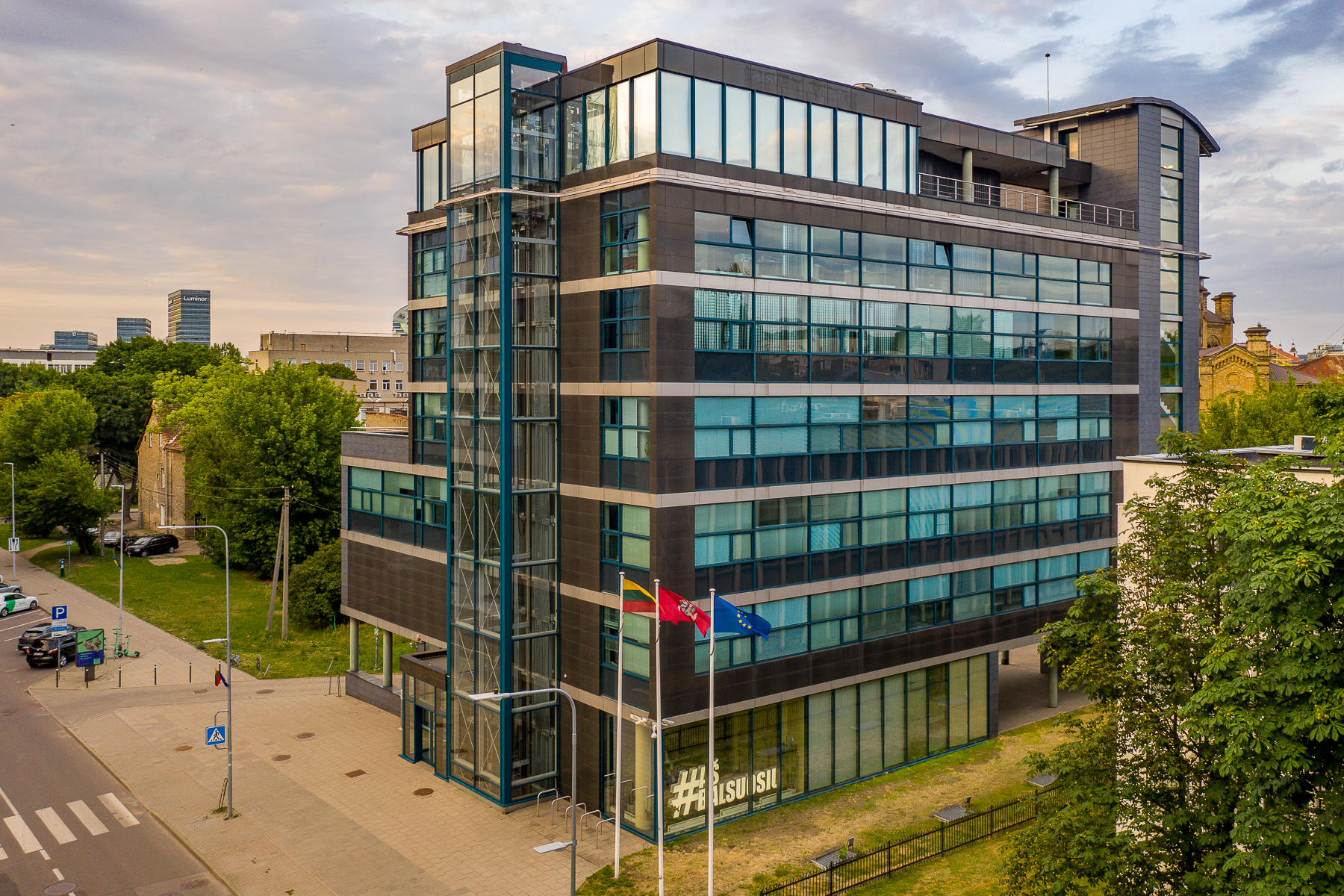
- Headquarters of the Central Electoral Commission

National election commission overview
- Formed: Original: 1919; Current: 25 October 1992; 33 years ago
- Jurisdiction: Lithuania
- Headquarters: Gynėjų g. 8, LT-01109, Vilnius, Lithuania
- Employees: 75
- National election commission executive: Lina Petronienė, Chairwoman
- Website: vrk.lt

The Central Electoral Commission or VRK (Lithuanian: Vyriausioji rinkimų komisija) is an independent agency of the Government of Lithuania and a permanent commission for the organisation and conduct of elections and referendums in the Republic of Lithuania.

== Official duties ==
The duties of the Chief Electoral Commission encompass the organisation and conduct of elections to the Seimas of the Republic of Lithuania, the President of the Republic of Lithuania, municipal councils, elections to the European Parliament and referendums. To guarantee that elections and referendums are conducted in accordance with the principles of democratic elections enshrined in the Constitution of the Republic of Lithuania and the laws of the Republic of Lithuania, and to ensure the consistent application of the laws on elections and referendums throughout the territory of the Republic of Lithuania.

== History ==
By the end of 1919, Lithuania's domestic and foreign situation had stabilised. The foundations for the elections to the Constituent Seimas were laid. On 16 June 1919, a commission was set up to draft a law on the election of the Constituent Seimas. The law governing the first parliamentary elections was drafted and adopted on 30 October 1919. The legal basis for the first democratic elections in modern Lithuania was thus established.

On 10 December 1919, the first institution responsible for organising and conducting the elections to the Constituent Assembly was officially established - the Central Electoral Commission. The first chairman of the Commission was Petras Leonas (1922-1933), a well-known lawyer, Minister of Justice in the 1st and 2nd Cabinets, later Minister of the Interior in the 4th Cabinet, and the following were appointed as members of the Commission: Judge Vladas Mačys, a priest and a signatory of the Act of February 16th, Kazimieras Šaulys, a Jewish minority representative, lawyer Leyb Gorfinkel, and a Polish minority representative, lawyer Aloyzas Bžozovskis.

Following the restoration of Lithuania's independence, the fundamental principles of electoral organisation and conduct were reinstituted, albeit with notable modifications compared to the interwar era. Article 701 of the Law of the Republic of Lithuania, titled "On Amendments and Additions to the Temporary Basic Law of the Republic of Lithuania and on the Change of the Name of the Supreme State Authority of the Republic of Lithuania", specifies that elections must be conducted by the electoral commission, which is to be composed of representatives from political parties and public political associations. In the same year, the Supreme Council – Reconstituent Seimas, by Resolution, established the Central Electoral Commission of the Republic of Lithuania for a second time.
