= List of governments of Lithuania since 1990 =

The list gives the composition of the governments of the Republic of Lithuania from 1990 to 15 December 2016.The Government is the cabinet of Lithuania, proposed by the President and confirmed by the Seimas (parliament).

In 1990, Lithuania declared independence from the Soviet Union and has since been a democratic republic. All citizens elect the Seimas for a four-year term. The most recent elections took place in October 2016.

== Governments ==
Ministry	1st Government March 17, 1990 January 10, 1991	2nd Government January 10, 1991 January 13, 1991	3rd Government January 13, 1991 July 21, 1992
Prime Minister	Kazimiera Prunskienė	Albertas Šimėnas	Gediminas Vagnorius
Foreign Affairs	Algirdas Saudargas		
The Interior	Marijonas Misiukonis		Petras Valiukas
Defence			Audrius Butkevičius
Finance	Romualdas Sikorskis		Elvyra Kunevičienė
Economy	Vytas Navickas		Vytas Navickas, Albertas Šimėnas
Energy	Vaidotas Ašmantas		
Industry	Rimvydas Jasinavičius		
Trade	Albertas Sinevičius		Albertas Sinevičius, Vilius Židonis
Natural Resources	Romualdas Kozyrovičius		
Agriculture	Vytautas Knašys		Rimvydas Survila
Forestry	Vaidotas Antanaitis		Vaidotas Antanaitis, Jonas Klimas
Justice	Pranas Kūris		Vytautas Pakalniškis
Health Care	Juozas Olekas		
Social Security	Algis Dobrovolskas		
Culture and Education	Darius Kuolys		
Transportation	Jonas Biržiškis		
Communications	Kostas Birulis		Kostas Birulis, Alfredas Basevičius
Construction and Urban Development	Algimantas Nasvytis		
International Economic Relations			Vytenis Aleškaitis
Without Portfolio			Aleksandras Abišala
Ministry	4th Government July 21, 1992 November 26, 1992	5th Government December 12, 1992 March 10, 1993	6th Government March 10, 1993 February 8, 1996
Prime Minister	Aleksandras Abišala	Bronislovas Lubys	Adolfas Šleževičius
Foreign Affairs	Algirdas Saudargas	Povilas Gylys	
The Interior	Petras Valiukas	Romasis Vaitiekūnas	
Defence	Audrius Butkevičius		Audrius Butkevičius, Linas Linkevičius
Finance	Audrius Misevičius	Eduardas Vilkelis	Eduardas Vilkelis, Reinoldijus Šarkinas
Economy	Albertas Šimėnas	Julius Veselka	Julius Veselka, Aleksandras Vasiliauskas, Vytas Navickas
Energy	Vaidotas Ašmantas		Algimantas Stasiukynas, Kostas Leščinskas
Trade and Natural Resources	Romualdas Ramoška	Albertas Sinevičius	Albertas Sinevičius, Kazimieras Klimašauskas
Agriculture	Rimvydas Survila	Rimantas Karazija	Rimantas Karazija, Vytautas Einoris
Forestry	Jonas Klimas		Gintautas Kovalčikas, Albertas Vasilauskas
Environmental Protection			Bronius Bradauskas
Justice	Zenonas Juknevičius	Jonas Prapiestis	
Health Care	Juozas Olekas	Vytautas Kriauza	Jurgis Brėdikis, Antanas Vinkus
Social Security	Teodoras Medaiskis		Teodoras Medaiskis, Laurynas Stankevičius, Mindaugas Mikaila
Culture and Education	Darius Kuolys	Dainius Trinkūnas	Dainius Trinkūnas, Juozas Nekrošius
Education and Science			Vladislavas Domarkas
Transportation	Jonas Biržiškis		
Communications and Information Technology	Gintautas Žintelis		
Construction and Urban Development	Algimantas Nasvytis	Algirdas Vapšys	Algirdas Vapšys, Julius Laiconas
International Economic Relations	Vytenis Aleškaitis		
Public Administration Reforms and Local Authorities			Laurynas Stankevičius
Without Portfolio	Leonas Kadžiulis, Stasys Kropas	Algimantas Matulevičius	
Ministry	7th Government February 23, 1996 November 19, 1996	8th Government December 4, 1996 May 2, 1999	9th Government June 1, 1999 October 27, 1999
Prime Minister	Laurynas Stankevičius	Gediminas Vagnorius	Rolandas Paksas
Foreign Affairs	Povilas Gylys	Algirdas Saudargas	
The Interior	Virgilijus Bulovas	Vidmantas Žiemelis, Stasys Šedbaras	Česlovas Blažys
Defence	Linas Linkevičius	Česlovas Stankevičius	
Finance	Algimantas Križinauskas	Rolandas Matiliauskas, Algirdas Šemeta	Jonas Lionginas
Economy	Antanas Kaminskas	Vincas Babilius	Eugenijus Maldeikis
Energy	Saulius Kutas		
Industry and Trade	Kazimieras Klimašauskas	Laima Andrikienė	
Agriculture	Vytautas Einoris	Vytautas Knašys, Edvardas Makelis	Edvardas Makelis
Forestry	Albertas Vasiliauskas		
Environmental Protection	Bronius Bradauskas	Imantas Lazdinis, Algis Čaplikas, Danius Lygis	Danius Lygis
Justice	Jonas Prapiestis, Albertas Valys	Vytautas Pakalniškis	Gintaras Balčiūnas
Health Care	Antanas Vinkus	Juozas Galdikas, Mindaugas Stankevičius	Raimundas Alekna
Social Security and Labour	Mindaugas Mikaila	Irena Degutienė	
Culture	Juozas Nekrošius	Saulius Šaltenis	Arūnas Bėkšta
Education and Science	Vladislavas Domarkas	Zigmas Zinkevičius, Kornelijus Platelis	Kornelijus Platelis
Transportation	Jonas Biržiškis	Algis Žvaliauskas, Rimantas Didžiokas	Rimantas Didžiokas
Communications and Information Technology	Vaidotas Abraitis	Rimantas Pleikys	
Construction and Urban Development	Aldona Baranauskienė	Algis Čaplikas	
European Affairs		Laima Andrikienė	
Public Administration Reforms and Local Authorities	Petras Papovas	Kęstutis Skrebys	Sigitas Kaktys
Ministry	10th Government November 3, 1999 November 9, 2000	11th Government October 27, 2000 June 20, 2001	12th Government July 4, 2001 December 15, 2004
Prime Minister	Andrius Kubilius	Rolandas Paksas	Algirdas Brazauskas
Foreign Affairs	Algirdas Saudargas	Antanas Valionis	
The Interior	Česlovas Blažys	Vytautas Markevičius	Juozas Bernatonis, Virgilijus Bulovas
National Defence	Česlovas Stankevičius	Linas Linkevičius	
Finance	Vytautas Dudėnas	Jonas Lionginas	Dalia Grybauskaitė, Algirdas Butkevičius
Economy	Valentinas Milaknis	Eugenijus Maldeikis, Eugenijus Gentvilas	Petras Čėsna
Agriculture	Edvardas Makelis	Kęstutis Kristinaitis	Kęstutis Kristinaitis, Jeronimas Kraujelis
Environment	Danius Lygis	Henrikas Žukauskas	Arūnas Kundrotas
Justice	Gintaras Balčiūnas	Gintautas Bartkus	Vytautas Markevičius
Health Care	Raimundas Alekna	Vinsas Janušonis, Konstantinas Dobrovolskis	Konstantinas Dobrovolskis, Juozas Olekas
Social Security and Labour	Irena Degutienė	Vilija Blinkevičiūtė	
Culture	Arūnas Bėkšta	Gintautas Kėvišas	Roma Dovydėnienė
Education and Science	Kornelijus Platelis	Algirdas Monkevičius	
Transport and Communications	Rimantas Didžiokas	Gintaras Striaukas, Dailis Barakauskas	Zigmantas Balčytis
Public Administration Reforms and Local Authorities	Jonas Rudalevičius		
Ministry	13th Government November 29, 2004 June 1, 2006	14th Government July 18, 2006 December 4, 2008	15th Government December 4, 2008 December 12, 2012
Prime Minister	Algirdas Brazauskas	Gediminas Kirkilas	Andrius Kubilius
Foreign Affairs	Antanas Valionis	Petras Vaitiekūnas	Vygaudas Ušackas, Audronius Ažubalis
The Interior	Gintaras Furmanavičius	Raimondas Šukys, Regimantas Čiupaila	Raimundas Palaitis, Artūras Melianas
National Defence	Gediminas Kirkilas	Juozas Olekas	Rasa Juknevičienė
Finance	Algirdas Butkevičius, Zigmantas Balčytis	Zigmantas Balčytis, Rimantas Šadžius	Algirdas Šemeta, Ingrida Šimonytė
Economy	Viktoras Uspaskich, Kęstutis Daukšys	Vytas Navickas	Dainius Kreivys, Rimantas Žylius
Agriculture	Kazimiera Prunskienė		Kazimieras Starkevičius
Environment	Arūnas Kundrotas	Arūnas Kundrotas, Artūras Paulauskas	Gediminas Kazlauskas
Justice	Gintautas Bužinskas	Petras Baguška	Remigijus Šimašius
Health	Žilvinas Padaiga	Rimvydas Turčinskas, Gediminas Černiauskas	Algis Čaplikas, Raimondas Šukis
Social Security and Labour	Vilija Blinkevičiūtė		Rimantas Jonas Dagys, Donatas Jankauskas
Culture	Vladimiras Prudnikovas	Jonas Jučas	Remigijus Vilkaitis, Arūnas Gelūnas
Education and Science	Remigijus Motuzas	Roma Žakaitienė, Algirdas Monkevičius	Gintaras Steponavičius
Transport and Communications	Zigmantas Balčytis, Petras Čėsna	Algirdas Butkevičius	Eligijus Masiulis
Energy			Arvydas Sekmokas
Ministry	16th Government December 12, 2012 December 13, 2016	17th Government December 13, 2016 December 11, 2020	18th Government December 11, 2020 Present
Prime Minister	Algirdas Butkevičius	Saulius Skvernelis	Ingrida Šimonytė
Foreign Affairs	Linas Antanas Linkevičius		Gabrielius Landsbergis
The Interior	Dailis Alfonsas Barakauskas, Saulius Skvernelis, Tomas Žilinskas	Eimutis Misiūnas, Rita Tamašunienė	Agnė Bilotaitė
National Defence	Juozas Olekas	Raimundas Karoblis	Arvydas Anušauskas
Finance	Rimantas Šadžius, Rasa Budbergytė	Vilius Šapoka	Gintarė Skaistė
Economy	Birutė Vėsaitė, Evaldas Gustas	Mindaugas Sinkevičius, Virginijus Sinkevičius, Rimantas Sinkevičius	Aušrinė Armonaitė
Agriculture	Vigilijus Jukna, Virginija Baltraitienė	Bronius Markauskas, Andrius Palionis	Kęstutis Navickas
Environment	Valentinas Mazuronis, Kęstutis Trečiokas	Kęstutis Navickas, Kęstutis Mažeika	Simonas Gentvilas
Justice	Juozas Bernatonis	Milda Vainiutė, Elvinas Jankevičius	Ewelina Dobrowolska
Health	Vytenis Andriukaitis, Rimantė Šalaševičiūtė, Juras Požela	Aurelijus Veryga	Arūnas Dulkys
Social Security and Labour	Algimanta Pabedinskienė	Linas Kukuraitis	Monika Navickienė
Culture	Šarūnas Birutis	Liana Ruokytė-Jonsson, Mindaugas Kvietkauskas	Simonas Kairys
Education and Science	Dainius Pavalkis, Audronė Pitrėnienė	Jurgita Petrauskienė, Algirdas Monkevičius	Jurgita Šiugždinienė
Transport and Communications	Rimantas Sinkevičius	Rokas Masiulis, Jaroslav Narkevič	Marius Skuodis
Energy	Jaroslav Neverovič, Rokas Masiulis	Žygimantas Vaičiūnas	Dainius Kreivys

== See also ==
- List of governments of Lithuania (1918–1940)
