= Kirkilas Cabinet =

- 2006–2008
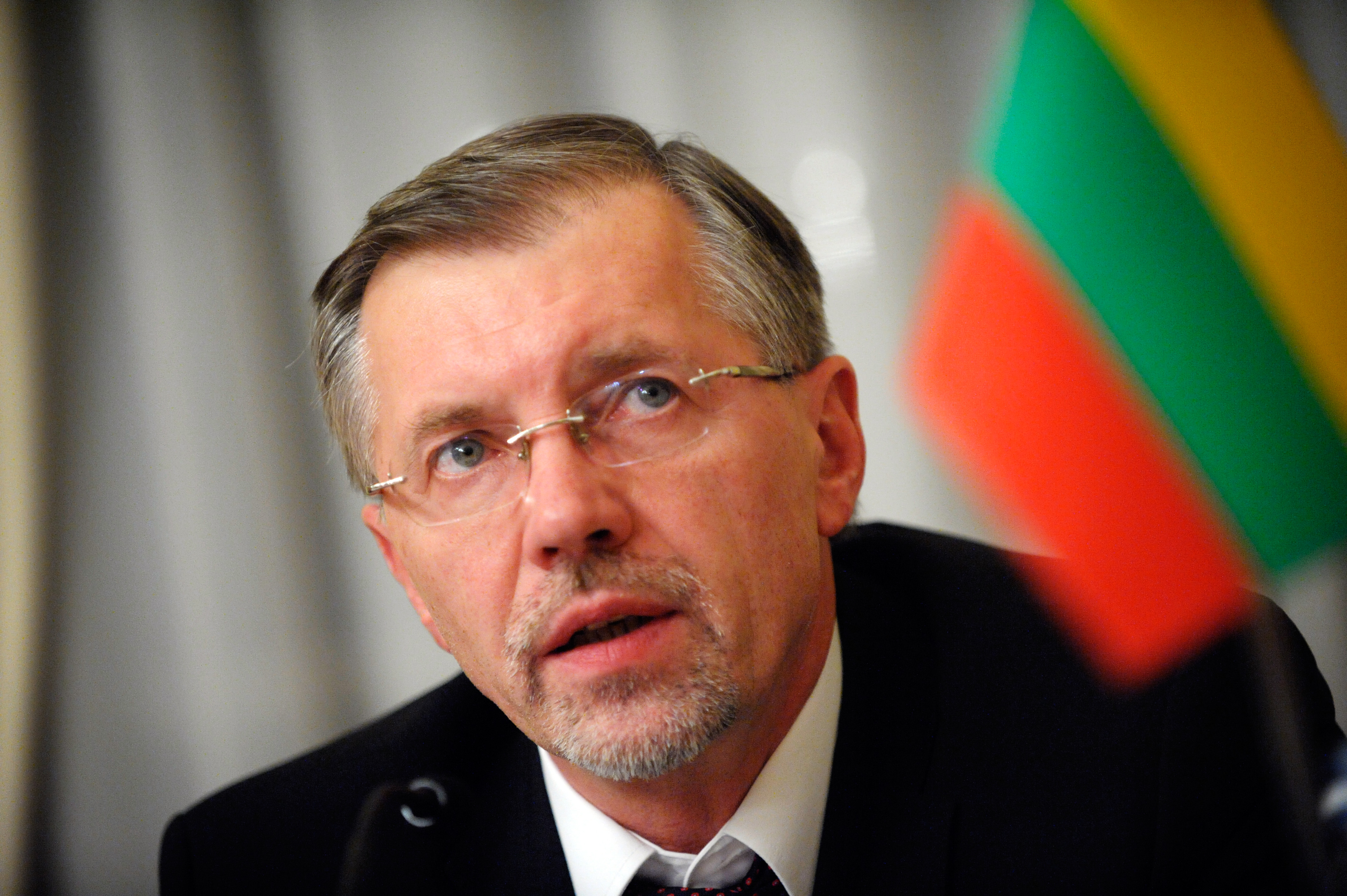
- Date formed: 6 July 2006
- Date dissolved: 9 December 2008

People and organisations
- Head of state: Valdas Adamkus
- Head of government: Gediminas Kirkilas
- Member parties: Social Democratic Party of Lithuania; Lithuanian Peasant Popular Union; Civic Democratic Party; Liberal and Centre Union; New Union (Social Liberals) (2008)
- Status in legislature: Minority coalition government (2006–2007) with Homeland Union (Lithuanian Conservatives) confidence & supply Majority coalition government (2008)
- Opposition parties: Homeland Union (Lithuanian Conservatives); Labour Party; Order and Justice; New Union (Social Liberals) (2006–2007); Liberal Movement
- Opposition leader: None

History
- Legislature term: Ninth Seimas
- Predecessor: Brazauskas Cabinet II
- Successor: Kubilius Cabinet II

The Kirkilas Cabinet was the 14th cabinet of Lithuania since 1990. It consisted of the Prime Minister and 13 government ministers from the Social Democratic Party, Lithuanian Peasant Popular Union, Civic Democratic Party (which split from the Labour Party), and the Liberal and Centre Union. The minority government survived due to confidence and supply from the Homeland Union. The New Union (Social Liberals) joined the coalition in 2008, making it a majority government.

== History ==
=== Formation ===
Parliamentary groups in parliament by 1 July 2006

Algirdas Brazauskas resigned as the Prime Minister of the 13th government on 1 June 2006. After this event, the Homeland Union, the Liberal Movement and the New Union (Social Liberals) tried to form a ruling coalition (which was called the "Coalition of Breakthrough") on their own, but the Social Democratic Party of Lithuania and the Lithuanian Peasant Popular Union also tried to form a government at the same time. The attempt by the latter two parties was successful and the new coalition also included the Civic Democratic Party and the Liberal and Centre Union.

After the interim Prime Minister, Zigmantas Balčytis failed to gather sufficient level of support in the parliament (only 53 members of the parliament belonged to new four party coalition), the President Valdas Adamkus appointed Gediminas Kirkilas of the Social Democratic Party of Lithuania Prime Minister on 6 July 2006. Although the possibility of snap elections to the Seimas in 2007 was raised by spring and summer of 2006, the 14th cabinet received its mandate and started work on 18 July 2006 after the Seimas gave assent to its program (the main opposition party – the Homeland Union – abstained in the voting).

=== Minority and majority governments ===
The government served as a minority government from July 2006 to January 2008. The confidence and supply agreement between the Social Democratic Party of Lithuania and the Homeland Union had fixed terms of six months, which could be extended for six months at a time. By the end of 2007, Homeland Union withdrew its support for the minority government and the search for new partnerships with other parties began. In January 2008, the coalition became a majority government when the New Union (Social Liberals) joined after weeks of negotiations, although the party had already agreed to support the minority government in April 2007.

The government continued to serve until the end of the term of the Ninth Seimas, returning its mandate on 17 November 2008, soon after the elections to the Seimas in October. The government continued to serve in an acting capacity until the Second Kubilius Cabinet started its work on 9 December 2008.

== Cabinet ==
The following ministers served on Kirkilas Cabinet.

Position	Name	Party	From	To
Prime Minister	Gediminas Kirkilas	Social Democratic Party of Lithuania	18 July 2006	9 December 2008
Ministry of Agriculture	Kazimira Prunskienė	Lithuanian Peasant Popular Union	18 July 2006	9 December 2008
Ministry of Culture	Jonas Jučas	Liberal and Centre Union	18 July 2006	9 December 2008
Ministry of Economy	Vytas Navickas	Independent (endorsed by LVLS)	18 July 2006	9 December 2008
Ministry of Education and Science	Roma Žakaitienė	Social Democratic Party of Lithuania	18 July 2006	27 May 2008
Ministry of Education and Science	Algirdas Monkevičius	New Union (Social Liberals)	27 May 2008	9 December 2008
Ministry of Environment	Arūnas Kundrotas	Social Democratic Party of Lithuania	18 July 2006	31 January 2008
Ministry of Environment	Artūras Paulauskas	New Union (Social Liberals)	31 January 2008	9 December 2008
Ministry of Finance	Zigmantas Balčytis	Social Democratic Party of Lithuania	18 July 2006	16 May 2007
Ministry of Finance	Rimantas Šadžius	Social Democratic Party of Lithuania	16 May 2007	9 December 2008
Ministry of Foreign Affairs	Petras Vaitiekūnas	Independent (endorsed by LVLS)	18 July 2006	9 December 2008
Ministry of Health	Rimvydas Turčinskas	Civic Democratic Party	18 July 2006	14 July 2008
Ministry of Health	Rimvydas Turčinskas	Social Democratic Party of Lithuania	18 July 2006	14 July 2008
Ministry of Health	Gediminas Černiauskas	Social Democratic Party of Lithuania	14 July 2008	9 December 2008
Ministry of the Interior	Raimondas Šukys	Liberal and Centre Union	18 July 2006	10 December 2007
Ministry of the Interior	Regimantas Čiupaila	Liberal and Centre Union	17 December 2007	9 December 2008
Ministry of Justice	Petras Baguška	Civic Democratic Party	18 July 2006	9 December 2008
Ministry of Defence	Juozas Olekas	Social Democratic Party of Lithuania	18 July 2006	9 December 2008
Ministry of Social Security and Labour	Vilija Blinkevičiūtė	Social Democratic Party of Lithuania	18 July 2006	9 December 2008
Ministry of Transport and Communications	Algirdas Butkevičius	Social Democratic Party of Lithuania	18 July 2006	9 December 2008
