= Vagnorius Cabinet I =

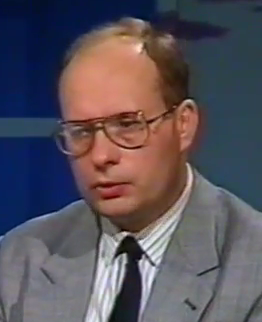
Gediminas Vagnorius, Prime Minister of the cabinet (1996)

The first Vagnorius Cabinet was the 3rd cabinet of Lithuania since the declaration of independence in 1990. It consisted of the Prime Minister and 18 government ministers.

== History ==
The previous government, headed by Albertas Šimėnas, was dismissed by the Supreme Council of Lithuania only three days into its term, after Šimėnas briefly disappeared during the January events. Gediminas Vagnorius was appointed the Prime Minister by the Supreme Council on 13 January 1991.

The government served for more than a year. This mainly was caused by the change of parliament's majority. Prime Minister Gediminas Vagnorius was a member of the United Sąjūdis parliamentary group, whose members by late 1991 and early 1992 gradually switched to other parliamentary groups (e. g. Seventh/Moderates' parliamentary group). This led government to become minority one and the infighting with so-called the 'New Majority' (Lithuanian: naujoji dauguma). Finally Vagnorius resigned on 14 July 1992, which the Supreme Council accepted on 21 July. On the same day, Aleksandras Abišala, who had served as a Minister on the Vagnorius Cabinet, was appointed in his place, heading the Abišala Cabinet.

Vagnorius Cabinet started the reforms necessary to transition into a market economy, including privatization of state assets and collective farms, as well as a currency reform. However, some of the reforms have been criticized as hasty and inefficient and have been blamed for rapid decline in economic activity. In addition, the confrontational style of the Prime Minister led to infighting within the government, as well as with other leaders of the country.

Vagnorius would later return to head another cabinet between 1996 and 1999.

== Cabinet ==
The following ministers served on the first Vagnorius Cabinet.

Position	Name
Deputy Prime Minister	Zigmas Vaišvila
Ministry of Agriculture	Rimvydas Survila
Ministry of Culture and Education	Darius Kuolys
Ministry of Economy	Vytas Navickas
Ministry of Economy	Albertas Šimėnas (from 30 May 1991)
Ministry of Finance	Elvyra Kunevičienė
Ministry of Foreign Affairs	Algirdas Saudargas
Ministry of Health	Juozas Olekas
Ministry of the Interior	Petras Valiukas
Ministry of Justice, Deputy Prime Minister	Vytautas Pakalniškis
Ministry of Defence	Audrius Butkevičius
Ministry of Social Security, Deputy Prime Minister	Algis Dobravolskas
Ministry of Transport and Communications	Jonas Bižiškis
Ministry of Energy	Leonas Ašmantas
Ministry of Forestry	Vaidotas Antanaitis
Ministry of Forestry	Jonas Klimas (from 23 January 1992)
Ministry of International Economic Relations	Vytenis Aleškaitis
Ministry of Trade	Albertas Sinevičius (until 2 December 1991)
Ministry of Industry and Trade	Vilius Židonis (from 3 October 1991)
Ministry of Communications and Informatics	Kostas Birulis
Ministry of Construction and Urbanistics	Algimantas Nasvytis
Minister without portfolio	Aleksandras Abišala
