= Brazauskas Cabinet I =

- 2001–2004
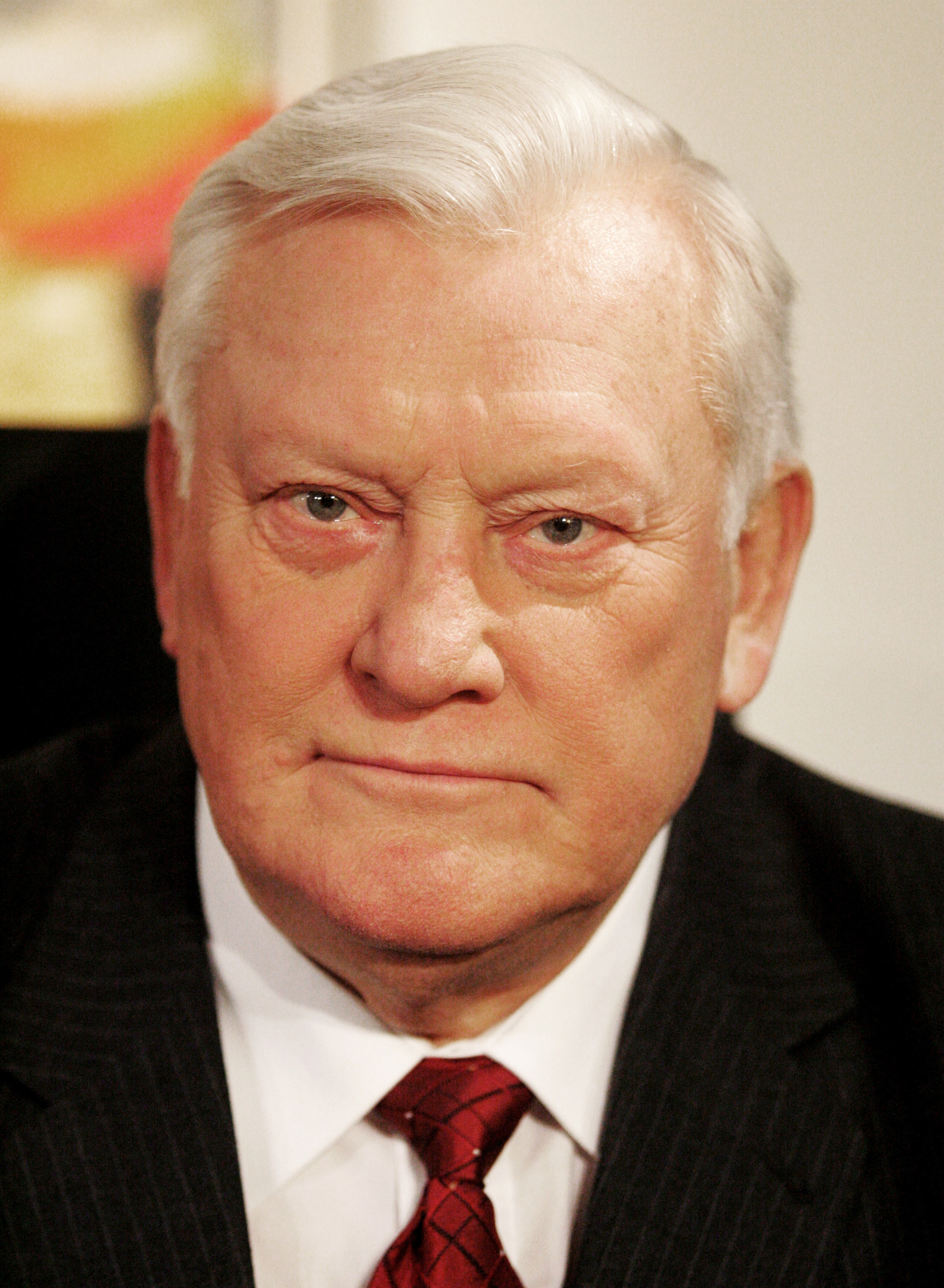
- Date formed: 12 July 2001
- Date dissolved: 14 December 2004

People and organisations
- Head of state: Valdas Adamkus (2001–2003); Rolandas Paksas (2003–2004); Valdas Adamkus (2004)
- Head of government: Algirdas Brazauskas
- Member parties: Social Democratic Party of Lithuania, New Union (Social Liberals)
- Status in legislature: Majority coalition government
- Opposition parties: Liberal Union of Lithuania, Homeland Union, United parliamentary group (Lithuanian Centre Union, Modern Christian-Democratic Union) (2001–2003) Liberal and Centre Union, Homeland Union (2003–2004)
- Opposition leader: Rolandas Paksas (2001) Gintaras Steponavičius (2001–2002)

History
- Legislature term: Eighth Seimas
- Predecessor: Paksas Cabinet II
- Successor: Brazauskas Cabinet II

The First Brazauskas Cabinet was the 12th cabinet of Lithuania since 1990. It consisted of the Prime Minister and 13 government ministers.

== History ==
Algirdas Brazauskas, the leader of the Social Democratic Party of Lithuania, was appointed the Prime Minister by President Valdas Adamkus on 4 July 2001, after the resignation of the previous government of Rolandas Paksas. The 12th cabinet received its mandate and started its work on 12 July 2001, after the Seimas gave assent to its program.

The government served until the end of the term of the Eighth Seimas and returned its mandate on 15 November 2004, after the elections in October. The government continued to serve in an acting capacity until the new government (also headed by Brazauskas) started its work on 14 December 2004.

== Cabinet ==
The following ministers served on the First Brazauskas Cabinet.

Position	Name	Party	From	To
Prime Minister	Algirdas Brazauskas	Social Democratic Party of Lithuania	12 July 2001	14 December 2004
Ministry of Agriculture	Kęstutis Kristinaitis	Independent (endorsed by NS)	12 July 2001	21 September 2001
Ministry of Agriculture	Jeronimas Kraujelis	New Union (Social Liberals)	3 October 2001	14 December 2004
Ministry of Culture	Roma Dovydėnienė	Social Democratic Party of Lithuania	12 July 2001	14 December 2004
Ministry of Economy	Petras Čėsna	Social Democratic Party of Lithuania	12 July 2001	14 December 2004
Ministry of Education and Science	Algirdas Monkevičius	New Union (Social Liberals)	12 July 2001	14 December 2004
Ministry of Environment	Arūnas Kundrotas	Social Democratic Party of Lithuania	12 July 2001	14 December 2004
Ministry of Finance	Dalia Grybauskaitė	Independent (endorsed by LSDP)	12 July 2001	30 April 2004
Ministry of Finance	Algirdas Butkevičius	Social Democratic Party of Lithuania	4 May 2004	14 December 2004
Ministry of Foreign Affairs	Antanas Valionis	New Union (Social Liberals)	12 July 2001	14 December 2004
Ministry of Health	Konstantinas Dobrovolskis	New Union (Social Liberals)	12 July 2001	6 March 2003
Ministry of Health	Juozas Olekas	Social Democratic Party of Lithuania	10 March 2003	14 December 2004
Ministry of the Interior	Juozas Bernatonis	Social Democratic Party of Lithuania	12 July 2001	28 April 2003
Ministry of the Interior	Virgilijus Vladislovas Bulovas	Social Democratic Party of Lithuania	13 May 2003	14 December 2004
Ministry of Justice	Vytautas Markevičius	Independent (endorsed by NS)	12 July 2001	14 December 2004
Ministry of Defence	Linas Linkevičius	Social Democratic Party of Lithuania	12 July 2001	14 December 2004
Ministry of Social Security and Labour	Vilija Blinkevičiūtė	New Union (Social Liberals)	12 July 2001	14 December 2004
Ministry of Transport and Communications	Zigmantas Balčytis	Social Democratic Party of Lithuania	12 July 2001	14 December 2004
