= Paksas Cabinet II =

Cabinet of Lithuania

- 2000–2001
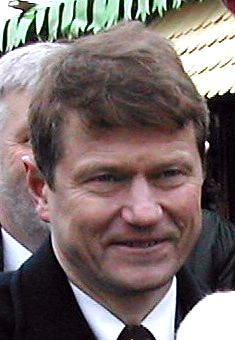
- Date formed: 8 November 2000
- Date dissolved: 12 July 2001

People and organisations
- Head of state: Valdas Adamkus
- Head of government: Rolandas Paksas
- Member parties: Liberal Union of Lithuania, New Union (Social Liberals), United parliamentary group (Lithuanian Centre Union, Modern Christian-Democratic Union, Electoral Action of Poles in Lithuania)
- Status in legislature: Minority with Peasants and New Democracy parties' parliamentary group confidence & supply (2000–2001); Minority coalition government (2001)
- Opposition party: Social-Democratic Coalition (Democratic Labour Party of Lithuania, Social Democratic Party of Lithuania, Union of the Russians of Lithuania), Homeland Union (2000) Social Democratic Party of Lithuania, Homeland Union, Peasants and New Democracy parties' parliamentary group (2001)
- Opposition leader: Vytenis Povilas Andriukaitis

History
- Legislature term: Eighth Seimas
- Predecessor: Kubilius Cabinet I
- Successor: Brazauskas Cabinet I

The Second Paksas Cabinet was the 11th cabinet of Lithuania since 1990. It consisted of the Prime Minister and 13 government ministers (Ministry of Government Reforms and Municipalities was merged into the Ministry of the Interior at the start of the term).

== History ==
Rolandas Paksas, the leader of the Liberal Union of Lithuania, was appointed the Prime Minister by President Valdas Adamkus on 27 October 2000, after the elections earlier in October. Paksas had previously headed a Homeland Union government in 1999. The 11th government, consisting of the "New Politics" coalition led by the Liberal Union and the New Union (Social Liberals), received its mandate and started its work on 9 November 2000, after the Seimas gave assent to its program.

This government was the first one formed without the Democratic Labour Party of Lithuania or the Homeland Union since 1992.

The government served for less than a year before disagreements within the coalition brought it down. By the mid-June, 2001 New Union (Social Liberals) started negotiations with Social Democratic Party of Lithuania. The government, led by Rolandas Paksas, resigned on 20 June 2001, but continued to serve in an acting capacity, with Eugenijus Gentvilas as the acting Prime Minister, until the new government, headed by Algirdas Brazauskas started its work on 12 July 2001.

== Cabinet ==
The following ministers served on the Second Paksas Cabinet.

Position	Name	Party	From	To
Prime Minister	Rolandas Paksas	Liberal Union of Lithuania	9 November 2000	20 June 2001
Ministry of Agriculture	Kęstutis Kristinaitis	Independent (Note: Nominated by New Union (Social Liberals))	9 November 2000	12 July 2001
Ministry of Culture	Gintautas Kėvišas	Liberal Union of Lithuania	9 November 2000	12 July 2001
Ministry of Economy	Eugenijus Maldeikis	Liberal Union of Lithuania	9 November 2000	14 February 2001
Ministry of Economy	Eugenijus Gentvilas	Liberal Union of Lithuania	15 February 2001	12 July 2001
Ministry of Education and Science	Algirdas Monkevičius	New Union (Social Liberals)	9 November 2000	12 July 2001
Ministry of Environment	Henrikas Žukauskas	Liberal Union of Lithuania	9 November 2000	12 July 2001
Ministry of Finance	Jonas Lionginas	Liberal Union of Lithuania	9 November 2000	12 July 2001
Ministry of Foreign Affairs	Antanas Valionis	New Union (Social Liberals)	9 November 2000	12 July 2001
Ministry of Health	Vinsas Janušonis	Independent	9 November 2000	2 April 2001
Ministry of Health	Konstantinas Dobrovolskis	New Union (Social Liberals)	15 May 2001	12 July 2001
Ministry of the Interior	Vytautas Markevičius	Independent	9 November 2000	12 July 2001
Ministry of Justice	Gintautas Bartkus	Independent (Note: Nominated by Liberal Union of Lithuania)	9 November 2000	12 July 2001
Ministry of Defence	Linas Linkevičius	Independent	9 November 2000	12 July 2001
Ministry of Social Security and Labour	Vilija Blinkevičiūtė	New Union (Social Liberals)	9 November 2000	12 July 2001
Ministry of Transport and Communications	Gintaras Striaukas	Liberal Union of Lithuania	9 November 2000	24 January 2001
Ministry of Transport and Communications	Dailis Alfonsas Barakauskas	Liberal Union of Lithuania	24 January 2001	12 July 2001
