= Šimėnas Cabinet =

Lithuanian Prime Minister Cabinet

The Šimėnas Cabinet was the 2nd cabinet of Lithuania since the country's declaration of independence in 1990. It consisted of the Prime Minister and 17 government ministers.

Albertas Šimėnas was appointed Prime Minister by the Supreme Council of Lithuania on 10 January 1991, following the dismissal of the previous cabinet.

Just three days later, the January events took place in Vilnius, threatening the fledgling government. During these events, Šimėnas failed to appear at a government meeting after being summoned and could not be located. This prompted the Supreme Council to dismiss him on January 13 and appoint Gediminas Vagnorius in his place. It was later revealed that Šimėnas had left Vilnius and spent the night in the relative safety of Druskininkai.

As of 2025, it remains the shortest-lived government of Lithuania.

== Cabinet ==
The following ministers served on the Šimėnas Cabinet.

Position	Name
Ministry of Agriculture	Vytautas Knašys
Ministry of Culture and Education	Darius Kuolys
Ministry of Economy	Vytas Navickas
Ministry of Finance	Romualdas Sikorskis
Ministry of Foreign Affairs	Algirdas Saudargas
Ministry of Health	Juozas Olekas
Ministry of the Interior	Marijonas Misiukonis
Ministry of Justice	Pranas Kūris
Ministry of Social Security	Algis Dobravolskas
Ministry of Transport and Communications	Jonas Bižiškis
Ministry of Energy	Leonas Ašmantas
Ministry of Forestry	Vaidotas Antanaitis
Ministry of Trade	Albertas Sinevičius
Ministry of Industry	Rimvydas Jasinavičius
Ministry of Communications	Kostas Birulis
Ministry of Construction and Urbanistics	Algimantas Nasvytis
Ministry of Material Resources	Romualdas Kozyrovičius
