= Balčytis =

- Lithuanian surname
- m.: Balčytis
- f.: (unmarried): Balčytytė
- f.: (married): Balčytienė

Balčytis is a Lithuanian surname.

- Eduardas Balčytis (1937–2021), Lithuanian horn player, choir director, musicologist, educator
- Zigmantas Balčytis, Lithuanian politician
