= Brazauskas Cabinet II =

- 2004–2006
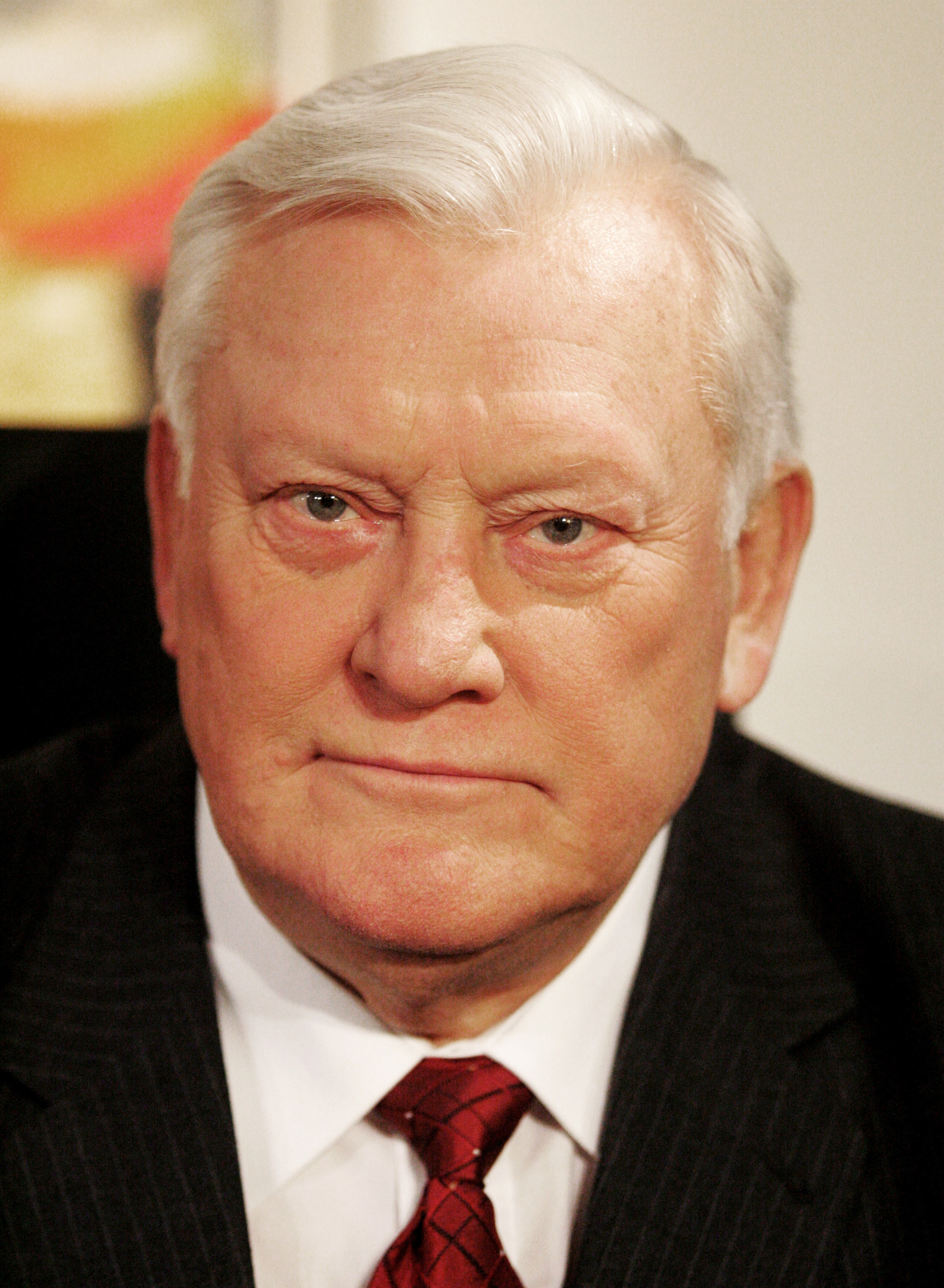
- Date formed: 14 December 2004
- Date dissolved: 1 June 2006

People and organisations
- Head of state: Valdas Adamkus
- Head of government: Algirdas Brazauskas
- Member parties: Social Democratic Party of Lithuania, Labour Party, Lithuanian Peasant Popular Union, New Union (Social Liberals) (2004–2006) Social Democratic Party of Lithuania, Labour Party, Lithuanian Peasant Popular Union (2006)
- Status in legislature: Majority coalition government (2004–2006); Minority coalition government (2006)
- Opposition parties: Homeland Union (Lithuanian Conservatives), Liberal and Centre Union, Liberal Democratic Party (2004–2005) Homeland Union (Lithuanian Conservatives), Liberal and Centre Union, Liberal Democratic Party, Liberal parliamentary group (2005–2006) Homeland Union (Lithuanian Conservatives), Liberal and Centre Union, New Union (Social Liberals), Liberal Democratic Party, Liberal Movement (2006)
- Opposition leader: Andrius Kubilius (2005–2006)

History
- Election: 2004 Lithuanian parliamentary election
- Legislature term: Ninth Seimas
- Predecessor: Brazauskas Cabinet I
- Successor: Kirkilas Cabinet

The Second Brazauskas Cabinet was the 13th cabinet of Lithuania since 1990. It consisted of the Prime Minister and 13 government ministers.

== History ==
Algirdas Brazauskas, the leader of the Social Democratic Party of Lithuania had led the 12th government as the Prime Minister since 2001. The outgoing government coalition "Working for Lithuania" finished second in the elections in October 2004, behind the populist Labour Party, but Brazauskas was again appointed the Prime Minister by President Valdas Adamkus on 29 November 2004. The 13th cabinet received its mandate and started its work on 14 December 2004, after the Seimas gave assent to its program.

The government collapsed in late spring of 2006, when in April New Union (Social Liberals) left the coalition and in May President Adamkus expressed no-confidence in Minister of Culture Vladimiras Prudnikovas and Minister of Health Žilvinas Padaiga, who were delegated by the Labour Party. This criticism caused the Labour Party's council to withdraw its ministers from the government, prompting Brazauskas to resign on 1 June 2006. By the first week of May, the government became minority one as 9 members of Labor Party parliamentary group (including Speaker of Seimas Viktoras Muntianas) formed their own parliamentary group, which was called Civic Democratic parliamentary group. The government continued to serve in an acting capacity, with Zigmantas Balčytis as the acting Prime Minister until the Kirkilas Cabinet started its work on 18 July 2006.

== Cabinet ==
The following ministers served on the Second Brazauskas Cabinet.

Position	Name	Party	From	To
Prime Minister	Algirdas Brazauskas	Social Democratic Party of Lithuania	14 December 2004	1 June 2006
Ministry of Agriculture	Kazimira Prunskienė	Lithuanian Peasant Popular Union	14 December 2004	18 July 2006
Ministry of Culture	Vladimiras Prudnikovas	Labour Party	14 December 2004	18 July 2006
Ministry of Economy	Viktor Uspaskich	Labour Party	14 December 2004	21 June 2005
Ministry of Economy	Kęstutis Daukšys	Labour Party	29 June 2005	18 July 2006
Ministry of Education and Science	Remigijus Motuzas	Social Democratic Party of Lithuania	14 December 2004	18 July 2006
Ministry of Environment	Arūnas Kundrotas	Social Democratic Party of Lithuania	14 December 2004	18 July 2006
Ministry of Finance	Algirdas Butkevičius	Social Democratic Party of Lithuania	14 December 2004	14 May 2005
Ministry of Finance	Zigmantas Balčytis	Social Democratic Party of Lithuania	14 May 2005	18 July 2006
Ministry of Foreign Affairs	Antanas Valionis	New Union (Social Liberals)	14 December 2004	18 July 2006
Ministry of Health	Žilvinas Padaiga	Labour Party	14 December 2004	18 July 2006
Ministry of the Interior	Gintaras Furmanavičius	Labour Party	14 December 2004	18 July 2006
Ministry of Justice	Gintautas Bužinskas	Labour Party	14 December 2004	18 July 2006
Ministry of Defence	Gediminas Kirkilas	Social Democratic Party of Lithuania	14 December 2004	18 July 2006
Ministry of Social Security and Labour	Vilija Blinkevičiūtė	New Union (Social Liberals)	14 December 2004	18 July 2006
Ministry of Social Security and Labour	Vilija Blinkevičiūtė	Social Democratic Party of Lithuania	14 December 2004	18 July 2006
Ministry of Transport and Communications	Zigmantas Balčytis	Social Democratic Party of Lithuania	14 December 2004	14 May 2005
Ministry of Transport and Communications	Petras Čėsna	Social Democratic Party of Lithuania	10 June 2005	18 July 2006
