= Konstantinas Dobrovolskis =

Lithuanian radiologist (1939–2021)

Minister of Health of Lithuania
- In office 15 May 2001 – 6 March 2003
- Prime Minister: Rolandas Paksas; Algirdas Brazauskas
- Preceded by: Vinsas Janušonis
- Succeeded by: Juozas Olekas

Personal details
- Born: 25 December 1939 Radviliškis, Lithuania
- Died: 5 May 2021 (aged 81)
- Party: New Union
- Education: Vilnius University
- Occupation: Radiologist, government minister

Konstantinas Romualdas Dobrovolskis (25 December 1939 – 5 May 2021) was a Lithuanian radiologist who was the Minister of Health of Lithuania from 2001 to 2003, serving in both Paksas Cabinet II and Brazauskas Cabinet I.

Born in the town of Radviliškis in 1939, he graduated from secondary school in Telšiai in 1957 and subsequently graduated from Vilnius University's Faculty of Medicine in 1963, becoming a radiologist. During his time as a radiologist, he worked as part of the central committee of the Lithuanian Red Cross society and later became its vice-chairman. He also went on to become the head of the X-ray diagnostics department at Vilnius Red Cross Hospital. From 1992 to 2005, he was the director of Vilnius University Hospital Santaros Klinikos. After his term ended, he became a consultant there, along with working at the tomography clinic.

Dobrovolskis died on 5 May 2021.
