= Jurgita Petrauskienė =

Lithuanian politician

Jurgita Petrauskienė, born 1975 March 30th in Utena, is a Lithuanian politician. She served as the Minister of Education and Science in the cabinet of Prime Minister Saulius Skvernelis from 13 December 2016 to 7 December 2018. Algirdas Monkevičius was appointed as her successor. She is currently married to her former classmate Evaldas Petrauskas. She also has two children, Jonas and Julija.
