= Seimas Palace =

Seimo rūmai Seimas Palace
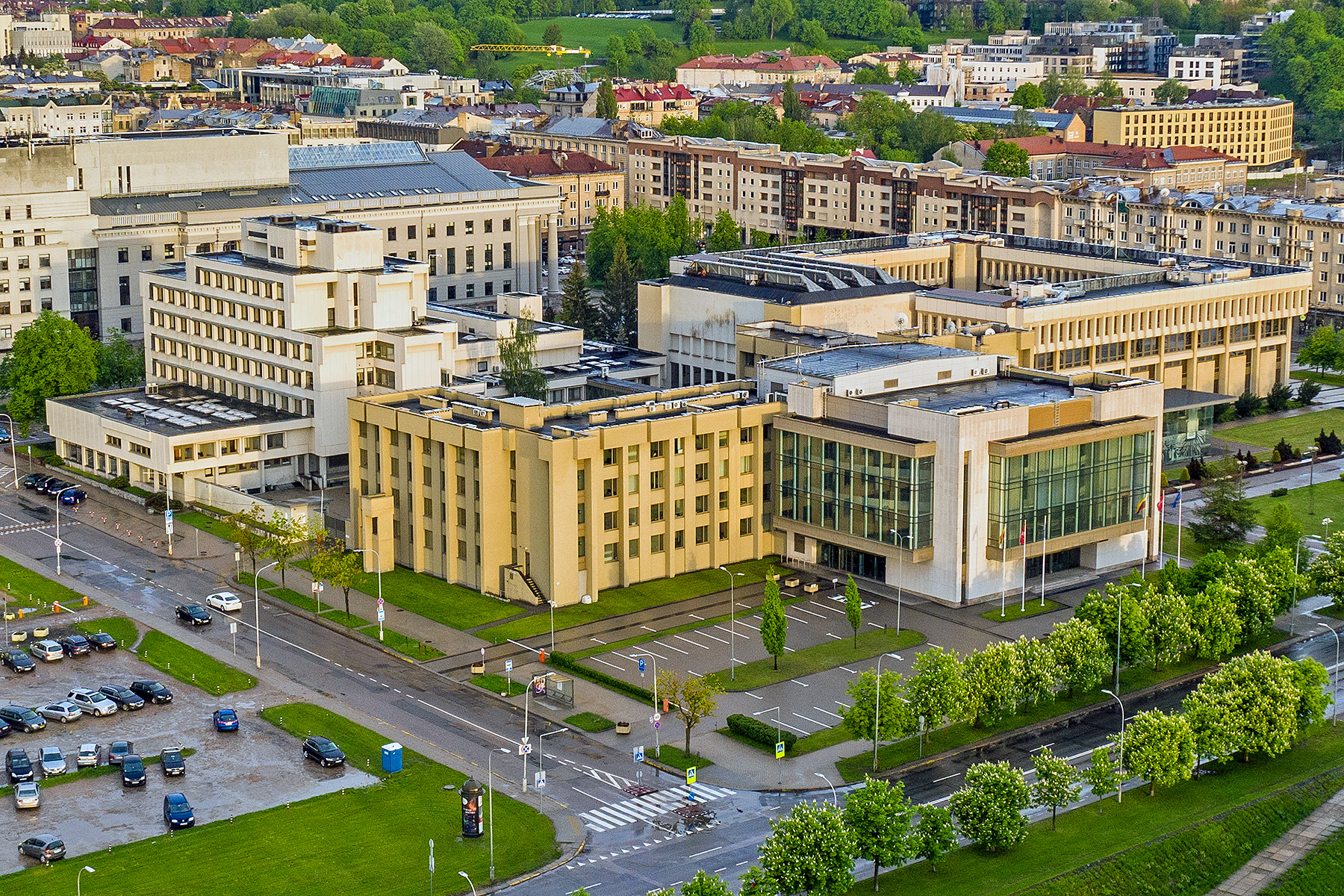
- Campus of Lithuanian Seimas
- Interactive map of the Seimo rūmai Seimas Palace area

General information
- Location: Vilnius, Lithuania
- Coordinates: 54°41′28″N 25°15′43″E
- Construction started: 1976
- Completed: 1980; 46 years ago

Design and construction
- Architects: Algimantas Nasvytis, Vytautas Nasvytis

Seimas Palace (Lithuanian: Seimo rūmai) is the seat of the Seimas, the Lithuanian parliament. It is located in Lithuania's capital Vilnius.

== History ==
First Building of Seimas Palace

The decision to build a seat for the Supreme Soviet of Lithuanian SSR was made in 1969. The location of the Youth Football Stadium, in the Gediminas Avenue, was chosen for the project. The stadium was then demolished. Architects Algimantas Nasvytis and Vytautas Nasvytis were chosen to design and supervise the project and decided on a square plan for the main building of the complex. In 1976, the construction works began on the first wing of the palace. In 1980, 9717.37 square meters of the palace were completed. Initially, the palace was named as "Soviet Palace". The other two wings housed the Ministry of Finance of Lithuanian SSR and the Trade Unions Council. Later the building was expanded due to growing needs. The final phase of the palace complex consists of three wings, with the main, or first wing, housing the Parliament Hall, where legislation is passed.

On 11 March 1990, Lithuania's independence was re-established in the old Parliament Hall, where the re-establishment declaration from the Soviet Union was adopted. On the same day, most of the emblems of the Lithuanian SSR, which were installed, were removed or covered by the coat of arms of Lithuania. In addition, in 1993–1997 the western wing of the first wing gave temporary shelter to the President of the Republic of Lithuania. Now, as in 1990–1992, it again houses the offices of the Speaker of Parliament and his Secretariat.

In 2006, work started on building a new Parliament Hall. Employees in the second wing were housed in temporary accommodation. On 10 September 2007, the new Parliament Hall was officially opened. It cost fifty million litas. The old Parliament Hall remained to be used for celebratory sessions of the Seimas (e. g. opening sessions of newly elected Seimas).

== Gallery ==
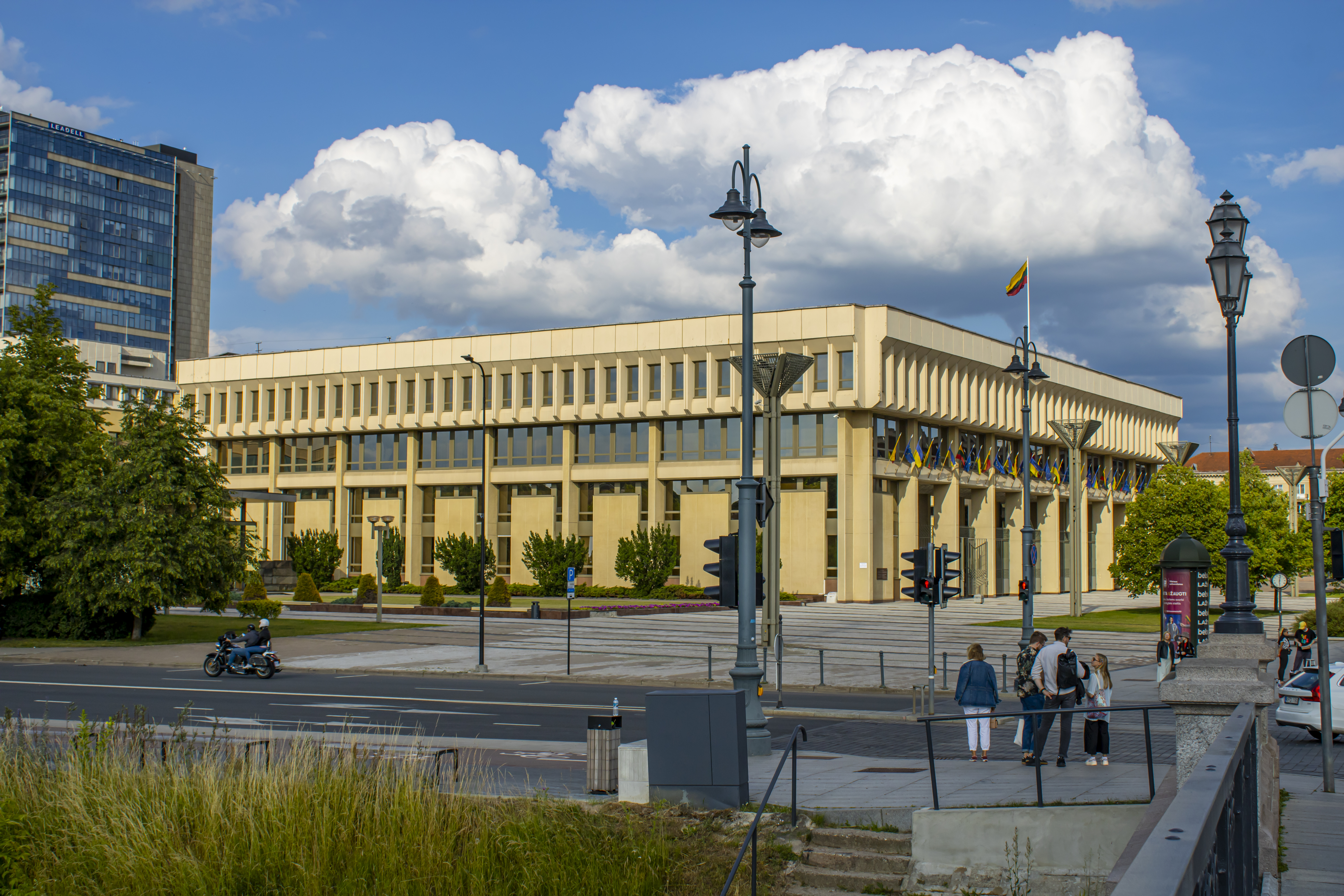
View of the First Seimas Palace Building from Žvėrynas Bridge

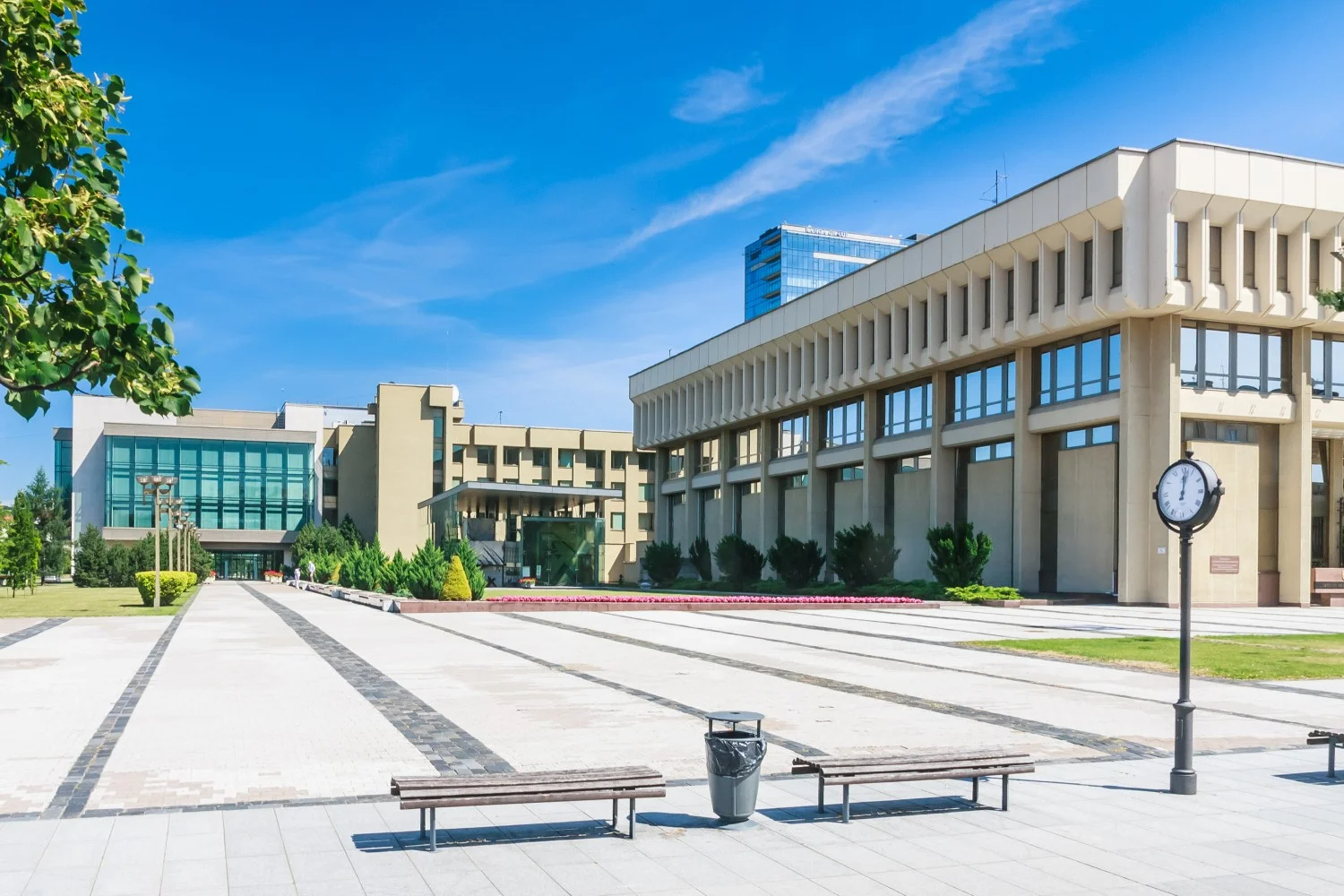
Building 1 and 2

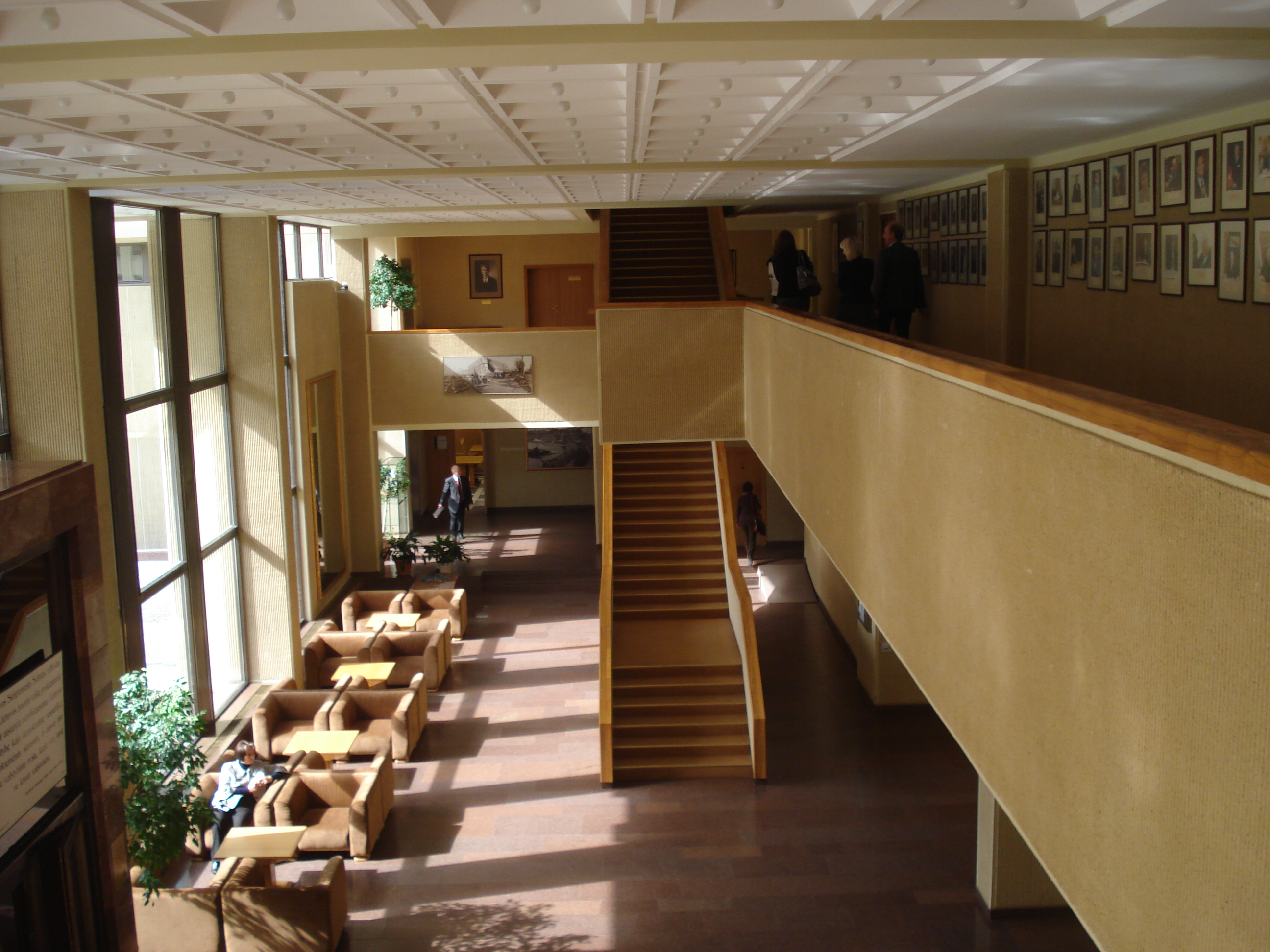
Interior of Building 1

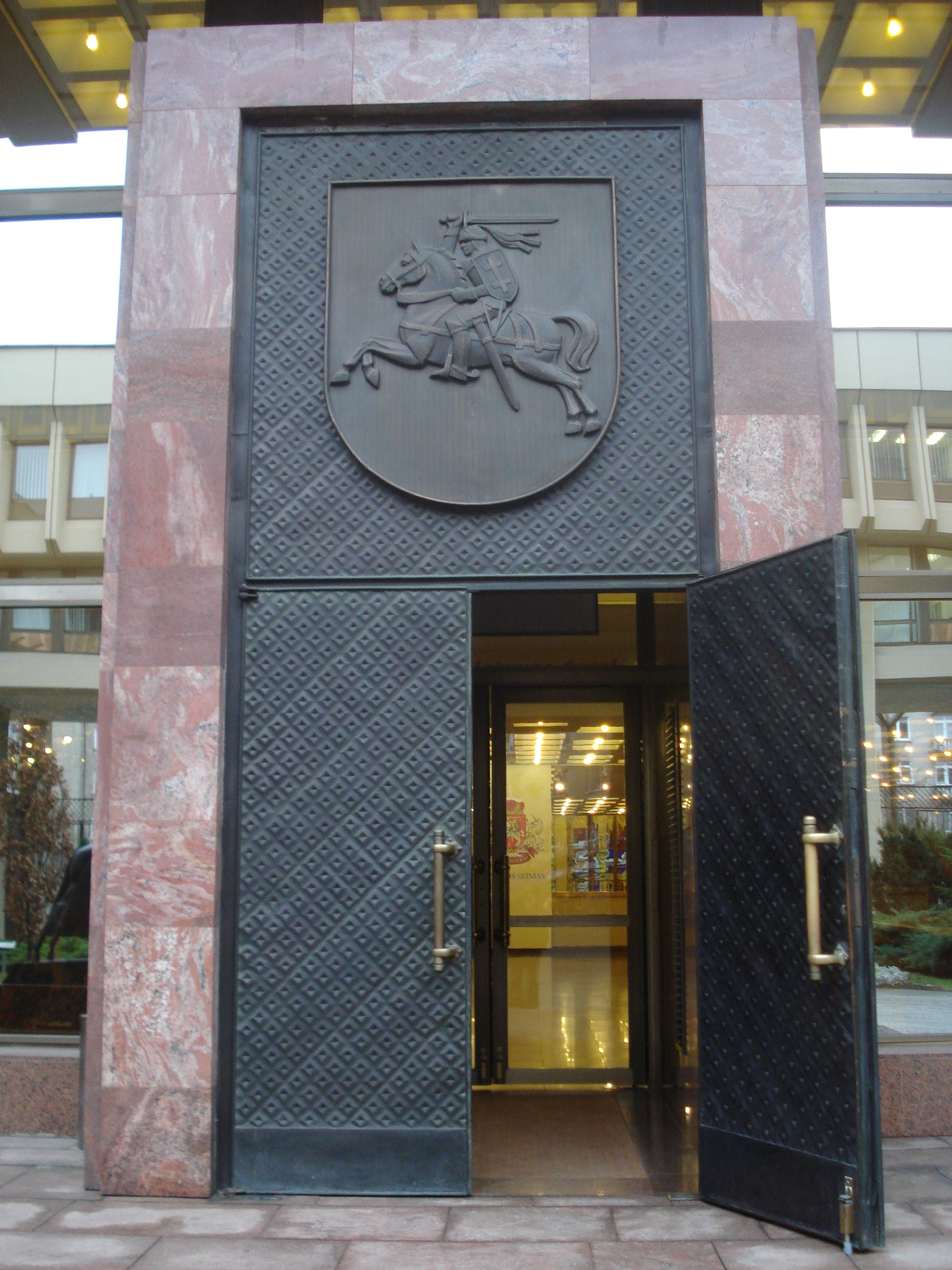
Door entrance

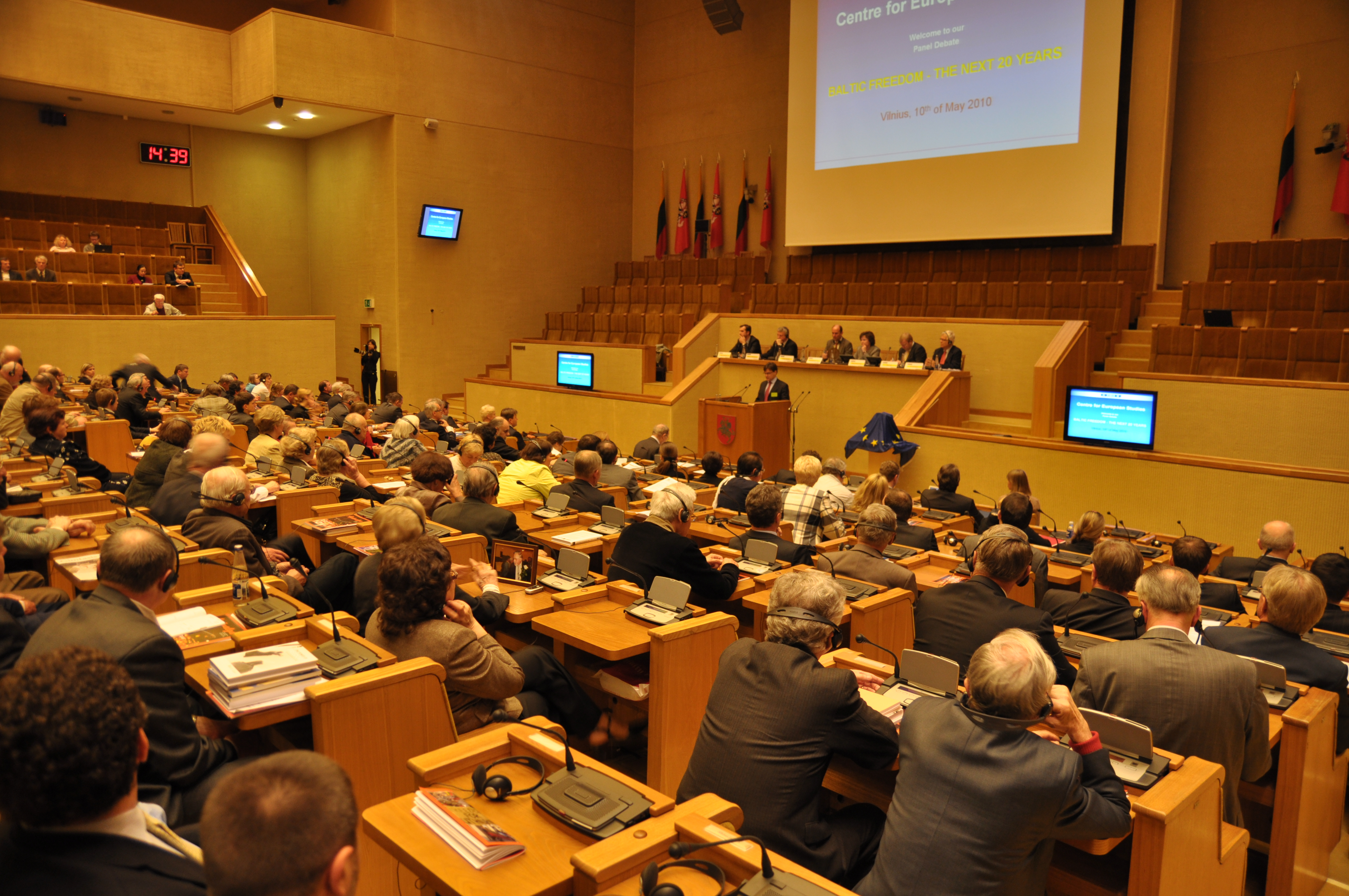
Old Parliament Hall "Act of 11 March"

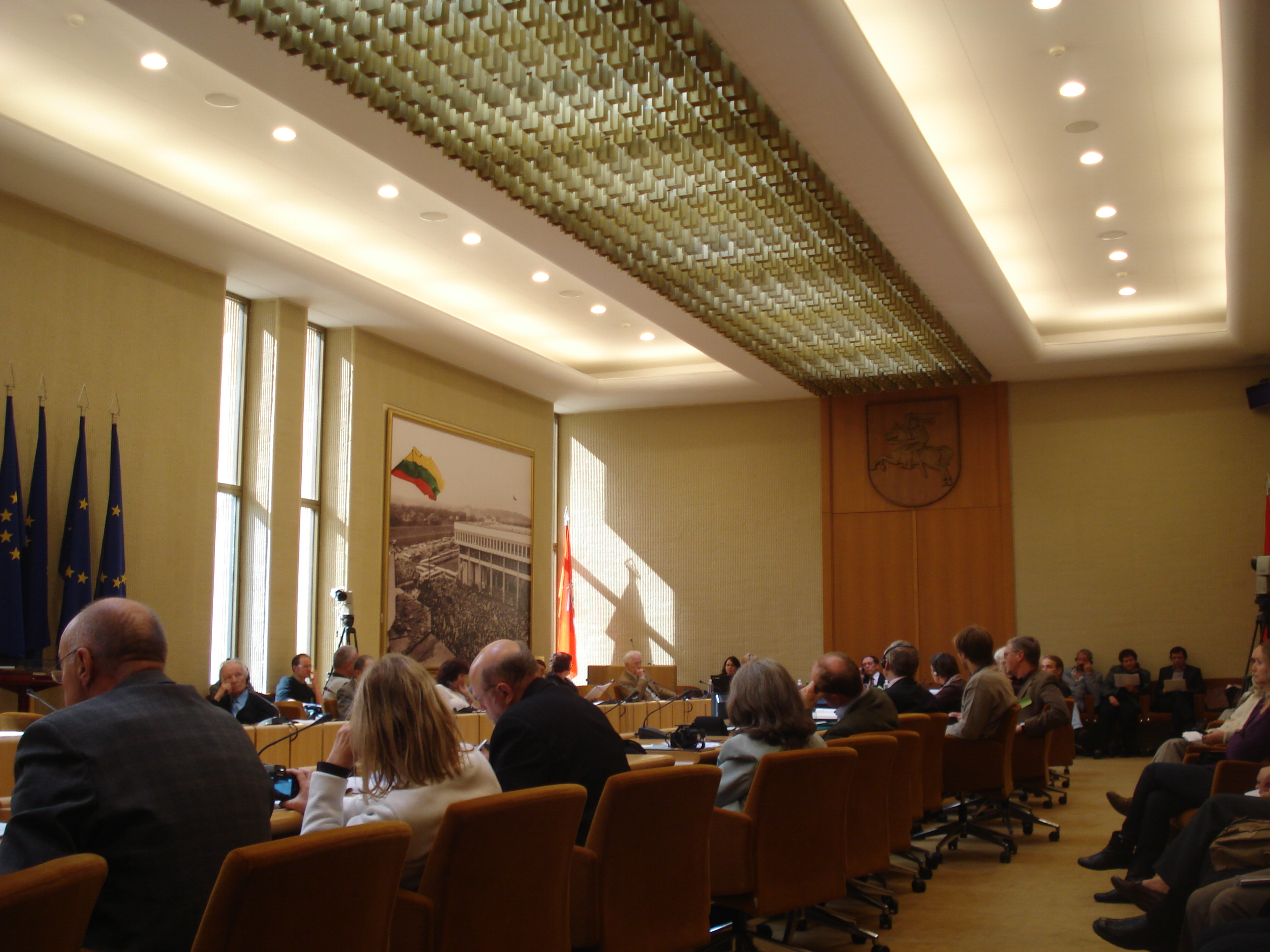
Constitution Hall

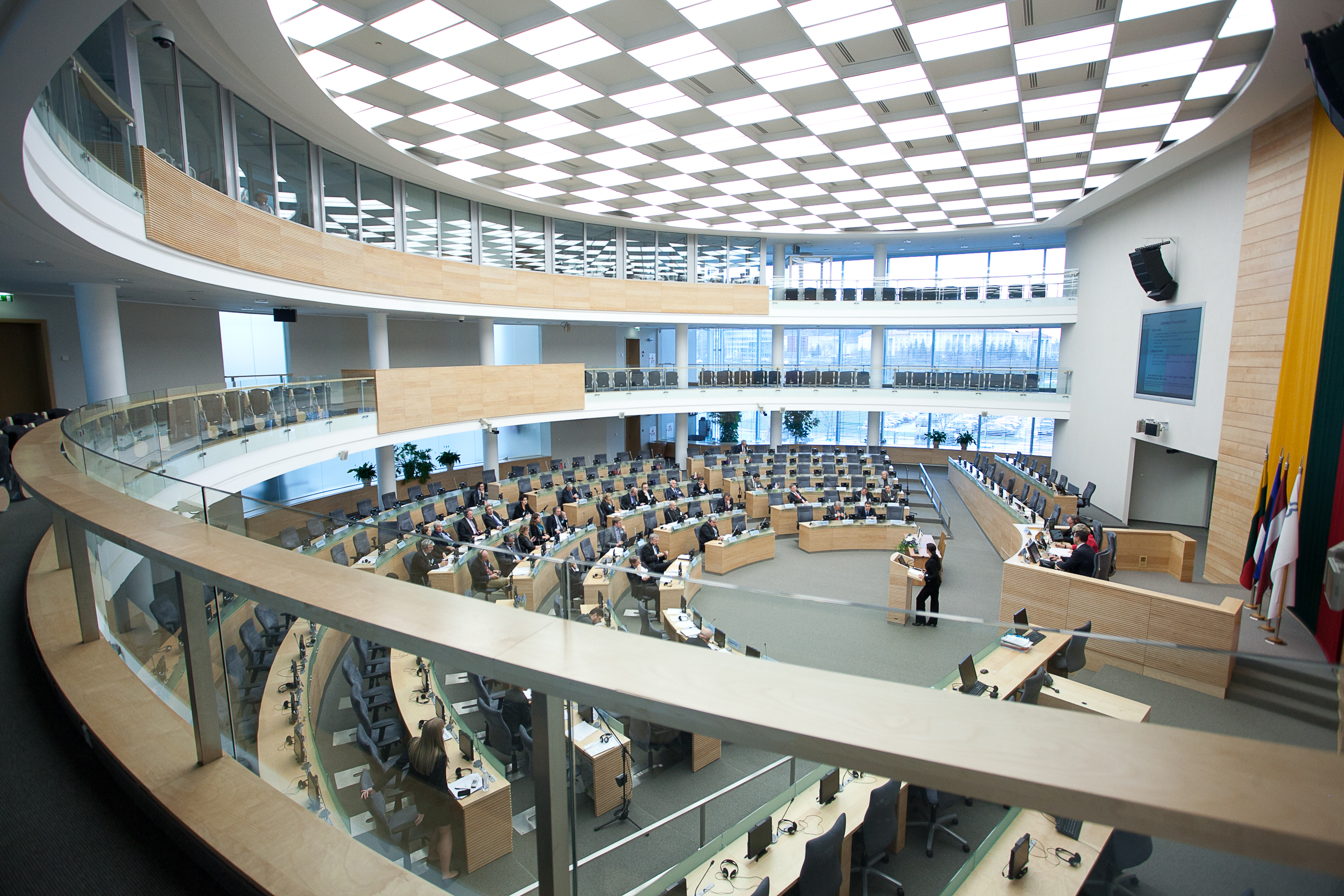
New Parliament Hall

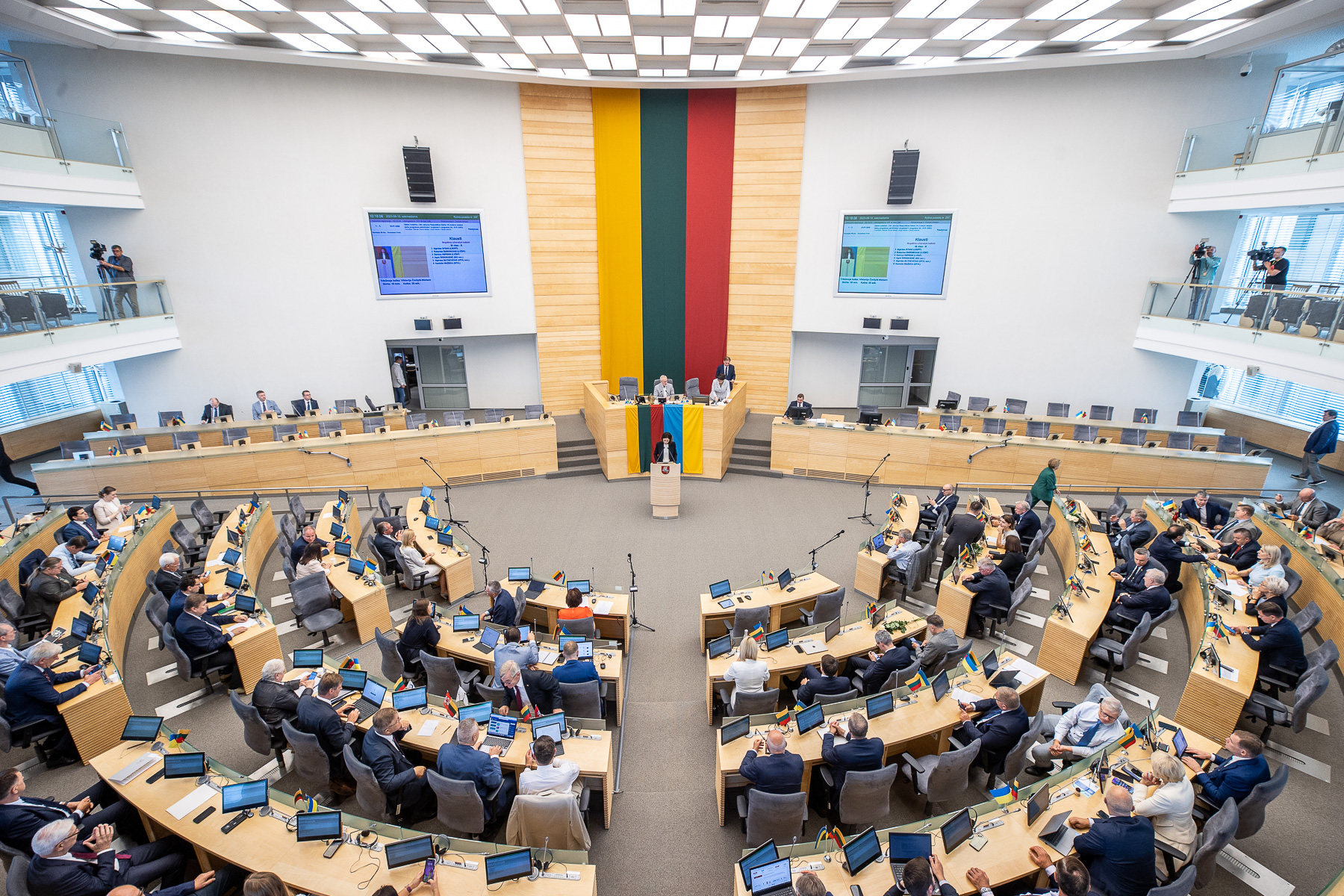
Central view of the New Parliament Hall

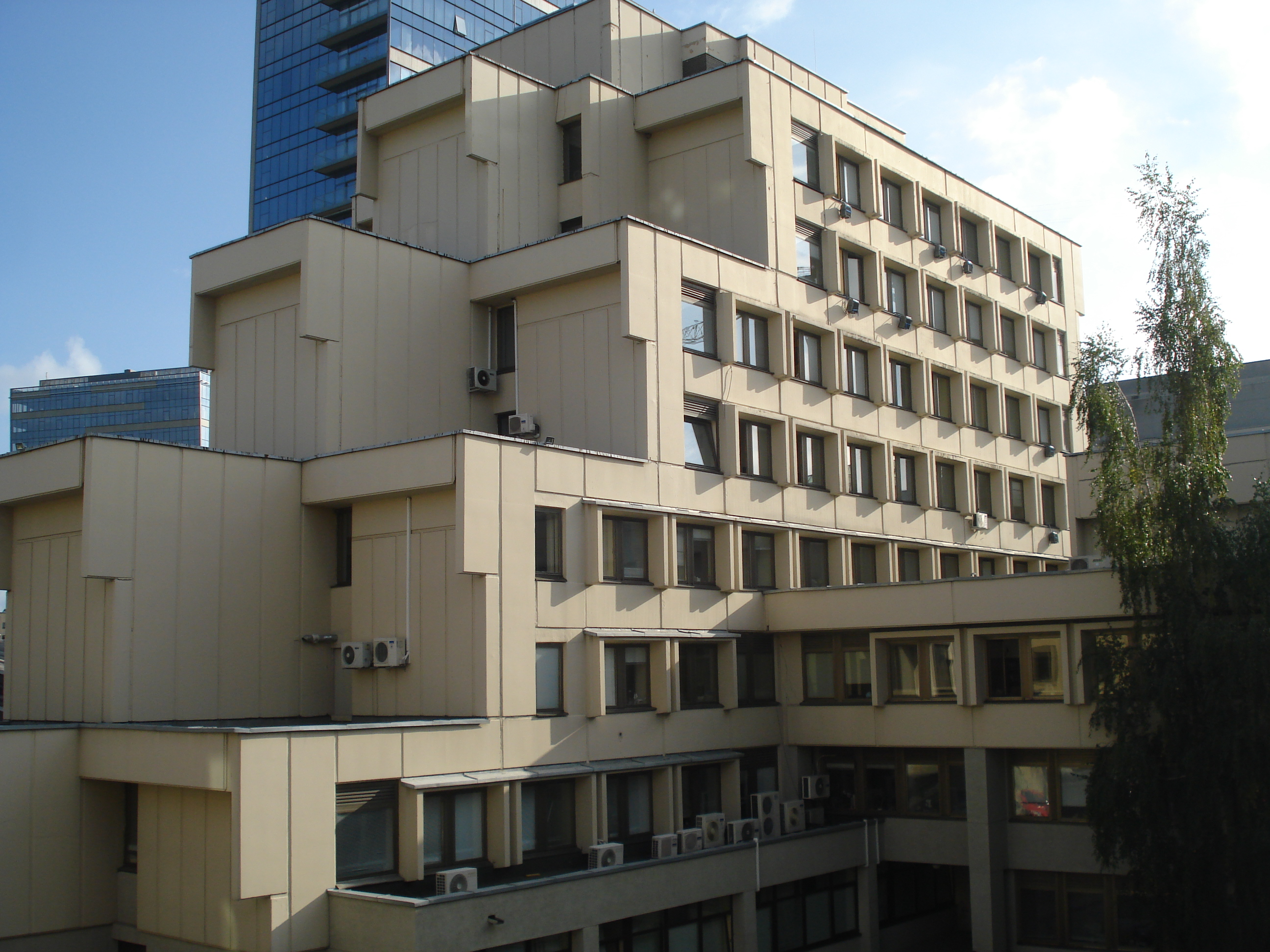
Building 3

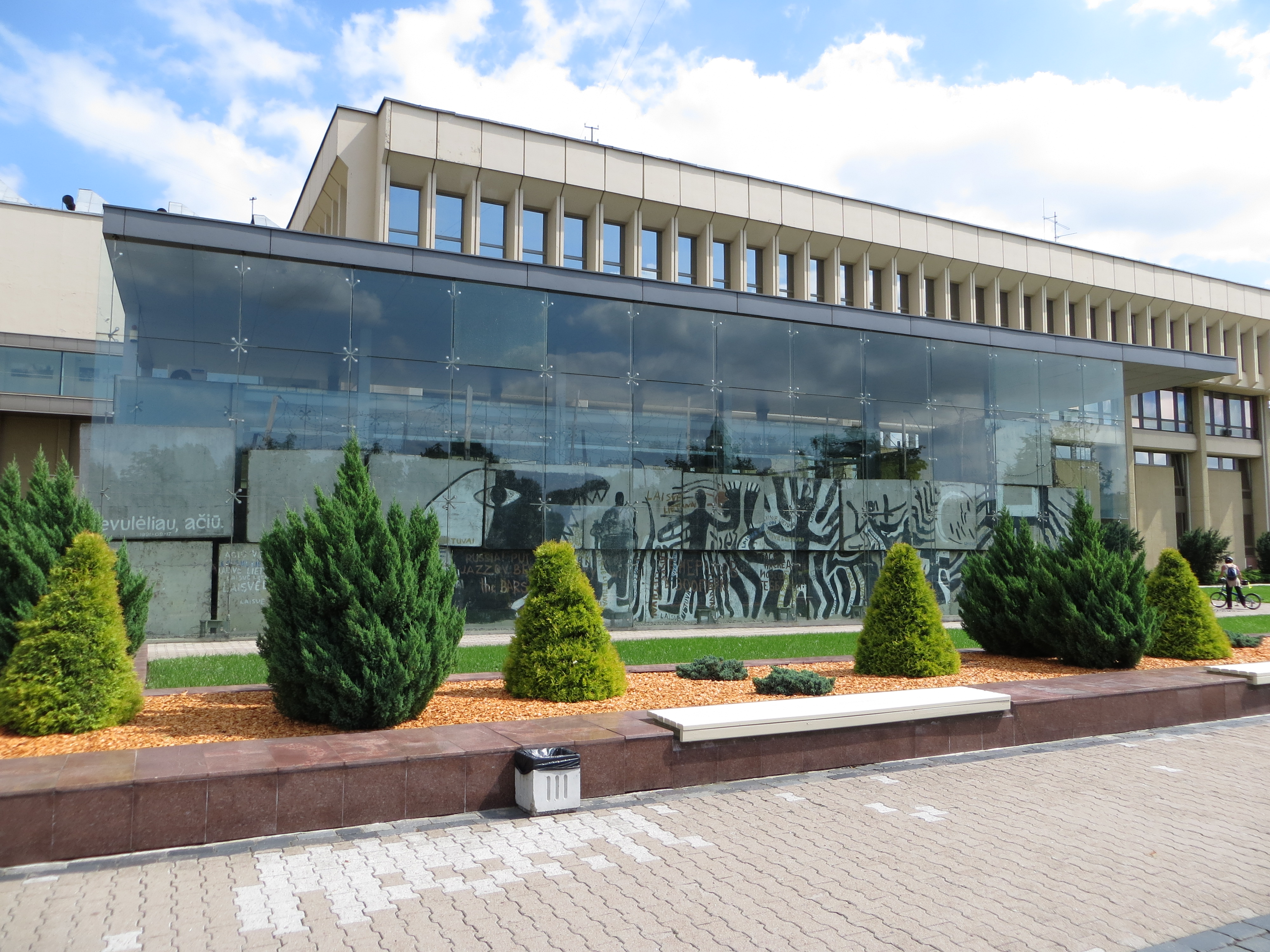
Remains of the Seimas barricades

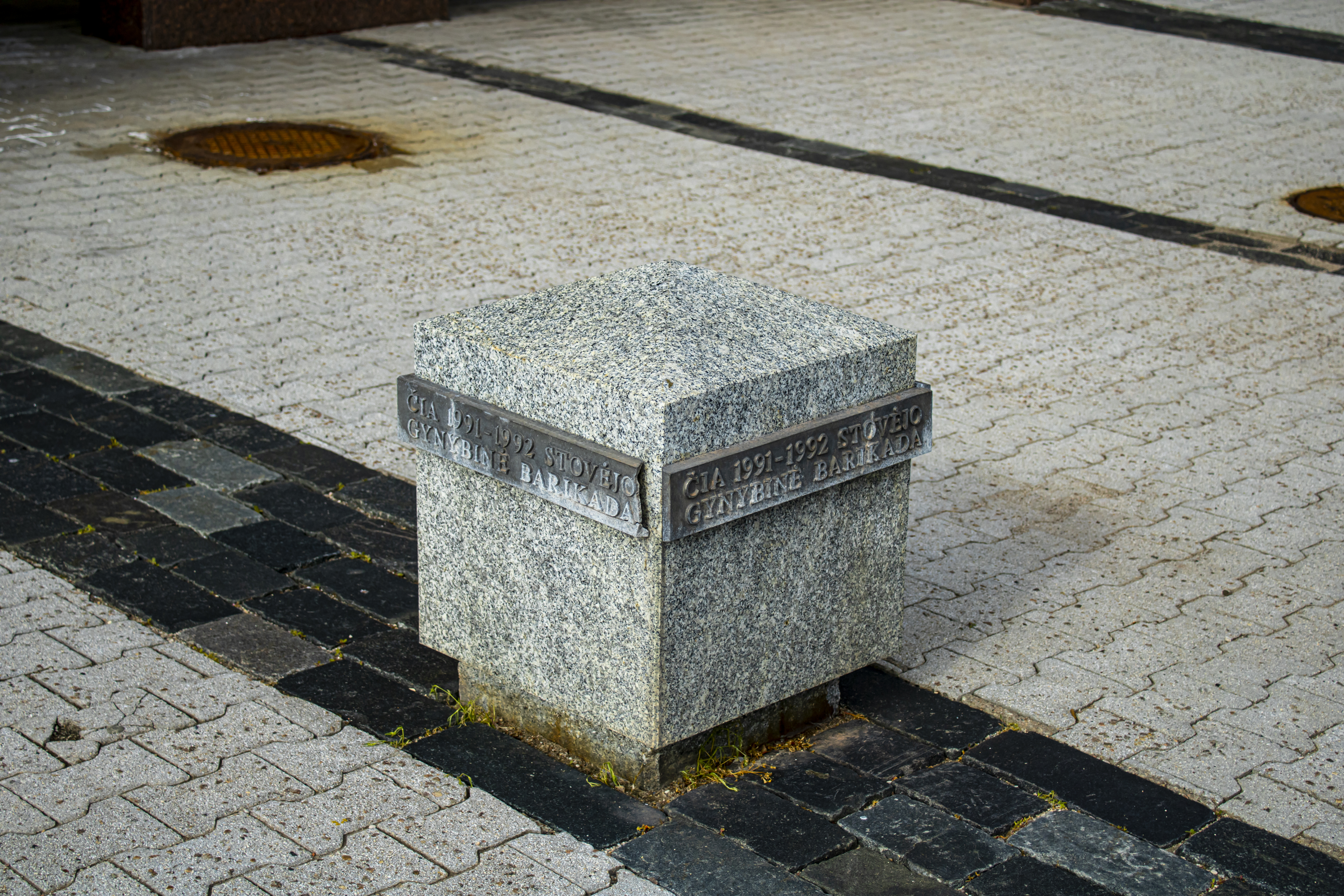
Boundary marker of the former defensive barricade

== See also ==
- Kaunas Maironis University Gymnasium
- Government of Lithuania
- Great Seimas of Vilnius
