= Prunskienė Cabinet =

The Prunskienė Cabinet was the 1st cabinet of Lithuania since the declaration of independence in 1990. It consisted of the Prime Minister and 17 government ministers.

Kazimiera Prunskienė was appointed as the first Prime Minister by the Supreme Council of Lithuania on 17 March 1990, six days after declararing the independence. During the next year, the government worked on securing the Lithuanian independence, rather than introducing substantial reforms. Economic crisis and rising prices led to dissatisfaction with the government and its dismissal on 10 January 1991, in the opening stages of the January events.

It was the only government in history of independent Lithuania to have two deputy prime ministers. Also, it was first in history of Lithuania to be led by woman.

== Cabinet ==
The following ministers served on the Prunskienė Cabinet.

Position	Name
Deputy Prime Minister	Algirdas Brazauskas
Deputy Prime Minister	Romualdas Ozolas
Ministry of Agriculture	Vytautas Knašys
Ministry of Culture and Education	Darius Kuolys
Ministry of Economy	Vytas Navickas
Ministry of Finance	Romualdas Sikorskis
Ministry of Foreign Affairs	Algirdas Saudargas
Ministry of Health	Juozas Olekas
Ministry of the Interior	Marijonas Misiukonis
Ministry of Justice	Pranas Kūris
Ministry of Social Security	Algis Dobravolskas
Ministry of Transport and Communications	Jonas Bižiškis
Ministry of Energy	Leonas Ašmantas
Ministry of Forestry	Vaidotas Antanaitis
Ministry of Trade	Albertas Sinevičius
Ministry of Industry	Rimvydas Jasinavičius
Ministry of Communications	Kostas Birulis
Ministry of Construction and Urbanistics	Algimantas Nasvytis
Ministry of Material Resources	Romualdas Kozyrovičius
