= Vilius Židonis =

Lithuanian engineer

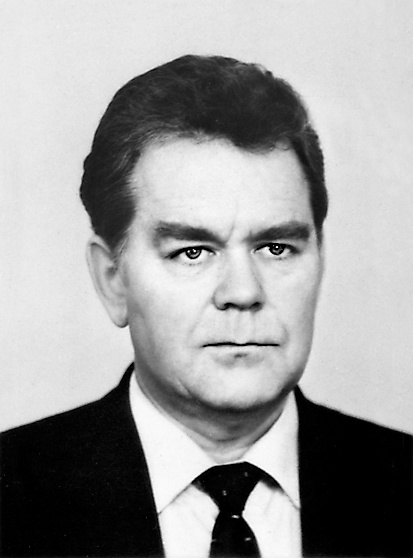
- Vilius Židonis
- Born: 26 April 1933; Meškalaukis, Pasvalys district, Lithuania
- Died: 25 February 2018 (aged 84); Klaipėda, Lithuania
- Resting place: Slengiai cemetery
- Education: Kaunas University of Technology
- Occupations: Inventor; mechanical engineer
- Known for: Automated packaging; heating boiler combustion technology
- Awards: Soviet gold medal; Eureka - 67; USSR State Prize

Vilius Židonis (26 April 1933 – 25 February 2018) was a Lithuanian mechanical engineer, inventor, founder of the Lithuanian Academy of Applied Sciences, and the minister of national resources of the Ministry of Economy and Innovation from 1991 to 1992. He is best known for furthering the development of automated production in the Soviet Union, for which he was awarded multiple prizes. He is the father of author and painter Violeta Židonytė.

== Biography ==
=== Early life ===
Vilius Židonis was born on 26 April 1933 in the village of Meškalaukis of the Pasvalys district in Lithuania to well-off farmer Juozapas Židonis and teacher Apolonija Gumbelevičiūtė. Židonis's mother was the youngest daughter of Simonas Gumbelevičius, the last Lithuanian book smuggler. Hailing from an educated family, Židonis's interest in engineering began at a young age – Židonis would often help fix his father's tractor, and would trade shepherd's work for toy construction. In 1938 Židonis began attending primary school in Gustoniai. After graduating, Židonis attended gymnasiums in Biržai, Pasvalys, and Joniškėlis. On 21 May 1948 Židonis, at the age of 15, along with his four younger brothers and their mother, were deported to Buryatia in Siberia, as part of the Soviet mass deportation program's Operation Vesna. Židonis's father only came to visit their family four years later in 1952.

=== Studies ===
In Siberia from 1948 to 1952, Židonis worked as an assistant forest industry worker, locksmith, blacksmith, tractor operator, foreman, and mechanic, consequently missing six years of school. After the death of Stalin in 1953, mass deportations to Siberia began to gradually end, and in 1955 Židonis managed to get employed in the Tomsk Railway Institute. In 1955 he married fellow deportee Janina Čeponytė. From 1955 to 1956 Židonis attended middle school in Zaigrayevsky District. In 1956, Židonis returned home to Kaunas after eight years of exile, where he studied at the Kaunas University of Technology. Knowing that obtaining the academic aspirant degree would be hard due to his background of deportation, Židonis began participating in activities of a students' scientific society.

=== Work as an engineer and inventor in the USSR ===
After completing studies in 1960, Židonis was assigned to work at an automatized equipment factory in Kaunas. However, in 1961, only after a year of work, Židonis was ordered by the KGB to leave the city and not settle in any of the major Lithuanian cities. As a result, Židonis settled in Marijampolė (then called Kapsukas), and worked as a chief engineer of the factory's Special Construction Bureau. Due to Židonis's incentive, constructors in the factory rose from just 3 to 120; this was done by re-qualifying physicists and mathematicians with diplomas. He would defend his doctoral dissertation in 1962 and became a lecturer as well as docent at the Kaunas Polytechnic Institute, where he created a laboratory for his automated machines which were highly appreciated by the then Minister of Chemical Industry, Leonid Kostandov. Since then, work on the construction of automata and the development of the corresponding theory based on applied scientific research began. In his laboratory, Židonis worked to create more efficient packaging machines by manufacturing, testing, and preparing documentation for them. Such a structure of construction did not exist in any of the 987 high schools of the Soviet Union. Židonis' devices were replicated by an automized food factory in Marijampolė.

While working within the field of automated packaging, some of Židonis's works already were considered inventions. In 1965 he attended the Lithuanian inventors' exhibition. He was awarded a gold medal for his contribution to the development of the national economy. In 1967, for the creation of efficient packaging machines and constant support for new inventors, Židonis received the grand prize "Eureka - 67" of the Lithuanian Inventors' Salon. This was the first such award in Lithuania.

Under the leadership of Židonis, original and efficient automatic machines for packaging food and chemical products in film containers were created. Bulk packaging machines became a huge success and were successfully used for more than 40 years. He was the first inventor in Lithuania at the time whose inventions were valued at significant sums as they were economically efficient. This is evidenced by a certificate signed by Jonas Šeškevičius, the then director of the Marijampolė food industry factory, which stated that only in fifteen years (from 1971 to 1986) the packaging machines created by Židonis yielded a 165 million ruble economic profit. Since 1976 Židonis was the head of the Department of Mechanical Disciplines of the Klaipėda faculty of the Kaunas Polytechnic Institute, and became a professor in 1977. In 1990 he established the Institute of Scientific and Technical Creativity entitled "Studija". During his time in the Soviet Union, Židonis mentored 21 academic doctors and 70 inventors, wrote about 140 science and science popularization articles, as well as published 2 scientific books, having co-authored two more. In 1982 he was awarded the USSR State Prize. 150 inventions are attributed to Židonis in total, 11 of which came from post-Soviet Lithuania.

=== Later years and work in newly independent Lithuania ===
Right after the January Events, Židonis was called by the third cabinet of the government led by Gediminas Vagnorius to work as the minister of natural resources from 1991 to 1992. He was also briefly part of the deputy council of Klaipėda. After his tenure in the government, Židonis retired from work and never returned to Klaipėda. Instead, he took up solving problems of alternative energy. In 1993 he founded the scientific production company "Slengiai", becoming its scientific manager and owner. In 2009 Židonis also invented new combustion technology for the heating boiler, which made it possible to reduce the slagging of the burning straw pellets, making it more environmentally friendly. In 2001, under his initiative, the Lithuanian Academy of Applied Sciences was established. In 2008 he was awarded the title of associate professor at Klaipėda University.

Vilius Židonis died on 7 July 2018 in Klaipėda. He was buried in the Slengiai cemetery.
