= Albertas Šimėnas =

Prime Minister of Lithuania

2nd Prime Minister of Lithuania
- In office 10 January 1991 – 13 January 1991
- Preceded by: Kazimiera Prunskienė
- Succeeded by: Gediminas Vagnorius

Minister of Economy of Lithuania
- In office 30 May 1992 – 21 July 1992
- Preceded by: Vytas Navickas
- Succeeded by: Vytas Navickas

Member of the Seimas
- In office 25 November 1996 – 18 October 2000
- Constituency: Druskininkai

Personal details
- Born: 17 February 1950 (age 76) Papiliai, then part of Lithuanian SSR, Soviet Union
- Party: Independent (1990); Lithuanian Christian Democratic Party (1994-2004); Homeland Union (since 2008)
- Other political affiliations: Sąjūdis (1990–1992)
- Spouse: Valerija Šimėnienė
- Children: 4
- Education: Vilnius University

Albertas Šimėnas (born 17 February 1950) is a Lithuanian politician who served as Prime Minister of Lithuania for 3 days, from 10 to 13 January 1991. He disappeared during the January Events and was replaced by Gediminas Vagnorius.

Šimėnas graduated from the Vilnius University in 1972 with a degree in economics. He lectured at the Vilnius Gediminas Technical University from 1984 to 1989. He joined activities of Sąjūdis movement and was elected to the Supreme Council – Reconstituent Seimas. On 11 March 1990 he signed the Act of the Re-Establishment of the State of Lithuania, declaring Lithuania's independence from the Soviet Union. In January 1991, when the first government led by Kazimira Prunskienė resigned due to rising prices, Šimėnas became the Prime Minister of a largely unchanged government. However, as the Soviet Army entered Vilnius and surrounded key buildings, Šimėnas disappeared. In an emergency session, Gediminas Vagnorius took over his cabinet and became the Prime Minister. Šimėnas suddenly reappeared on 14 January. He joined Vagnorius' government as the Minister of Economy on 30 May 1991 and served until the government resigned on 21 July 1992. In 1994, he joined the Lithuanian Christian Democratic Party and was elected to the Seventh Seimas in 1996. He ran unsuccessfully in the 2004 Seimas and European Parliament elections, after which he joined the private sector.

Šimėnas published several academic papers on economy and a monograph about economic reforms in Lithuania from 1990 to 1994.

Preceded by Kazimira Prunskienė	Prime Minister of Lithuania; 10 January 1991 – 13 January 1991	Succeeded by Gediminas Vagnorius
