= Eugenijus Gentvilas =

Lithuanian politician (born 1960)

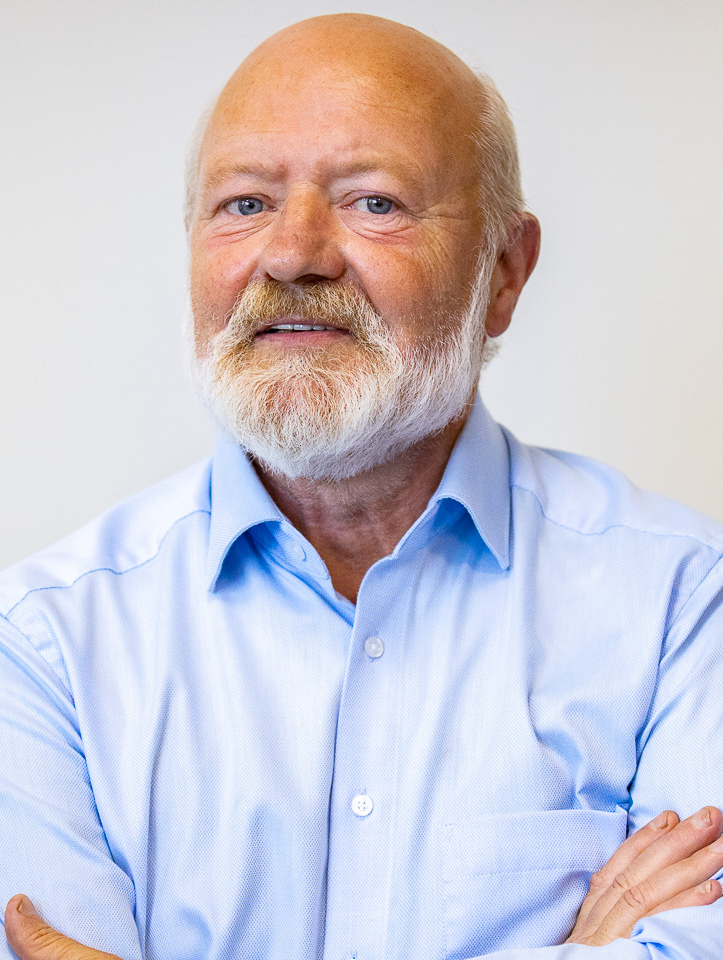

Member of Seimas
- Incumbent
- Assumed office 17 November 2012
- Constituency: Multi-member

Acting Prime Minister of Lithuania
- In office 20 June 2001 – 3 July 2001
- President: Valdas Adamkus
- Preceded by: Rolandas Paksas
- Succeeded by: Algirdas Mykolas Brazauskas

Minister of Economy of Lithuania
- In office 15 February 2001 – 12 July 2001
- Prime Minister: Rolandas Paksas
- Preceded by: Valentinas Milaknis
- Succeeded by: Petras Čėsna

Leader of the Liberal Union of Lithuania
- In office 1996–1999
- Preceded by: Ginutis Vencius
- Succeeded by: Rolandas Paksas
- In office 2001–2003
- Preceded by: Rolandas Paksas

Member of the European Parliament for Lithuania
- In office 2004–2009

Mayor of Klaipėda
- In office 1997–2001

Personal details
- Born: 14 March 1960 (age 66) Telšiai, then part of Lithuanian SSR, Soviet Union
- Party: Liberal Union of Lithuania (1993–2003); Liberal and Centre Union (2003–2006); Liberal Movement (2006–present)
- Spouse: Aušra
- Children: Simonas; 2 daughters
- Education: Vilnius University

Eugenijus Gentvilas (born 14 March 1960 in Telšiai) is a Lithuanian politician, signatory of the Act of the Re-Establishment of the State of Lithuania and Member of the European Parliament for the Liberal and Centre Union (Liberal Movement since 2006), sitting with the Alliance of Liberals and Democrats for Europe. He was mayor of Klaipėda from 1997 to 2001. In mid-2001, Gentvilas briefly acted as Prime Minister of Lithuania.

== Biography ==
Eugenijus Gentvilas was born on 14 March 1960 in Telšai. In 1978, he graduated from Baisogal Secondary School in the Radviliškis District Municipality. In 1983, Eugenijus graduated from the Faculty of Natural Sciences of Vilnius University, majoring in geography. In 1993, he defended his doctoral dissertation on the topic “Main features of epigenesis of the Lithuanian glaciogenic relief.” In 1983–1990, he worked at the Lithuanian Academy of Sciences and from 1993 to 1996 at Klaipeda University.

During 1990–1992, Eugenijus Gentvilas served as a member of the Supreme Council – Reconstituent Seimas, where he played a pivotal role in signing the Act of the Re-Establishment of the State of Lithuania. In the subsequent years of 1991–1992, Gentvilas held the position of Speaker of the Seimas. In 1997, he secured the position of mayor of Klaipeda, effectively leading the city until 2001.

Gentvilas transitioned to national governance when he assumed the role of Minister of Economy of Lithuania from February to July 2001. On 20 June that year he was appointed as the acting Prime Minister of Lithuania, maintaining this position until 3 July.

From 2004 to 2009, Gentvilas extended his political reach by becoming a member of the European Parliament. Subsequently, he served as the general director of the state enterprise Port of Klaipėda from 2009 to 2012.

Between 1995 and 2004, as well as from 2009 to 2012, Eugenijus Gentvilas served as a member of the Klaipeda City Council. Subsequently, from 2012 to 2016, he took on the role of deputy during the 11th convocation of the Seimas of Lithuania.

In 2016, Gentvilas secured a place in the 12th convocation of the Seimas. During this period, he vied for the position of Speaker of the Seimas, ultimately losing to Viktoras Pranckietis, despite garnering 36 parliamentary votes.

A significant turning point in Gentvilas' political career occurred on 9 December 2017, when he was elected as the chairman of the Liberal Movement by a narrow margin of one vote. He received support from 330 party members, narrowly surpassing his opponent, Vitalius Gailius, the chairman of the anti-corruption commission of the parliament, who garnered 329 votes.

== Personal life ==
He has been awarded the orders of France, Norway, and Latvia. Author of about 20 scientific and about 500 journalistic articles. He has a wife, Aušra, with whom he has a son Simonas, and daughters Rūta and Rasa. His sister is Virginija Baltraitienė.

Preceded by Rolandas Paksas	Prime Minister of Lithuania (acting); 20 June 2001 – 3 July 2001	Succeeded by Algirdas Brazauskas
Preceded by Silverijus Šukys	Mayor of Klaipėda; 1997–2001	Succeeded by Rimantas Taraškevičius
