= Virginija Baltraitienė =

Lithuanian politician

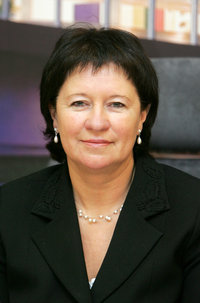

Minister of Agriculture
- In office 17 July 2014 – 13 December 2016
- Preceded by: Vigilijus Jukna
- Succeeded by: Bronius Markauskas

Personal details
- Born: 4 March 1958 (age 68) Želvaičiai, Lithuania
- Party: Labour Party
- Education: Lietuvos žemės ūkio akademija

Virginija Baltraitienė is a Lithuanian politician and public figure, she was formerly (2014–2016) the Minister of Agriculture in the Butkevičius Cabinet. She is the Vice Mayor of the Kėdainiai district.

== Biography ==
Baltraitienė was born in Žalvės on March 4, 1958. Her younger brother is the Liberal's Movement politician Eugenijus Gentvilas. She graduated from Baisogalos High School in 1976, before attending the Lithuaninan Academy of Agriculture where she graduated with a degree in 1981.

Baltraitienė worked in various roles as an economist, becoming the Head of the Economic and Budgetary Division of the Kėdainiai District Municipal Administration in 1997, and the Director of the Kėdainiai District Municipal Administration in 1999. In 2005, Baltraitienė became the Mayor of Kėdainiai District Municipality. From 2014 to 2016, Baltraitienė served as the Labour Party's Minister of Agriculture as part of Prime Minister Algirdas Butkevičius' cabinet.

From 2017, Baltraitienė served as Head of the General Affairs Division of the National Food and Veterinary Risk Assessment Institute.
