= Rimvydas Turčinskas =

Minister of Health of Lithuania
- In office 12 July 2006 – 28 June 2008
- Preceded by: Žilvinas Padaiga
- Succeeded by: Gediminas Černiauskas

Personal details
- Born: 25 February 1956 (age 70) Kazlų Rūda, Lithuania
- Party: LSDP
- Occupation: Politician

Rimvydas Turčinskas (born 25 February 1956 in Kazlų Rūda, Lithuania) is a Lithuanian politician, doctor, and, from 2006 to 2008, the health minister of Lithuania in the government of Gediminas Kirkilas.

== Biography ==
In 1980, Turčinskas graduated from the Medical Institute in Kaunas with a specialization in the field of trauma surgery.

In 1981, he started working in the Central District Hospital in Marijampolė. He was their surgeon from 1981 to 1983, and was also their deputy chief doctor for medical services from 1983 to 1985, their deputy chief doctor for treatment from 1985 to 1989, and finally, their physician-in-chief from 1989 to 1998. From 1998 to 2004, he held the position of Director of Hospital in Marijampolė.

Since 2003 he belonged to the Labour Party. In 2004, he was elected from the list of groups to the Seimas. In 2006–2007, he was a member of the Civic Democratic Party. Since 2007, he has the represented the Lithuanian Social Democratic Party.

On 12 July 2006, he was appointed minister of health of Lithuania. On June 18, 2008, however, he resigned from his position in connection with the criticism of the activities of former Lithuanian President Valdas Adamkus. 10 days later, the resignation was accepted by the president.

In parliamentary elections in 2008, he unsuccessfully applied for a parliamentary seat on behalf of the Social Democrats. In 2009, he became an adviser to the director of the Vilnius University Hospital Ambulance Service.
