= Gintaras Balčiūnas =

Lithuanian lawyer

Gintaras Balčiūnas (born April 2, 1964 in Lithuania) is a Lithuanian lawyer, a partner at the law firm Balčiūnas & Grajauskas, and an expert in litigation and arbitration.

In 1989 Gintaras Balčiūnas graduated from Vilnius University, the Faculty of Law. During his professional career Gintaras Balčiūnas was managing partner and one of the founders of the law firm Jurevičius, Balčiūnas & Bartkus (2000–2009), the Minister of Justice of the Republic of Lithuania (9th Government and 10th Government).

Gintaras Balčiūnas took an active part in drafting the legislation of the Republic of Lithuania. He was the head of the working group drafting the Law on the Approval, Enforcement and Implementation of the Civil Code of the Republic of Lithuania, led the working group drafting the Law on the Register of Property Seizure Acts, the working group drafting the Law on the Legal Aid.

Since 1989 he has been teaching at Mykolas Romeris University.

During his legal practice Gintaras Balčiūnas has advised a large number of public institutions, municipalities, local and foreign private companies and natural persons.

Gintaras Balčiūnas is listed as a recommended arbitrator of Vilnius Court of Commercial Arbitration.

Gintaras Balčiūnas is also a member of Vilnius Rotary Club and Vilnius Leaders' Club.
