= Gintautas Bartkus =

Lithuanian politician (born 1966)

Minister of Justice
- In office 9 November 2000 – 12 July 2001
- Prime Minister: Rolandas Paksas
- Preceded by: Gintaras Balčiūnas
- Succeeded by: Vytautas Markevičius

Personal details
- Born: 13 June 1966 (age 59)
- Party: Independent

Gintautas Bartkus (born 13 June 1966) is a Lithuanian lawyer and politician who served as minister of justice from 2000 to 2001. He was one of the candidates considered by the Liberals' Movement for minister of justice in 2008, and was proposed as minister of justice by the Dawn of Nemunas in 2024.
