= Rimvydas Raimondas Survila =

Lithuanian politician (born 1939)

Rimvydas Raimondas Survila (born 5 December 1939 in Šiauliai) is a Lithuanian politician. In 1990, he was among those who signed the Act of the Re-Establishment of the State of Lithuania.
