= Gediminas Černiauskas =

Lithuanian economist and politician

Minister of Health of Lithuania
- In office 14 July 2008 – 9 December 2008
- Preceded by: Rimvydas Turčinskas
- Succeeded by: Algis Čaplikas

Personal details
- Born: 15 May 1957 (age 68) Vilnius, Lithuania
- Party: LSDP
- Occupation: Politician

Gediminas Černiauskas (born 15 May 1957 in Vilnius) is a Lithuanian economist and politician, and, for a brief time in 2008, the Lithuanian Health Minister in the government of Gediminas Kirkilas.

In 1980, he graduated from Vilnius University with a specialization in the field of industrial planning. From 1983 to 1986, he studied for a doctorate at the Institute of Economics of the University of Vilnius.

From 1980 to 1983, he worked as a lecturer at the University of Vilnius, and then, until 1990, he was a researcher at the Institute of Economics of the Lithuanian Academy of Sciences. From 1990 to 1993, he worked in the Ministry of Health as director of the Economics. From the years 1993 to 2001, he was the director of the company "Sveikatos ekonomikos centro" ("Centre for Health Economics").

From 2001 to 2004, Černiauskas served as deputy minister of health. From 2004 to 2007, he was an assistant professor at the Mykolas Romeris University in Vilnius. In 2007, he was advisor to the Prime Minister, and then returned to the position of deputy minister of health. On July 14, 2008, was nominated as the head of this department.

In the parliamentary elections in the same year, he unsuccessfully applied for a parliamentary seat on behalf of the Social Democrats and on 9 December 2008, he ended tenure as Minister.
