= New Union (Social Liberals) =

New Union (Social Liberals) Naujoji sąjunga (socialliberalai)
- Founded: 25 April 1998
- Dissolved: 9 July 2011
- Merged into: Labour Party
- Headquarters: 10/1 Gedimino pr., Vilnius
- Ideology: Social liberalism Populism
- Political position: Centre-left
- European affiliation: European Liberal Democrat and Reform Party (2004–2011)
- International affiliation: Liberal International (observer)
- Colours: Blue, white

Party flag

Website
- www.nsajunga.lt

The New Union (Social Liberals) (Lithuanian: Naujoji sąjunga (socialliberalai), NS) was a social-liberal political party in Lithuania. The NS was a member of the European Liberal Democrat and Reform Party (ELDR) and an observer of the Liberal International. It was founded in 1998 and is led by Artūras Paulauskas.

== History ==
=== Establishment and participation in government (1998–2006) ===
The party was formed in 1998 on a basis of Artūras Paulauskas presidential campaign team.

Its policy was based on social liberalism: the principal values of which are personal freedom, social solidarity, welfare of people and justice.

In 2000, municipal elections the party won the most seats in municipalities districts' councils.

In 2000, it formed a coalition government with the Liberal Union (along with Lithuanian Centre Union and Modern Christian Democrats), but after disagreements between two, in 2001, a new coalition with the Lithuanian Social Democratic Party (LSDP) was formed.

Its candidate Vilija Blinkevičiūtė won 16.6% of the votes in the 2004 presidential election. At that year's parliamentary election, the party ran in alliance with the Social Democratic Party (LSDP) under the label 'Coalition of Algirdas Brazauskas and Artūras Paulauskas: Working for Lithuania'. The list won 31 seats out of 141, of which the New Union won 11. After these elections, a coalition with the LSDP, the Labour Party and Lithuanian Popular Peasant Union (LVLS), which lasted up until summer of 2006.

=== In opposition, in government and dissolution (2006–2011) ===
In January 2008, the party joined new coalition, which consisted from the LSDP, the LVLS, Civic Democratic Party and Liberal and Centre Union.

At the 2008 parliamentary election, the party lost heavily, winning only one seat in the Seimas and only 3.64% of the national vote. As other parties that were part of coalition governments in the outgoing parliament suffered in the elections (Social Democratic Party of Lithuania, Labour Party, Liberal and Centre Union and Lithuanian Peasant Popular Union), all lost seats in the Seimas and in the new parliament a centre-right coalition under Andrius Kubilius had the most seats. It left the New Union in opposition.

The party's one member in the Seimas, Valerijus Simulik, sat with the Social Democratic Party political group. In 2011, the party merged with the Labour Party. A minority faction switched to the Liberal and Centre Union.

== Election results ==
=== Seimas ===
Election	Leader	Votes (Note: Proportional representation votes.)	%	Seats	+/–	Government
2000	Artūras Paulauskas	288,895	19.64 (#2)	29 / 141	New	Coalition
2004	Artūras Paulauskas	246,852 (Note: Participated in Coalition "Working for Lithuania" (along with Social Democratic Party of Lithuania))	20.65 (#2)	11 / 141	▼18	Coalition (2004–2006)
2004	Artūras Paulauskas	246,852	20.65 (#2)	11 / 141	▼18	Opposition (2006–2008)
2004	Artūras Paulauskas	246,852	20.65 (#2)	11 / 141	▼18	Coalition (2008)
2008	Algirdas Monkevičius	45,061	3.64 (#10)	1 / 141	▼10	Opposition (2008–2011)

== Leaders ==
- Artūras Paulauskas (1998−2008, 2009−2011)
- Algirdas Monkevičius (2008−2009)

== See also ==
- Liberalism in Lithuania
