= Algirdas Saudargas =

Lithuanian politician

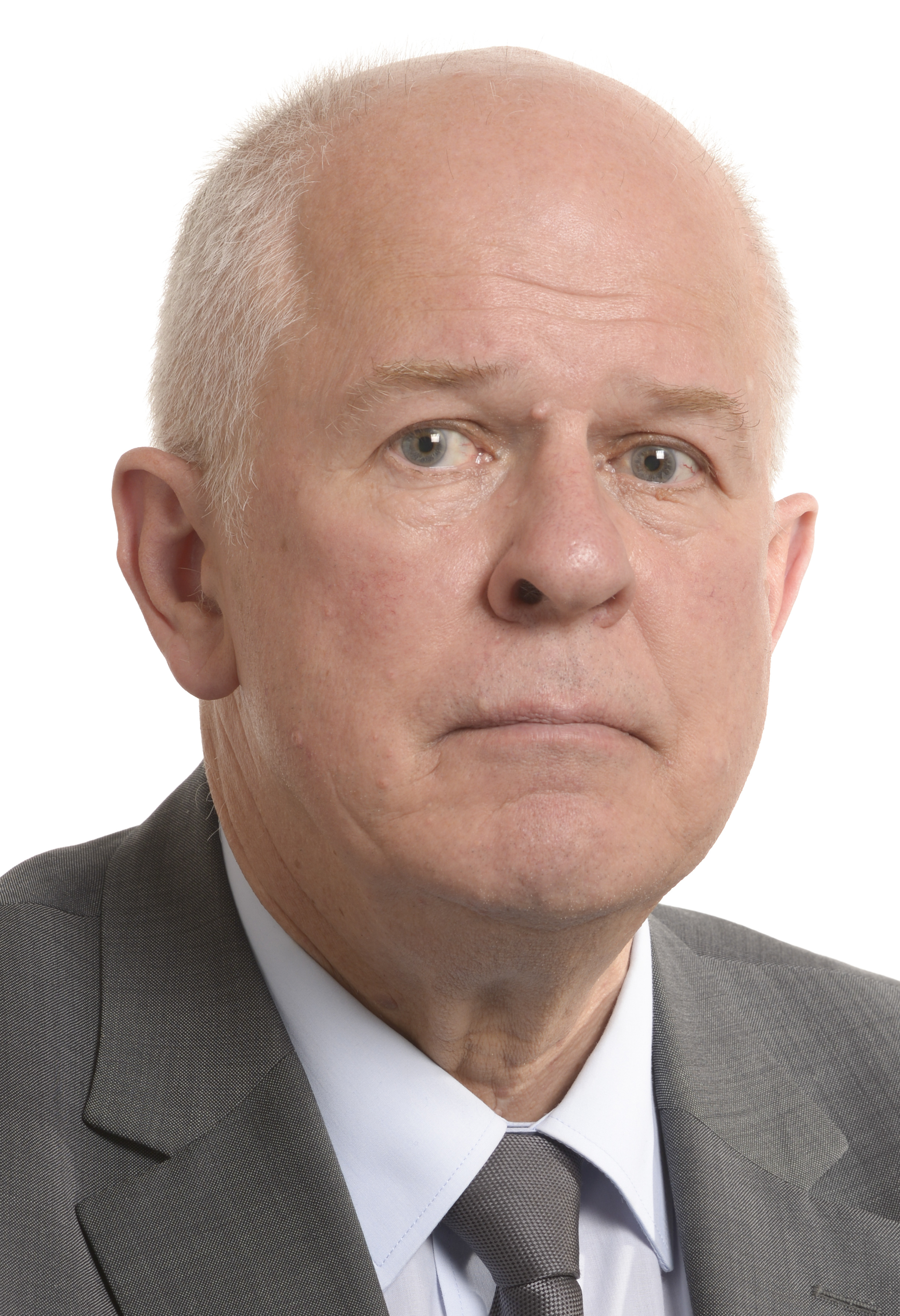

17th Minister of Foreign Affairs
- In office 11 April 1990 – 17 December 1992
- Prime Minister: Kazimira Prunskienė; Albertas Šimėnas; Gediminas Vagnorius; Aleksandras Abišala
- Preceded by: Stasys Antanas Bačkis (as head of the Lithuanian Diplomatic Service)
- Succeeded by: Povilas Gylys

19th Minister of Foreign Affairs
- In office 10 December 1996 – 9 November 2000
- Prime Minister: Gediminas Vagnorius; Rolandas Paksas; Andrius Kubilius
- Preceded by: Povilas Gylys
- Succeeded by: Antanas Valionis

Personal details
- Born: 17 April 1948 (age 78) Kaunas, Lithuania
- Party: Homeland Union; European People's Party
- Children: 2 incl. Paulius Saudargas
- Education: Kaunas Institute of Medicine

Algirdas Saudargas (born April 17, 1948) is a Lithuanian politician and the signatory of the Act of the Re-Establishment of the State of Lithuania. He was the first foreign minister of Lithuania after it regained independence.

== Biography ==
In 1966, he completed his secondary education at Saulė High School in Kaunas. He then went on to graduate from the Kaunas Institute of Medicine in 1972 with a degree in biophysics. Between 1972 and 1977, he held the position of junior research fellow at the Lithuanian Academy of Sciences' Institute of Physics and Mathematics. From 1977 to 1982, he worked as a senior lecturer at the Lithuanian Academy of Agriculture, and from 1982 to 1986 he was a Senior Research Fellow at the Kaunas Branch of the Institute for Biological Research of Chemical Compounds. From 1986 to 1990, he was a Senior Research Fellow at the Central Research Laboratory, Neurosurgery Laboratory of the Kaunas Institute of Medicine.

== Political career ==
Since 1988 Saudargas has been an active member of Sąjūdis. In 1989 he was one of the re-establishers of the Lithuanian Christian Democratic Party. In 1990 he led the Christian Democrat list in the Supreme Council elections and was elected to the Supreme Council of the Republic of Lithuania.

He served as a Minister of Foreign Affairs from April 11, 1990, to December 17, 1992, and again from December 4, 1996, to October 30, 2000. In his first term as foreign minister Saudargas has contributed to Lithuania's international recognition and involvement in international organisations. In 1992, Algirdas Saudargas, together with 9 other Baltic Ministers of Foreign Affairs and an EU commissioner, founded the Council of the Baltic Sea States (CBSS) and the EuroFaculty.

From 2009 until 2019 Saudargas was elected to the European Parliament.

Seimas
New constituency	Member of the Seimas for Vilijampolė; 1990–1992	Succeeded by Arimantas Juvencijus Raškinis (Aleksotas-Vilijampolė)
Preceded by Rytas Kupčinskas	Member of the Seimas for Aleksotas-Vilijampolė; 2000–2004	Succeeded by Rytas Kupčinskas
Preceded by Stasys Lozoraitis Jr. as Chief of Lithuanian Diplomatic Service	Minister of Foreign Affairs of the Republic of Lithuania; 1990–1992	Succeeded by Povilas Gylys
Preceded by Povilas Gylys	Minister of Foreign Affairs of the Republic of Lithuania; 1996–2000	Succeeded by Antanas Valionis
