= Civic Democratic Party (Lithuania) =

Civic Democratic Party Pilietinės demokratijos partija
- Abbreviation: PDP
- Founded: 1996
- Dissolved: 2025
- Split from: Labour Party
- Ideology: Liberal conservatism
- Political position: Centre-right

The Civic Democratic Party (Lithuanian: Pilietinės demokratijos partija, PDP) was a liberal conservative political party in Lithuania which lasted between 2006 and reorganized in 2011.

== History ==
The party was established on 29 July 1996, and was originally known as the Alliance of the Lithuanian Minorities (Lietuvos tautinių mažumų aljansas). In the 1996 parliamentary elections, it received 3% of the vote, and initially failed to win a seat. Shortly after the elections, the party was renamed the Lithuanian Citizens' Alliance (Lithuanian: Lietuvos piliečių aljansas, LPA).

In the following year by-elections that were held in the four constituencies where the turnout had been below the threshold to validate the results of the 1996 elections, the party representative Mečislav Vaškovič got elected to Seimas from the Naujoji Vilnia constituency.

In the 1997 municipal elections, the party's best performance came in Vilnius, where Juozas Raistenskis became deputy mayor, and Visaginas. Between 1999 and 2000 many party members (including Raistenskis) joined the Liberal Union of Lithuania. In the 2000 municipal elections, the party won three seats in Visaginas.

In 2005 the party was renamed as the Lithuanian Citizens Union (Lietuvos piliečių sąjunga), and then subsequently transformed into the Civic Democratic Party, originally the Civic Democratic Group, on 2 May 2006 during the Ninth Seimas political term. It was formed by eleven members, eight of them being former members of the Labour Party who had left and some who had been in the party for 20 years.

In May 2008, Algimantas Matulevičius was elected chairman of the party.

In 2011, the party was reorganized into the Union of National Unity.

== Election results ==
Election	Votes	%	Source
2008 parliamentary election	13,775	1.11	
2009 European Parliament election	7,425	1.31	
