= Algimantas Nasvytis =

Lithuanian architect (1928–2018)

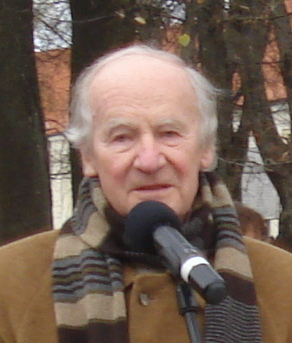
Algimantas Nasvytis

Algimantas Nasvytis (8 April 1928 – 27 July 2018) was a Lithuanian architect. He was active in the pro-independence Sąjūdis movement and served as Minister of Construction and Urban Development in the first four Cabinets of Lithuania after Lithuania declared independence from the Soviet Union.

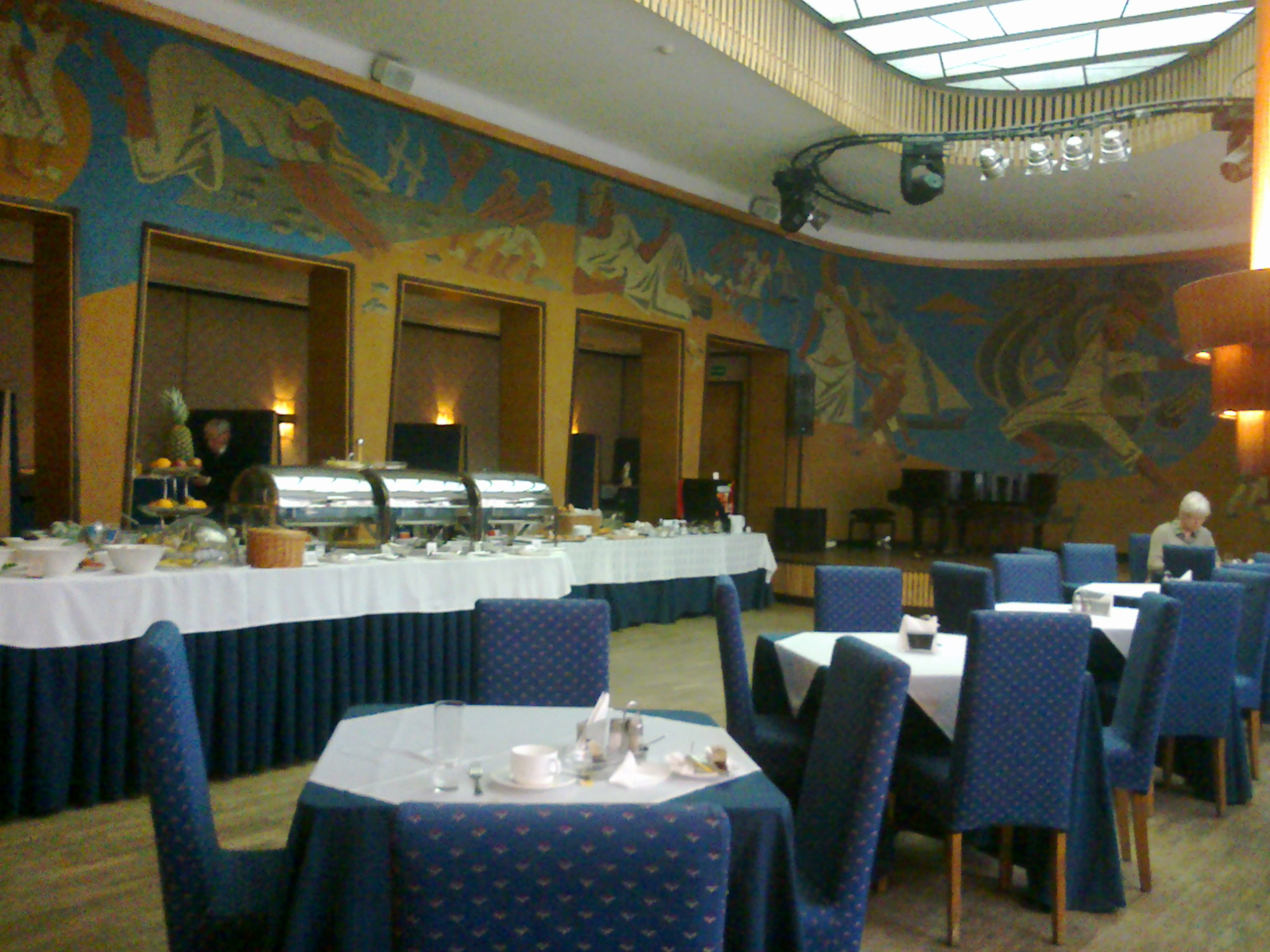
Neringa restaurant in Vilnius, architect Algimantas Nasvytis

In 1946 Nasvytis enrolled into the State Art Institute of Lithuania (now Vilnius Academy of Art). Some of his works include Neringa cafe and hotel in Vilnius (1960), detailed zoning plans for Vilnius (1971–1979), Seimas Palace (1982), Lithuanian National Drama Theatre (1982), Hotel Lietuva (1983), White Bridge across Neris (1995), Akropolis/Vilnius (2002). Nasvytis often cooperated with his twin brother Vytautas Nasvytis. In 1978, Nasvytis began teaching at the Vilnius Gediminas Technical University and in 1993 earned the title of professor. From 1993 to 1996 he was the chairman of the Lithuanian Architects' Union.
