= Gediminas Vagnorius =

Lithuanian politician

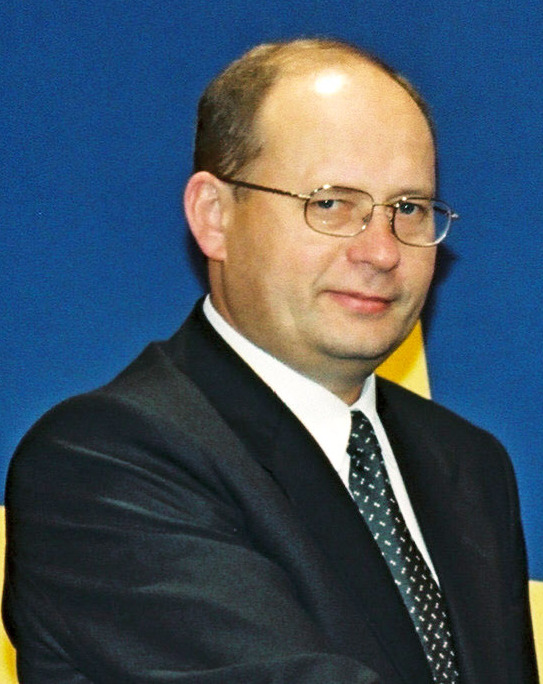
- Vagnorius in 1998

3rd Prime Minister of Lithuania
- In office 4 December 1996 – 3 May 1999
- President: Algirdas Brazauskas; Valdas Adamkus
- Preceded by: Laurynas Mindaugas Stankevičius
- Succeeded by: Rolandas Paksas
- In office 13 January 1991 – 21 July 1992
- President: Algirdas Brazauskas
- Preceded by: Albertas Šimėnas
- Succeeded by: Aleksandras Abišala

Personal details
- Born: 10 June 1957 (age 69) Plungė District Municipality, Lithuanian SSR, Soviet Union
- Party: Homeland Union
- Other political affiliations: Sąjūdis
- Spouse: Nijolė Songailaitė-Vagnorienė
- Children: 2
- Parent(s): Mother: Oktavija Jokubauskaitė-Vagnorienė; Father: Zenonas Vagnorius
- Education: Vilnius Gediminas Technical University

Gediminas Vagnorius (born 10 June 1957) is a Lithuanian politician and signatory of the Act of the Re-Establishment of the State of Lithuania. He served as the Prime Minister of Lithuania from 1991 to 1992 and from 1996 to 1999.

== Premiership ==
Vagnorius was first appointed as Prime Minister by the Supreme Council – Reconstituent Seimas on 13 January 1991, having been a member of the body's presidium since its founding. He led his government until July 1992, when Sąjūdis was defeated in the 1992 Lithuanian parliamentary election by the post-communist and social democratic Democratic Labour Party (Lithuanian: Lietuvos demokratinė darbo partija, LDDP).

Following the 1992 election, Vagnorius was elected leader of the Homeland Union party in 1993. Along with Vytautas Landsbergis, he was an influential figure in the party while it was out of power, occasionally causing conflict with other Homeland Union members; Vincas Laurutis, a member of the Šiauliai City Council, alleged in May 1995 that Vagnorius and Landsbergis had insisted that independent Alfredas Lankauskas be the party's mayoral candidate, rather than leader of the local party branch, allegations that Lankauskas never denied.

Vagnorius led the Homeland Union to victory in the 1996 Lithuanian parliamentary election, forming a coalition with the Lithuanian Christian Democratic Party. After taking office, Vagnorius's government sought to limit the powers of President Algirdas Brazauskas (who was from the LDDP), emphasising the constitutional limits of Brazauskas's presidency after four years during which he had closely cooperated with the LDDP-majority Seimas. After the 1998 election of Valdas Adamkus as president, Adamkus set out to strengthen the presidency to avoid Brazauskas's later political weakness, and he expressed a desire to act as a "counterweight" to the Seimas, rather than supporting it.

Vagnorius's government sought to enforce fiscal discipline, proposing a balanced budget amendment to the Constitution of Lithuania in 1997 that was ultimately never adopted. Governments after Vagnorius's would later define deficit-free budgets as goals to be reached. The first such deficit-free budget, under Vagnorius's government in 1999, ultimately became the source of Lithuania's worst budgetary deficit in post-Soviet history (8.6% of the country's gross domestic product), as a result of overly-optimistic assumptions on GDP growth, domestic instability causing in a failure to react to spillovers of the 1998 Russian financial crisis and a refusal to raise taxes, as the International Monetary Fund recommended.

== Resignation and legacy ==
The Lithuanian economy crashed in 1998 as a result of the Russian financial crisis. Following the economic crash, Vagnorius's government was engaged in a public feud with Adamkus over whether to conduct economic reforms; Vagnorius rejected such moves, while Adamkus rallied his high levels of popular support to advocate for the government's dismissal. Due to the fact that Adamkus's popularity far eclipsed that of the government (80% against the government's 20%), Vagnorius ultimately chose to resign. Following Vagnorius's resignation, Adamkus manoeuvered for Rolandas Paksas to succeed him as Prime Minister.

After Lithuania regained its independence in 1990, its temporary currency, the Lithuanian talonas, was popularly known as vagnorkė or vagnorėlis after Vagnorius' name.

Preceded by Albertas Šimėnas	Prime Minister of Lithuania; 13 January 1991 – 21 July 1992	Succeeded by Aleksandras Abišala
Preceded by Laurynas Mindaugas Stankevičius	Prime Minister of Lithuania; 15 February 1996 – 4 May 1999	Succeeded by Irena Degutienė (acting)
