= Zigmantas Balčytis =

Lithuanian politician

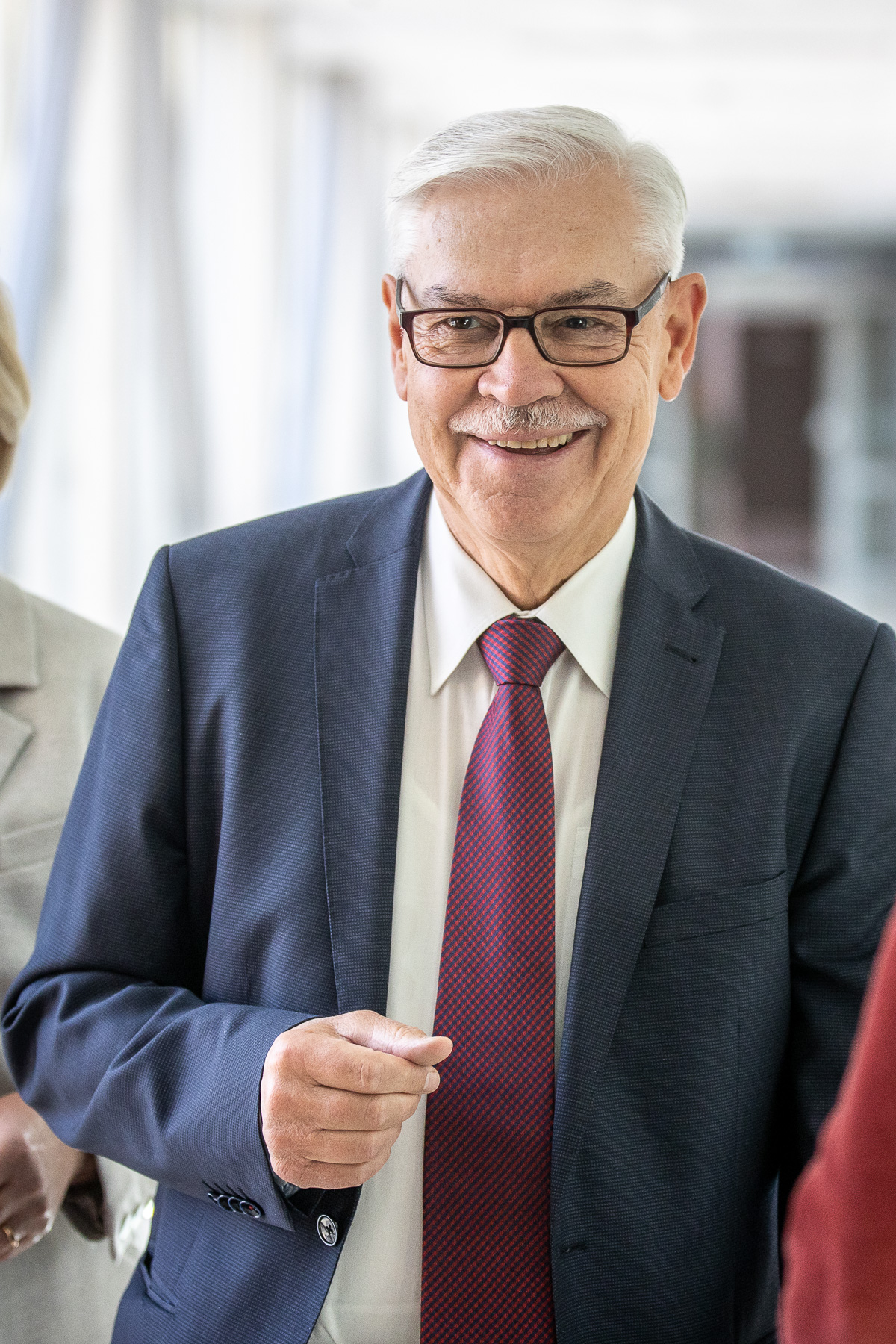
- Balčytis in 2023

Member of European Parliament
- In office 4 June 2009 – 1 July 2019

Member of the Seimas
- Incumbent
- Assumed office 13 November 2020
- Preceded by: Alfredas Stasys Nausėda
- Constituency: Šilutė
- In office 19 October 2000 – 3 June 2009
- Preceded by: Alfonsas Bartkus
- Succeeded by: Remigijus Žemaitaitis
- Constituency: Šilalė–Šilutė

Minister of Finance
- In office 1 June 2005 – 4 July 2007
- Prime Minister: Gediminas Kirkilas
- Preceded by: Algirdas Brazauskas
- Succeeded by: Gediminas Kirkilas

Minister of Transport and Communications
- In office 1 June 2001 – 4 July 2005
- Prime Minister: Algirdas Brazauskas
- Preceded by: Dailis Alfonsas Barakauskas
- Succeeded by: Petras Čėsna

Personal details
- Born: 16 November 1953 (age 72) Šilutė, then part of Lithuanian SSR, Soviet Union
- Party: Social Democratic Party (2000—2021); Union of Democrats "For Lithuania" (2022—present)
- Education: Vilnius University

Zigmantas Balčytis (born 16 November 1953) is a Lithuanian politician who briefly served as acting Prime Minister of Lithuania in 2006. He took office on 1 June 2006 following the resignation of Algirdas Brazauskas, but failed to be approved by the Parliament to become prime minister. He was succeeded on 4 July by Gediminas Kirkilas. Balčytis was a member of the Social Democratic Party of Lithuania (LSDP) until 2021 and was Minister of Finance in the Brazauskas government from 2005 to 2007.

On 19 October 2021, Balčytis left the LSDP and joined the newly formed Seimas parliamentary group led by former Prime Minister Saulius Skvernelis. Balčytis has been a member of the Union of Democrats "For Lithuania" since its creation in 2022.

Political offices
Preceded by Algirdas Brazauskas	Prime Minister of Lithuania; 2006	Succeeded by Gediminas Kirkilas
Seimas
Preceded by Alfonsas Bartkus	Member of the Seimas for Šilalė and Šilutė; 2000–2012	Succeeded by Remigijus Žemaitaitis
Preceded by Alfredas S. Nausėda	Member of the Seimas for Šilutė; 2020–present	Incumbent
Party political offices
Preceded by Algirdas Butkevičius	Social Democratic Party nominee for President of Lithuania; 2014	Succeeded by Vytenis Andriukaitis
