= Algirdas Monkevičius =

Lithuanian politician

Personal details
- Born: 29 March 1956 (age 69) Rietavas, Lithuania
- Party: New Union (Social Liberals)
- Spouse: Jovita Monkevičienė
- Children: Tadas, Algirdas, Audronė

Algirdas Monkevičius (born 29 March 1956) is a teacher and Lithuanian politician, who is the former Minister of Education and Science.

== Biography ==
In 1974 he finished Rietavas secondary school, and in 1979 Šiauliai Pedagogical Institute, Physics and mathematics faculty and started working as a teacher. Later Monkevičius continued his studies in Moscow.

Monkevičius has been a member of New Union (Social Liberals) since 2000, and with this party he was elected a member of Seimas in 2000–2004 and in 2004–2008, was Minister of Education in three Cabinets of Lithuania.

Preceded by Kornelijus Platelis	Minister of Education and Science of Lithuania; 2000–2004	Succeeded by Remigijus Motuzas
Preceded by Roma Žakaitienė	Minister of Education and Science of Lithuania; 2008	Succeeded by -
