= Petras Čėsna =

Lithuanian politician (born 1945)

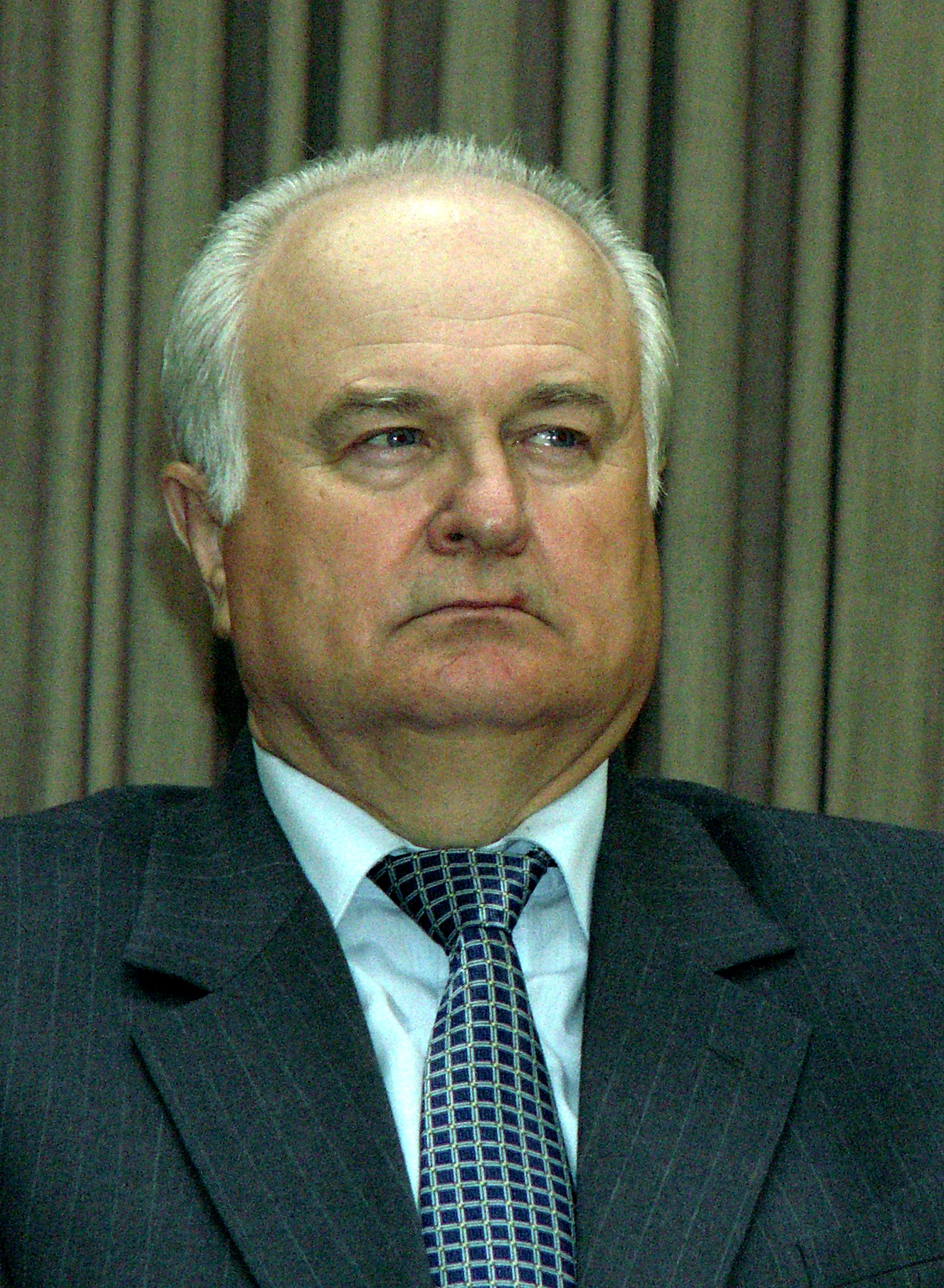
Čėsna in 2007

Petras Čėsna (born 20 February 1945) is a Lithuanian politician. He served as Minister of Transport and Communications from 10 June 2005 to 18 July 2006.

He previously served as Minister of Economy from 12 July 2001 to 14 December 2004.
