= Kęstutis Navickas (born 1970) =

Lithuanian politician

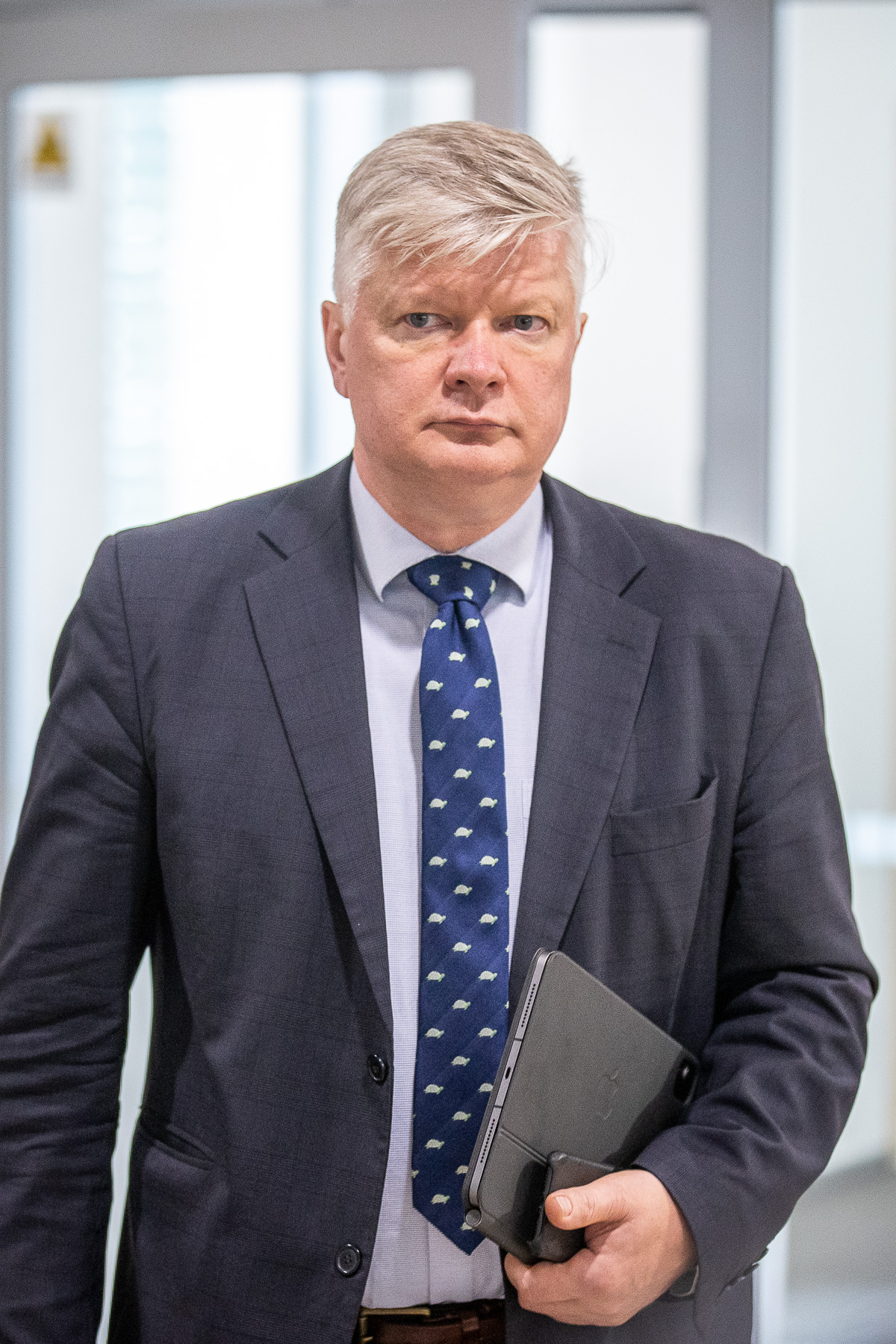
- Navickas in 2023

Minister of Agriculture
- In office 11 December 2020 – 13 August 2024
- Prime Minister: Ingrida Šimonytė
- Preceded by: Andrius Palionis
- Succeeded by: Kazys Starkevičius

Member of the Seimas
- Incumbent
- Assumed office 18 April 2023
- Preceded by: Mykolas Majauskas
- Constituency: Multi-member

Minister of Environment
- In office 13 December 2016 – 7 December 2018
- Prime Minister: Saulius Skvernelis
- Preceded by: Kęstutis Trečiokas
- Succeeded by: Kęstutis Mažeika

Personal details
- Born: 13 June 1970 (age 56) Kaunas, Lithuania
- Party: Homeland Union (2020-present); Independent (2016–2020)
- Education: Vilnius University; Mykolas Romeris University

Kęstutis Navickas (born 13 June 1970) is a Lithuanian politician and environmentalist. Navickas served as the Minister of Environment in the Skvernelis Cabinet from 2016 until 2018.

On 7 December 2020, he was approved to serve as Minister of Agriculture in the Šimonytė Cabinet.

== Biography ==
He attended a secondary school in Kaunas and in 1988 graduated from a vocational technical school, where he specialized as an electrical mechanic.

In 1988, he joined the Kaunas Youth Monument Protection Club "Atgaja". From 1991 to 1992, he worked at a private folk craft school. In 1992, he worked at the Publishing House of Cultural Publications "Taura", where he was responsible for preserving Kaunas Fortress II. From 1992 to 1995, he worked in the Kaunas City Division of the Cultural Heritage Department, where he was responsible for protecting the archaeological and military heritage of Kaunas City. From 1995 to 1998, he served as the Chairman of "Atgaja".

In 1999, he graduated with a bachelor’s degree in history from Vilnius University. In 2009 he graduated from the master’s degree Program in Sustainable Development Management and Administration at Mykolas Romeris University.

From 1998 to 2006, he served as the Director of the Lithuanian branch of the regional environmental center for Central and Eastern Europe. Since 2006, he has been associated with the Baltic Non-Governmental Organization "Baltic Environmental Forum" as Deputy Sustainable Development Expert and Deputy Director.

From 2016 to 2018 was Minister of Environment of Lithuania in the Skvernelis Cabinet.

Since 2019 he has been working in the private sector.

In 2020 he joined Homeland Union and participated in the Seimas elections.

In April 2023, after the Supreme Election Commission revoked the mandate of Mykolas Majauskas as a Member of the Seimas after his resignation, Navickas became a Member of the Seimas.

Political offices
Preceded by Kęstutis Trečiokas	Minister of Environment of Lithuania; 2016–2018	Succeeded by Kęstutis Mažeika
