= Paksas Cabinet I =

Lithuanian government in 1999

- 1999
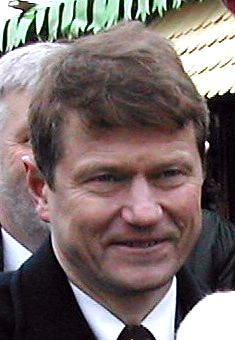
- Date formed: 1 June 1999
- Date dissolved: 11 November 1999

People and organisations
- Head of state: Valdas Adamkus
- Head of government: Rolandas Paksas
- Member parties: Homeland Union, Lithuanian Christian Democratic Party, Lithuanian Centre Union
- Status in legislature: Majority coalition government
- Opposition parties: Democratic Labour Party of Lithuania, Social Democratic Party of Lithuania
- Opposition leader: None

History
- Legislature term: Seventh Seimas
- Predecessor: Vagnorius Cabinet II
- Successor: Kubilius Cabinet I

The First Paksas Cabinet was the 9th cabinet of Lithuania since 1990. It consisted of the Prime Minister and 14 government ministers.

== History ==
Rolandas Paksas of the Homeland Union was appointed the Prime Minister by President Valdas Adamkus on 1 June 1999, after the resignation of the preceding Vagnorius Cabinet. The government received its mandate and started its work on 10 June 1999, after the Seimas gave assent to its program.

The government served for less than five months before it was brought down by disagreements over privatization. The government resigned on 27 October 1999 but continued to serve in an acting capacity (with Irena Degutienė as the acting Prime Minister), until the new Homeland Union government headed by Andrius Kubilius started its work on 11 November 1999.

Rolandas Paksas would later lead another short-lived government between 2000 and 2001.

== Cabinet ==
The following ministers served on the First Paksas Cabinet.

Position	Name	From	To
Prime Minister	Rolandas Paksas	10 June 1999	27 October 1999
Ministry of Agriculture	Edvardas Makelis	10 June 1999	11 November 1999
Ministry of Culture	Arūnas Bėkšta	10 June 1999	11 November 1999
Ministry of Economy	Eugenijus Maldeikis	10 June 1999	11 November 1999
Ministry of Education and Science	Kornelijus Platelis	10 June 1999	11 November 1999
Ministry of Environment	Danius Lygis	10 June 1999	11 November 1999
Ministry of Finance	Jonas Lionginas	10 June 1999	11 November 1999
Ministry of Foreign Affairs	Algirdas Saudargas	10 June 1999	11 November 1999
Ministry of Health	Raimundas Alekna	10 June 1999	11 November 1999
Ministry of the Interior	Česlovas Blažys	10 June 1999	11 November 1999
Ministry of Justice	Gintaras Balčiūnas	10 June 1999	11 November 1999
Ministry of Defence	Česlovas Vytautas Stankevičius	10 June 1999	11 November 1999
Ministry of Social Security and Labour	Irena Degutienė	10 June 1999	11 November 1999
Ministry of Transport and Communications	Rimantas Didžiokas	10 June 1999	11 November 1999
Ministry of Government Reforms and Municipalities	Sigitas Kaktys	10 June 1999	11 November 1999
