= Kubilius Cabinet I =

- 1999–2000
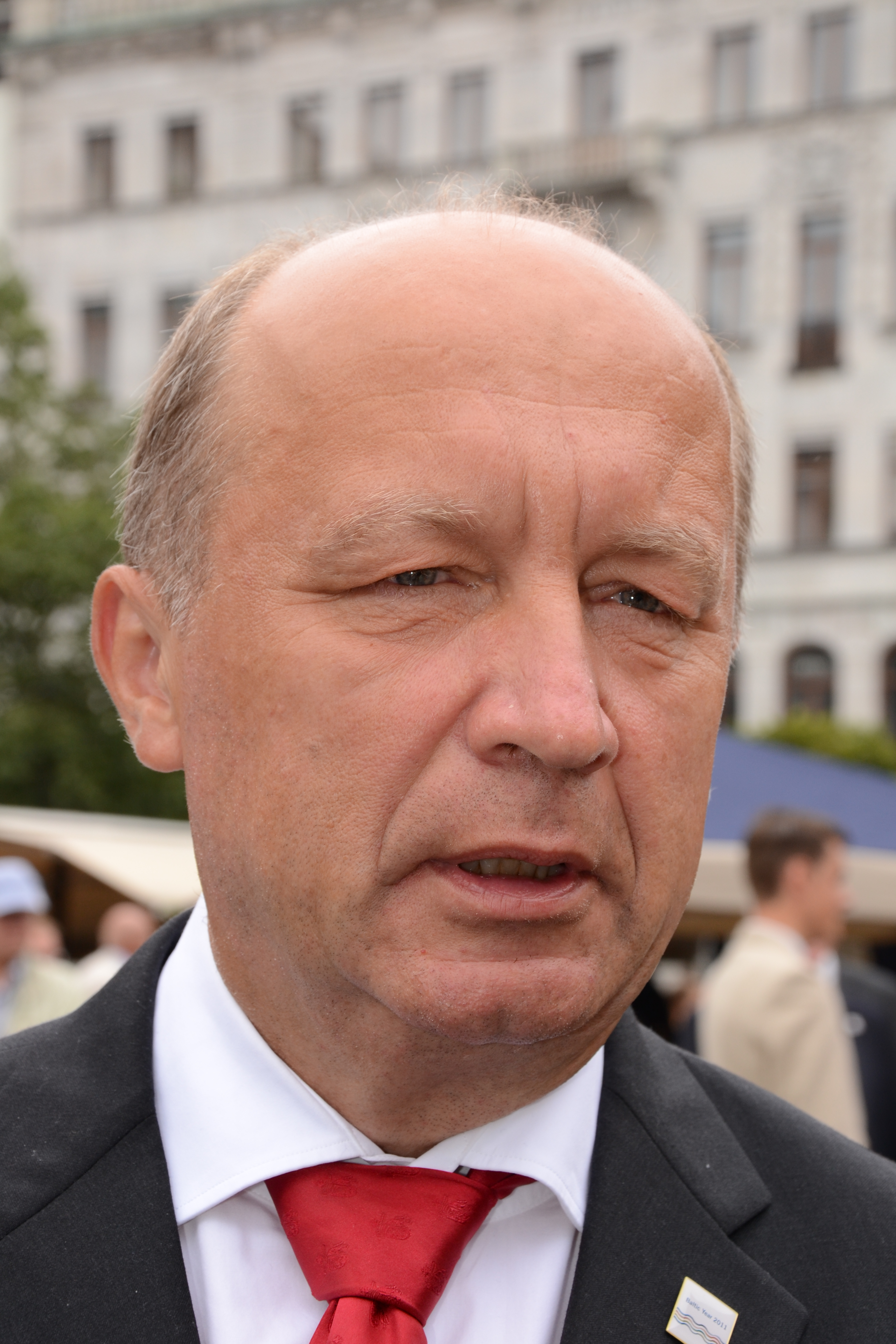
- Date formed: 11 November 1999
- Date dissolved: 9 November 2000

People and organisations
- Head of state: Valdas Adamkus
- Head of government: Andrius Kubilius
- Member parties: Homeland Union, Lithuanian Christian Democratic Party
- Status in legislature: Majority coalition government (1999–2000); Minority caretaker government (2000)
- Opposition parties: Democratic Labour Party of Lithuania, Social Democratic Party of Lithuania, Lithuanian Centre Union (1999–2000) Democratic Labour Party of Lithuania, Social Democratic Party of Lithuania, Socialdemocracy 2000 (2000)
- Opposition leader: None

History
- Legislature term: Seventh Seimas
- Predecessor: Paksas Cabinet I
- Successor: Paksas Cabinet II

The First Kubilius Cabinet was the 10th cabinet of Lithuania since 1990. It consisted of the Prime Minister and 14 government ministers.

== History ==
Andrius Kubilius of the Homeland Union was appointed the Prime Minister by President Valdas Adamkus on 3 November 1999. Kubilius was the third Prime Minister delegated by the ruling Homeland Union during the term of the Seventh Seimas, after Rolandas Paksas resigned amidst disagreements over privatization, causing his government to collapse.

Only 2 ministers and the Prime Minister changed from previous cabinet (later it was joined by Minister of Government Reforms and Municipalities). The government received its mandate and started its work on 11 November 1999, after the Seimas gave assent to its program.

By spring of 2000, Moderates' parliamentary group, which will create Union of Moderate Conservatives, was formed and dissenting members of the Homeland Union (including former Prime Minister Gediminas Vagnorius) joined its ranks. Due to this, government lost majority in Seimas.

The government served until the end of the term of the Seimas, returning its mandate on 19 October 2000, following the elections to Seimas. The government continued to serve in an acting capacity, until the new government formed by Paksas (now leading Liberal Union of Lithuania) started its work on 9 November 2000.

== Cabinet ==
The following ministers served on the First Kubilius Cabinet.

Position	Name	From	To
Prime Minister	Andrius Kubilius	11 November 1999	9 November 2000
Ministry of Agriculture	Edvardas Makelis	11 November 1999	9 November 2000
Ministry of Culture	Arūnas Bėkšta	11 November 1999	9 November 2000
Ministry of Economy	Valentinas Milaknis	11 November 1999	9 November 2000
Ministry of Education and Science	Kornelijus Platelis	11 November 1999	9 November 2000
Ministry of Environment	Danius Lygis	11 November 1999	9 November 2000
Ministry of Finance	Vytautas Dudėnas	11 November 1999	9 November 2000
Ministry of Foreign Affairs	Algirdas Saudargas	11 November 1999	9 November 2000
Ministry of Health	Raimundas Alekna	11 November 1999	9 November 2000
Ministry of the Interior	Česlovas Blažys	11 November 1999	9 November 2000
Ministry of Justice	Gintaras Balčiūnas	11 November 1999	9 November 2000
Ministry of Defence	Česlovas Vytautas Stankevičius	11 November 1999	9 November 2000
Ministry of Social Security and Labour	Irena Degutienė	11 November 1999	9 November 2000
Ministry of Transport and Communications	Rimantas Didžiokas	11 November 1999	9 November 2000
Ministry of Government Reforms and Municipalities	Jonas Rudalevičius	11 November 1999	9 November 2000
