= Kastytis Žuromskas =

Lithuanian politician (born 1991)

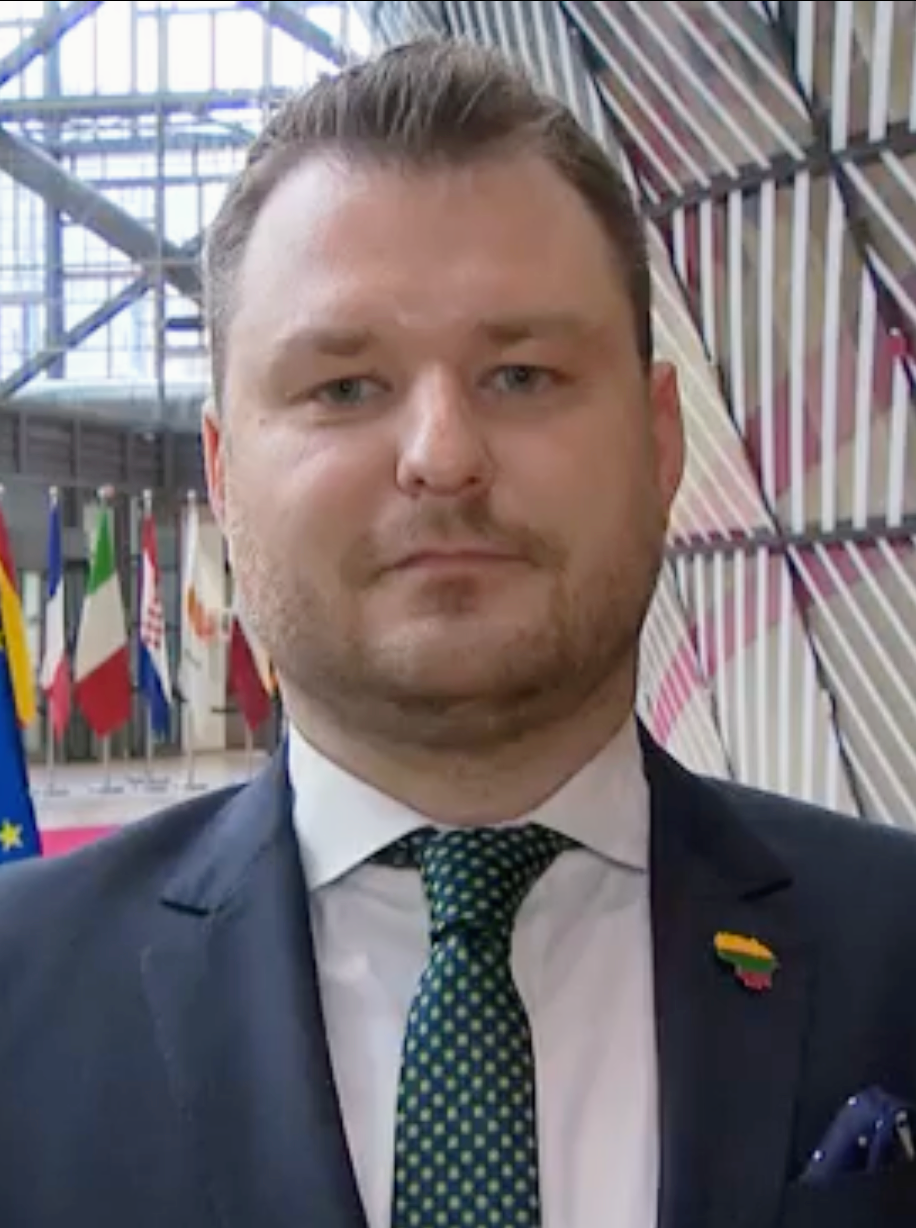
- K. Žuromskas, March 2026

Minister of Environment
- In office 25 September 2025 – 14 July 2026
- Prime Minister: Inga Ruginienė
- Preceded by: Povilas Poderskis
- Succeeded by: Ieva Andriulaitytė

Personal details
- Born: 10 May 1991 (age 35)
- Party: Dawn of Nemunas (since 2023)

Kastytis Žuromskas (born 10 May 1991) is a Lithuanian politician serving as minister of environment since September 2025. From January to September 2025, he served as deputy minister of environment.
