= Laima Griciūtė =

Lithuanian oncologist (b. 1926, d. 2018)

Liudvika Laima Griciūtė
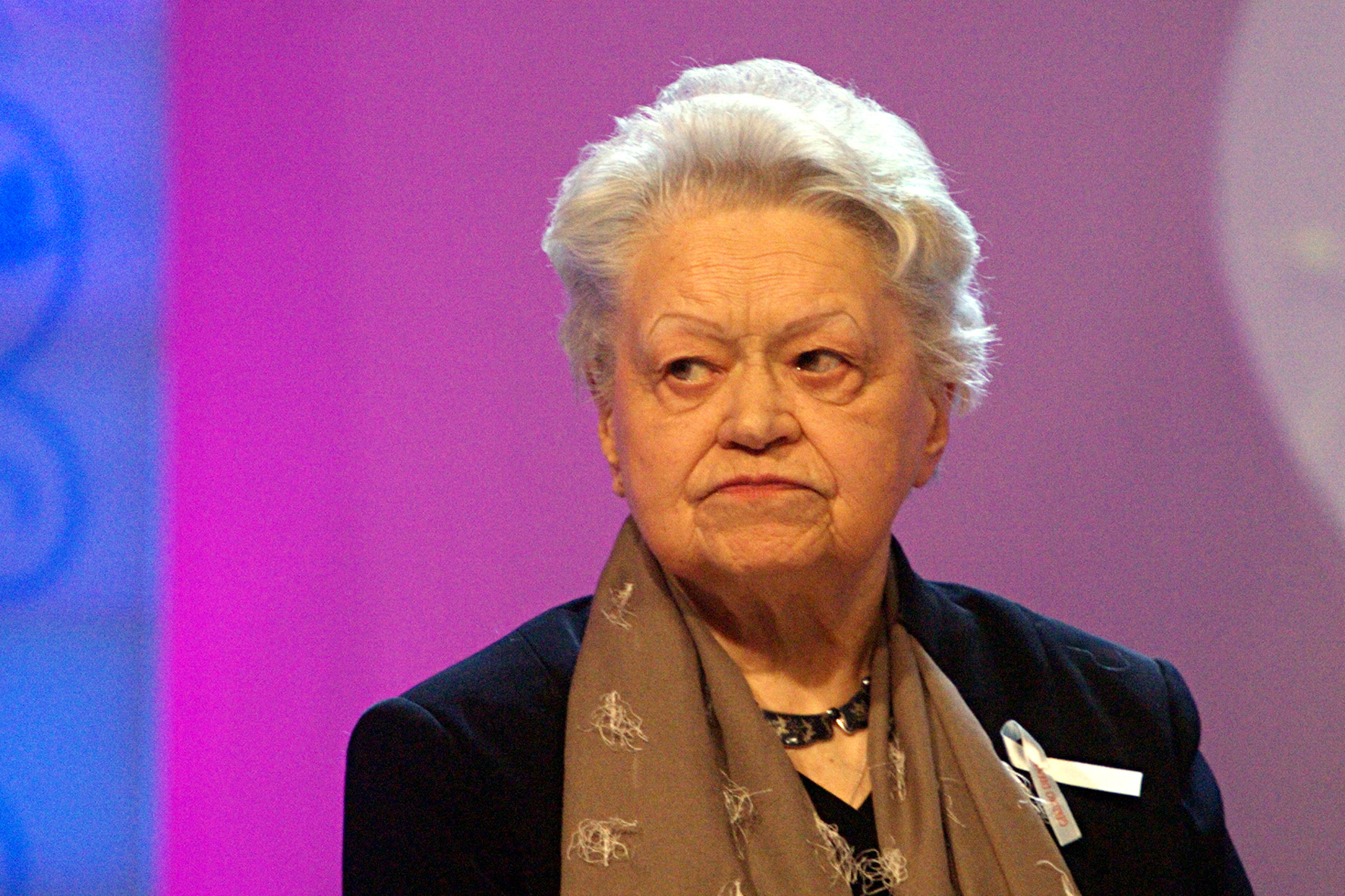
- Born: 15 April 1926; Kaunas, Lithuania
- Died: 3 November 2018 (aged 92)
- Citizenship: Lithuanian
- Awards: Lithuanian Science Prize; 2002
- Scientific career
- Fields: oncology
- Thesis: Experimental lung tumors (1966)

Liudvika Laima Griciūtė (15 April 1926 – 3 November 2018) was a Lithuanian oncologist and habilitated Doctor of Biomedical Sciences.

== Biography ==
In 1941 Griciūtė and her parents were forcefully displaced to Altai Krai, Sakha Republic, Yaroslavl Oblast, Russia. Following her return to Lithuania in 1946 she studied at the Kaunas University medical faculty. In 1950 she was a student at the Kaunas Medical Institute. From 1952 to 1955, she undertook a doctoral program at the Leningrad Institute of Oncology. In 1955 she defended her candidate thesis in medical sciences and in 1966 her medical sciences doctoral thesis on „Eksperimentiniai plaučių navikai“ (Experimental lung tumors). In 1989 she was awarded with a professor title.

In 1955 Griciūtė worked as an ordinary at the Republican Oncology Dispensary. In 1956 she was a junior research fellow at the Leningrad Institute of Oncology. From 1957 to 1974, Griciūtė was in charge of the Institute's pathological morphology laboratory. In 1967, she did a one-year internship at the Institut du Radium laboratory of genetics. In 1974 Griciūtė participated in an international expedition on the research of environmental carcinogens in Iran. From 1974 to 1980, she was the head of the Environmental Carcinogens Division of the International Agency for Research on Cancer, Lyon. In 1988, she became a member of the Agency's Scientific Council.

After her return to Lithuania in 1980 Griciūtė worked as a deputy director at the Epidemiology, Microbiology and Hygiene Institute in Vilnius. From 1982 to 1990, she had several different positions, including being the director of the Oncology Research Institute, the Chief Oncologist at the Ministry of Health, the chairman of the Oncology Scientific Society, and a member of the Cancer Registry Council of the Lithuanian SSR. From 1990 to 1993, Griciūtė was in charge of the Oncology Center's Environmental Carcinogens Laboratory. From 1993 to 1999, she was the Oncology Center's deputy director for science. In 2002 Griciūtė was awarded with a Lithuanian Science Prize.

== Bibliography ==
- Experimental lung tumors, 1975 (Russian)
- Pathological anatomy (with others), textbook, 1986
- Primary cancer prevention (with others), 1992
- Carcinogenesis and biology of cancer, 1992
- Oncology (with others), 1992
- Alcohol and cancer, 1994 (Russian)
