= Ministry of the Interior (Lithuania) =

Government ministry of Lithuania

- Vidaus reikalų ministerija (in Lithuanian)

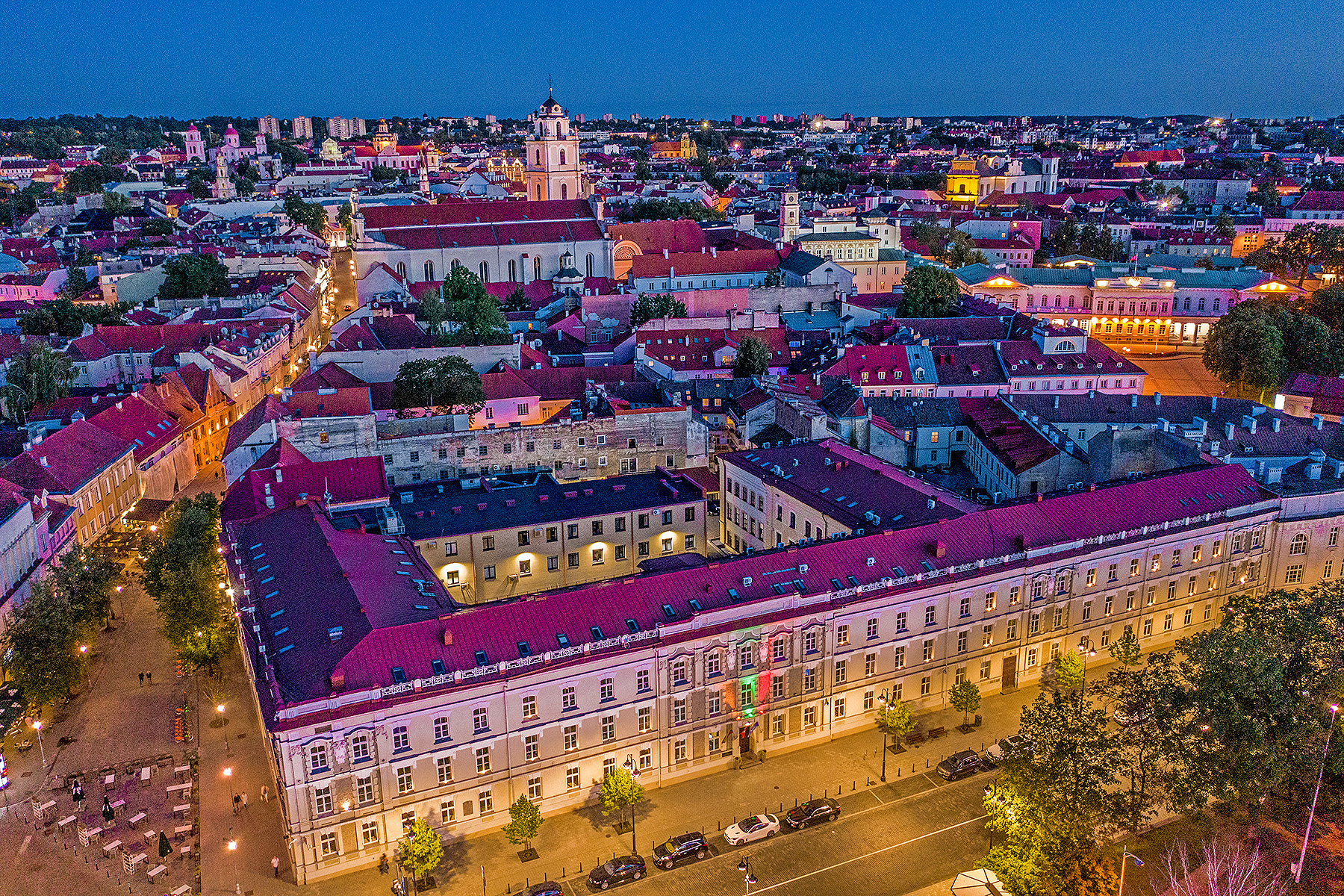
- Building of the Ministry of the Interior on Šventaragio Street in Vilnius

Ministry overview
- Formed: 11 November 1918; 107 years ago
- Jurisdiction: Government of Lithuania
- Headquarters: Šventaragio 2, Senamiestis, 01510 Vilnius
- Employees: 189 permanent employees (January 2021)
- Annual budget: ▲€839 million (2025)
- Minister responsible: Vladislav Kondratovič, 26th Minister for the Interior of Lithuania
- Website: vrm.lt

Map
- 54°41′4.9″N 25°17′20.8″E

The Ministry of the Interior of the Republic of Lithuania (Lithuanian: Lietuvos Respublikos vidaus reikalų ministerija) is charged with the oversight of public safety, border protection, migration control, emergency response, public administration and governance, the civil service, and local and regional development initiatives. Its operations are authorized by the Constitution of the Republic of Lithuania, decrees issued by the President and Prime Minister, and laws passed by the Seimas (Parliament).

== History ==
The Ministry of the Interior was first was established on 11 November 1918. Its first minister was Vladas Stašinskas. During the interwar period, many of the functions of the present day Ministry of Social Security and Labour as well as Ministry of Health were under the Ministry of the Interior. The Ministry of the Interior in its current form was restored on 17 March 1990.

== Structure ==
- Migration Department
- General Help Center
- Department of Civil Protection
- Financial Crime Investigation Service
- Population Register Service
- Department of Informatics and Communications
- Police Force
- Fire Protection and Rescue Department
- Regional Development Department
- Investigation Department
- Fire Rescue School
- Management Security Department
- State Border Guard Service
- Civil Service Department
- Public Security Service

== Institutions under the ministry ==
=== Lyceum ===
The General Povilas Plechavicius Cadet Lyceum (Lithuanian: Generolo Povilo Plechavičiaus kadetų licėjus) is a specialized state school based in Kaunas responsible for the training of young students. It serves under the Ministry of the Interior and Kaunas City Municipality. The school started its activities as a Young Warrior club in 1994, becoming the “Lūšiukai” school in 2005. In September 2012, the school was reformed from a non-formal educational institution. In 2013, the school was named General Povilas Plechavičius Cadet School and in 2015 it was named General Povilas Plechavičius Cadet Lyceum. Students from all cities and districts in Lithuania study at the lyceum. Pupils studying in lyceum generally go into higher education (General Jonas Žemaitis Military Academy of Lithuania and Mykolas Riomeris University), as well as professional military service. In March 2018, the director of the lyceum was dismissed from office for a period of 3 months due to suspicions of abuse of office. In January 2021, Lithuanian military cadets were given a virtual tour of the American 2nd Battalion, 8th Cavalry Regiment.

=== Wind Orchestra ===
Representative Wind Orchestra of the Ministry of the Interior (Lithuanian: Vidaus Reikalų Ministerijos Reprezentacinis pučiamųjų orkestras) is the only police band in Lithuania. It was first founded in 1935 as the wind orchestra of the Kaunas Police Department, led by Julius Radžiūnas as the first conductor. When Lithuania regained its independence, it was restored and resumed its activities under the direction of Algirdas Kazimieras Radzevičius. In 2008, the band was granted the status of a concert institution.

== Ministers ==
Democratic Labour Party Electoral Action of Poles in Lithuania Homeland Union Labour Party Liberal and Centre Union New Union Order and Justice Party Social Democratic Party Independent

Ministry of the Interior
| Term | Minister | Party | Cabinet | Office | | |
| Term | Minister | Party | Cabinet | Start date | End date | Time in office |
|---|---|---|---|---|---|---|
| 1 | Marijonas Misiukonis (born 1939) | Independent | Prunskienė | 17 January 1990 | 10 January 1991 | 358 days |
| 2 | Marijonas Misiukonis (born 1939) | Independent | Šimėnas | 10 January 1991 | 13 January 1991 | 3 days |
| 3 | Petras Valiukas (1948-1993) | Independent | Vagnorius | 13 January 1991 | 21 July 1992 | 1 year, 190 days |
| 4 | Petras Valiukas (1948-1993) | Independent | Abišala | 21 July 1992 | 17 December 1992 | 149 days |
| 5 | Romasis Vaitiekūnas (born 1943) | Independent | Lubys | 17 December 1992 | 31 March 1993 | 104 days |
| 6 | Romasis Vaitiekūnas (born 1943) | Independent | Šleževičius | 31 March 1993 | 19 March 1996 | 2 years, 354 days |
| 7 | Virgilijus Vladislovas Bulovas (1939-2024) | Democratic Labour Party | Stankevičius | 19 March 1996 | 10 December 1996 | 266 days |
| 8 | Vidmantas Žiemelis (born 1950) | Homeland Union | Vagnorius | 10 December 1996 | 21 May 1998 | 1 year, 162 days |
| 9 | Stasys Šedbaras (born 1958) | Homeland Union | Vagnorius | 22 May 1998 | 10 June 1999 | 1 year, 19 days |
| 10 | Česlovas Blažys (born 1943) | Independent | Paksas | 10 June 1999 | 11 November 1999 | 154 days |
| 11 | Česlovas Blažys (born 1943) | Independent | Kubilius | 11 November 1999 | 9 November 2000 | 364 days |
| 12 | Vytautas Markevičius (born 1962) | New Union | Paksas | 9 November 2000 | 12 July 2001 | 245 days |
| 13 | Juozas Bernatonis (born 1953) | Social Democratic Party | Brazauskas | 12 July 2001 | 28 April 2003 | 1 year, 290 days |
| 14 | Virgilijus Vladislovas Bulovas (1939-2024) | Social Democratic Party | Brazauskas | 13 May 2003 | 14 December 2004 | 1 year, 215 days |
| 15 | Gintaras Furmanavičius (born 1961) | Labour Party | Brazauskas | 14 December 2004 | 18 July 2006 | 1 year, 216 days |
| 16 | Raimondas Šukys (born 1966) | Liberal and Centre Union | Kirkilas | 18 July 2006 | 9 December 2007 | 1 year, 144 days |
| 17 | Regimantas Čiupaila (born 1956) | Liberal and Centre Union | Kirkilas | 17 December 2007 | 9 December 2008 | 358 days |
| 18 | Raimundas Palaitis (born 1957) | Liberal and Centre Union | Kubilius | 9 December 2008 | 26 March 2012 | 3 years, 108 days |
| 19 | Artūras Melianas (born 1964) | Liberal and Centre Union | Kubilius | 16 April 2012 | 13 December 2012 | 241 days |
| 20 | Dailis Alfonsas Barakauskas (born 1952) | Order and Justice Party | Butkevičius | 13 December 2012 | 30 October 2014 | 1 year, 321 days |
| 21 | Saulius Skvernelis (born 1970) | Independent | Butkevičius | 11 November 2014 | 13 April 2016 | 1 year, 154 days |
| 22 | Tomas Žilinskas (born 1977) | Independent | Butkevičius | 13 April 2016 | 13 December 2016 | 244 days |
| 23 | Eimutis Misiūnas (born 1973) | Independent | Skvernelis | 13 December 2016 | 7 August 2019 | 2 years, 237 days |
| 24 | Rita Tamašunienė (born 1973) | Electoral Action of Poles in Lithuania | Skvernelis | 7 August 2019 | 11 December 2020 | 1 year, 126 days |
| 25 | Agnė Bilotaitė (born 1982) | Homeland Union | Šimonytė | 11 December 2020 | 4 December 2024 | 5 years, 241 days |
| 26 | Vladislav Kondratovič (born 1972) | Social Democratic Party of Lithuania | Paluckas | 4 December 2024 | Incumbent | 1 year, 248 days |
