= Simonas Gentvilas =

Lithuanian politician

18th Minister of Environment
- In office 11 December 2020 – 12 December 2024
- Prime Minister: Ingrida Šimonytė
- Preceded by: Kęstutis Mažeika
- Succeeded by: Povilas Poderskis

Member of the Seimas
- Incumbent
- Assumed office 13 November 2020
- Preceded by: Gintaras Vaičekauskas
- Constituency: Pajūris
- In office 14 November 2016 – 13 November 2020
- Constituency: Multi-member

Personal details
- Born: 28 September 1984 (age 41) Klaipėda, Lithuania
- Party: Liberal Movement
- Spouse: Šarūnė Gentvilienė
- Children: 2
- Education: University of Oslo; University of Vienna

Simonas Gentvilas (born 28 September 1984) is a Lithuanian politician, a Member of the Seimas for Pajūris constituency and former Klaipėda City Councillor.

On 7 December 2020, he was approved to be the Minister of Environment in the Šimonytė Cabinet.

== Biography ==
He is son of politician Eugenijus Gentvilas.

From the age of sixteen he studied abroad. Graduated from a gymnasium in Karlskrona, Sweden.

Studied at universities in Sweden, Norway, Denmark, Belgium, Austria and Spain. He graduated from the University of Oslo in 2007 with a bachelor's degree in sociology. In 2010 graduated from the University of Vienna with a master's degree in Urban Development.

From 2015 to 2016 taught at Klaipeda College of Social Sciences.

== Political career ==
In 2011, he became an advisor to the Mayor of Klaipeda.

Since the autumn of 2015, he has been the Vice-chairman Liberal Movement.

From 2015 to 2016, he was Klaipėda City Councillor, the Head of the Liberal Movement group and the chairman of the City Development and Strategic Planning Committee in the Klaipėda City Council.

Since 2016, he has been a Member of the Seimas, and since 2020 he has been elected in the Pajūris constituency.

Seimas
Preceded by Gintaras Vaičekauskas	Member of the Seimas for Pajūris; 2020–present	Incumbent
