= Giedrius Surplys =

Lithuanian politician

Minister of Agriculture
- In office 15 May 2018 – 7 August 2019
- Prime Minister: Saulius Skvernelis
- Preceded by: Bronius Markauskas
- Succeeded by: Andrius Palionis

Personal details
- Born: 26 May 1980 (age 45)
- Party: Lithuanian Farmers and Greens Union

Giedrius Surplys (born 26 May 1980) is a Lithuanian politician. He served as Minister of Agriculture in the cabinet of Prime Minister Saulius Skvernelis from 15 May 2018 to 7 August 2019.

Political offices
| Preceded by Bronius Markauskas | Minister of Agriculture; 2018–2019 | Succeeded by Andrius Palionis |
