= Domas Griškevičius =

Lithuanian politician (born 1985)

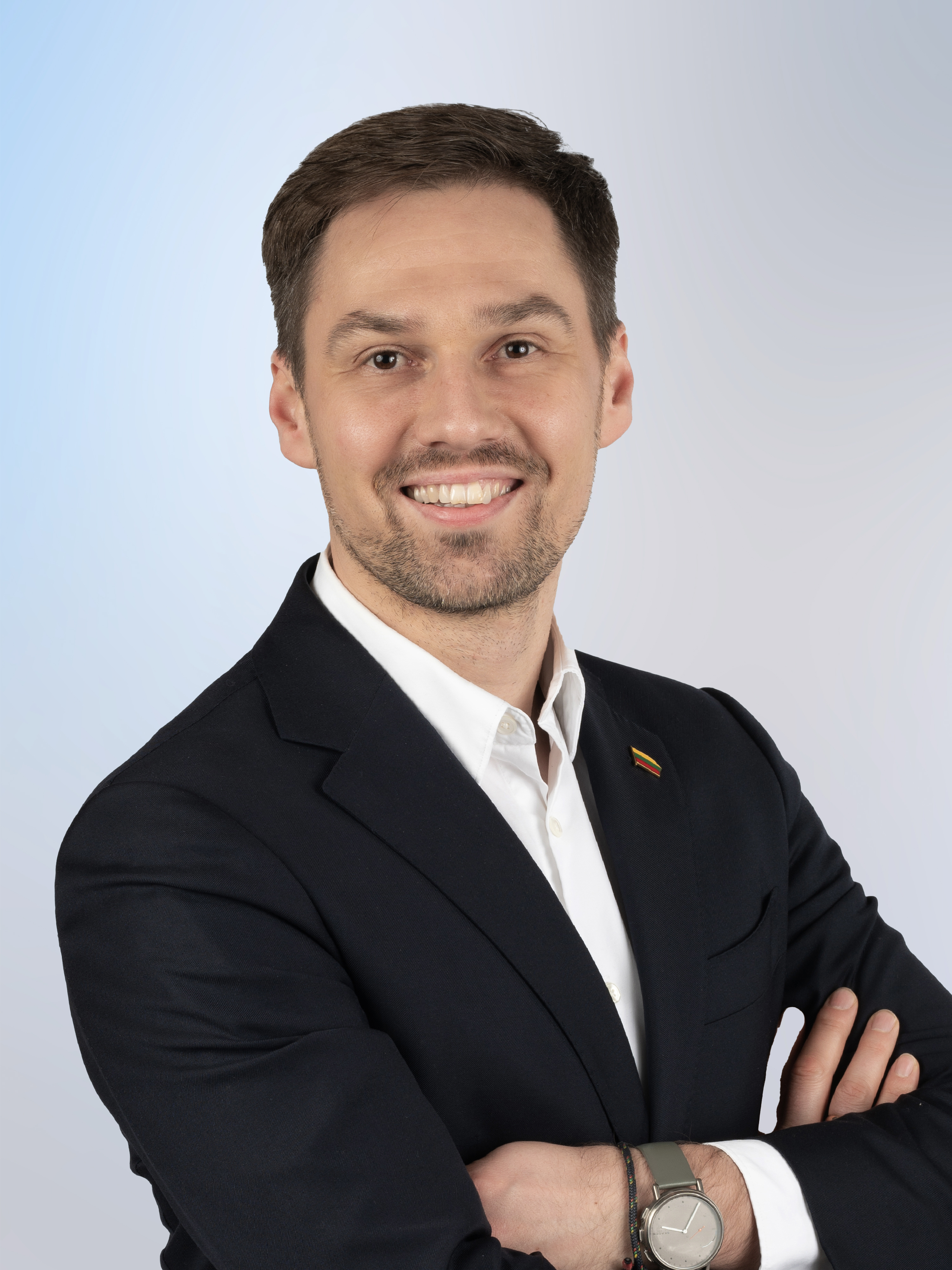
- Griškevičius in 2022

First Deputy Chairman of the Seimas
- Incumbent
- Assumed office 14 July 2026
- Speaker: Juozas Olekas
- Preceded by: Raimondas Šukys

Member of the Seimas
- Incumbent
- Assumed office 13 November 2020
- Constituency: Saulė

Personal details
- Born: 16 January 1985 (age 41)
- Party: Union of Democrats "For Lithuania"

Domas Griškevičius (born 16 January 1985) is a Lithuanian politician of the Union of Democrats "For Lithuania" serving as a member of the Seimas since 2020. From 2015 to 2020, he was a municipal councillor of Šiauliai.
