= Ignas Hofmanas =

Lithuanian politician (born 1984)

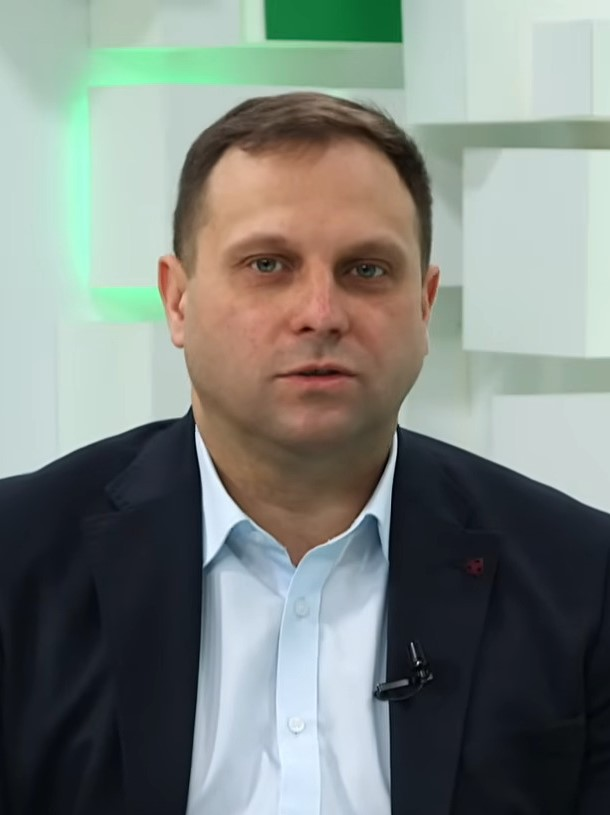

Minister of Agriculture
- In office 12 December 2024 – 25 September 2025
- Prime Minister: Gintautas Paluckas; Rimantas Šadžius (acting)
- Preceded by: Kazys Starkevičius
- Succeeded by: Andrius Palionis

Personal details
- Born: 4 February 1984 (age 42)

Ignas Hofmanas (born 4 February 1984) is a Lithuanian farmer and politician serving as minister of agriculture since 2024. He is the chairman of the Lithuanian Agricultural Council.
