= Raimondas Šukys =

Lithuanian lawyer and politician (born 1966)

Minister of Health of Lithuania
- In office 10 March 2010 – 13 December 2012
- Preceded by: Algis Čaplikas
- Succeeded by: Vytenis Andriukaitis

Minister of the Interior of Lithuania
- In office 12 July 2006 – 10 December 2007
- Preceded by: Gintaras Furmanavičius
- Succeeded by: Regimantas Čiupaila

Member of the Seimas
- Incumbent
- Assumed office 14 November 2024
- Constituency: Multi-member
- In office 10 October 2000 – 15 November 2012
- Preceded by: Audronius Ažubalis
- Succeeded by: Dainius Kreivys
- Constituency: Fabijoniškės

Deputy Speaker of the Seimas
- In office 27 March 2025 – 11 September 2025
- Succeeded by: Aušrinė Norkienė

First Deputy Speaker of the Seimas
- In office 11 September 2025 – 14 July 2026
- Preceded by: Juozas Olekas
- Succeeded by: Domas Griškevičius

Personal details
- Born: 27 October 1966 (age 59) Šiauliai, Lithuanian SSR, USSR
- Party: PPNA
- Occupation: Politician

Raimondas Šukys (born 27 October 1966 in Šiauliai) is a Lithuanian lawyer and politician. He served as Interior Minister from 2006 to 2007, and Minister of Health from 2010 to 2012.

== Early life ==
Šukys attended military service in the Red Army from 1985 to 1987.

In 1992, Šukys graduated from the Law Faculty of Vilnius University, and in 1996 he completed his doctoral studies there.

== Career ==
He worked as a lawyer in the editorial department of the daily Šiaulių kraštas from 1991 to 1992 and for consulting company Verslo Raktas from 1992 to 1993. From 1992 to 2004, he worked as an assistant in the Department of Civil Law Faculty of Law at Vilnius University.

He worked as an assistant in the parliamentary group of the Democratic Labour Party of Lithuania, and, from 1994 to 1997, served as an adviser to the Parliamentary Committee of Inquiry. From 1998 to 1999, he served as a legal consultant in the company BNA Grupė, becoming an adviser in 2000. He worked in Civil law at the Department of Law and Legislation Government Offices.

In 2000 he was elected to Parliament as a candidate of the Liberal Union of Lithuania. From 2000 to 2001, he chaired the Parliamentary Committee on Law and Legislation, and from 2001 to 2004 served as its vice-chairman. In 2004, he ran for a seat as a deputy candidate of the Liberal and Centre Union. From 2004 to 2006, he was deputy chairman of the Committee on Law and Legislation.

In 2002 and 2003, he was a councilor in Vilnius. In 1997 and 2004, he worked in the campaign teams for Valdas Adamkus in the presidential election.

On 12 July 2006, Šukys was appointed Interior Minister in the government of Gediminas Kirkilas. On November 12, 2007, he resigned due to injuries from a car crash caused by a police officer. 4 days later, President Valdas Adamkus accepted his resignation. Šukys served as minister until 10 December 2007.

In the parliamentary elections of 2008, he was again a candidate for deputy from the Liberal and Centre Union party. On 18 November 2008, he was appointed vice-chairman of the Seimas. On 10 March 2010, he was appointed health minister in the government of Andrius Kubilius.

In 2012 he was not elected to Parliament; his party did not exceed the election threshold. In December of that same year, he ended his tenure in Senior government.
