= National Health Insurance Fund =

Lithuanian health insurance

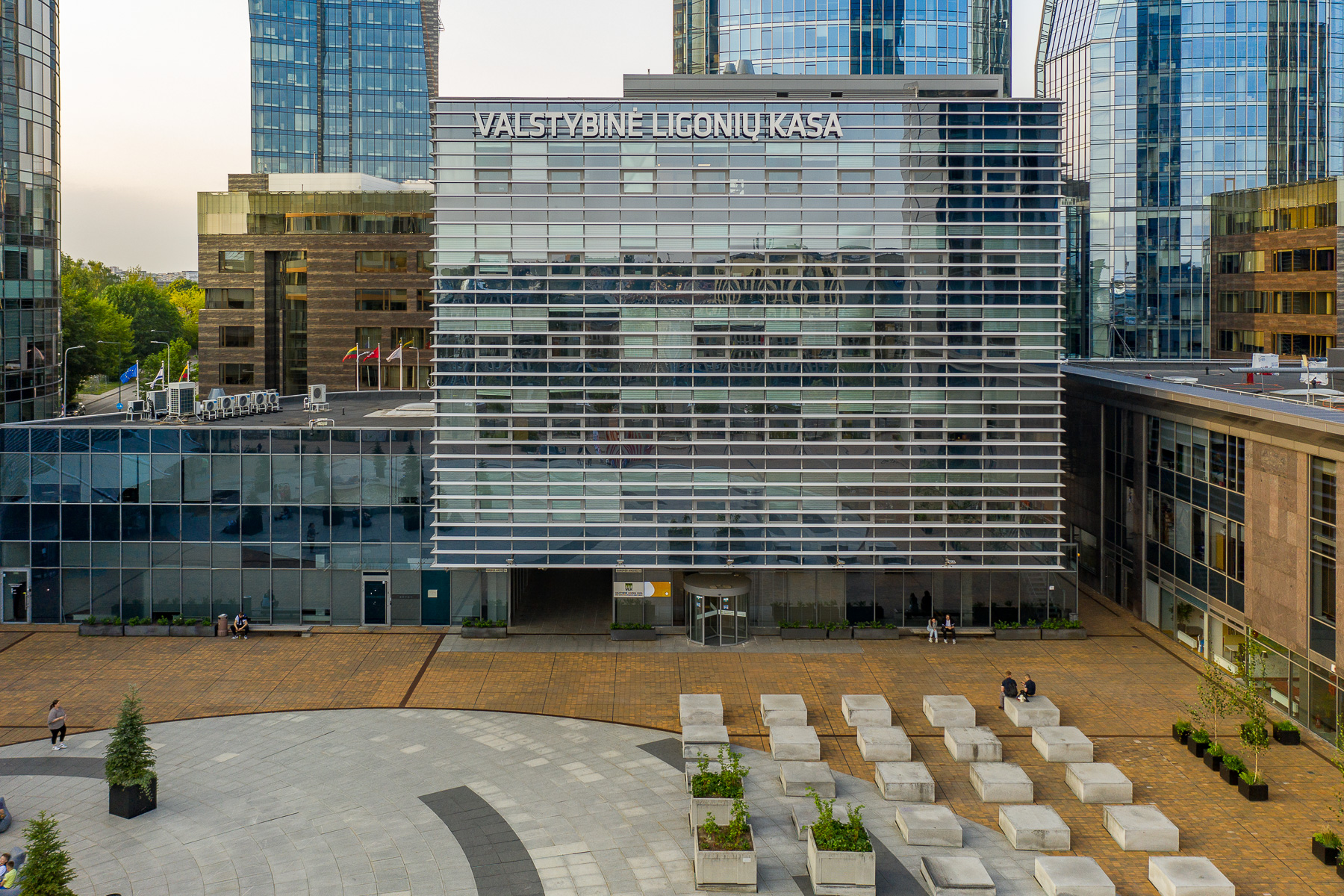
Headquarters in Vilnius Central Business District

The National Health Insurance Fund or VLK (Lithuanian: Valstybinė ligonių kasa) is a key part of the healthcare system in Lithuania. It was established in 1993.

The fund finances primary care largely by capitation payments, with some fees for service and performance-related pay. Ambulatory care is mostly paid on a case basis with additional fees for diagnostic tests. Patients can choose a hospital or a specialist. There are four rates of coverage for prescribed medication: 100% for life-saving drugs such as oncology products and 80% for chronic diseases. 90% and 50% are rarely used. There are risk-sharing agreements with pharmaceutical companies. 45% of all prescriptions are electronic, and it is hoped to increase this. The insurance scheme does not cover adult dentistry or, for most people, outpatient prescription medicines. Only about 1% take out additional voluntary health insurance.

Contributions are compulsory for all residents. The government pays for about 55% of the population – children under 18, old-age pensioners, disabled and unemployed people. In 2016, 225,510 people, about 8% of the population, had not paid their contributions to the National Health Insurance Fund, but it was thought that many were actually not in the country. In 2009, penalties for non-payment and a waiting period of three months before a new contributor is entitled to benefits were introduced.

Jūratė Sabalienė was appointed director of the fund in September 2017.

In October 2018, the Financial Crime Investigation Service announced that it had detected a fraud against the fund where more than 1,200 Polish people were given fake employment contracts in Lithuania to get refunds of healthcare costs to which they were not entitled. They did not in fact work in Lithuania, but claimed to be eligible for sickness and maternity benefits under European Union law. 120,000 euros for 420 bogus employees were transferred from the fund to the Narodowy Fundusz Zdrowia before the fraud was detected.
