= Mykolas Majauskas =

Lithuanian politician (born 1981)

Mykolas Majauskas MP
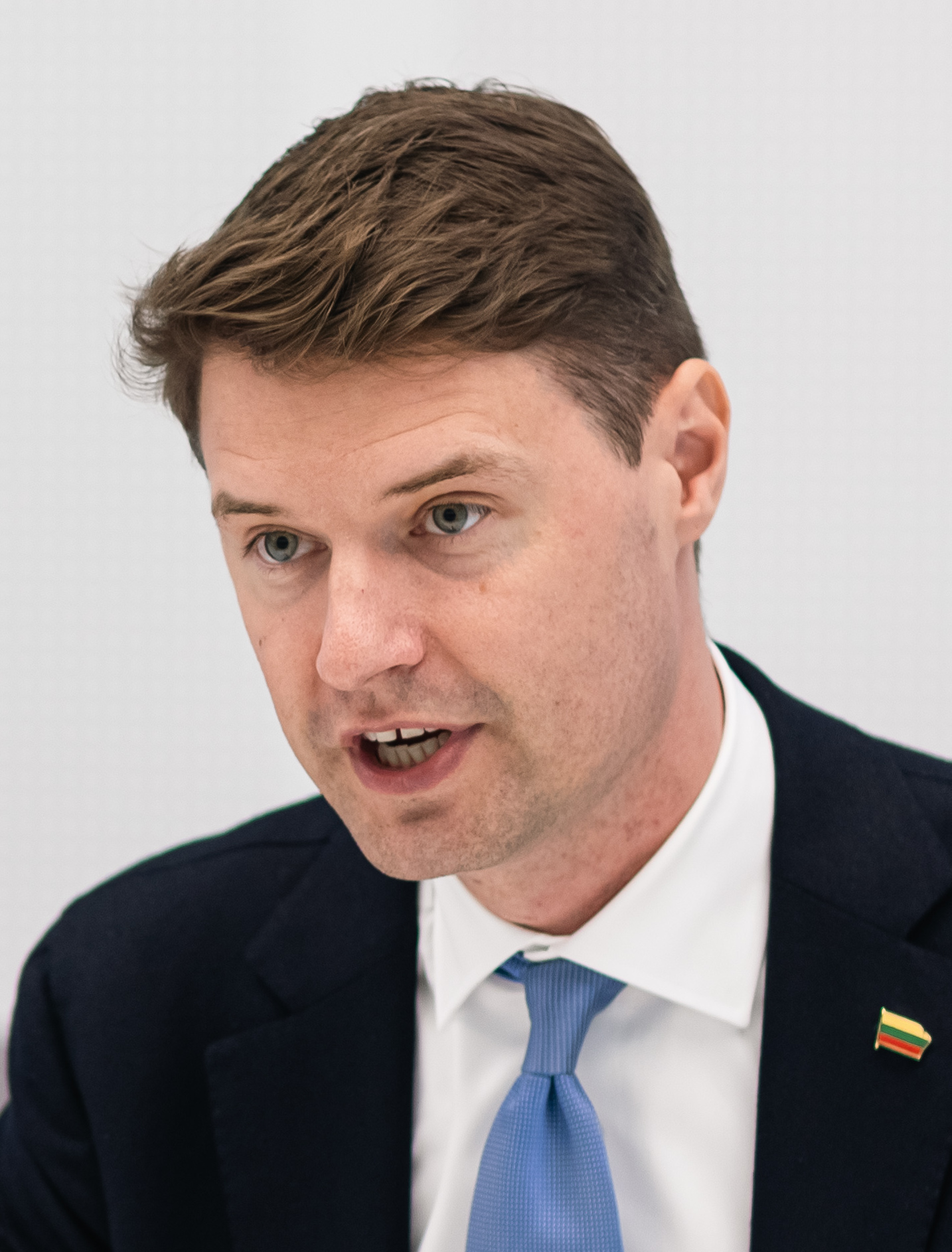

Member of the Seimas
- In office 13 November 2020 – 6 April 2023
- Succeeded by: Kęstutis Navickas
- Constituency: Multi-member
- In office 14 November 2016 – 12 November 2020
- Preceded by: Arvydas Anušauskas
- Succeeded by: Viktorija Čmilytė-Nielsen
- Constituency: Senamiestis-Žvėrynas

Personal details
- Born: 19 December 1981 (age 44) Vilnius, Lithuanian SSR, Soviet Union
- Party: Independent (2022-present); Homeland Union (2013-2022)
- Spouse: Ieva Domarkaitė (m.2008; d.2018)
- Children: 3
- Education: University of Sydney

Mykolas Majauskas (born 19 December 1981) is a Lithuanian public person, a former Chair of Finance Committee and member of the Seimas, a former Vilnius city councillor and former Lithuania Government Official. He has resigned from the Parliament Finance committee after refusing to vote for tax increases and therefore was expelled from Homeland Union in November 2022. Mykolas has been approved by the Central Bank of Lithuania as a board member of one of the leading real estate fund management companies and elected as President of Crypto Economy Organisation.

== Biography ==
Mykolas Majauskas was born 19 December 1981 in Vilnius and raised there. After the first course of study in Lithuania, he moved to Australia, where he graduated from the University of Sydney in 2004 with a bachelor's degree in economics and finance. He later moved to London, where he worked for Barclays Bank advising governments of Central and Eastern Europe on how to manage their debts during the crisis.

In 2008, Majauskas became the Chief economic adviser to Prime Minister Andrius Kubilius, the leader of the Homeland Union Christian Democrat party at the time.

In 2013, Majauskas became a member of the conservative Homeland Union Christian Democrat party, a member of the European People’s Party. Mykolas was named a shadow minister of finance as part of a shadow cabinet headed by former Prime Minister Andrius Kubilius.

In 2015, Majauskas was selected by the Homeland Union Christian Democrat party to run for Vilnius mayor office. After losing the election, he became a council member of the Vilnius municipality and leader of the conservative faction in the council.

In November 2016 Majauskas became a Member of the Seimas for Senamiestis constituency.

In 2020 Lithuanian parliamentary election Viktorija Čmilytė-Nielsen defeated Majauskas in the Senamiestis constituency and he was elected to Seimas in multi-member constituency through Homeland Union list. In November 2020 he became the Chairman of the Committee of the Budget and Finance of Seimas. In 2022 Mykolas has resigned from Seimas Budget and Finance Committee having refused to vote for tax increases to catering sector and was expelled from the Homeland Union in December 2022 because of this, despite the fact Mykolas has won the confidence procedure as a Chairman of Budget and Finance Committee at the Parliament by a landslide majority with only 9 MPs voting against him. Subsequently, in March 2023, he ran for mayor of Vilnius as an independent candidate and came third. During the election campaign in December 2022, political opponents alleged—without evidence—he was paid "the cash equivalent of a two-bedroom apartment" to support pro-gambling legislation. MP Matas Maldeikis, from a rival party, claimed to have heard this from a middleman involved in an earlier bribery attempt. However, law enforcement and public institutions dismissed the claims, taking no action against him.

On 30 March 2023 Majauskas announced that he will relinquish his mandate at the Seimas and resigned later in April that year.

Mykolas has been approved by the Central Bank of Lithuania as a board member of one of the leading real estate fund management companies "Capitalica Asset Management".

In 2024 The Crypto Economy Organization, which unites the largest blockchain and financial technology market participants, elected Mykolas Majauskas as a new member and President of the board at the general meeting.

== Professional career ==
Majauskas began his professional career in Sydney, Australia as a research manager at commercial property company Laing & Simmons. Mykolas continued to work for the group moving to C&W London offices, where he took a position as a consultant in the Corporate Real Estate Strategy team. Later Majauskas moved to work for Barclays Bank global investment bank arm Barclays Capital. In 2008, Majauskas moved to Lithuania to work as Chief economic adviser to Prime Minister Andrius Kubilius.

Following a four-year term working for the government, Majauskas returned to the private sector. He became the Chairman of the Board of the biggest online retailer in the Baltics and attracted investment from leading Polish venture capital firm MCI.

In 2013, Mykolas was the founding curator of Global Shapers Vilnius Hub – a part of the World Economic Forum initiative that connects young and driven people in their 20s and 30s who aspire to shape the future of the world by improving Vilnius City and Lithuania.

Mykolas has been approved by the Central Bank of Lithuania as a board member of one of the leading real estate fund management companies "Capitalica Asset Management".

In 2024 The Crypto Economy Organization, which unites the largest blockchain and financial technology market participants, elected Mykolas Majauskas as a new member and President of the board at the general meeting.

== Sexual harassment allegations ==
In 2018 Majauskas was accused by anonymous person (who allegedly was 18 years old schoolgirl), whose identity was never revealed, of making sexual advances. The person accused Majauskas of being in the same way involved with other people. The allegations were openly discussed by the media. The Prosecutor's office refused to initiate any pre-trial investigation against Mykolas Majauskas because allegation was anonymous and no persons were identified to have suffered from any misconduct by Mykolas Majauskas.

Majauskas survived two impeachment attempts in the Lithuanian Parliament, and never admitted guilt. There were no formal allegations against Majauskas by any law enforcement. The only formal procedure initiated by prosecutors office was of slander and reputational damage made by anonymous person to Majauskas. He was also accused of intimidating the victims. The scandal was one of the first ones to galvanize Lithuania's Me Too movement.

== Personal life ==
Majauskas had 2 daughters with his first wife, who he later divorced. Shortly after the divorce he announced engagement to a woman 12 years his junior, a former personal assistant. They have a son together.

== Suicide prevention ==
While working as a Vilnius city councilor, Majauskas initiated the first suicide prevention memorandum signed by key public institutions and NGOs committing to common goals to reduce suicide numbers in Vilnius. He also introduced Canadian-developed LivingWorks suicide prevention program across local governments in Lithuania. SafeTalk and ASIST training courses funded by the Vilnius City Municipality in 2017 were teaching how to prevent suicide by recognizing signs, providing a skilled intervention, and developing a safety plan to keep someone alive. Every year, nearly two thousand professionals from different fields are trained across Lithuania.

Working together with a writer Elvyra Kučinskaitė, Majauskas published a Lithuanian best-selling book as a simple self-help tool to prevent suicide. Majauskas said of this book, 'The goal of the book is to become a therapeutic reading helping people find the first steps towards professional help. The book purposefully does not have a name – it represents the idea of an uncomfortable start to talk about this delicate issue. It invites readers to start the conversation, express feelings, and give it the name of their own.'

Seimas
Preceded by Arvydas Anušauskas)	Member of the Seimas for Senamiestis; 2016–2020	Succeeded by Viktorija Čmilytė-Nielsen (Senamiestis and Žvėrynas)
