= Marija Jakubauskienė =

Lithuanian politician

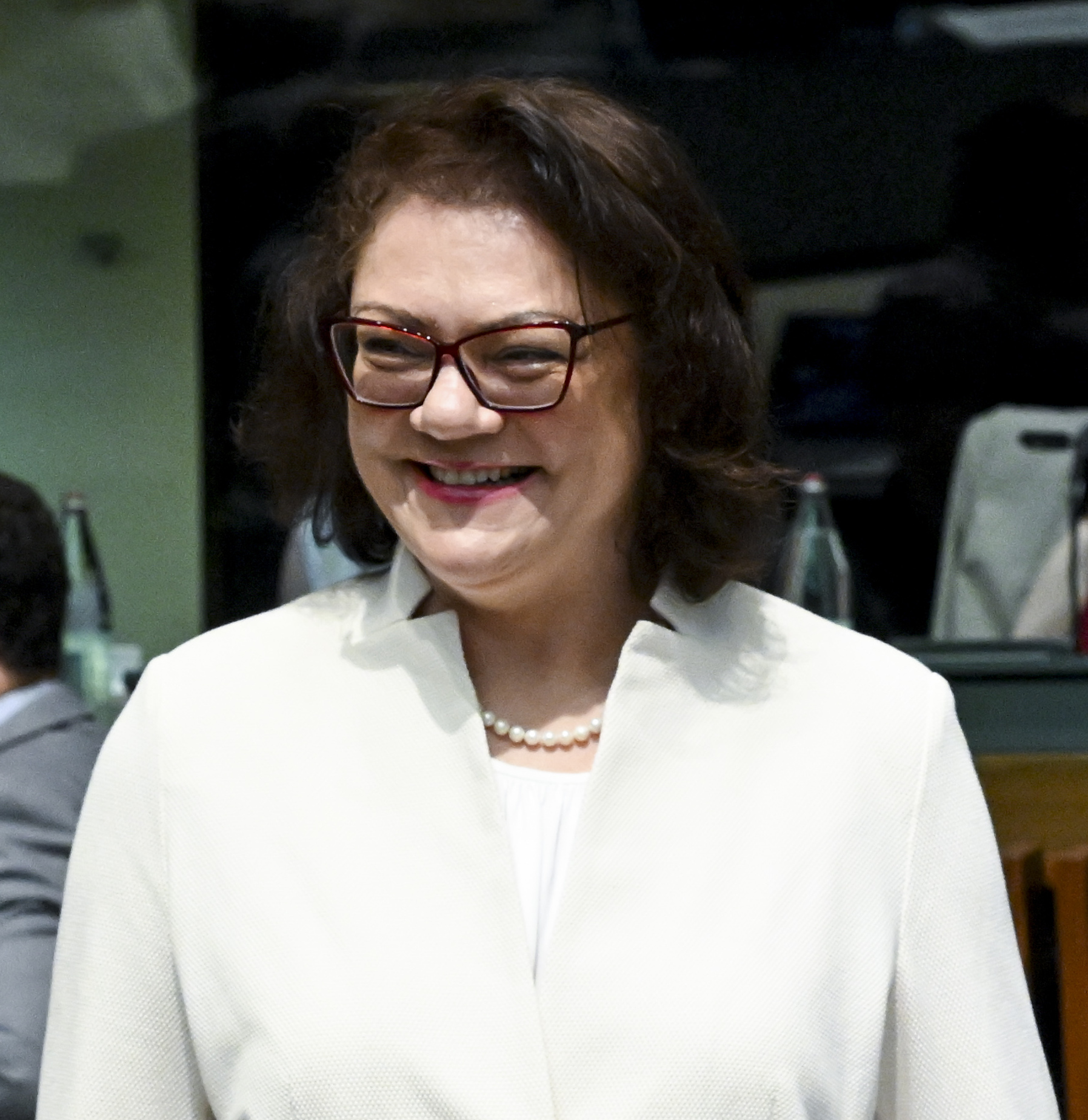
- Jakubauskienė in 2025

Minister of Health
- In office 12 December 2024 – 14 July 2026
- Prime Minister: Gintautas Paluckas; Rimantas Šadžius (acting); Inga Ruginienė
- Preceded by: Aurimas Pečkauskas
- Succeeded by: Linas Kukuraitis

Marija Jakubauskienė (born 2 May 1978) is a Lithuanian academic and politician who served as minister of health from 2024 until 2026. She is a professor of public health the Vilnius University Faculty of Medicine.

The Paluckas Government resigned on 4 August 2025; subsequently she served in an acting role under caretaker PM Rimantas Šadžius.
