= Linas Kukuraitis =

Lithuanian politician (born 1978)

Minister of Health
- Incumbent
- Assumed office 14 July 2026
- Prime Minister: Mindaugas Sinkevičius
- Preceded by: Marija Jakubauskienė

Minister of Social Security and Labour
- In office 13 December 2016 – 11 December 2020
- Prime Minister: Saulius Skvernelis
- Succeeded by: Monika Navickienė

Member of the Seimas
- Incumbent
- Assumed office 14 November 2024
- Constituency: Justiniškės-Viršuliškės
- In office 13 November 2020 – 14 November 2024
- Constituency: Multi-member

Personal details
- Born: 22 May 1978 (age 48)
- Party: Lithuanian Farmers and Greens Union (2016—2021); Union of Democrats "For Lithuania" (2021—present)

Linas Kukuraitis (born 22 May 1978) is a Lithuanian politician. He served as Minister of Social Security and Labour in the Skvernelis Cabinet led by Prime Minister Saulius Skvernelis from 13 December 2016 to 11 December 2020. He is currently serving as Minister of Health since 14 July 2026.

In 2021, Kukuraitis left his former party, the Lithuanian Farmers and Greens Union, and joined Union of Democrats "For Lithuania", a new party established by himself and Skvernelis.
