= Eimutis Misiūnas =

Lithuanian jurist and politician

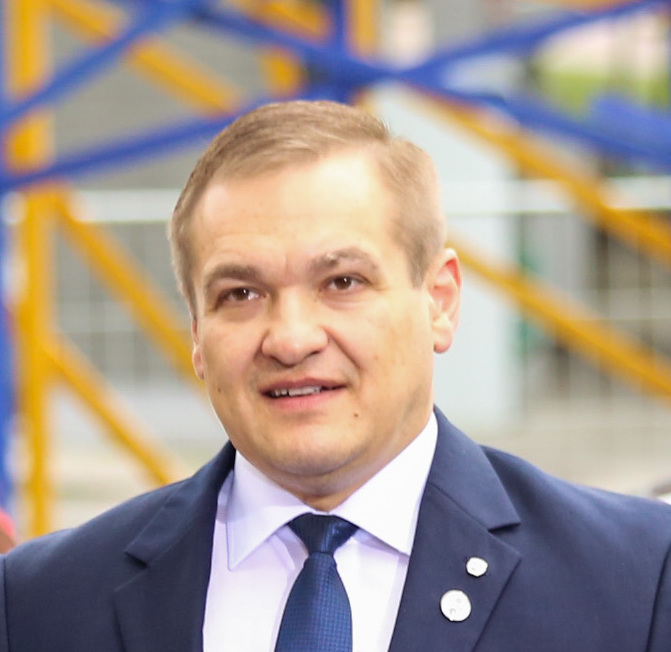
Eimutis Misiūnas

Eimutis Misiūnas (born 1973) is a Lithuanian jurist and politician, Minister of Interior of Lithuania from 2016 to 2019 (Skvernelis Cabinet). He was a teacher at Mykolas Romeris University and at the International School of Law and Business. He was a judge of Vilnius city court. Misiūnas is an expert in police law. He is a graduate of the Lithuanian Police Academy (now Mykolas Romeris University).
