= Milda Vainiutė =

Lithuanian legal scholar and politician (1962–2024)

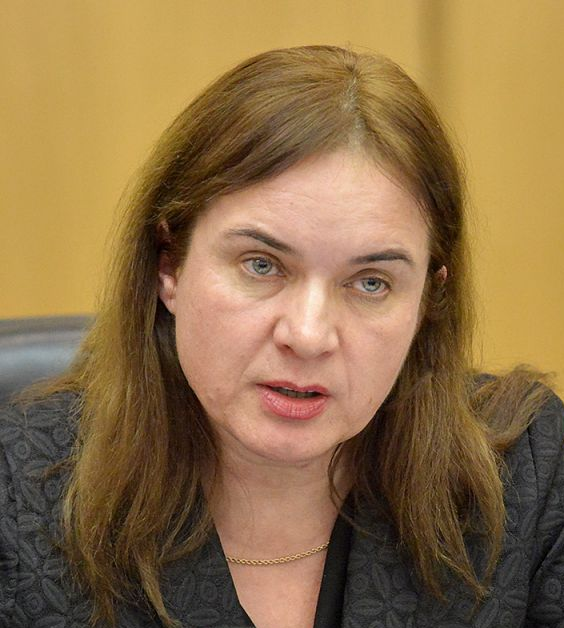
Vainiutė in 2017

Milda Vainiutė (20 December 1962 – 13 September 2024) was a Lithuanian legal scholar and politician.

== Life and career ==
Vainiutė was a professor at Mykolas Romeris University and legal adviser of Valdas Adamkus, President of Lithuania. Vainiutė was a specialist in constitutional law. She graduated in law from Vilnius University.

From December 2016 to March 2018 Milda Vainiutė was Minister of Justice of Lithuania in Skvernelis Cabinet.

Vainiutė died on 13 September 2024, at the age of 61.
