= Povilas Poderskis =

Lithuanian politician

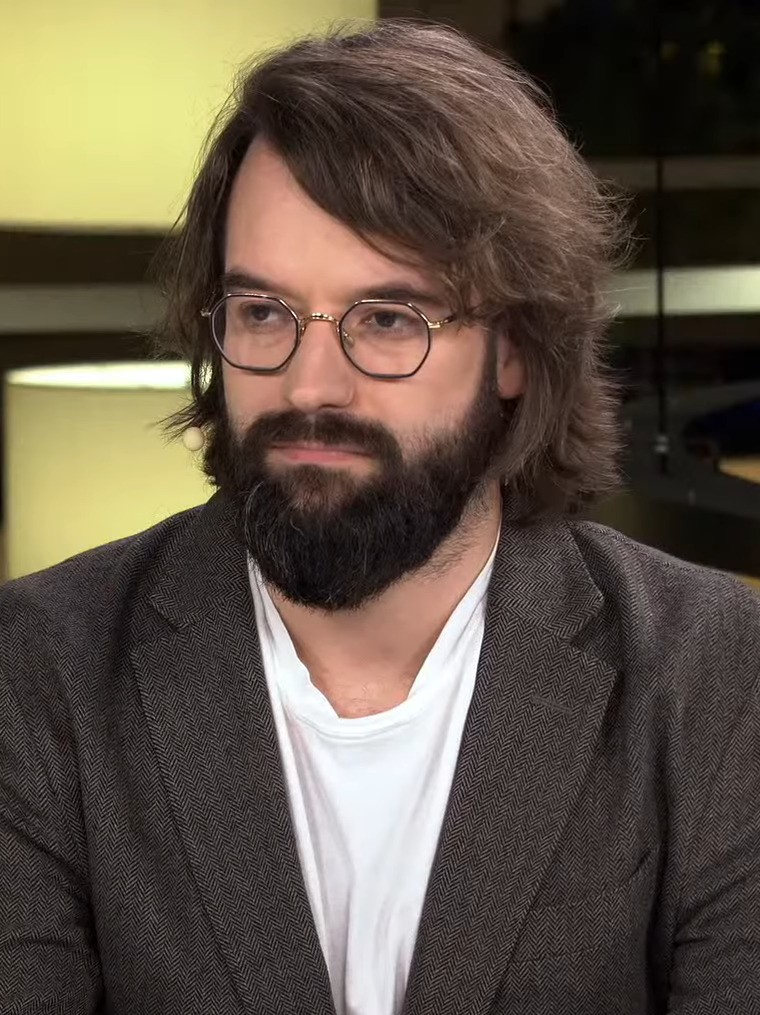

Minister of Environment
- In office 12 December 2024 – 25 September 2025
- Prime Minister: Gintautas Paluckas; Rimantas Šadžius (acting)
- Preceded by: Simonas Gentvilas
- Succeeded by: Kastytis Žuromskas

Personal details
- Party: Freedom Party (2019-2020)

Povilas Poderskis is a Lithuanian politician serving as minister of environment since 2024. From 2017 to 2021, he served as director of the Vilnius City Municipality Administration. Poderskis has also been one of the founding members of the progressive liberal Freedom Party. He left it in 2020, while remaining in the team of Vilnius Mayor Remigijus Šimašius.

From 12 December 2024 until 25 September 2025, Povilas Poderskis was delegated by Nemunas Dawn and served as Lithuania’s Minister of Environment. In July 2025, he announced that Lithuania’s green public procurement had surged from just 5% in 2020 to over 95% in 2025, highlighting the government's commitment to sustainable procurement practices.
