= Jonas Pranas Aleksa =

Lithuanian politician (1879–1955)

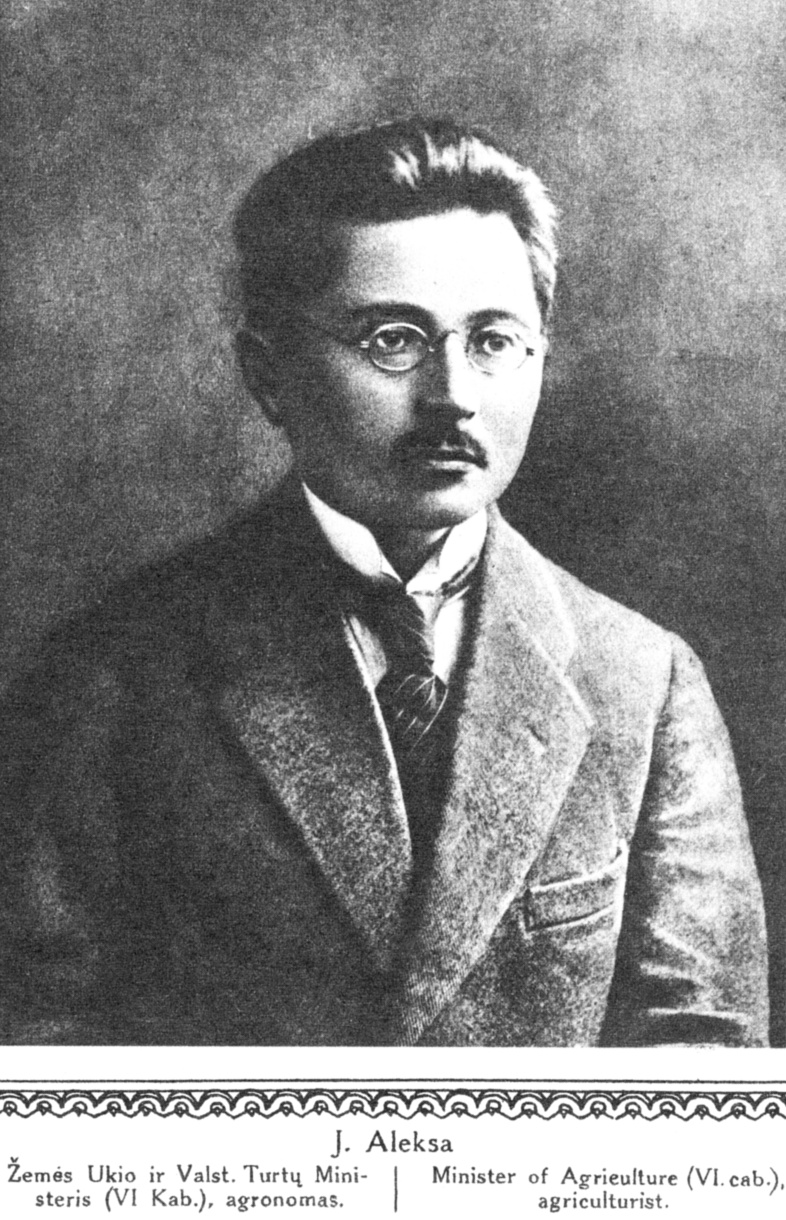

Minister of Agriculture
- In office 19 June 1920 – 22 February 1923
- Preceded by: Juozas Tūbelis
- Succeeded by: Mykolas Krupavičius
- In office 17 December 1926 – 6 November 1935
- Preceded by: Mykolas Krupavičius
- Succeeded by: Stasys Putvinskis

Personal details
- Born: 5 December 1879 Kumetiškiai, Congress Poland
- Died: April 22, 1955 (aged 75) Tomsk Oblast, Soviet Union
- Party: Independent
- Education: Imperial Moscow University

Jonas Pranas Aleksa (5 December 1879 – 22 April 1955) was a Lithuanian politician, agronomist, sociologist, and economist. He was the Minister of Agriculture in the cabinets of four Prime Ministers: Kazys Grinius, Ernestas Galvanauskas, Augustinas Voldemaras, and Juozas Tūbelis.

== Biography ==
Jonas Pranas Aleksa was born in Kumetiškės on 24 December 1879. Aleksa served as Minister of Agriculture under six cabinets during the years 1920–1923 and 1926–1934. Aleksa also twice served as Deputy Prime Minister. Aleksa initiated the founding of the Chamber of Agriculture in 1926. Beyond his work in government, Aleksa edited an agricultural journal, sat on the Board of the Cooperative Bank, and taught agricultural economics at the University of Lithuania and then at Vytauto Didžiojo University.

In 1942, Aleksa protested against the colonization of Lithuania and the killing of Lithuanian citizens, presenting a memorandum to the German Commissioner-General in Kaunas. From 1942 to 1944, Aleksa lived under gestapo supervision. In 1948, Aleksa was deported by the Soviets to Siberia, where he died on 22 April 1955. In 1990, his remains were repatriated to Lithuania where they were buried in Palanga.

In 2022, a plaque dedicated to Aleksa's memory and contributions to Lithuanian agriculture, science, and politics was unveiled by the Agricultural Minister Kęstutis Navickas in Kaunas, outside the house on Kęstutis Street that he lived in from 1927 to 1935.

== Personal life ==
Aleksa's relatives included other prominent public figures. Julius Aleksa (1855–1891) was a Lithuanian folk song collector, botanical dictionary creator, and newspaper writer. Konradas Juozas Aleksa (1881–1956) was one of the founders of the Lithuanian Veterinary Doctors' Union and was persecuted by the Soviet occupation. Konstantinas Aleksa (1863–1935) was a teacher who helped to establish Lithuanian schools in the Suwałki Region. The Aleksa family's historic home is located at: Šilvėnai, 71486 Šakiai District Municipality, Lithuania.
