= Skvernelis Cabinet =

- 2016–2020
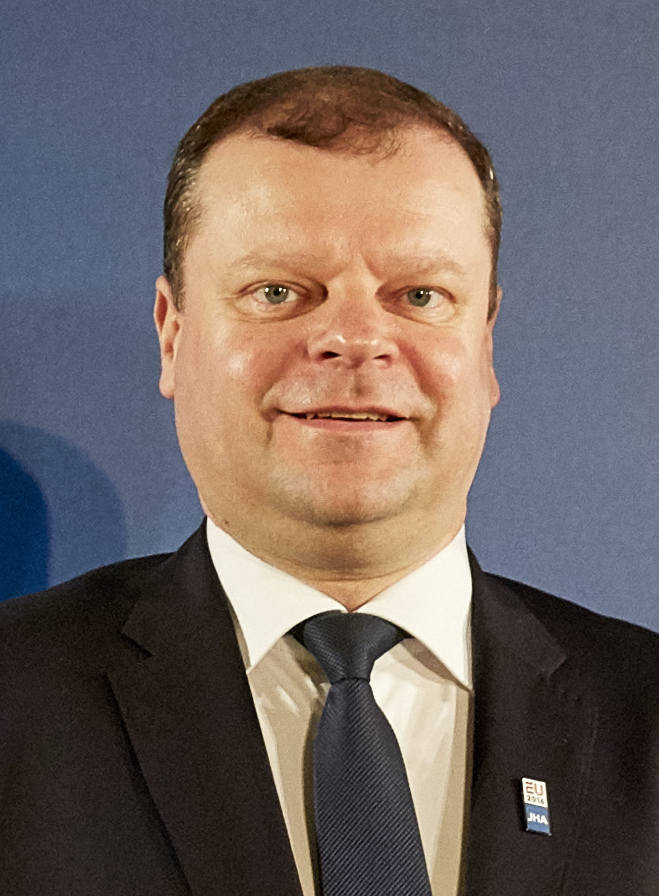
- Date formed: December 13, 2016
- Date dissolved: December 11, 2020

People and organisations
- Head of state: Dalia Grybauskaitė (2016–2019); Gitanas Nausėda (2019–2020)
- Head of government: Saulius Skvernelis
- Member parties: Lithuanian Farmers and Greens Union; Social Democratic Party of Lithuania (2016–2017); Social Democratic Labour parliamentary group (2017–2018); Social Democratic Labour Party of Lithuania (2018–2020); Order and Justice (2019); Electoral Action of Poles (2019–2020)
- Status in legislature: Majority coalition government (2016–2017; 2019); Minority coalition government (2017–2019; 2019–2020) supported by Order and Justice (2018–2019) supported by parliamentary group "For the Welfare of Lithuania" (2019–2020); Christian Union (2020)
- Opposition parties: Homeland Union – Lithuanian Christian Democrats; Liberal Movement; Order and Justice (2016–2018); Social Democratic Party of Lithuania (2017–2020)
- Opposition leader: Viktorija Čmilytė-Nielsen (2019), Julius Sabatauskas (2019–2020), Gabrielius Landsbergis (2020)

History
- Election: 2016
- Legislature term: Twelfth Seimas
- Predecessor: Butkevičius Cabinet
- Successor: Šimonytė Cabinet

The Skvernelis Cabinet was the 17th cabinet of Lithuania since 1990. At the end of its term, it consisted of Prime Minister Saulius Skvernelis, who served as the Head of Government, and 14 government ministers from the Lithuanian Farmers and Greens Union, Social Democratic Labour Party of Lithuania, and Electoral Action of Poles in Lithuania – Christian Families Alliance. In the beginning, the Social Democratic Party was a member of the coalition, while the Social Democratic Labour Party had not been formed yet and the Electoral Action of Poles was not a member of the coalition. The Order and Justice party joined the coalition in 2019 before dissolving itself.

== History ==
=== Farmers and Greens Union and Social Democratic Party coalition ===
After the parliamentary elections in 2016, President Dalia Grybauskaitė appointed Saulius Skvernelis, an independent politician who had led the electoral list of Peasants and Greens Union, as the Prime Minister on 22 November 2016. The cabinet received its mandate on 13 December 2016.

On April 22, 2017, the Social Democratic Party of Lithuania elected its new chairman, Gintautas Paluckas. After his election, Gintautas Paluckas stated that he would seek to change the coalition agreement that was made in the winter of 2016. By the summer of 2017 the disagreements between the Lithuanian Farmers and Greens Union and the Social Democratic Party of Lithuania on various issues (most notably on public forest enterprises) became more pronounced. In July 2017 the Social Democratic Party of Lithuania announced that it would conduct opinion polling in district branches on whether or not to remain in the coalition. Final results were released on September 23, 2017.

The majority of the Social Democratic Party of Lithuania district branches voted to withdraw from the coalition, but the majority of the party's members in the Seimas (10 out of 17 members) disagreed with this decision. Because of this, 12 out of 17 members of the parliamentary group formed a new political group and re-entered a coalition with the Lithuanian Farmers and Greens Union. The new coalition because a minority government as only 69 members of Parliament out of 141 were members of the coalition.

=== Farmers and Greens Union and Social Democratic Labour Party coalition ===
By the end of 2017, the 12 members who defected from the Social Democratic Party formed the new Social Democratic Labour parliamentary group. On March 24, 2018, this parliamentary group became the new Social Democratic Labour Party of Lithuania. On April 24, 2018, this party and the Lithuanian Farmers and Greens Union formed an official coalition.

By the summer of 2018 negotiations started between the Lithuanian Farmers and Greens Union, the Social Democratic Labour Party of Lithuania, and the Order and Justice party considering possible cooperation between them. On September 11, 2018, those parties signed a confidence and supply agreement. On May 29, 2019, the Social Democratic Labour Party of Lithuania and Order and Justice chairmen Gediminas Kirkilas and Remigijus Žemaitaitis announced to the public that talks about expanded coalition between these parties and Lithuanian Farmers and Greens Union had started. On June 7, 2019, Electoral Action of Poles in Lithuania – Christian Families Alliance council agreed that the party should also join these talks, which were concluded on July 5, 2019.

=== Farmers and Greens Union, Social Democratic Labour Party and Electoral Action of Poles in Lithuania – Christian Families Alliance coalition ===
The new coalition lasted just for two months as the Order and Justice parliamentary group dissolved itself on September 10, 2019, when the majority of the Order and Justice parliamentary group's members founded a new parliamentary group called "For the Welfare of Lithuania" (which existed until mid-January 2020). On September 19, 2019, this parliamentary group signed a confidence and supply agreement with coalition's parties. On October 23, 2019, the Order and Justice group had been expelled from coalition. In spring, the members of the "For the Welfare of Lithuania" group joined the parliamentary groups of either Lithuanian Farmers and Greens Union or Social Democratic Labour Party of Lithuania.

On May 7, 2020, the Christian Union (consisting of 2 former members of the Homeland Union) decided to support the government.

Because the government was reaffirmed without the approval of its programme, the Constitutional Court of Lithuania ruled that the Constitution of Lithuania was breached. However, the ruling would not be officially announced until December 23 in order to allow the government to finish serving its term.

== Cabinet ==
| Position | Name | Party | Time | |
| Position | Name | Party | From | To |
|---|---|---|---|---|
| Prime Minister | Saulius Skvernelis | Independent (endorsed by LVŽS) | December 13, 2016 | December 11, 2020 |
| Education, Science and Sports | Jurgita Petrauskienė | Independent (endorsed by LVŽS) | December 13, 2016 | December 7, 2018 |
| Education, Science and Sports | Algirdas Monkevičius | Independent (endorsed by LVŽS) | January 15, 2019 | December 11, 2020 |
| Energy | Žygimantas Vaičiūnas | Independent (endorsed by LVŽS) | December 13, 2016 | December 11, 2020 |
| Finance | Vilius Šapoka | Independent (endorsed by LVŽS) | December 13, 2016 | December 11, 2020 |
| Economy and Innovation | Mindaugas Sinkevičius | LSDP | December 13, 2016 | October 13, 2017 |
| Economy and Innovation | Virginijus Sinkevičius | LVŽS | November 28, 2017 | November 30, 2019 |
| Economy and Innovation | Rimantas Sinkevičius | LSDDP | June 30, 2020 | December 11, 2020 |
| Transport and Communications | Rokas Masiulis | Independent (endorsed by LVŽS) | December 13, 2016 | August 7, 2019 |
| Transport and Communications | Jaroslav Narkevič | LLRA-KŠS | August 7, 2019 | December 11, 2020 |
| Culture | Liana Ruokytė-Jonsson | Independent (endorsed by LVŽS) | December 13, 2016 | December 21, 2018 |
| Culture | Mindaugas Kvietkauskas | Independent (endorsed by LVŽS) | January 11, 2019 | December 11, 2020 |
| Defence | Raimundas Karoblis | Independent (endorsed by LVŽS) | December 13, 2016 | December 11, 2020 |
| Social Security and Labour | Linas Kukuraitis | Independent (endorsed by LVŽS) | December 13, 2016 | December 11, 2020 |
| Agriculture | Bronius Markauskas | LVŽS | December 13, 2016 | May 14, 2018 |
| Agriculture | Giedrius Surplys | LVŽS | May 15, 2018 | August 7, 2019 |
| Agriculture | Andrius Palionis | LSDDP | August 7, 2019 | December 11, 2020 |
| Interior | Eimutis Misiūnas | Independent (endorsed by LVŽS) | December 13, 2016 | August 7, 2019 |
| Interior | Rita Tamašunienė | LLRA-KŠS | August 7, 2019 | December 11, 2020 |
| Foreign Affairs | Linas Antanas Linkevičius | LSDP | December 13, 2016 | December 11, 2020 |
| Foreign Affairs | Linas Antanas Linkevičius | Independent (endorsed by LSDDP) | December 13, 2016 | December 11, 2020 |
| Justice | Milda Vainiutė | Independent (endorsed by LSDP) | December 13, 2016 | March 6, 2018 |
| Justice | Elvinas Jankevičius | Independent (endorsed by LSDDP) | May 15, 2018 | December 11, 2020 |
| Environment | Kęstutis Navickas | Independent (endorsed by LVŽS) | December 13, 2016 | December 7, 2018 |
| Environment | Kęstutis Mažeika | LVŽS | April 4, 2019 | December 11, 2020 |
| Health | Aurelijus Veryga | LVŽS | December 13, 2016 | December 11, 2020 |
