= Ministry of Health (Lithuania) =

Government ministry of Lithuania

- Sveikatos apsaugos ministerija (in Lithuanian)
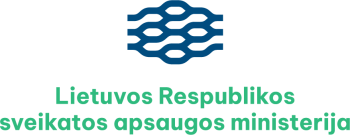

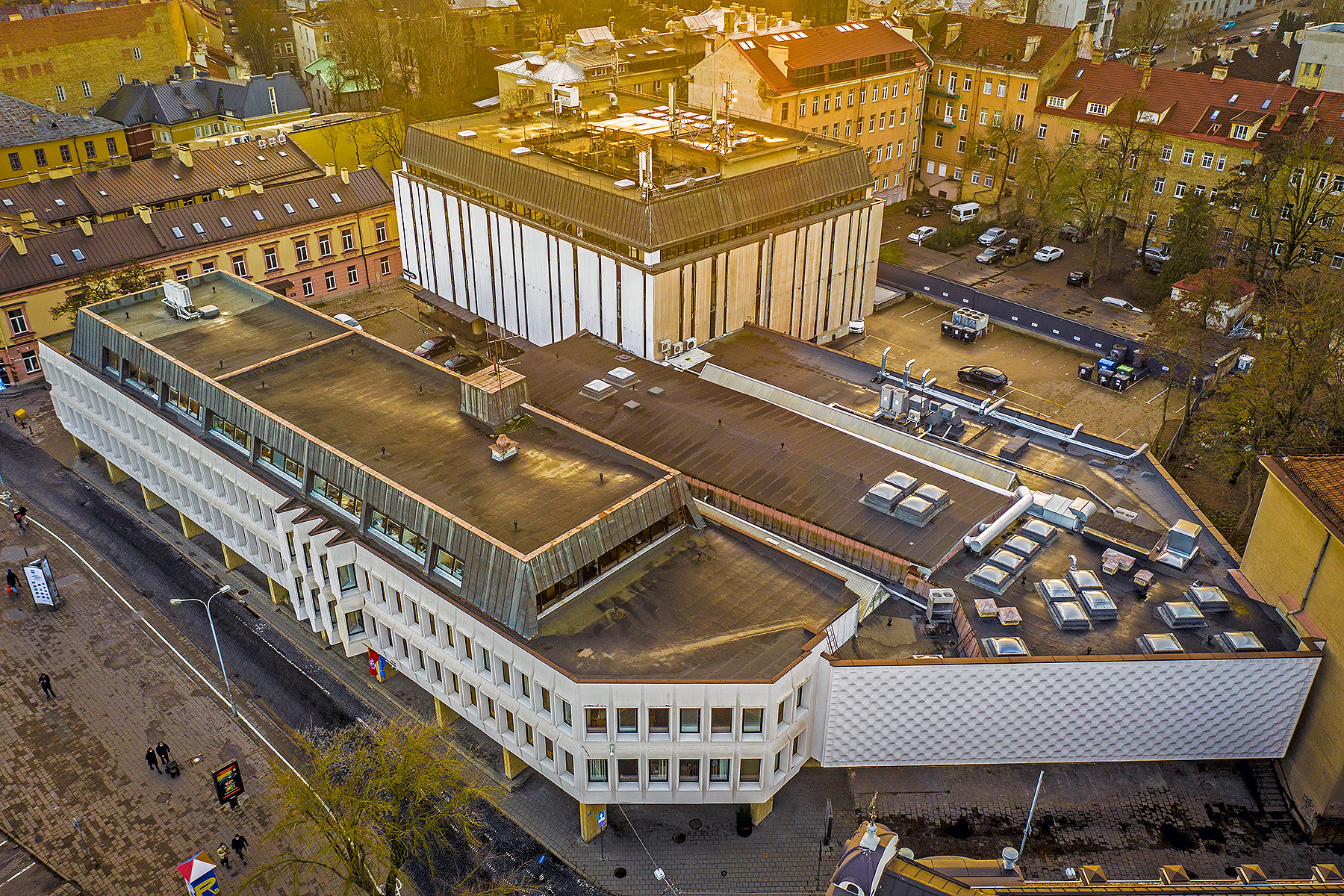

Ministry overview
- Formed: 17 January 1990; 36 years ago
- Jurisdiction: Government of Lithuania
- Headquarters: Vilniaus 33, Senamiestis, 01506 Vilnius
- Employees: 208 permanent employees (January 2021)
- Annual budget: ▲€1.424 billion (2024)
- Minister responsible: Linas Kukuraitis, 28th Minister for Health of Lithuania
- Website: sam.lrv.lt

Map
- 54°41′0.5″N 25°16′45.2″E

The Ministry of Health of the Republic of Lithuania (Lithuanian: Lietuvos Respublikos sveikatos apsaugos ministerija) is a government department of the Republic of Lithuania. Its operations are authorized by the Constitution of the Republic of Lithuania, decrees issued by the President and Prime Minister, and laws passed by the Seimas (Parliament). Its mission is to seek national unity and continue to build a state of wellbeing for all, where everyone could lead a dignified, comfortable, safe and healthy life.

== History ==
The predecessor of the ministry is considered to be the Health Department under Ministry of the Interior established on 11 November 1918. The ministry in its current form was established on 17 January 1990.

== Ministers ==
Christian Democratic Party Democratic Labour Party Farmers and Greens Union Homeland Union Labour Party Liberal and Centre Union New Union Social Democratic Party Independent

Ministry of Health
Term	Minister	Party	Cabinet	Office		
Term	Minister	Party	Cabinet	Start date	End date	Time in office
1	Juozas Olekas (born 1955)	Social Democratic Party	Prunskienė	17 January 1990	10 January 1991	358 days
2	Juozas Olekas (born 1955)	Social Democratic Party	Šimėnas	10 January 1991	13 January 1991	3 days
3	Juozas Olekas (born 1955)	Social Democratic Party	Vagnorius	13 January 1991	21 July 1992	1 year, 190 days
4	Juozas Olekas (born 1955)	Social Democratic Party	Abišala	21 July 1992	17 December 1992	149 days
5	Vytautas Kriauza (born 1955)	Christian Democratic Party	Lubys	17 December 1992	31 March 1993	104 days
6	Jurgis Brėdikis (born 1929)	Independent	Šleževičius	31 March 1993	10 November 1994	1 year, 224 days
7	Antanas Vinkus (born 1942)	Social Democratic Party	Šleževičius	10 November 1994	19 March 1996	2 years, 354 days
8	Antanas Vinkus (born 1942)	Social Democratic Party	Stankevičius	19 March 1996	10 December 1996	266 days
9	Juozas Galdikas (born 1958)	Homeland Union	Vagnorius	10 December 1996	25 March 1998	1 year, 105 days
10	Laurynas Stankevičius (1935–2017)	Democratic Labour Party	Vagnorius	25 March 1998	10 June 1999	1 year, 77 days
11	Raimundas Alekna (born 1959)	Homeland Union	Paksas	10 June 1999	11 November 1999	154 days
12	Raimundas Alekna (born 1959)	Homeland Union	Kubilius	11 November 1999	9 November 2000	364 days
13	Vinsas Janušonis (born 1950)	Independent	Paksas	9 November 2000	2 April 2001	144 days
14	Konstantinas Dobrovolskis (1939–2021)	New Union	Paksas	15 May 2001	12 July 2001	58 days
15	Konstantinas Dobrovolskis (1939–2021)	New Union	Brazauskas	12 July 2001	6 March 2003	1 year, 237 days
16	Juozas Olekas (born 1955)	Social Democratic Party	Brazauskas	6 March 2003	14 December 2004	1 year, 283 days
17	Žilvinas Padaiga (born 1956)	Labour Party	Brazauskas	14 December 2004	18 July 2006	1 year, 216 days
18	Rimvydas Turčinskas (born 1956)	Social Democratic Party	Kirkilas	18 July 2006	14 July 2008	1 year, 362 days
19	Gediminas Černiauskas (born 1957)	Social Democratic Party	Kirkilas	14 July 2008	9 December 2008	148 days
20	Algis Čaplikas (born 1962)	Liberal and Centre Union	Kubilius	9 December 2008	22 February 2010	1 year, 75 days
21	Raimondas Šukys (born 1966)	Liberal and Centre Union	Kubilius	22 February 2010	13 December 2012	2 years, 295 days
22	Vytenis Andriukaitis (born 1951)	Social Democratic Party	Butkevičius	13 December 2012	10 July 2014	1 year, 209 days
23	Rimantė Šalaševičiūtė (born 1954)	Social Democratic Party	Butkevičius	17 July 2014	17 February 2016	1 year, 215 days
24	Juras Požela (1982–2016)	Social Democratic Party	Butkevičius	10 March 2016	16 October 2016	220 days
25	Aurelijus Veryga (born 1976)	Farmers and Greens Union	Skvernelis	13 December 2016	11 December 2020	3 years, 364 days
26	Arūnas Dulkys (born 1972)	Independent	Šimonytė	11 December 2020	5 August 2024	3 years, 238 days
27	Marija Jakubauskienė (born 1978)	Independent	Paluckas; Ruginienė	12 December 2024	14 July 2026	317 days
