= Bronius Markauskas =

Lithuanian politician (born 1960)

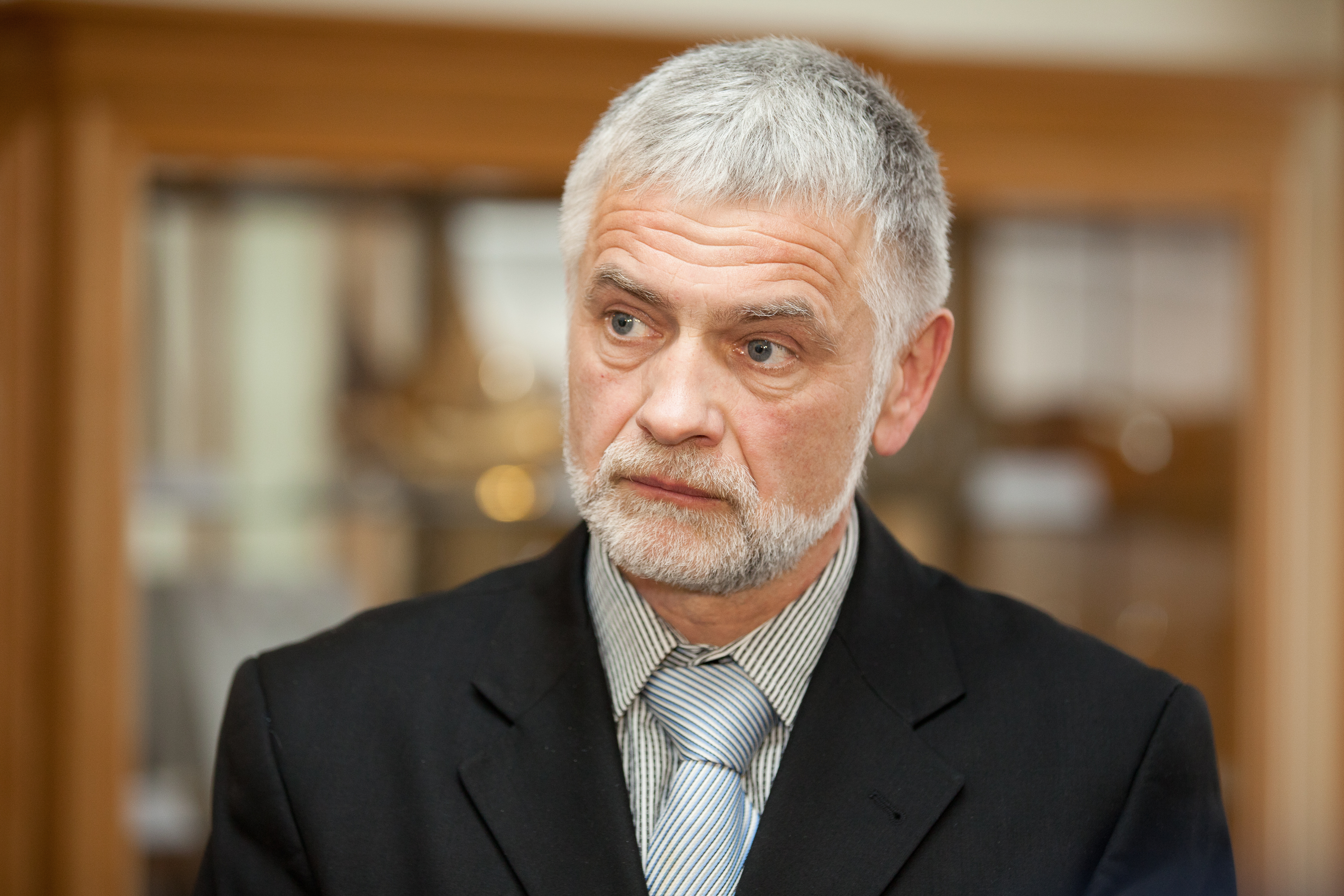
Bronius Markauskas

Bronius Markauskas (born 5 November 1960) is a Lithuanian politician. He served as Minister of Agriculture in the cabinet of Prime Minister Saulius Skvernelis from 13 December 2016 to 14 May 2018. Giedrius Surplys was appointed as his successor.

Political offices
| Preceded by Virginija Baltraitienė | Minister of Agriculture; 2016–2018 | Succeeded by Giedrius Surplys |
