= First Deputy Speaker of the Seimas =

- Seimo pirmininko pirmasis pavaduotojas
- Coat of Arms of the Seimas

- Logo of the Seimas
- Incumbent; Domas Griškevičius since 14 July 2026
- Reports to: Speaker of the Seimas
- Seat: Seimas Palace
- Appointer: Seimas
- Term length: Four years
- Formation: 13 November 1922
- First holder: Andrius Kubilius
- Deputy: Deputy Speaker of the Seimas
- Website: https://www.lrs.lt/

The First Deputy Speaker of the Seimas (Lithuanian: Seimo pirmininko pirmasis pavaduotojas) is a senior parliamentary position. The deputy assists the Speaker in overseeing parliamentary procedures, maintaining order during sessions, and representing the Seimas in the Speaker's absence. This role is vital in ensuring the smooth functioning of the legislative body. The First Deputy Speaker often takes on additional duties such as managing committee work or engaging in international parliamentary relations.

The current incumbent is Domas Griškevičius who took office 14 July 2026.

== First deputy speakers ==
Seimas	Name	From	To	Party
1996–2000	Andrius Kubilius	November 26, 1996	November 9, 1999	Homeland Union
1996–2000	Arvydas Vidžiūnas	November 9, 1999	October 18, 2000	Homeland Union
2000–2004	Česlovas Juršėnas	July 12, 2004	November 14, 2004	Social Democratic Party of Lithuania
2004–2008	Česlovas Juršėnas	October 10, 2006	March 31, 2008	Social Democratic Party of Lithuania
2004–2008	Algis Čaplikas	May 6, 2008	November 17, 2008	Liberal and Centre Union
2008–2012	Irena Degutienė	November 20, 2008	September 16, 2009	Homeland Union - Lithuanian Christian Democrats
2008–2012	Raimondas Šukys	September 24, 2009	March 10, 2010	Liberal and Centre Union
2012–2016	Vytautas Gapšys	November 16, 2012	October 3, 2013	Labour Party
2012–2016	Vydas Gedvilas	October 3, 2013	November 14, 2016	Labour Party
2016–2020	Rima Baškienė	November 14, 2016	November 12, 2020	Lithuanian Farmers and Greens Union
2020–2024	Jurgis Razma	November 13, 2020	November 14, 2024	Homeland Union - Lithuanian Christian Democrats
2024–2028	Juozas Olekas	November 14, 2024	September 10, 2025	Social Democratic Party of Lithuania
2024–2028	Raimondas Šukys	September 11, 2025	July 14, 2026	Dawn of Nemunas
2024–2028	Domas Griškevičius	July 14, 2026	present	Union of Democrats "For Lithuania"
