= Financial Crime Investigation Service =

Lithuanian law enforcement agency

Financial Crime Investigation Service Finansinių Nusikaltimų Tyrimo Tarnyba
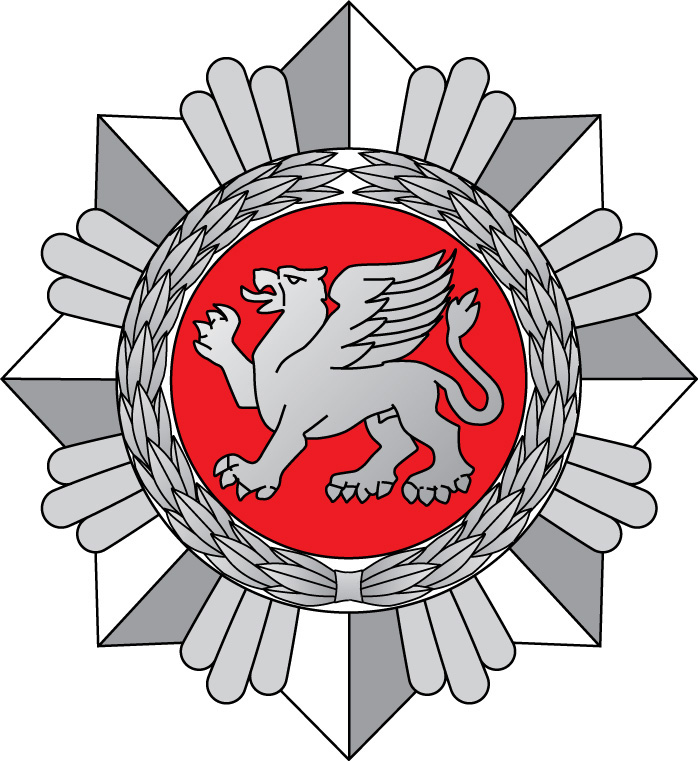
- Insignia of Financial Crime Investigation Service

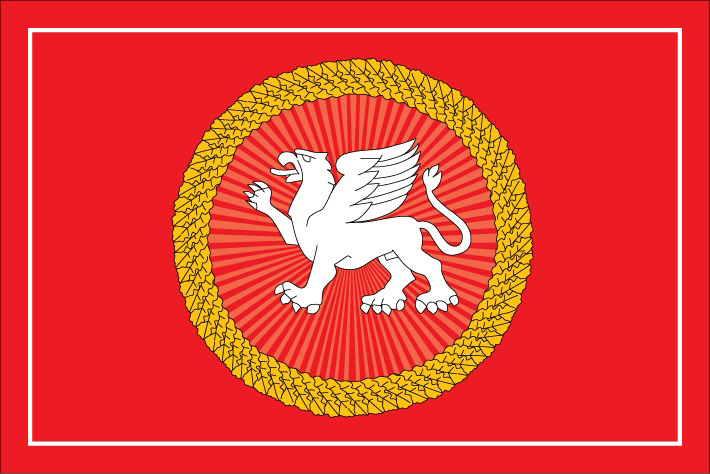
- Flag of Financial Crime Investigation Service
- Abbreviation: FNTT

Agency overview
- Formed: February 4, 1997; 29 years ago

Jurisdictional structure
- National agency: Lithuania
- Operations jurisdiction: Lithuania
- Governing body: Ministry of the Interior of the Republic of Lithuania

Operational structure
- Headquarters: Sporto str. 16, LT-09238 Vilnius, Lithuania
- Agency executive: Antonis Mikulskis, Director

Website
- fntt.lt

The Financial Crime Investigation Service (FNTT; Lithuanian: Finansinių nusikaltimų tyrimo tarnyba) is a Lithuanian law enforcement agency under the Ministry of the Interior. It is primarily responsible for investigating the financial crime and money laundering.

== History ==
The institution was first established on 4 February 1997 as a Tax Police Department under the Ministry of the Interior. In 2002 it was reorganized and renamed to the Financial Crime Investigation Service. Since 2002 it also closely cooperates with the European Anti-Fraud Office.

== Notable cases ==
In October 2018 it announced that it had detected a fraud against the National Health Insurance Fund where more than 1,200 Polish people were given fake employment contracts in Lithuania to get refunds of healthcare costs to which they were not entitled. They did not in fact work in Lithuania, but claimed to be eligible for sickness and maternity benefits under European Union law. 120,000 euros were transferred from the fund in respect of 420 bogus employees to the Narodowy Fundusz Zdrowia before the fraud was detected.
