= Ieva Andriulaitytė =

Lithuanian politician

- Andriulaitytė in 2026

Minister of Environment
- Incumbent
- Assumed office 14 July 2026
- Prime Minister: Mindaugas Sinkevičius
- Preceded by: Kastytis Žuromskas

Personal details
- Born: 1978 (age 47–48) Jurbarkas
- Party: Independent

Ieva Andriulaitytė (born 1978 in Jurbarkas) is a Lithuanian politician serving as minister of environment since 2026. From 2016 to 2026, she served as representative of the Association of Local Authorities in Lithuania to the European Union.

After graduating from what is now Jurbarkas Gymnasium in 1996, Ieva Andriulaitytė completed her bachelor's and master's studies in environmental engineering at Vilnius Gediminas Technical University. She also earned a master's degree in public administration from Mykolas Romeris University.
