= Ministry of Agriculture (Lithuania) =

Government ministry of Lithuania

- Žemės ūkio ministerija (in Lithuanian)
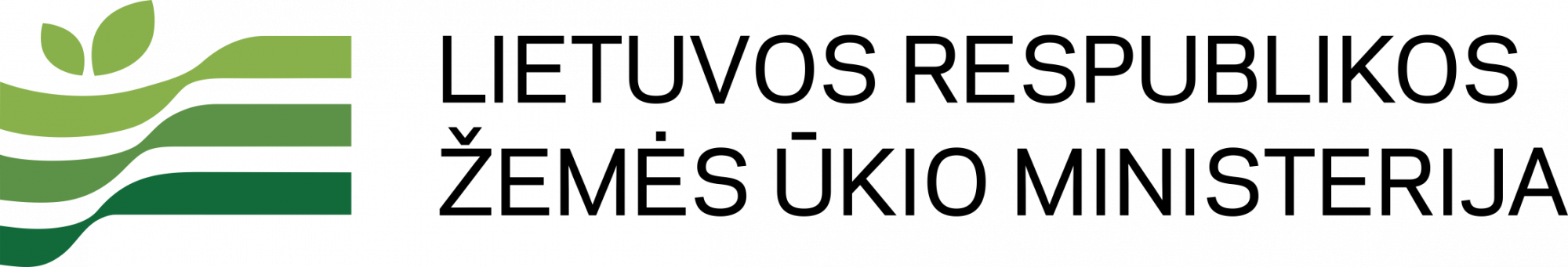

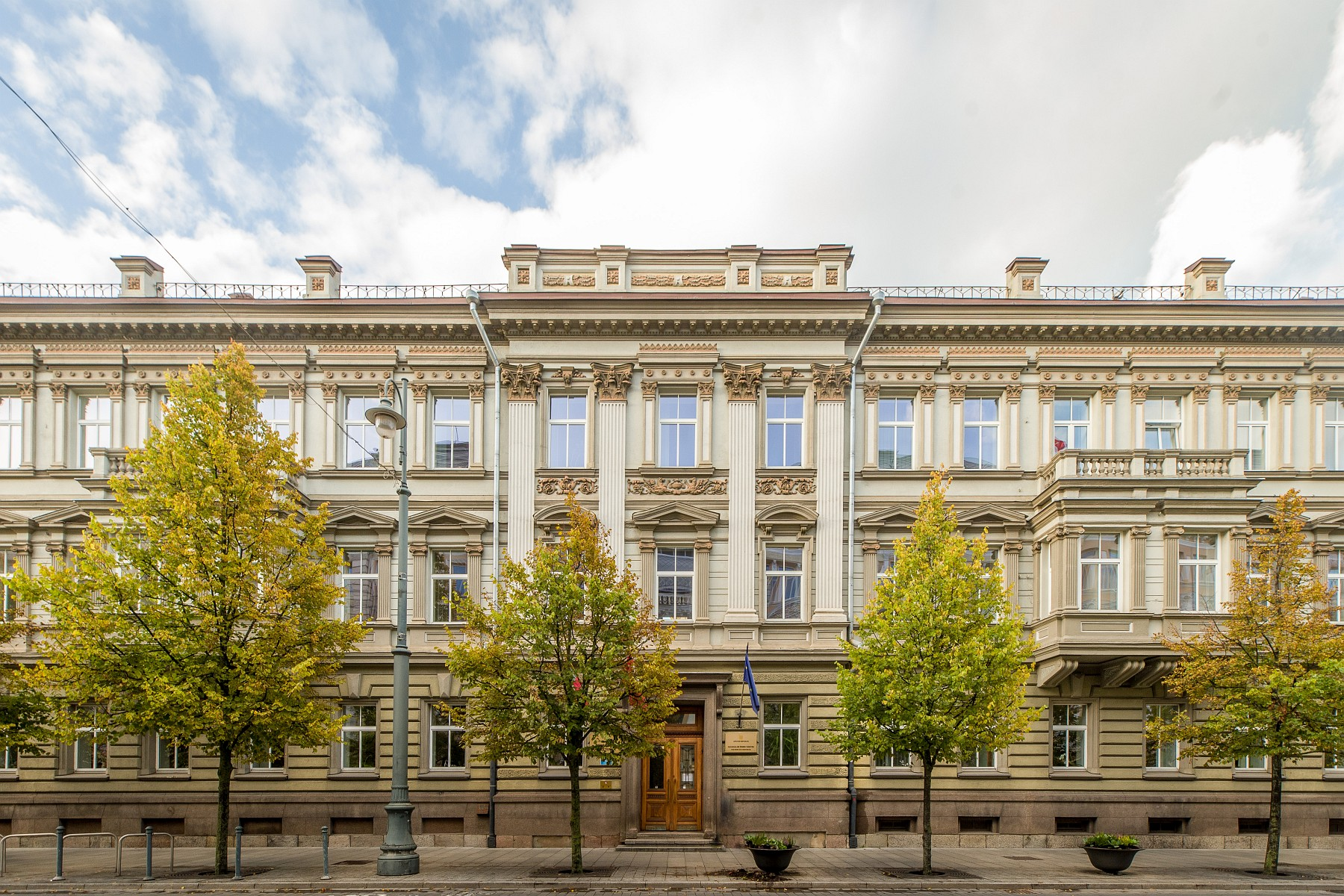

Ministry overview
- Formed: 11 November 1918; 107 years ago
- Jurisdiction: Government of Lithuania
- Headquarters: Gedimino 19, Naujamiestis, 01103 Vilnius
- Employees: 287 permanent employees (January 2022)
- Annual budget: €1.157 billion (2022)
- Minister responsible: Kęstutis Mažeika, 60th Minister for Agriculture of Lithuania
- Website: zum.lrv.lt

Map
- 54°41′15.6″N 25°16′38.9″E

The Ministry of Agriculture of the Republic of Lithuania (Lithuanian: Lietuvos Respublikos žemės ūkio ministerija) is a government department of the Republic of Lithuania. Its operations are authorized by the Constitution of the Republic of Lithuania, decrees issued by the President and Prime Minister, and laws passed by the Seimas (Parliament). Its mission is to prosecute state policy realization and coordination in ranges of land, food, fishery, village development, agriculture. The current head of the Ministry is Kęstutis Navickas.

== History ==
The ministry was first established on 11 November 1918, as the Ministry of Agriculture and State Assets (Lithuanian: Žemės ūkio ir valstybės turtų ministerija) of the Republic of Lithuania. Its first minister was Juozas Tūbelis. It was renamed to the Ministry of Agriculture on 21 June 1924.

== Corruption scandals ==
Lithuania’s Ministry of Agriculture, along with its affiliated agencies and state-owned enterprises under the Ministry’s supervision, has been involved in multiple corruption scandals, including a record-breaking bribery case in 2025.

== Ministers ==
Ministry of Agriculture and State Wealth
Term	Minister for Agriculture and State Wealth	Office			Political Party	Cabinet	Prime Minister
Term	Minister for Agriculture and State Wealth	Start Date	End Date	Duration	Political Party	Cabinet	Prime Minister
1	Juozas Tūbelis (1882-1939)	1918-11-11	1918-12-26	45 days	Nationalist Union	#1	Voldemaras
2	Juozas Tūbelis (1882-1939)	1918-12-26	1919-03-05	69 days	Nationalist Union	#2	Sleževičius
3	Aleksandras Stulginskis (1882-1939)	1919-04-12	1919-10-07	178 days	Christian Democratic Party	#4	Sleževičius
4	Juozas Tūbelis (1882-1939)	1919-10-07	1920-06-19	256 days	Nationalist Union	#5	Galvanauskas
5	Jonas Pranas Aleksa (1879-1955)	1920-06-19	1922-02-02	1 year, 228 days	Independent	#6	Grinius
6	Jonas Pranas Aleksa (1879-1955)	1922-02-02	1923-02-22	1 year, 20 days	Independent	#7	Galvanauskas
7	Jonas Pranas Aleksa (1879-1955)	1923-02-22	1923-06-29	127 days	Independent	#8	Galvanauskas
Ministry of Agriculture
Term	Minister for Agriculture	Office			Political Party	Cabinet	Prime Minister
Term	Minister for Agriculture	Start Date	End Date	Duration	Political Party	Cabinet	Prime Minister
8	Mykolas Krupavičius (1885-1970)	1923-06-29	1924-06-18	355 days	Independent	#9	Galvanauskas
9	Mykolas Krupavičius (1885-1970)	1924-06-18	1925-02-04	231 days	Independent	#10	Tumėnas
10	Mykolas Krupavičius (1885-1970)	1925-02-04	1925-09-25	233 days	Independent	#11	Petrulis
11	Mykolas Krupavičius (1885-1970)	1925-09-25	1926-06-15	263 days	Independent	#12	Bistras
12	Mykolas Krupavičius (1885-1970)	1926-06-15	1926-12-17	185 days	Independent	#13	Sleževičius
13	Jonas Pranas Aleksa (1879-1955)	1926-12-17	1929-09-23	2 years, 280 days	Independent	#14	Voldemaras
14	Jonas Pranas Aleksa (1879-1955)	1929-09-23	1934-06-12	4 years, 262 days	Independent	#15	Tūbelis
15	Jonas Pranas Aleksa (1879-1955)	1934-06-12	1935-09-06	1 year, 86 days	Independent	#16	Tūbelis
16	Stasys Putvinskis (1898-1942)	1935-09-06	1938-03-24	2 years, 199 days	Independent	#17	Tūbelis
17	Juozas Tūbelis (1882-1939)	1938-03-24	1938-11-01	222 days	Nationalist Union	#18	Mironas
18	Vladas Mironas (1880-1953)	1938-11-01	1938-12-05	34 days	Nationalist Union	#18	Mironas
19	Juozas Skaisgiris (1901-1977)	1938-12-05	1939-03-28	113 days	Nationalist Union	#19	Mironas
20	Jurgis Krikščiūnas (1894-1947)	1939-03-28	1939-11-21	238 days	Popular Peasants' Union	#20	Černius
21	Juozas Audėnas (1898-1982)	1939-11-21	1940-06-15	207 days	Popular Peasants' Union	#21	Merkys
People's Commissariat of Agriculture
Term	People's Commissioner for Agriculture	Office			Political Party	Cabinet	Prime Minister
Term	People's Commissioner for Agriculture	Start Date	End Date	Duration	Political Party	Cabinet	Prime Minister
22	Matas Mickis (1896-1960)	1940-06-15	1941-01-31	230 days	Communist Party	#22	Gedvilas
23	Bronius Pušinis (1888-1967)	1941-01-31	1944-01-07	2 years, 341 days	Communist Party	#22	Gedvilas
24	Jonas Laurinaitis (1900-1981)	1944-01-07	1945-09-10	1 year, 246 days	Communist Party	#22	Gedvilas
25	Vladas Vildžiūnas (1909-1962)	1945-09-10	1947-03-13	1 year, 184 days	Communist Party	#22	Gedvilas
26	Kazimieras Liaudis (1901-1989)	1947-03-13	1950-07-29	3 years, 138 days	Communist Party	#22	Gedvilas
27	Vladas Augustinaitis (1898-1976)	1950-07-29	1954-01-01	3 years, 156 days	Communist Party	#22	Gedvilas
28	Vladas Augustinaitis (1898-1976)	1954-01-01	1956-05-10	2 years, 130 days	Communist Party	#22	Gedvilas
29	Vytautas Vazalinskas (1910-1984)	1956-05-10	1965-04-07	8 years, 332 days	Communist Party	#23	Šumauskas
30	Medardas Grigaliūnas (1925-2014)	1965-04-07	1967-04-14	2 years, 7 days	Communist Party	#23	Šumauskas
31	Medardas Grigaliūnas (1925-2014)	1967-04-14	1981-01-16	13 years, 277 days	Communist Party	#24	Maniušis
32	Medardas Grigaliūnas (1925-2014)	1981-01-16	1986-01-02	4 years, 351 days	Communist Party	#25	Songaila
33	Juozas Bernatavičius (Born in 1969)	1986-01-02	1990-01-17	4 years, 15 days	Communist Party	#26	Sakalauskas
Ministry of Agriculture
Term	Minister for Agriculture	Office			Political Party	Cabinet	Prime Minister
Term	Minister for Agriculture	Start Date	End Date	Duration	Political Party	Cabinet	Prime Minister
34	Vytautas Knašys (Born in 1937)	1990-01-17	1991-01-10	358 days	Homeland Union	#27	Prunskienė
35	Vytautas Knašys (Born in 1937)	1991-01-10	1991-01-13	3 days	Homeland Union	#28	Šimėnas
36	Rimvydas Survila (Born in 1939)	1991-01-13	1992-07-21	1 year, 190 days	Homeland Union	#29	Vagnorius
37	Rimvydas Survila (Born in 1939)	1992-07-21	1992-12-17	149 days	Homeland Union	#30	Vagnorius
38	Rimantas Karazija (1936-2012)	1992-12-17	1993-03-31	104 days	Independent	#31	Lubys
39	Rimantas Karazija (1936-2012)	1993-03-31	1994-09-26	1 year, 179 days	Independent	#32	Šleževičius
40	Vytautas Einoris (1930-2019)	1994-09-26	1996-03-19	1 year, 175 days	Democratic Labour Party	#32	Šleževičius
41	Vytautas Einoris (1930-2019)	1996-03-19	1996-12-10	266 days	Democratic Labour Party	#33	Stankevičius
Ministry of Agriculture and Forestry
Term	Minister for Agriculture and Forestry	Office			Political Party	Cabinet	Prime Minister
Term	Minister for Agriculture and Forestry	Start Date	End Date	Duration	Political Party	Cabinet	Prime Minister
42	Edvardas Makelis (Born in 1954)	1996-12-10	1999-06-10	2 years, 182 days	Independent	#34	Vagnorius
Ministry of Agriculture
Term	Minister for Agriculture	Office			Political Party	Cabinet	Prime Minister
Term	Minister for Agriculture	Start Date	End Date	Duration	Political Party	Cabinet	Prime Minister
43	Edvardas Makelis (Born in 1954)	1999-06-10	1999-11-11	154 days	Independent	#35	Paksas
44	Edvardas Makelis (Born in 1954)	1999-11-11	2000-11-09	364 days	Independent	#36	Kubilius
45	Kęstutis Kristinaitis (Born in 1961)	2000-11-09	2001-07-12	245 days	Independent	#37	Paksas
46	Kęstutis Kristinaitis (Born in 1961)	2001-07-12	2001-10-03	83 days	Independent	#38	Brazauskas
47	Jeronimas Kraujelis (Born in 1938)	2001-10-03	2004-12-14	3 years, 72 days	New Union	#38	Brazauskas
48	Kazimira Danutė Prunskienė (1943-2026)	2004-12-14	2006-07-18	1 year, 216 days	Popular Peasant's Union	#39	Brazauskas
49	Kazimira Danutė Prunskienė (1943-2026)	2006-07-18	2008-12-09	2 years, 144 days	Popular Peasant's Union	#40	Kirkilas
50	Kazimieras Starkevičius (Born 1956)	2006-07-18	2008-12-09	2 years, 144 days	Homeland Union	#41	Kubilius
51	Vigilijus Jukna (Born in 1968)	2008-12-09	2014-07-17	5 years, 220 days	Labour Party	#42	Butkevičius
52	Virginija Baltraitienė (Born in 1958)	2014-07-17	2016-12-13	2 years, 149 days	Labour Party	#42	Butkevičius
53	Bronius Markauskas (Born in 1960)	2016-12-13	2018-05-15	1 year, 153 days	Farmers and Greens Union	#43	Saulius Skvernelis
54	Giedrius Surplys (Born in 1980)	2018-05-15	2019-08-07	1 year, 84 days	Farmers and Greens Union	#43	Saulius Skvernelis
55	Andrius Palionis (Born in 1975)	2019-08-07	2020-12-11	1 year, 126 days	Social Democratic Labour Party	#43	Saulius Skvernelis
56	Kęstutis Navickas (Born in 1970)	2020-12-11	2024-08-05	3 years, 238 days	Homeland Union	#44	Šimonytė
57	Kazys Starkevičius (Born in 1956)	2024-08-05	2024-12-12	129 days	Homeland Union	#44	Šimonytė
58	Ignas Hofmanas (Born in 1984)	2024-12-12	2025-09-25	287 days	Independent (endorsed by PPNA)	#45	Paluckas
59	Andrius Palionis (Born in 1975)	2025-09-25	Incumbent	339 days	Independent (endorsed by PPNA)	#46	Ruginienė
