= Vytautas Einoris =

Lithuanian politician

Vytautas Einoris (7 February 1930 – 7 January 2019) was a Lithuanian agronomist, politician, former member of the Seimas and Minister of Agriculture.

== Biography ==
Einoris was born in Urnėniškis village in what is now Kupiškis District, Lithuania, on 7 February 1930. Einoris was one of 12 children in a peasant family.

From 1948 Einoris studied and worked in the agricultural sector of the Lithuanian SSR, starting off as an agricultural technician, zootechnician, later becoming the head of a collective farm, before joining the agricultural administration apparatus as a deputy in the Biržai district executive committee in 1959. He slowly rose through the ranks, becoming the Minister of the newly established Fruits and Vegetables Ministry of Lithuanian SSR in 1981. After the ministry was abolished in 1985, Einoris worked as the first deputy of the Lithuanian State Agroindustrial committee. Between 1988 and 1989 he worked as the Chairman of the Committee of Environmental Protection.

Einoris had been a member of the Communist Party of Lithuania since 1956 and was elected to the Supreme Soviet of the Lithuanian SSR in 1984 (reelected in 1985). He joined the ranks of Democratic Labour Party of Lithuania (LDDP) after the independence and in 1993 was appointed the ambassador to Kazakhstan. Einoris returned from the diplomatic mission in 1994, when he was invited to join the government of Adolfas Šleževičius as the Minister of Agriculture. After Šleževičius was forced to resign in 1995, he remained part of the government under Laurynas Stankevičius until 1996.

In a special election in 1995, Einoris was elected as the member of the Sixth Seimas in the single seat constituency of Kaišiadorys (59), replacing Algirdas Brazauskas who had given up his parliamentary mandate after being elected the President of Lithuania in 1993. Einoris was reelected to the Seventh Seimas in 1996 (through the electoral list of LDDP) and to the Eighth Seimas in 2000 (in the single-seat constituency of Pakruojis-Joniškis). He became a member of the Social Democratic Party of Lithuania after the party merged with LDDP in 2001.
