= Andrius Palionis =

Lithuanian politician

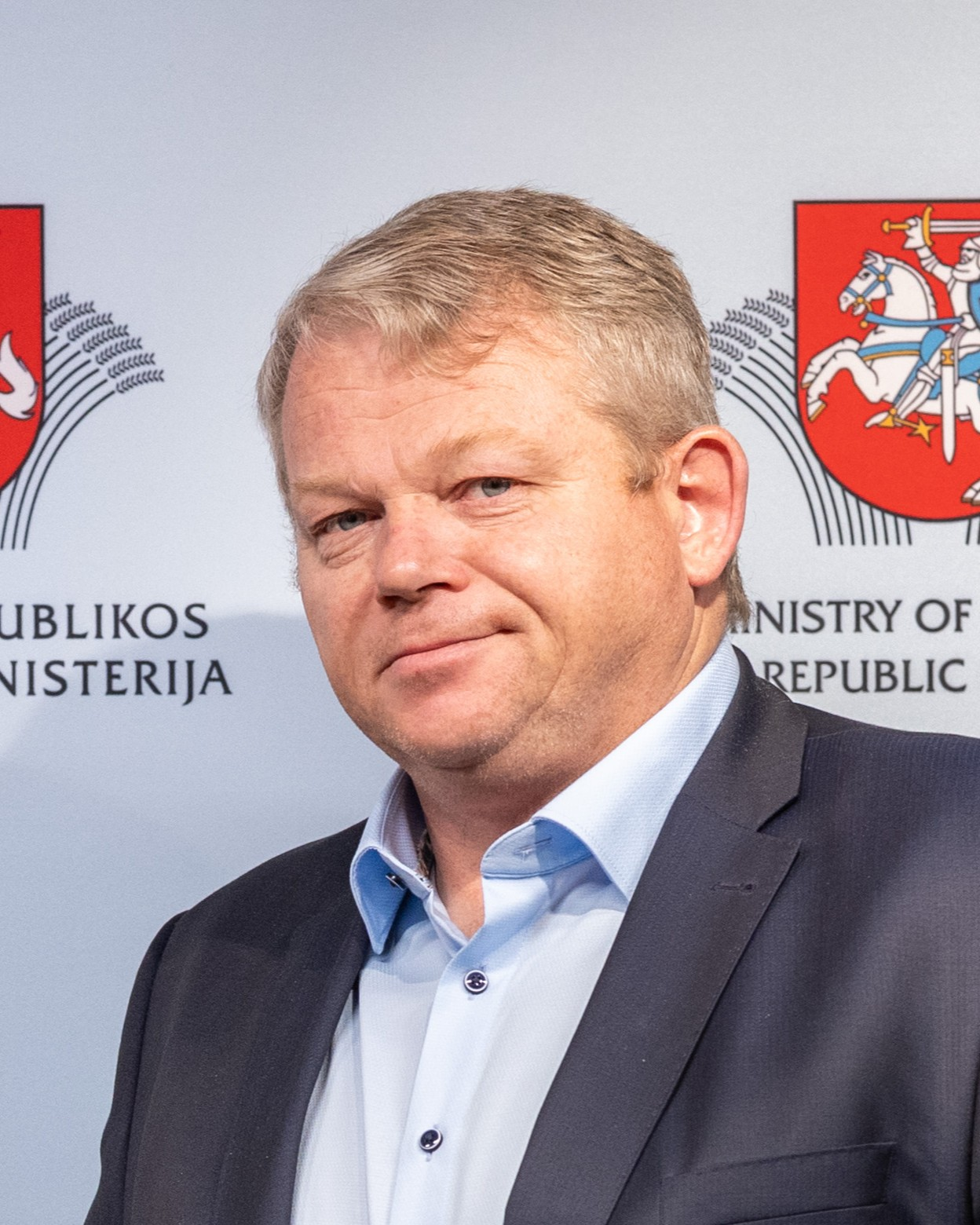
- Palionis in 2026

Minister of Agriculture
- In office 25 September 2025 – 14 July 2026
- Prime Minister: Inga Ruginienė
- Preceded by: Ignas Hofmanas
- Succeeded by: Kęstutis Mažeika
- In office 7 August 2019 – 11 December 2020
- Prime Minister: Saulius Skvernelis
- Preceded by: Giedrius Surplys
- Succeeded by: Kęstutis Navickas

Personal details
- Born: 5 June 1975 (age 51)
- Party: Social Democratic Labour Party of Lithuania

Andrius Palionis (born 5 June 1975) is a Lithuanian politician. He served as Minister of Agriculture in the cabinet of Prime Minister Saulius Skvernelis from 7 August 2019 to 11 December 2020. He served again in the cabinet of Inga Ruginienė from 25 September 2025 to 14 July 2026. He is affiliated with the Social Democratic Labour Party of Lithuania.

Political offices
Preceded by Giedrius Surplys	Minister of Agriculture; 2019–2020	Succeeded by Kęstutis Navickas
