= Kęstutis Mažeika =

Lithuanian politician

Minister of Agriculture
- Incumbent
- Assumed office 14 July 2026
- Prime Minister: Mindaugas Sinkevičius
- Preceded by: Andrius Palionis

Minister of Environment
- In office 4 April 2019 – 11 December 2020
- Prime Minister: Saulius Skvernelis
- Preceded by: Kęstutis Navickas
- Succeeded by: Simonas Gentvilas

Personal details
- Born: 28 April 1982 (age 44) Marijampolė, Lithuania
- Party: DSVL

Kęstutis Mažeika (born 28 April 1982) is a Lithuanian politician. He currently serves as Minister of Agriculture in the cabinet of Prime Minister Mindaugas Sinkevičius since 14 July 2026. He previously served as Minister of Environment in the cabinet of Prime Minister Saulius Skvernelis from 4 April 2019 to 11 December 2020.
