= Ministry of Environment (Lithuania) =

Government ministry of Lithuania

- Aplinkos ministerija (in Lithuanian)

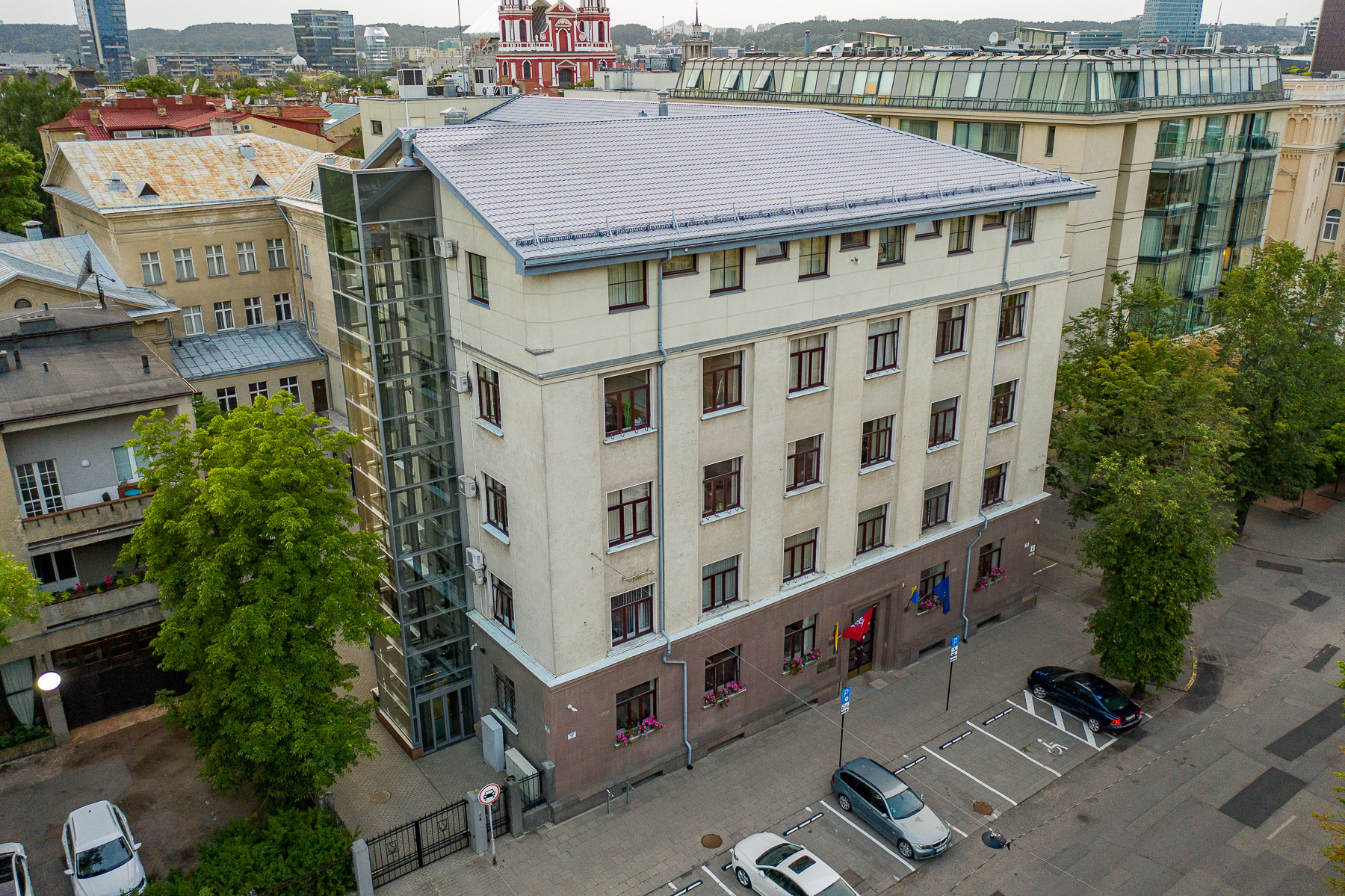

Ministry overview
- Formed: 31 March 1993; 33 years ago
- Jurisdiction: Government of Lithuania
- Headquarters: A. Jakšto 4, Senamiestis, 01105 Vilnius
- Employees: 245 permanent employees (January 2021)
- Annual budget: ▲€554 million (2024)
- Minister responsible: Ieva Andriulaitytė, 21st Minister for Environment of Lithuania
- Website: am.lrv.lt

Map
- 54°41′20.4″N 25°16′30.3″E

The Ministry of Environment of the Republic of Lithuania (Lithuanian: Lietuvos Respublikos aplinkos ministerija) oversees the environment and natural resources in Lithuania. Its mission is:

- To implement the principle of sustainable development;
- To set preconditions for rational utilization, protection and restoration of natural resources;
- To ensure provision of information about the state of environment and its forecasts to the public;
- To create conditions for the development of construction business and the provision of residents with housing;
- To ensure a proper environmental quality, taking into account the norms and standards of the European Union.

The Environment Protection Department, accountable to the Supreme Council – Reconstituent Seimas, was established to oversee environment protection and exploitation of natural resources after Lithuania restored its independence in 1990. In 1996, the department was reorganized into Ministry of Environmental Protection. In 1998, after the merger with Ministry of Housing and Urban Development, it was renamed to Ministry of Environment. Thus it became responsible for construction, territorial planning, and housing. The Ministry has numerous divisions and subordinate institutions responsible for protected areas, environment protection, geological survey, forestry, metrology, meteorology services, and marine research. The Ministry also runs the Tadas Ivanauskas Zoological Museum.

== Ministers ==
Democratic Labour Party Farmers and Greens Union Homeland Union Liberal Movement Liberal Union New Union Order and Justice Party Social Democratic Party Independent

Ministry of Environmental Protection
Term	Minister	Party	Cabinet	Office		
Term	Minister	Party	Cabinet	Start date	End date	Time in office
1	Bronius Bradauskas (born 1944)	Democratic Labour Party	Šleževičius	31 March 1993	19 March 1996	2 years, 354 days
2	Bronius Bradauskas (born 1944)	Democratic Labour Party	Stankevičius	19 March 1996	10 December 1996	266 days
Ministry of Environment
Term	Minister	Party	Cabinet	Office		
Term	Minister	Party	Cabinet	Start date	End date	Time in office
3	Imantas Lazdinis (born 1944)	Independent	Vagnorius	10 December 1996	25 March 1998	1 year, 105 days
4	Algis Čaplikas (born 1962)	Independent	Vagnorius	25 March 1998	5 March 1999	345 days
5	Danius Lygis (born 1948)	Homeland Union	Vagnorius	8 April 1999	10 June 1999	63 days
6	Danius Lygis (born 1948)	Homeland Union	Paksas	10 June 1999	11 November 1999	154 days
7	Danius Lygis (born 1948)	Liberal Union	Kubilius	11 November 1999	9 November 2000	364 days
8	Henrikas Žukauskas (born 1951)	Homeland Union	Paksas	9 November 2000	12 July 2001	245 days
9	Arūnas Kundrotas (born 1963)	Social Democratic Party	Brazauskas	12 July 2001	14 December 2004	3 years, 155 days
10	Arūnas Kundrotas (born 1963)	Social Democratic Party	Brazauskas	14 December 2004	18 July 2006	1 year, 216 days
11	Arūnas Kundrotas (born 1963)	Social Democratic Party	Kirkilas	18 July 2006	31 January 2008	1 year, 197 days
12	Artūras Paulauskas (born 1963)	New Union	Kirkilas	31 January 2008	9 December 2008	313 days
13	Gediminas Kazlauskas (born 1959)	Independent	Kubilius	9 December 2008	13 December 2012	4 years, 4 days
14	Valentinas Mazuronis (born 1953)	Order and Justice Party	Butkevičius	13 December 2012	15 June 2014	1 year, 184 days
15	Kęstutis Trečiokas (born 1957)	Order and Justice Party	Butkevičius	17 July 2014	13 December 2016	2 years, 149 days
16	Kęstutis Navickas (born 1970)	Independent	Skvernelis	13 December 2016	7 December 2018	1 year, 359 days
17	Kęstutis Mažeika (born 1982)	Farmers and Greens Union	Skvernelis	4 April 2019	11 December 2020	1 year, 251 days
18	Simonas Gentvilas (born 1984)	Liberal Movement	Šimonytė Paluckas	11 December 2020	12 December 2024	4 years, 1 day
19	Povilas Poderskis	Independent	Šimonytė Paluckas	12 December 2024	Incumbent	
