= Raimundas Alekna =

Lithuanian psychotherapist, politician and psychiatrist

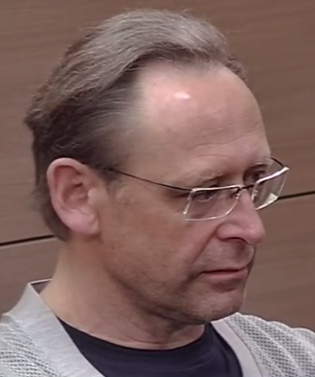
- Alkena in September 2013

Mayor of Vilnius
- In office 15 December 2010 – 19 April 2011
- Preceded by: Vilius Navickas
- Succeeded by: Artūras Zuokas

Minister of Health
- In office 10 June 1999 – 9 November 2000

Personal details
- Born: 16 April 1959 (age 66) Subačius, Lithuanian SSR, Soviet Union
- Party: Homeland Union (since 1993)

Raimundas Alekna (born on 16 April 1959), is a Lithuanian politician, psychiatrist psychotherapist, and former athlete who served as the Mayor of Vilnius from 2010 to 2011. He also served as the Minister of Health from 1999 to 2000.

== Biography ==
Alekna was born on 16 April 1959.

Between 1976 and 1980, he was part of the Lithuanian national athletics team. A fracture in her right arm healed sufficiently and Alekna was no longer able to compete as a decathlon athlete.

After graduating from the sports boarding school in 1977, Alekna was only admitted to study medicine after the third attempt to apply in 1979.

In 1985, Alekna completed his studies at the Medical Institute in Kaunas, and in 1986 he completed his internship in psychiatry, and became a physician psychiatrist.

From 1986 to 1988, he was part of the Panevezys City Ambulance Station and Panevezys Hospital Psychiatrist. From 1988 he was the head of the psychoneurology department of the polyclinic, and from 1990 he was an assistant at the psychiatry clinic of the Kaunas Medical Academy.

From 1990 to 1992 he was an assistant at the Psychiatry Clinic of the Kauno medicinos akademija.

Between 1992 and 1995, he was the Non-full chief psychiatrist of the Panevezys region.

In 1993, he joined the Homeland Union Party. That same year, he received the highest qualification category of a physician psychiatrist.

In 1995, he was the member of the Panevezys city council, and at the same time, he was the deputy mayor.

In 1996, he ran for the Seimas from the Homeland Union list, but did not win a seat. In 1997, he received first qualification category of a physician psychotherapist. The same year, he entered the Seimas in place of the deceased Romualdas Sikorskis. He was then appointed secretary of the Ministry of Health.

On 10 June 1999, Alekna became the Minister of Health.

On 9 November 2000, he left office to become the Chief Physician of Vilnius Dawn Gate Hospital.

In 2002, he was the Director of the Center for Psychotherapy and Psychoanalysis. In 2003, he was elected to the Vilnius city council.

He successfully ran in the parliamentary elections in 2008, entering the Seimas from the TS-LKD list. Before the first session of the parliament of the new term, he submitted a declaration of refusal to take up the mandate, remaining in the local government.

From 2009 to December 2010 he was an advisor to Lithuanian Prime Minister Andrius Kubilius. On 15 December 2010, he was elected mayor of Vilnius.

He left office on 19 April 2011.

From 2013 to 2014, he was the Director of the Ąžuolynas Clinic.

== Family ==
Alekna is married for the second time. He married his first wife in his second year of college and has two sons with her. He has a son and a daughter with his second wife.
