= Bulgaria–Lithuania relations =

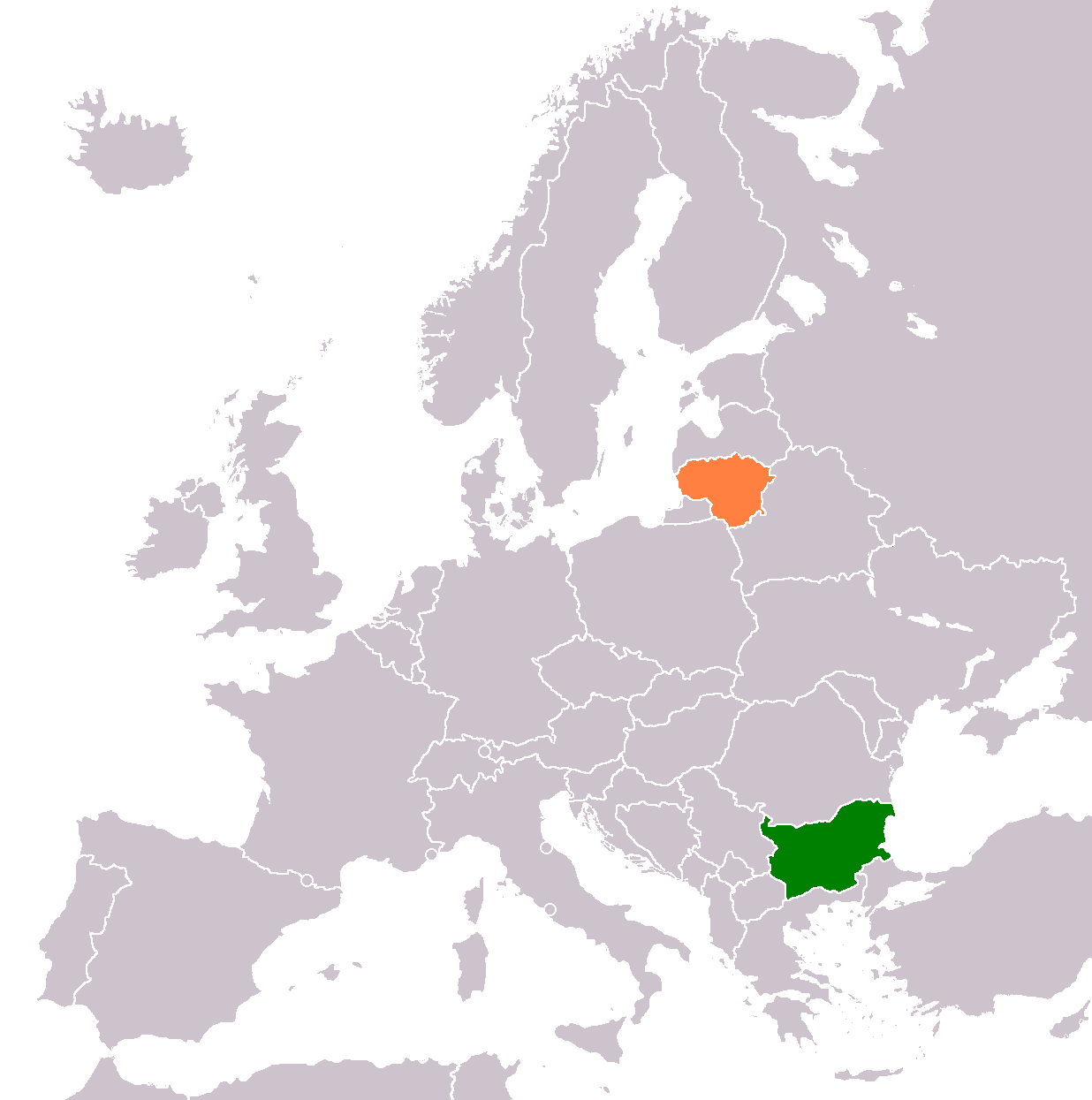

- Bulgaria: Lithuania

Bulgaria–Lithuania relations are the bilateral relations between Bulgaria and Lithuania. Both countries are full members of the Council of Europe, European Union and NATO.

== History ==
=== Early contacts during the Grand Duchy of Lithuania ===
In 1444, Jogaila's son Władysław III was killed in a battle with the Turks near Varna.

During the Great Turkish War, the Polish-Lithuanian Commonwealth fought alongside Bulgarian rebels against the Ottoman Empire and its vassal states.

=== Relations when Lithuania was part of the Russian Empire ===
During the Russo-Turkish War of 1877–1878, 36 soldiers from Vilnius, Kaunas, and Grodno governorates died in 1877 alone. K. Khrutskis, who was born and raised in the Vilnius area, distinguished himself in the battles for Bulgarian freedom at the Battle of Shipka Pass.

From 1880 to 1905, with a two-year break, Dr. Jonas Basanavičius lived and practiced medicine in the cities of Varna and Lom in Bulgaria. In 1889, Basanavičius wrote and published in 1891 the scientific work "Materials of Bulgarian Sanitary Ethnography. I. Lom District (1880–1889)". This monograph devoted much space to the history of the region, archaeology, anthropology, economics, ethnography, medicine, education, folklore and natural problems. On 16 November 1891, he was granted Bulgarian citizenship. In 1899, he was elected to the Varna City Council, where he took care of the affairs of this city. On his initiative, the city's beach and embankment were arranged. In 1902, he was elected a full member of the Bulgarian Academy of Sciences.

In 1912 , during the First Balkan War, pilot Mazurkevich served as a volunteer in the Bulgarian aviation.

=== Relations 1918–1940 ===
Diplomatic relations were established on 3 November 1924.

In 1936, Lithuanian traveler and anthropologist Antanas Poška visited Bulgaria for eight months. While traveling, he not only became interested in the traditions and nature of this country, but also collected memoirs and historical material about the life and work of Jonas Basanavičius in Bulgaria, visited the places where he lived, and met with people who knew him or at least remembered him from stories.

=== Relations during the occupation of Lithuania ===
After World War II, both Lithuania and Bulgaria became one-party socialist republics completely subordinate to Moscow. The People's Republic of Bulgaria was established in 1946. Unlike Lithuania, Bulgaria did not become a Soviet republic, which limited bilateral relations between the two communist regimes and societies compared to other Soviet republics.

The pro-Soviet government of the People's Republic of Bulgaria officially recognized the USSR's declared position on the voluntary accession of the Baltic states, including Lithuania, to the Soviet Union. In 1958 , the USSR and Bulgaria concluded bilateral protocols aimed at "completely and finally settling the property and financial issues related to the accession of the Republics of Lithuania, Latvia and Estonia to the Soviet Union."

=== Relations after 1990 ===
The countries held their first democratic elections in more than half a century in the same year – in 1990. After Lithuania regained its independence, Bulgaria was home to mostly Lithuanians who had formed mixed families. At the beginning of the 21st century, the number of people who purchased residential property and settled in the coastal and mountainous regions of Bulgaria increased.

Diplomatic relations were re-established on 10 September 1991.

Since the restoration of diplomatic relations, the following bilateral agreements have been signed between the countries: Agreement on International Carriage of Passengers and Cargo by Road (signed in 1995, ratified in 2002), Agreement on Trade-Economic and Scientific-Technical Cooperation (1996), Agreement on the Procedure for Visa-Free Travel (1996), Agreement on Cooperation in the Fields of Education, Science, Studies and Culture (1996), Agreement on the Framework for Friendly Relations and Cooperation (signed in 1996, ratified in 1997), Agreement on the Conditions and Procedure for the Transit of the Armed Forces of the Republic of Lithuania Participating in the Multinational Armed Forces “KFOR” through the Territory of the Republic of Bulgaria (2000), Agreement on the Avoidance of Double Taxation of Income and Capital and the Prevention of Tax Evasion (2006), Agreement on the Mutual Protection of Classified Information (2007), Agreement on Cooperation in the Field of Tourism (2009).

In 2009, Henrikas Daktaras, one of Lithuania's most wanted criminals at the time, was arrested in Bulgaria. The arrest was made with the help of Bulgarian, British, Norwegian, Spanish and Europol officers, as well as the Lithuanian police attaché at Europol.

== High level visits ==
=== High-level visits from Bulgaria to Lithuania ===
- Several high-level meetings have taken place between the countries. Bulgarian President Georgi Parvanov has visited Lithuania twice. During his first visit, on 12–13 June 2003, he met with Lithuanian President Rolandas Paksas, Prime Minister Algirdas Brazauskas, and Speaker of the Seimas Artūras Paulauskas, and toured Vilnius University. The second state visit took place on 16–18 March 2009. During his visit, he met with Lithuanian President Valdas Adamkus, Prime Minister Andrius Kubilius, and Speaker of the Seimas Arūnas Valinskas.
- On 11–12 July 2023, Prime Minister Nikolai Denkov attended the 2023 Vilnius NATO summit.

=== High-level visits from Lithuania to Bulgaria ===
- In turn, Lithuanian presidents have visited Bulgaria at least twice. On 21–22 November 2005, President Valdas Adamkus visited Sofia.
- On 8–9 July 2021, President Gitanas Nausėda travelled to Sofia and participated in the sixth Three Seas Initiative leaders' meeting, meeting separately with Greek President Katerina Sakellaropoulou.

== Resident diplomatic missions ==
- Bulgaria has an embassy in Vilnius.
- Lithuania has an embassy in Sofia.

=== Several visits by ministers and parliament speakers from both countries have also been held: ===
On 16-17 January 2003, Lithuanian Foreign Minister Antanas Valionis visited Bulgaria. On 9 May 2006, Bulgarian Foreign Minister Ivailo Kalfin visited Lithuania. On 10-12 October 2007, a parliamentary delegation headed by the Speaker of the Seimas, Viktors Muntians, visited Bulgaria. On 9-11 June 2008, Lithuanian Foreign Minister Petras Vaitiekūnas visited Bulgaria.

== See also ==
- Foreign relations of Bulgaria
- Foreign relations of Lithuania
