= Israel–Lithuania relations =

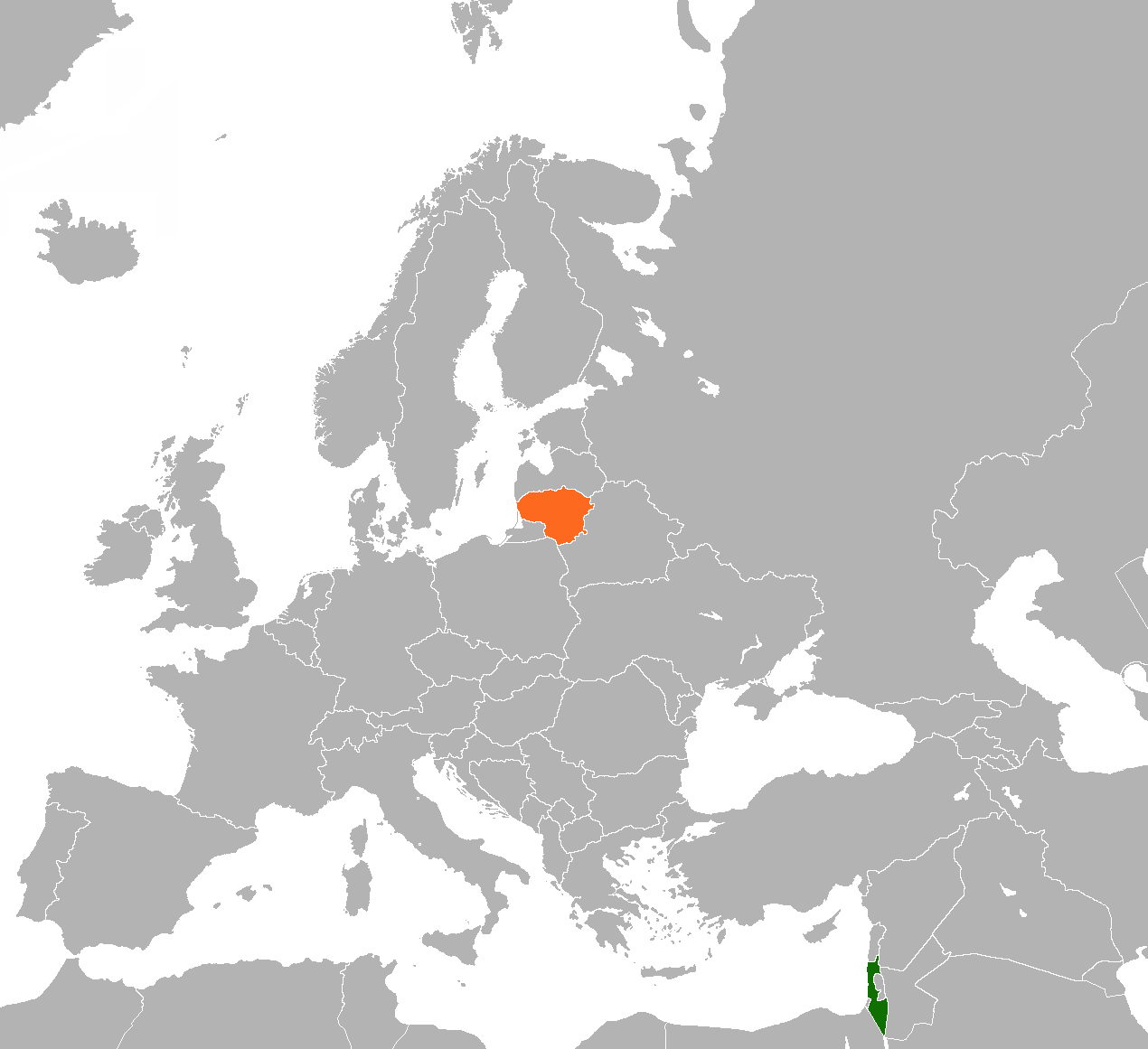

- Israel: Lithuania

Israel–Lithuania relations are foreign relations between Israel and Lithuania. Israel recognized Lithuania's independence in 1991. Both countries established diplomatic relations in 1992. Israel is represented in Lithuania through its embassy in Vilnius which was opened in 2015. Lithuania has an embassy in Tel Aviv.

There are 3,600 Jews living in Lithuania. Both countries are full members of the Union for the Mediterranean.

== History ==
In 2019, the prime minister of Lithuania Saulius Skvernelis considered relocating the Lithuanian embassy to Israel to Jerusalem.

In 2022, Israel gifted the capital city of Lithuania, Vilnius, a paint wall to celebrate 30 years of diplomatic relations.

The Lithuanian parliament condemned October 7 attacks against Israel in 2023 with 108 votes. The Lithuanian society demonstrated their support to Israel many times including ceremonies and demonstrations. The Lithuanian Air Force was sent to Israel multiple times to evacuate Lithuanian citizens.

On 21 November 2024, the International Criminal Court (ICC) issued arrest warrants for two senior Israeli officials, Benjamin Netanyahu, the Prime Minister of Israel, and Yoav Gallant, the former Minister of Defense of Israel, The Foreign Ministry confirmed that the arrest warrant would be executed.

In April 2025, Kestutis Budrys said "Lithuania is monitoring what is being proposed by France and could also recognize a Palestinian state, but only "at the right time".

== Visits ==
Visits of officials
Year	Visit	Note
1994	The Lithuanian prime minister Adolfas Šleževičius visits Israel	The first Lithuanian Prime Minister to visit Israel
1995	The Lithuanian President Algirdas Mykolas Brazauskas visits Israel	The first Lithuanian President to visit Israel
2005	The Lithuanian President Valdas Adamkus visits Israel	
2008	The Lithuanian Minister of Foreign Affairs Petras Vaitiekūnas visits Israel	
2010	The Lithuanian Prime Minister Andrius Kubilius visits Israel	
2012	The Lithuanian Minister of Foreign Affairs Audronius Ažubalis visits Israel	
2013	The Israeli President Shimon Peres visits Lithuania	The first Israeli President to visit Lithuania
2014	The Israeli Minister of Foreign Affairs Avigdor Liberman visits Lithuania	
2015	Lithuanian Prime Minister Algirdas Butkevičius visits Israel	
2015	Lithuanian President Dalia Grybauskaitė visits Israel	
2017	Lithuanian Minister of Foreign Affairs Linas Linkevičius visits Israel	
2018	The Israeli Prime Minister Benjamin Netanyahu visits Lithuania	The first Israeli Prime Minister to visit Lithuania
2018	Lithuanian Speaker of the Seimas Viktoras Pranckietis visits Israel	
2019	Lithuanian Prime Minister Saulius Skvernelis visits Israel	
2020	Lithuanian Speaker of the Seimas Viktoras Pranckietis visits Israel	
2022	Lithuanian Speaker of the Seimas Viktorija Čmilytė-Nielsen visits Israel	
2023	Lithuanian Minister of Foreign Affairs Gabrielius Landsbergis visits Israel	
2023	Lithuanian Prime Minister Ingrida Šimonytė visits Israel	
TBA	The Israeli President Isaac Herzog visits Lithuania	Postponed

== Trade ==
Israel and Lithuania trade is also influenced by the EU - Israel Free Trade Agreement from 1995.

Israel - Lithuania trade in millions USD-$
	Israel imports Lithuania exports	Lithuania imports Israel exports	Total trade value
2023	126.9	56.4	183.3
2022	109	38.2	147.2
2021	102.3	37.1	139.4
2020	81.8	39.7	121.5
2019	68.9	36.3	105.2
2018	61.1	38.3	99.4
2017	44.6	39.3	83.9
2016	38.5	32.1	70.6
2015	32.9	31.6	64.5
2014	23.4	51.7	75.1
2013	26.9	43.5	70.4
2012	35.1	46.1	81.2
2011	33.3	38.9	72.2
2010	22.1	30.7	52.8
2009	13.7	19.8	33.5
2008	24.5	42.4	66.9
2007	21.8	26.2	48
2006	15.1	19	34.1
2005	9.6	14.1	23.7
2004	3.1	9	12.1
2003	3.8	4.5	8.3
2002	3.2	5	8.2

== Tourism ==
Since 2001 Israel and Lithuania abolished the need for visa to travel.

Lithuania puts efforts to market the tourism for the Israeli visitors as the number of tourists from Israel increase. After the massacre of 7 October in 2023, Lithuania was shown by many Israeli media outlets as friendly, non-antisemitic, safe, green, interesting, and great cool escape from the summer.

Tourism from Lithuania in Israel and tourists from Israel in Lithuania
	2023	2022	2021	2020	2019	2018	2017
Tourists from Lithuania Arriving to Israel	12,400	6,900	800	7,900	23,300	19,200	17,900
Tourists from Israel Arriving to Lithuania	27,790	24,895	6,848	2,847	30,205	26,023	20,400

== Resident diplomatic missions ==
- Israel has an embassy in Vilnius.
- Lithuania has an embassy in Tel Aviv.

== See also ==
- Foreign relations of Israel
- Foreign relations of Lithuania
- Lithuanian Jews
- History of the Jews in Lithuania
