= Foreign relations of Lithuania =

Lithuania is a European country located on the south-eastern shore of the Baltic Sea. It is a member of the United Nations, the Organisation for Security and Cooperation in Europe, the European Union, the North Atlantic Treaty Organisation and the World Trade Organisation. Currently, Lithuania maintains diplomatic relations with 186 states. It became a member of the United Nations on 18 September 1991, and is a signatory to a number of its organizations and other international agreements. It is also a member of the Organization for Security and Cooperation in Europe, NATO and its adjunct North Atlantic Coordinating Council, the Council of Europe, and the European Union. Lithuania gained membership in the World Trade Organization on 31 May 2001.

== Lithuania's membership in the EU ==

On 1 May 2004, Lithuania became one of the 27 member states of the European Union. The EU activities affect different spheres of politics, from consumer rights to national defence matters. In the second half of 2013, Lithuania took presidency over the EU Council. Membership in the Union has strengthened the domestic economy, giving it access to the wide pan-European market. Foreign direct investments in Lithuania are growing. The country is poised to become energy-independent. The accession to the Schengen space in 2007 has opened up possibilities for the free movement of both citizens and goods across 25 European states. Lithuania's citizens enjoy equal social guarantees while working, travelling, or studying at the Community's countries. The country now benefits from additional EU fund and programme funding in the field of education and science. As an EU citizen, every citizen of Lithuania has the guarantee of consular assistance of EU representative offices in countries where Lithuania has none.

== Lithuania's membership in NATO ==

On 29 March 2004, Lithuania became a member of the North Atlantic Treaty Organisation It is a defensive union based on political and military cooperation of sovereign states. Its members are committed to protecting freedom, guarding shared heritage and civilisation under the principles of democracy, individual freedom, and superiority of law. According to Article 5 of the agreement, all NATO states are obliged to defend one another. Lithuania entered into cooperation with NATO in 1991. Five years later, Lithuania launched its mission to the organisation, and in late 2002, Lithuania and six other states was invited to start negotiations over membership in the Alliance. Today Lithuania sees NATO as the key and most effective collective defence system, one that ensures the security of the state and stands to defer potential aggression, and employs every measure available to strengthen trans-Atlantic relations to contribute to the strengthening of the EU-U.S. relations.

== Lithuania as a part of the Northern Europe region ==
Lithuania is also an active member in the cooperation between Northern Europe countries. Lithuania is a member of the interparliamentary Baltic Assembly, the intergovernmental Baltic Council of Ministers and the Council of the Baltic Sea States.

Lithuania also cooperates with Nordic and other two Baltic countries through Nordic-Baltic Eight cooperation format. The similar format, called NB6 unites Nordic and Baltic countries members of EU. The main goal of NB6 cooperation is to discuss and agree on positions before presenting them in the Council of the European Union and the meetings of the EU Foreign Affairs Ministers.

The Council of the Baltic Sea States (CBSS) was established in 1992 in Copenhagen as an informal regional political forum, which main aim is to promote integration process and to affiliate close contacts between the countries of the region. The members of CBSS are Denmark, Estonia, Finland, Germany, Iceland, Latvia, Lithuania, Norway, Poland, Sweden and European Commission. The observer states are Belarus, France, Italy, Netherlands, Romania, Slovakia, Spain, United States, United Kingdom, Ukraine.

The cooperation between the Nordic Council of Ministers and Lithuania is a political cooperation through which experience exchange contributes to realization of joint goals. One of its most important functions is to discover new trends and new possibilities for joint cooperation. The information office aims to represent Nordic concepts and demonstrate Nordic cooperation in Lithuania.

Lithuania, together with other two Baltic countries, is also a member of Nordic Investment Bank (NIB) and cooperates in NORDPLUS programme committed to education.

Baltic Development Forum (BDF) is an independent nonprofit organization which unites large companies, cities, business associations and institutions in the Baltic Sea region. In 2010 the 12th Summit of the BDF was held in Vilnius.

Since 2014, Lithuania participates in the British-led Joint Expeditionary Force, a multi-national military partnership.

== Diplomatic relations ==
List of countries which Lithuania maintains diplomatic relations with:

| # | Country | Date |
|---|---|---|
| 1 | Denmark | 24 August 1991 |
| 2 | Iceland | 26 August 1991 |
| 3 | Norway | 27 August 1991 |
| 4 | Austria | 28 August 1991 |
| 5 | Germany | 28 August 1991 |
| 6 | Sweden | 28 August 1991 |
| 7 | Finland | 29 August 1991 |
| 8 | France | 29 August 1991 |
| 9 | Italy | 30 August 1991 |
| 10 | Canada | 2 September 1991 |
| 11 | Hungary | 2 September 1991 |
| 12 | Ireland | 2 September 1991 |
| 13 | Turkey | 3 September 1991 |
| 14 | United Kingdom | 4 September 1991 |
| 15 | Belgium | 5 September 1991 |
| 16 | Poland | 5 September 1991 |
| 17 | Switzerland | 5 September 1991 |
| 18 | United States | 6 September 1991 |
| 19 | Czech Republic | 9 September 1991 |
| 20 | Bulgaria | 10 September 1991 |
| 21 | Romania | 13 September 1991 |
| 22 | China | 14 September 1991 |
| 23 | Mauritania | 18 September 1991 |
| 24 | Argentina | 25 September 1991 |
| 25 | North Korea | 25 September 1991 |
| – | Holy See | 30 September 1991 |
| 26 | Portugal | 4 October 1991 |
| 27 | Estonia | 5 October 1991 |
| 28 | Latvia | 5 October 1991 |
| 29 | Spain | 7 October 1991 |
| 30 | Russia | 9 October 1991 |
| 31 | Japan | 10 October 1991 |
| 32 | South Korea | 14 October 1991 |
| 33 | Brazil | 5 November 1991 |
| 34 | Mexico | 5 November 1991 |
| 35 | Australia | 6 November 1991 |
| 36 | South Africa | 20 November 1991 |
| 37 | Armenia | 21 November 1991 |
| 38 | Slovenia | 22 November 1991 |
| 39 | Netherlands | 3 December 1991 |
| 40 | Chile | 5 December 1991 |
| 41 | Mongolia | 11 December 1991 |
| 42 | Ukraine | 12 December 1991 |
| 43 | Philippines | 15 December 1991 |
| 44 | Greece | 7 January 1992 |
| 45 | Israel | 8 January 1992 |
| 46 | New Zealand | 10 January 1992 |
| 47 | Egypt | 22 January 1992 |
| 48 | Venezuela | 10 February 1992 |
| 49 | Croatia | 18 March 1992 |
| 50 | Vietnam | 18 March 1992 |
| 51 | Albania | 27 April 1992 |
| 52 | India | 27 April 1992 |
| 53 | Guinea | 27 April 1992 |
| 54 | Senegal | 4 May 1992 |
| 55 | Morocco | 7 May 1992 |
| 56 | Costa Rica | 17 May 1992 |
| 57 | Yemen | 22 May 1992 |
| 58 | Cape Verde | 28 May 1992 |
| 59 | Kazakhstan | 12 June 1992 |
| 60 | Zimbabwe | 18 June 1992 |
| 61 | Tunisia | 30 June 1992 |
| 62 | Luxembourg | 2 July 1992 |
| 63 | Kyrgyzstan | 3 July 1992 |
| 64 | Moldova | 8 July 1992 |
| – | Sovereign Military Order of Malta | 9 July 1992 |
| 65 | Ghana | 10 July 1992 |
| 66 | Turkmenistan | 21 July 1992 |
| 67 | Uzbekistan | 5 August 1992 |
| 68 | Tajikistan | 13 August 1992 |
| 69 | Oman | 22 September 1992 |
| 70 | United Arab Emirates | 16 October 1992 |
| 71 | Ecuador | 20 October 1992 |
| 72 | Bosnia and Herzegovina | 6 November 1992 |
| 73 | Bangladesh | 12 November 1992 |
| 74 | Panama | 19 November 1992 |
| 75 | Qatar | 25 November 1992 |
| 76 | Cyprus | 3 December 1992 |
| 77 | Belarus | 30 December 1992 |
| 78 | Slovakia | 6 January 1993 |
| 79 | Paraguay | 3 March 1993 |
| 80 | Uruguay | 8 March 1993 |
| 81 | Lebanon | 18 March 1993 |
| 82 | Thailand | 9 April 1993 |
| 83 | Burundi | 17 May 1993 |
| 84 | Syria | 25 May 1993 |
| 85 | Seychelles | 1 July 1993 |
| 86 | Indonesia | 15 July 1993 |
| 87 | Colombia | 5 August 1993 |
| 88 | Singapore | 10 October 1993 |
| 89 | Iran | 4 November 1993 |
| 90 | Tanzania | 11 November 1993 |
| 91 | Guatemala | 14 December 1993 |
| 92 | Bolivia | 12 January 1994 |
| 93 | Malta | 7 February 1994 |
| 94 | Gabon | 3 March 1994 |
| 95 | Malaysia | 9 March 1994 |
| 96 | Nicaragua | 23 March 1994 |
| 97 | Mozambique | 30 March 1994 |
| 98 | Kuwait | 5 April 1994 |
| 99 | Algeria | 15 April 1994 |
| 100 | Pakistan | 31 May 1994 |
| 101 | Jordan | 5 July 1994 |
| 102 | Chad | 10 August 1994 |
| 103 | Laos | 1 September 1994 |
| 104 | Georgia | 16 September 1994 |
| 105 | Dominican Republic | 2 May 1995 |
| 106 | Bahrain | 3 July 1995 |
| 107 | North Macedonia | 11 July 1995 |
| 108 | Jamaica | 20 October 1995 |
| 109 | Azerbaijan | 20 November 1995 |
| 110 | Mali | 21 November 1995 |
| 111 | Sri Lanka | 20 August 1996 |
| 112 | Andorra | 13 May 1997 |
| 113 | Peru | 9 June 1997 |
| 114 | Kenya | 28 July 1997 |
| 115 | Ivory Coast | 21 October 1997 |
| 116 | Eritrea | 29 August 1998 |
| 117 | Burkina Faso | 23 September 1998 |
| 118 | Ethiopia | 19 October 1998 |
| 119 | Djibouti | 9 June 1999 |
| 120 | Mauritius | 20 September 1999 |
| 121 | El Salvador | 15 October 1999 |
| 122 | Maldives | 2 December 1999 |
| 123 | Gambia | 17 February 2000 |
| 124 | Lesotho | 20 July 2000 |
| 125 | Serbia | 22 December 2000 |
| 126 | Nigeria | 17 January 2001 |
| 127 | Liechtenstein | 27 March 2001 |
| 128 | Brunei | 27 April 2001 |
| 129 | Zambia | 13 July 2001 |
| 130 | Angola | 4 June 2002 |
| 131 | San Marino | 6 March 2003 |
| 132 | São Tomé and Príncipe | 8 July 2003 |
| 133 | Botswana | 17 February 2004 |
| 134 | Antigua and Barbuda | 23 September 2004 |
| 135 | Belize | 30 December 2004 |
| 136 | Honduras | 26 January 2005 |
| 137 | Nepal | 8 February 2005 |
| 138 | Cambodia | 30 March 2005 |
| 139 | Afghanistan | 31 March 2005 |
| 140 | Bahamas | 11 August 2005 |
| 141 | Benin | 2 September 2005 |
| 142 | Saudi Arabia | 31 October 2005 |
| 143 | Republic of the Congo | 5 December 2005 |
| 144 | Namibia | 22 December 2005 |
| 145 | Iraq | 19 January 2006 |
| 146 | Montenegro | 18 July 2006 |
| 147 | Saint Vincent and the Grenadines | 5 February 2007 |
| 148 | Libya | 11 June 2008 |
| – | Kosovo | 1 September 2008 |
| 149 | Samoa | 19 February 2009 |
| 150 | Barbados | 16 March 2009 |
| 151 | Saint Lucia | 19 March 2009 |
| 152 | Haiti | 4 May 2010 |
| 153 | Monaco | 12 April 2011 |
| 154 | Nauru | 28 June 2011 |
| 155 | Malawi | 18 November 2011 |
| 156 | Guyana | 25 January 2012 |
| 157 | Uganda | 15 March 2012 |
| 158 | Solomon Islands | 20 September 2012 |
| 159 | Saint Kitts and Nevis | 26 September 2012 |
| 160 | Trinidad and Tobago | 26 September 2012 |
| 161 | Suriname | 26 March 2013 |
| 162 | Rwanda | 27 March 2013 |
| 163 | Palau | 25 September 2013 |
| 164 | Cuba | 26 September 2013 |
| 165 | Comoros | 26 September 2013 |
| 166 | Grenada | 26 September 2013 |
| 167 | Timor-Leste | 27 September 2013 |
| 168 | Dominica | 7 October 2013 |
| 169 | Myanmar | 8 October 2013 |
| 170 | Cameroon | 16 October 2013 |
| 171 | Federated States of Micronesia | 4 November 2013 |
| 172 | Kiribati | 15 January 2014 |
| 173 | Fiji | 24 January 2014 |
| 174 | Sierra Leone | 15 April 2014 |
| 175 | Liberia | 23 April 2014 |
| 176 | Niger | 30 May 2014 |
| 177 | Togo | 22 September 2014 |
| 178 | Vanuatu | 28 September 2015 |
| 179 | Sudan | 21 June 2017 |
| 180 | Madagascar | 19 September 2017 |
| 181 | Somalia | 30 September 2017 |
| 182 | Tuvalu | 7 June 2018 |
| 183 | Central African Republic | 25 September 2018 |
| 184 | Marshall Islands | 24 September 2019 |
| 185 | Eswatini | 1 April 2021 |
| 186 | Guinea-Bissau | 21 September 2021 |
| 187 | Tonga | 23 September 2024 |
| 188 | Democratic Republic of the Congo | 24 September 2026 |

== Multilateral ==
| Organization | Formal Relations Began | Notes |
|---|---|---|
| European Union | | See 2004 enlargement of the European Union Lithuania joined the European Union as a full member on 1 May 2004. |
| NATO | | Lithuania joined NATO as a full member on 29 March 2004. |

== Africa ==
| Country | Formal relations (re)established | Notes |
|---|---|---|
| Algeria | | See Algeria–Lithuania relations |
| Gambia | 17 February 2000 | See Gambia–Lithuania relations Both countries established diplomatic relations on 17 February 2000. |
| Libya | 11 June 2008 | See Libya–Lithuania relations |
| South Africa | | See Lithuania–South Africa relations |
| Tunisia | | See Lithuania–Tunisia relations |

== America ==
| Country | Formal relations (re)established | Notes |
|---|---|---|
| Antigua and Barbuda | 23 September 2004 | Both countries established diplomatic relations on September 23, 2004. |
| Argentina | 1991 | Argentina is accredited to Lithuania from its embassy in Warsaw, Poland.; Lithuania is accredited to Argentina from its embassy in Madrid, Spain and maintains honorary consulates in Buenos Aires and in Santa Fe. |
| Brazil | 1991 | See Brazil–Lithuania relations: Brazil is accredited to Lithuania from its embassy in Copenhagen, Denmark and maintains an honorary consulate in Vilnius.; Lithuania maintains a consulate-general in São Paulo. |
| Canada | 2 September 1991 | See Canada–Lithuania relations: Canada has an embassy office in Vilnius.; Lithuania has an embassy in Ottawa. |
| Mexico | 5 November 1991 | See Lithuania–Mexico relations Honorary Consulate of Lithuania in Mexico City Lithuania and Mexico initially established diplomatic relations on 31 May 1938 and signed a Treaty of Friendship in Washington, D.C., United States. Mexico never recognized the annexation of Lithuania by the Soviet Union and condemned the action. On 5 November 1991, Mexico recognized and re-established diplomatic relations with Lithuania. In 2002, President Valdas Adamkus paid a visit to Mexico and met with Mexican President Vicente Fox. In 2008, President Adamkus returned to Mexico for a visit and met with Mexican President Felipe Calderón.: Lithuania is accredited to Mexico from its embassy in Washington, D.C., United States and maintains an honorary consulate in Mexico City.; Mexico is accredited to Lithuania from its embassy in Stockholm, Sweden and maintains an honorary consulate in Vilnius. |
| Peru | 9 June 1997 | Honorary Consulate of Lithuania in Lima: Lithuania maintains honorary consulates in Lima.; Peru is accredited to Lithuania from its embassy in Helsinki, Finland. |
| United States | 28 July 1992 | See Lithuania–United States relations Joe Biden and Gitanas Nausėda during 2023 Vilnius Summit Valdas Adamkus and George W. Bush in Vilnius in 2002. Lithuania and the United States first entered into diplomatic relations on 28 July 1992, thanks to enormous efforts from governmental officials of Lithuania and members of the Lithuanian community in the U.S. During the entire period when Lithuania was occupied, the U.S. pursued a policy of non-recognition of the occupation. After independence was restored, on 6 September 1991 the two countries resumed their cross-border relations. U.S. governmental and non-governmental organisations have lent a lot of assistance to strengthen the public and governmental institutions and market economy of the fledgling democracy. On 2 October 1992, the U.S. embassy was launched in Vilnius. On 22 November 2002, U.S. President George W. Bush paid the first official visit to Lithuania. On 8 May 2003, the United States Senate cast a unanimous vote ratifying NATO membership protocols and opening up a door to NATO for Lithuania. Currently, there are 29 bilateral agreements regulating the relationship between Lithuania and the U.S. in various field.: Lithuania has an embassy in Washington, D.C., and consulates-general in Chicago, Los Angeles and New York.; United States has an embassy in Vilnius. |

== Asia ==
| Country | Formal Relations Began | Notes |
|---|---|---|
| Armenia | 21 November 1991 | Armenia is represented in Lithuania through its embassy in Warsaw (Poland).; Lithuania has an embassy in Yerevan.; There are around 2,500 people of Armenian descent living in Lithuania.; Lithuania has recognized the Armenian genocide in 2005.; Lithuanian Ministry of Foreign affairs: list of bilateral treaties with Armenia (in Lithuanian only) |
| Azerbaijan | 1995-11-27 | Azerbaijan recognized the independence of Lithuania on 10 September 1991.; Lithuania recognized the independence of Azerbaijan on 20 December 1991.; Azerbaijan has an embassy in Vilnius.; Lithuania has an embassy in Baku.; Both countries are full members of the Council of Europe and the Organization for Security and Co-operation in Europe (OSCE).; Lithuanian Ministry of Foreign Affairs: Cooperation with Azerbaijan; Foreign Minister of Lithuania to pay official visit to Azerbaijan |
| Bangladesh | 2 November 1992 | Both countries established diplomatic relations on 2 November 1992 |
| China | 14 September 1991 | See China-Lithuania relations The Republic of China established diplomatic relations in 1921. China has a Chargé d'affaires office in Vilnius. Lithuania had an embassy in Beijing. In 1992, the embassy of China was established in Vilnius and in 1995, the embassy of Lithuania was established in Beijing. |
| Georgia | 16 September 1994 | See Georgia–Lithuania relations |
| India | 1992-04-27 | See India–Lithuania relations: India has an honorary consulate in Vilnius.; Lithuania has an embassy in New Delhi and an Honorary Consulate in Mumbai, India. |
| Iran | | See Iran–Lithuania relations: Iran is accredited to Lithuania from its embassy in Warsaw, Poland.; Lithuania is accredited to Iran from its embassy in Ankara, Turkey. |
| Israel | 8 January 1992 | See Israel–Lithuania relations Israel recognized Lithuania's independence in 1992. Both countries established diplomatic relation in 1992. Israel is represented in Lithuania through its embassy in Vilnius (previously through its embassy in Riga, Latvia). Lithuania has an embassy in Tel Aviv and 2 honorary consulates (in Herzliya and Ramat Gan). |
| Japan | 1991 09 06 | See Japan–Lithuania relations Relations between Lithuania and Japan started on 22 December 1922, when Lithuania was recognized by Japan de jure. In 1939 the Consulate of Japan, headed by vice-consul Chiune Sugihara, was opened in Kaunas. It was closed in 1940 when Lithuania was annexed by the Soviet Union. On 6 September 1991, Japan recognized the independence of the Republic of Lithuania from the Soviet Union and on 10 October, Diplomatic relations were restored. In 1997, Embassy of Japan was established in Lithuania, in 1998, Embassy of Lithuania was established in Japan. In 2006 May, Japanese Minister of Foreign Affairs Taro Aso visited Lithuania, and Kirkilas, the Prime Minister of Lithuania, visited Japan just three months later. Bilateral relations were strengthen by the official state visit of Emperor Akihito and Empress Michiko in 2007 May. |
| Kazakhstan | 1992-06-12 | Kazakhstan has an embassy in Vilnius.; Lithuania has an embassy in Astana and an honorary consulate in Almaty.; Lithuanian Ministry of Foreign Affairs: list of bilateral treaties with Kazakhstan (in Lithuanian only) |
| Kyrgyzstan | 3 July 1992 | Both countries established diplomatic relations on 3 July 1992.; Both countries are full members of the Organization for Security and Co-operation in Europe. |
| Malaysia | 9 March 1994 | See Lithuania–Malaysia relations Lithuania has an honorary consulate in Kuala Lumpur, while Malaysia embassy in Stockholm were also accredited to Lithuania. |
| Palestine | | See Lithuania–Palestine relations |
| South Korea | 1991-10-14 | The establishment of diplomatic relations between the South Korea and Lithuania began in October 1991.; Bilateral Trade in 2014; Exports US$216,000,000; Imports US$50,000,000; Bilateral Trade in 2014; South Korea's Investment in Lithuania US$3,340,000; Lithuania's Investment in South Korea US$145,000; According to the Ministry of Foreign Affairs and Trade there are as few as 41 South Koreans living in Lithuania.; Lithuanian Ministry of Foreign Affairs: Cooperation with South Korea; South Korean Ministry of Foreign Affairs and Trade about relations with Lithuania (in Korean only) |
| Tajikistan | 1992 | Both countries established diplomatic relations on 13 August 1992.; Both countries are full members of the Organization for Security and Co-operation in Europe. |
| Turkey | | See Lithuania–Turkey relations: Lithuania has an embassy in Ankara.; Turkey has an embassy in Vilnius.; Both countries are full members of NATO.; Lithuania is an EU member and Turkey is an EU candidate. Lithuania supports Turkey's accession negotiations to the EU, although negotiations have now been suspended. |
| Vietnam | | See Lithuania–Vietnam relations |

== Europe ==
| Country | Formal relations (re)established | Notes |
|---|---|---|
| Albania | 27 April 1992 | See Albania–Lithuania relations |
| Austria | 28 August 1991 | Austria is accredited to Lithuania from its Ministry of Foreign Affairs in Vienna and maintains an honorary consulate in Vilnius.; Lithuania has an embassy in Vienna.; Both countries are full members of the European Union.; Lithuanian Ministry of Foreign affairs: list of bilateral treaties with Austria (in Lithuanian only) |
| Belarus | 30 December 1992 | See Belarus–Lithuania relations Lithuania entered into an international relationship with Belarus in 1991, when, on 20 December, the Supreme Council of Lithuania recognised the independence of the Republic of Belarus, with Belarus recognising the independence of Lithuania a week later, on 27 December. On 30 December 1992, an agreement to enter into diplomatic relations was made in Minsk. In 1995, the presidents of the two countries, Algirdas Brazauskas and Alexander Lukashenko signed an agreement on Good Neighbourhood and Cooperation. Top-ranking governmental officials have exchanged visits. Since 2007, the heads of the governments of the two states have been meeting on regular basis. Belarus is an important economic partner to Lithuania, yet Lithuania supports the stance of the EU and other international organisations on this state. Recently, the nuclear power plant under construction in Astravyets, Belarus, which is considered by Lithuania unsafe, has been escalating tensions. On top of that, Belarus's growing energy, economic, and military dependence on Russia is forcing Lithuania to exercise caution in measuring the political decisions of the country. Currently, there are 27 bilateral agreements regulating the relationship between Lithuania and Belarus in different areas.: Belarus has an embassy in Vilnius.; Lithuania has an embassy in Minsk and a general consulate in Hrodna.; Both countries share 680 km of common border. |
| Bulgaria | 10 September 1991 | See Bulgaria–Lithuania relations: Bulgaria has an embassy in Vilnius.; Lithuania has an embassy in Sofia.; Lithuanian Ministry of Foreign affairs: list of bilateral treaties with Bulgaria (in Lithuanian only); Lithuanian Ministry of Foreign affairs; Both countries are full members of the European Union and NATO. |
| Croatia | 18 March 1992 | See Croatia–Lithuania relations |
| Denmark | 26 September 1991 | See Denmark–Lithuania relations After Lithuania regained its independence in 1990, Denmark's government approved of and lent its assistance to the establishment of the Baltic Information Bureau in Copenhagen in the fall of 1990, to become the first Baltic institution of the kind in Western Europe. On 28 February 1991, the Danish and the Lithuanian foreign ministers inked a mutual protocol, undertaking to reconstruct diplomatic relations whenever possible. The Lithuanian–Denmark diplomatic relations were restored on 26 September 1991. On the initiative of Uffe Ellemann-Jensen, then the Danish foreign minister, an active policy on the Baltics was established and followed until our country joined NATO and the EU. Denmark's tremendous assistance to Lithuania was instrumental to the achievement of our NATO and EU ambitions and the huge inflow of Danish investments in Lithuania. Today, the two countries are cooperating very closely in the fields of defence and economy.: Denmark has an embassy in Vilnius.; Lithuania has an embassy in Copenhagen.; Both countries are full members of the European Union and NATO. |
| Estonia | 16 June 1991 | See Estonia–Lithuania relations: Estonia has an embassy in Vilnius.; Lithuania has an embassy in Tallinn.; Both countries are full members of the European Union and NATO. |
| Finland | 28 August 1991 | See Finland–Lithuania relations Lithuanian President Gitanas Nausėda met with Finnish Prime Minister Petteri Orpo in Helsinki, 2 September 2025 Finland recognised Lithuania's independence on 28 August 1991, and the two countries started diplomatic relations the very same day. Finland is a key partner and neighbour to Lithuania, with the countries pursuing active cooperation in the fields of economy, energy, regional, information security, to name a few. Currently, there are 11 bilateral agreements regulating the relationship between Lithuania and Finland different fields.: Finland has an embassy in Vilnius.; Lithuania has an embassy in Helsinki.; Both countries are members of the European Union and NATO. |
| France | 29 August 1991 | See France–Lithuania relations The first contacts between Lithuania and France were established back in the fall of 1918, and the 1919 Versailles peace conference featured a Lithuanian delegation under Oskaras Milašius. France pronounced de jure recognition of Lithuania on 20 December 1922, becoming a key political partner to the state of Lithuania of the period. During the times of Soviet occupation, Lithuania did not have an official mission to France, even though individual persons were allowed to act in an emissary capacity. The diplomatic relations were resumed on 29 August 1991.: France has an embassy in Vilnius.; Lithuania has an embassy in Paris.; Both countries are full members of the European Union and NATO. |
| Germany | 27 August 1991 | See Germany–Lithuania relations Germany was the first state to de jure recognise Lithuania's statehood on 23 March 1918. Even though Lithuania had been trying to build close ties with this country before the Second World War, on 23 March 1939 Germany made an ultimatum and took over the region of Klaipėda. With the Second World War raging on, in summer 1941, Germany pushed the invading Soviet regime out of Lithuania and occupied the country until early 1945. During the period, in 1942, Germany established a self-government reporting to the German authorities. In the wake of the failed coup and the factual collapse of the Soviet Union in August 1991, on 27 August 1991, the Federal Republic of Germany recognised the independence of the Republic of Lithuania and entered into diplomatic relation s with the country on 28 August. On 28 November 1991, Germany supported Lithuania's membership in the EU and NATO. On the basis of the decisions made at the 2016 NATO Summit in Warsaw, as of February 2017, Lithuania hosts a NATO enhanced forward presence battlegroup under German command. Currently, there are 21 bilateral agreements regulating the historically finest relationship between Lithuania and Germany. |
| Greece | 7 February 1992 | See Greece–Lithuania relations |
| Holy See | 30 September 1991 | The first Pope to de jure recognise Lithuania in 1922 was Pius XI, with Kazys Bizauskas dispatched to represent Lithuania in the Vatican. In 1926, Kaunas ecclesiastical province was established, and a concord with the Holy See was signed in 1927. The latter had never recognised Lithuania's incorporation into the Soviet Union. Lithuania had its embassies to the Holy See in Rome. Full-fledged diplomatic relations were resumed on 30 September 1991 with a bilateral declaration signed in Vilnius. On 11 July 1992, Kazys Lozoraitis became Lithuania's first ambassador to the Holy See. Currently, there are 4 bilateral agreements regulating the relationship between Lithuania and the Holy See in different fields. |
| Iceland | 26 August 1991 | See Iceland–Lithuania relations: Iceland was the first country which recognised Lithuania's Independence from the Soviet Union on 11 January 1991. |
| Italy | | Italy has an embassy in Vilnius.; Lithuania has an embassy in Rome.; Both countries are full members of the European Union and NATO. |
| Kosovo | 16 July 2008 | See Kosovo–Lithuania relations: Lithuania recognized Kosovo on 6 May 2008. Diplomatic relations commenced on 16 July 2008. |
| Latvia | 12 February 1921 | See Latvia–Lithuania relations Lithuanian Speaker Viktoras Pranckietis and Latvian Prime Minister Māris Kučinskis in 2016. The diplomatic relations between Lithuania and Latvia date back to 1919. On 12 February 1921, Latvia de jure recognised Lithuania. Throughout the entire period of independence of the two states between the two world wars, efforts were being made to strengthen cross-border and international cooperation by establishing new unions and partnerships. This did not produce any significant results. After the two countries restored their statehood, their diplomatic relations were resumed on 5 October 1991, when an agreement on the reconstruction of the state border, promotion and protection of investments, air service, and other matters, was made. Today, Latvia ranks second on the list of Lithuania's export partners, and fourth in terms of imports. Currently, the relations between Lithuania and Latvia in different fields are regulated by 23 bilateral agreements. and 22 tripartite agreements, which involve Estonia |
| Malta | 7 February 1994 | Malta is represented in Lithuania through a non-resident ambassador based in Valletta (in the Ministry of Foreign Affairs); and an honorary consulate in Vilnius.; Lithuania is represented in Malta through its embassy in Rome (Italy) and an honorary consulate in Valletta.; Both countries are full members of the European Union.; Lithuanian Ministry of Foreign affairs: list of bilateral treaties with Malta (in Lithuanian only) |
| Moldova | 8 July 1992 | Both countries established diplomatic relations on 8 July 1992.; Both countries are full members of the Organization for Security and Co-operation in Europe. |
| Netherlands | 27 April 1992 | Both countries established diplomatic relations on 27 April 1992.: Lithuania has an embassy in The Hague.; The Netherlands has an embassy in Vilnius.; Both countries are full members of the European Union and NATO. |
| Norway | 27 August 1991 | Norway recognised Lithuania's independence on 24 August 1991. On 27 August, the countries entered into diplomatic relations. Norway is a key partner in the areas of economy, energy security, and defence. Currently, there are 12 bilateral agreements regulating the relationship between Lithuania and Norway in different areas. |
| Poland | 26 August 1991 | See Lithuania–Poland relations Lithuanian President Nausėda and Polish Prime Minister Morawiecki, 2019 Lithuania and Poland have a long history of mutual relations: from a common state to the period when all diplomatic ties were cut. Currently, the Lithuania-Poland relations are excellent. Poland recognised Lithuania's independence on 26 August 1991, and the two countries entered into a diplomatic relationship on 5 August 1991. To promote cross-border relations, an agreement on friendly relations and good neighbourly cooperation between the Republic of Lithuania and the Republic of Poland was signed on 26 April 1994. The agreement regulates the underlying principles that support the cooperation between the countries, waiving any territorial claims, and defines the rights of ethnic minorities. In February 1995, the first official visit of the Lithuania's president to Warsaw took place. To ensure a more efficient cooperation between the countries and to facilitate the implementation of bilateral projects, in 1997, three joint institutions – the Advisory Committee of the presidents of Lithuania and Poland, the Lithuanian-Polish Interparliamentary Assembly, and the Lithuanian-Polish Council of Intergovernmental cooperation – were founded. Bilateral cooperation became very close and intensive with the election of Valdas Adamkus and Aleksander Kwaśniewski presidents of the two countries. Poland was an important ally to Lithuania in the country's bid to attain EU and NATO membership, both presidents acted as mediators during the Orange Revolution in Ukraine, and the countries still agree on foreign political threats and the importance of energy independence. Later, there has been some tension in the relations due to the controversy over the situation with ethnic minorities and the disputes over the spelling of Polish personal and place names and Polish schools in Lithuania. Difficulties in education are a challenge that the Lithuanian minority in Puńsk and Sejny is facing. With the changes that occurred in the geopolitical situation of the region in 2016 and energy and transportation infrastructural projects underway, the relationship between Lithuania and Poland is recovering, Poland is actively involved in ensuring the security of the Baltic region, its troops are continuously participating in NATO military training exercises in Lithuania. |
| Portugal | | Lithuania is accredited to Portugal from its embassy in London, the United Kingdom.; Portugal is accredited to Lithuania from its embassy in Copenhagen, Denmark.; Both countries are full members of the European Union and NATO. |
| Romania | 13 August 1991 | See Lithuania–Romania relations: Romania recognized Lithuania's independence on 26 August 1991.; Diplomatic relations between both countries have been resumed on 13 September 1991.; Lithuania has an embassy in Bucharest.; Romania has an embassy in Vilnius.; Both countries are full members of NATO, the European Union, and the Organization for Security and Co-operation in Europe.; Lithuanian Ministry of Foreign affairs: list of bilateral treaties with Romania (in Lithuanian only) |
| Russia | 9 October 1991 | See Lithuania–Russia relations On 12 July 1920, Lithuania signed a Peace Treaty with the Soviet Russia, whereby Russia recognises the sovereignty and independence of the State of Lithuania without reservations and with all of the resulting legal implications, and in good faith abandoned all of Russia's national and territorial claims for all times.’ On 27 July 1991, Lithuania and Russia signed an agreement On the Grounds of Cross-border Relations. By this agreement, the countries recognised each other a full-fledged subject of international law and a sovereign state. On 9 October, of the same year, representatives of the two states exchanged notes that signified ultimate recognition of the independence and sovereignty of the state of Lithuania. Russia's troops took a little longer to withdraw from Lithuania. The last of the Russian military deployed in Lithuania left the territory of the country on 31 August 1993. Lithuania supports the stance of the EU and other international organisations towards this state and approves the policy of sanctions. The country does not recognise the annexation of part of the Ukrainian territories to the Russian Federation. The country also takes active steps to protect its information space. Currently, there are 39 bilateral agreements regulating the relationship between Lithuania and Russia in different fields. Lithuania has an embassy in Moscow. Russia has an embassy in Vilnius. |
| Serbia | 14 December 2000 | See Lithuania–Serbia relations: Lithuania is represented in Serbia through its embassy in Budapest (Hungary).; Serbia is represented in Lithuania through its embassy in Warsaw (Poland) and the diplomatic office in Belgrade.; Lithuania is an EU member and Serbia is an EU candidate.; Lithuanian Ministry of Foreign Affairs: list of bilateral treaties with Serbia (in Lithuanian only); Serbian Ministry of Foreign Affairs about relations with Lithuania |
| Slovakia | 6 January 1993 | Lithuania is represented in Slovakia through its embassy in Vienna (Austria).; Slovakia is represented in Lithuania through its embassy in Riga (Latvia).; Both countries are full members of NATO and of the European Union.; Lithuanian Ministry of Foreign Affairs: list of bilateral treaties with Slovakia (in Lithuanian only) |
| Spain | 27 August 1991 | See Lithuania–Spain relations Both countries established diplomatic relations on 27 August 1991.: Lithuania has an embassy in Madrid.; Spain has an embassy in Vilnius.; Both countries are full members of the European Union and NATO. |
| Sweden | 28 August 1991 | See Lithuania–Sweden relations Sweden resumed diplomatic relations with Lithuania on 28 August 1991.: Lithuania has an embassy in Stockholm.; Sweden has an embassy in Vilnius.; Both countries are members of the European Union and NATO. |
| Ukraine | 26 August 1991 | See Lithuania–Ukraine relations Gitanas Nausėda meets Volodymyr Zelenskyy during the Russian invasion of Ukraine: Much of the current territory of Ukraine was part of the Polish–Lithuanian Commonwealth prior to the partitions of Poland ending in 1795.; Lithuania has an embassy in Kyiv and an honorary consulates in Lviv.; Ukraine has an embassy in Vilnius and 3 honorary consulates (in Klaipėda, Šalčininkai and Visaginas).; Both countries are full members of the Council of Europe.; Lithuania fully supports Ukraine's membership in the European Union and NATO.; There are around 44,000 ethnic Ukrainians living in Lithuania and around 11,000 ethnic Lithuanians living in Ukraine.; Lithuanian Ministry of Foreign affairs: list of bilateral treaties with Ukraine (in Lithuanian only) |
| United Kingdom | 4 September 1991 | See Lithuania–United Kingdom relations Lithuania established diplomatic relations with the United Kingdom on 4 September 1991.: Lithuania maintains an embassy in London.; The United Kingdom is accredited to Lithuania through its embassy in Vilnius.; Both countries share common membership of the Council of Europe, the European Court of Human Rights, the International Criminal Court, the Joint Expeditionary Force, NATO, the OECD, the OSCE, and the World Trade Organization. Bilaterally the two countries have an Investment Agreement. |

== Oceania ==
| Country | Formal relations (re)established | Notes |
|---|---|---|
| Australia | 22 September 1921/6 November 1991 | See Australia–Lithuania relations: Australia is accredited to Lithuania from its embassy in Warsaw, Poland and maintains an honorary consulate in Vilnius.; Lithuania has an embassy in Canberra. |
| New Zealand | 10 January 1992 | See Lithuania–New Zealand relations: Lithuania is accredited to New Zealand from its embassy in Canberra, Australia and maintains an honorary consulate in Auckland.; New Zealand is accredited to Lithuania from its embassy in Warsaw, Poland and maintains an honorary consulate in Vilnius. |

== Issues ==
=== Illicit drug trafficking ===
Lithuania has been a trans-shipment point for opiates and other illicit drugs from Russia, Southwest Asia, Latin America, and Western Europe to Eastern Europe and Scandinavia.

=== Anti-terrorism ===
Lithuania is a signatory to 8 of the 12 International Conventions related to counter- terrorist activities

=== Human trafficking ===
The International Organization for Migration (IOM) reports that about 1,000 citizens of Lithuania fall victim to trafficking annually. Most are women between the ages of 21 and 30 who are sold into prostitution

== See also ==
- List of diplomatic missions in Lithuania
- List of diplomatic missions of Lithuania
- List of ambassadors to Lithuania
