= Greece–Lithuania relations =

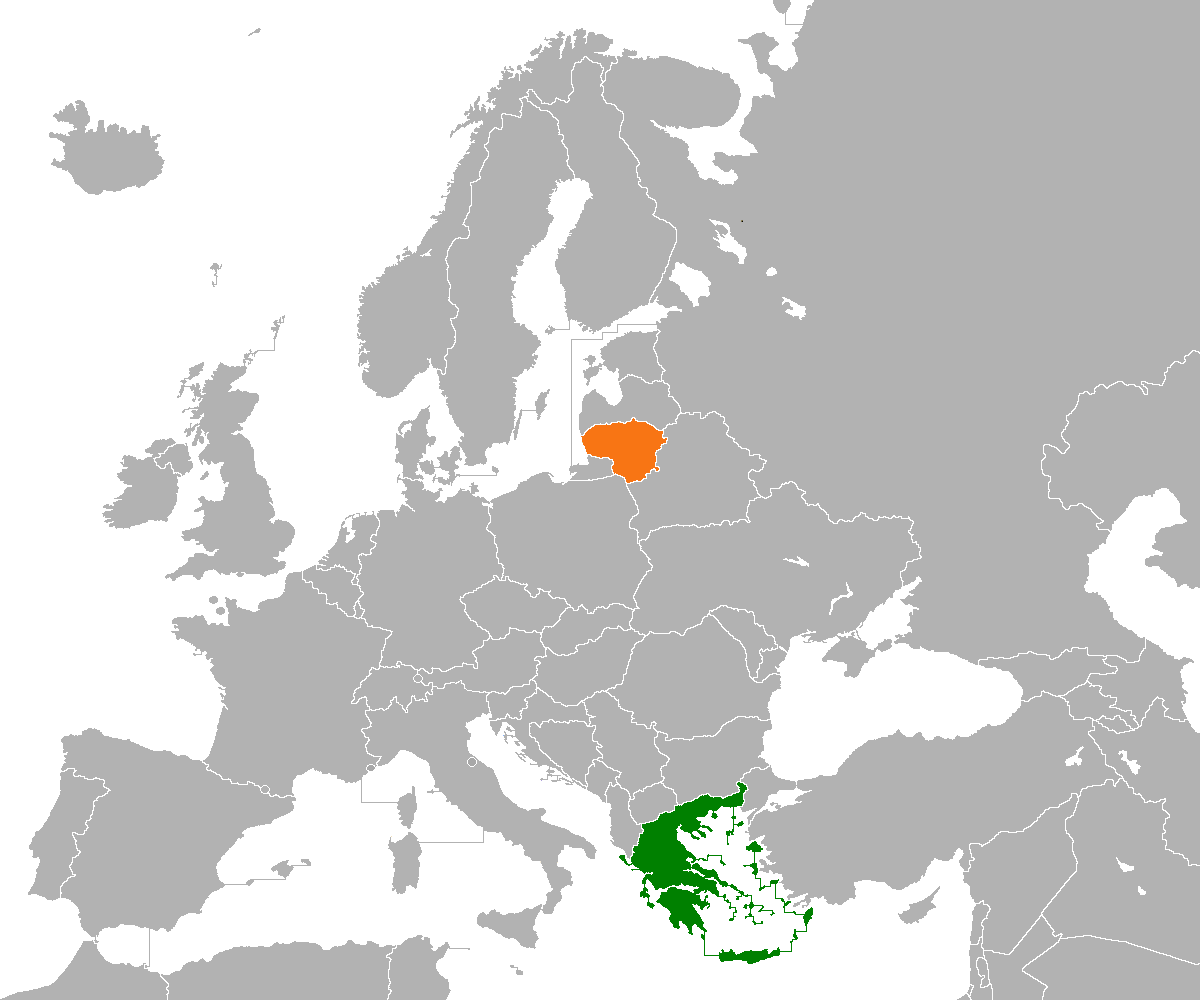

- Greece: Lithuania

Greece–Lithuania relations are the bilateral relations between Greece and Lithuania. Greece has an embassy in Vilnius. Lithuania has an embassy in Athens. Both countries are full members of the Organization for Security and Co-operation in Europe, Council of Europe, European Union and NATO.

== History ==
Greece recognised the State of Lithuania on 23 May 1922, and diplomatic relations between the two countries were restored on 7 January 1992. Greece had never officially recognised the annexation of the Baltic states by the USSR. Lithuania has maintained an embassy in Athens since 1997 along with an honorary consulate in Thessaloniki. Greece has had an embassy in Vilnius since 2 January 2005.

== List of bilateral visits ==
- In February 1997, the President of Lithuania Algirdas Brazauskas visited Greece
- On 2 July 2007, the Lithuanian Ministry of Foreign Affairs Petras Vaitiekūnas visited Athens
- In September 2008, the Prime Minister of Lithuania Gediminas Kirkilas visited Athens

== Bilateral agreements ==
- investment protection,
- culture, tourism, economic, industrial and technological cooperation,
- road and sea transport,
- mutual elimination of visas,
- re-admission of persons,
- protection of confidential information

== the European Union and NATO ==
Greece joined the EU in 1981. Lithuania joined the EU in 2004. Greece joined NATO in 1952. Lithuania joined NATO in 2004.

== Resident diplomatic missions ==
- Greece has an embassy in Vilnius.
- Lithuania has an embassy in Athens.

== See also ==
- Foreign relations of Greece
- Foreign relations of Lithuania
