= Lithuania–Turkey relations =

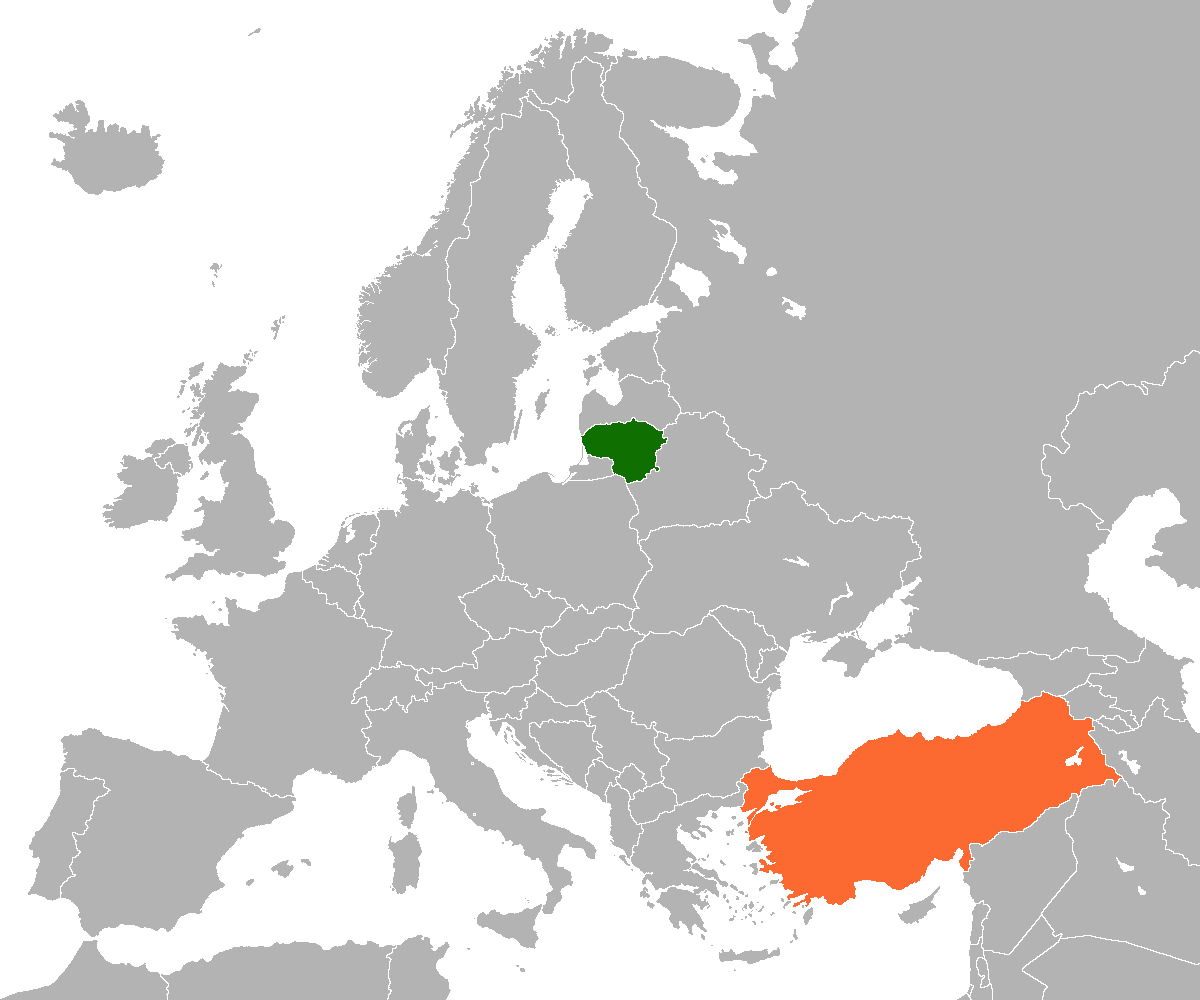

- Lithuania: Turkey

Lithuania–Turkey relations are the foreign relations between Lithuania and Turkey.

== History ==
Turkey recognized Lithuania on July 28, 1922, and diplomatic relations were established on the same day. The Turkish ambassador to Estonia in Tallinn was also accredited to Lithuania. Following USSR occupation and annexation of Estonia, Latvia and Lithuania, the Turkish embassy in Tallinn closed on September 5, 1940. Turkey, however, never recognized the Soviet annexation of Lithuania.

Following the revelation that Gorbachev had authorized the Vilnius Massacre, Turkey renewed recognition of Lithuania's independence and restored diplomatic relations on September 3, 1991.

== Military cooperation ==
Turkey cooperates closely with Lithuania in military affairs and provides personnel to the NATO Center of Excellence in Vilnius. In the past, Turkey trained Lithuanian military units who served as UN peacekeepers in the former Yugoslavia.

== Economic relations ==
- Trade volume between the two countries was US$687 million in 2018 (Turkish exports/imports: 277/410 million USD).

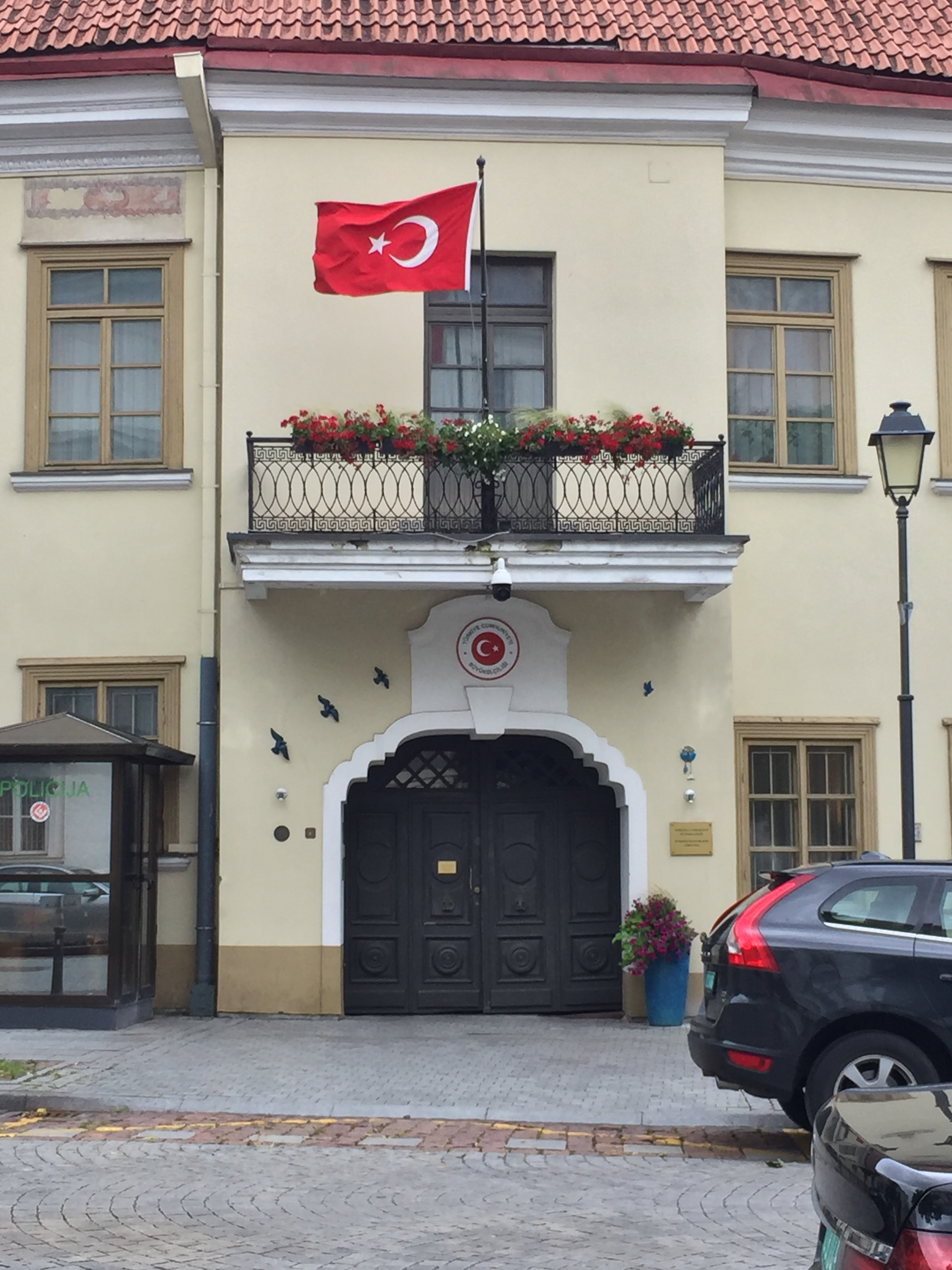
Embassy of Turkey in Vilnius

== Resident diplomatic missions ==
- Lithuania has an embassy in Ankara.
- Turkey has an embassy in Vilnius.

== See also ==
- Foreign relations of Lithuania
- Foreign relations of Turkey
- Turkey–European Union relations
