= Lithuania–Serbia relations =

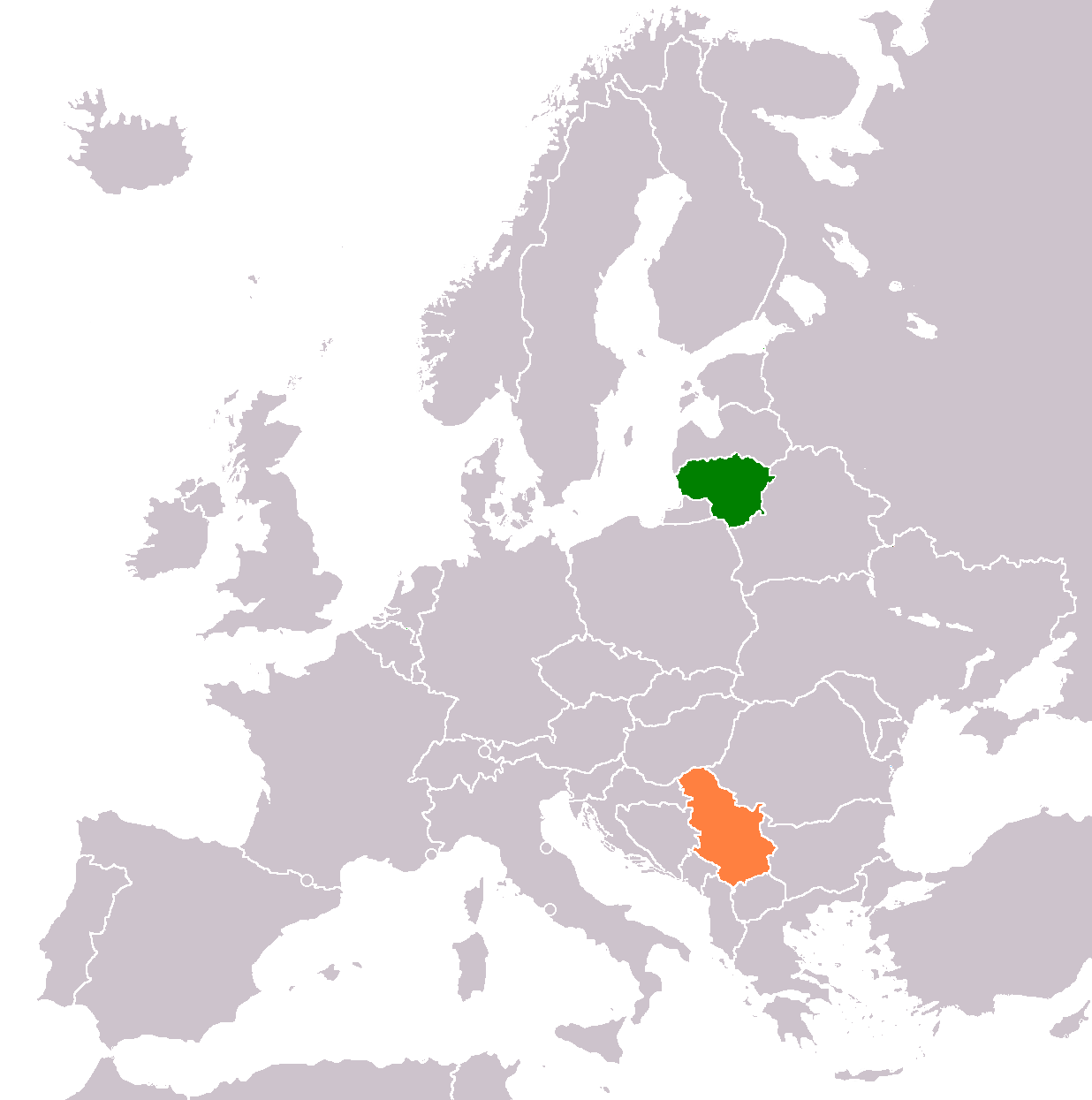

- Lithuania: Serbia

Lithuania and Serbia maintain diplomatic relations established between Lithuania and the Federal Republic of Yugoslavia (of which Serbia is considered sole legal successor) in 2000.

== Economic relations ==
Trade between two countries amounted to nearly $109 million in 2023; Serbian merchandise exports to Lithuania were standing at over $63 million; Lithuania's export to Serbia were about $45 million.

== Resident diplomatic missions ==
- Lithuania is represented in Serbia through its embassy in Budapest, Hungary.
- Serbia is represented in Lithuania through its embassy in Riga, Latvia.

== See also ==
- Foreign relations of Lithuania
- Foreign relations of Serbia
- Soviet Union–Yugoslavia relations
