= Georgia–Lithuania relations =

- Georgia: Lithuania

Diplomatic mission
- Embassy of Georgia, Vilnius: Embassy of Lithuania, Tbilisi

Georgia–Lithuania relations refers to bilateral relations between Georgia and Lithuania. Lithuania is a member of the EU, which Georgia applied for in 2022. Both nations are members of the Council of Europe. Both countries are Post Soviet states as they were Republics of the Soviet Union. Both countries maintain embassies in each other’s capitals.

== History ==
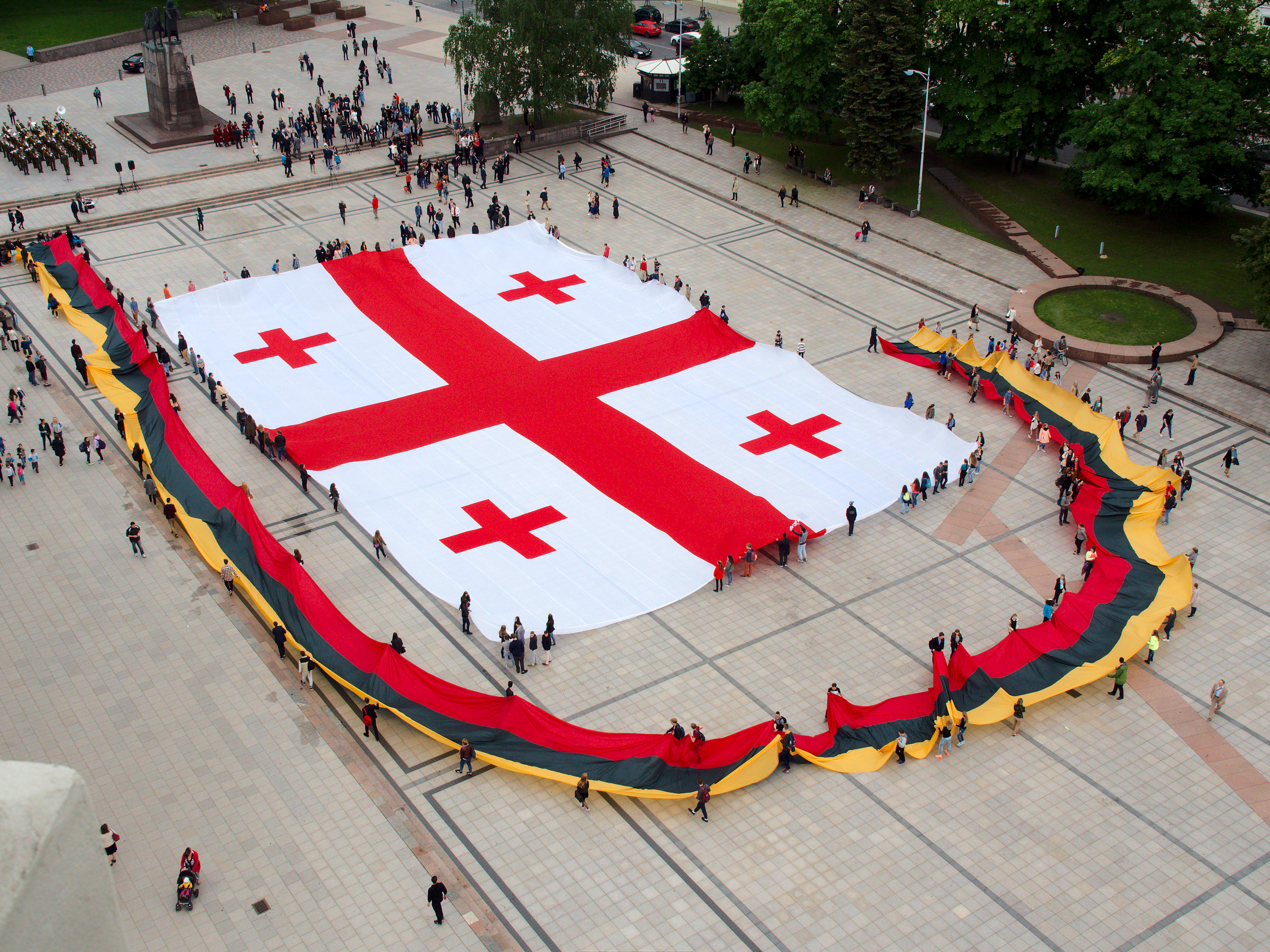
Independence day of Georgia celebrated in Vilnius on 26 May 2015

Diplomatic relations between Georgia and the Republic of Lithuania were established on 16 September 1994.

On 9 August 2018, Lithuania introduced migration restrictions on individuals placed on the Otkhozoria–Tatunashvili List, a list of individuals the Georgian Parliament considers to have 'violated the rights of Georgian citizens in the Georgian occupied regions of Abkhazia and Tskhinvali'.

In December 2020, Lithuanian Foreign Minister Linas Linkevičius called for NATO to cooperate more closely with Georgia and Ukraine and maintain the 'open door' policy.

On 25 February 2021, in response to the detention of Nika Melia, Ministers of Foreign Affairs of Estonia, Latvia, and Lithuania issued a joint statement expressing "serious concerns over the political situation developing in Georgia" and urging "all political forces to act with restraint, de-escalate the situation and seek [a] constructive solution". Lithuanian President Gitanas Nausėda offered to act as a mediator to resolve the situation.

On 1 December 2025, due to crackdowns on pro-EU demonstrators involved in the ongoing Georgian protests over alleged election fraud, Lithuania along with several other EU countries announced sanctions, as well as travel bans on high ranking Georgian officials including Bidzina Ivanishvili leader of the ruling Georgian Dream party.

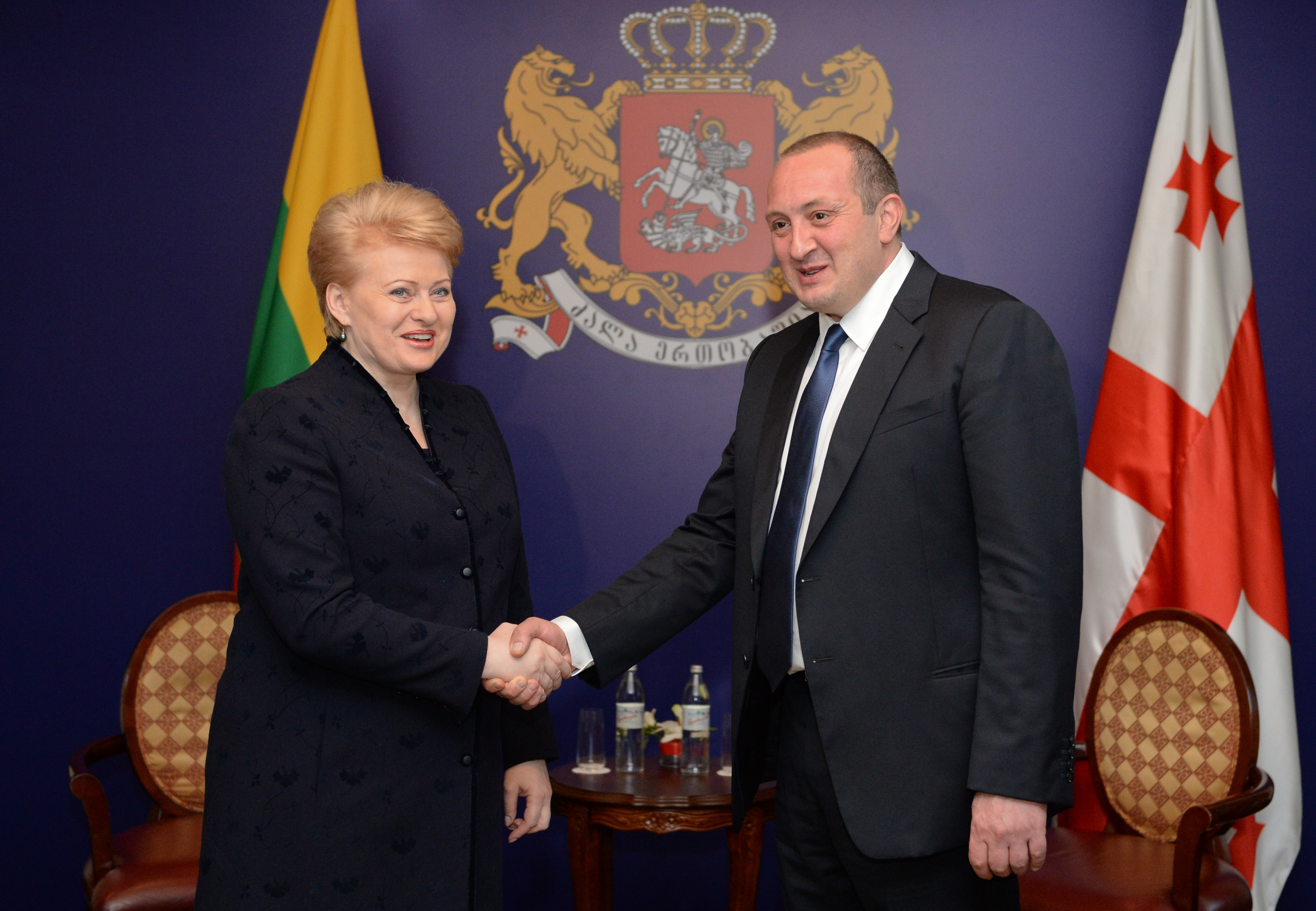
Georgian President Giorgi Margvelashvili meeting the Lithuanian President Dalia Grybauskaitė in November 2013.

== Resident diplomatic missions ==
- Georgia has an embassy in Vilnius.
- Lithuania has an embassy in Tbilisi.

== See also ==
- Foreign relations of Georgia
- Foreign relations of Lithuania
