= Lithuania–Malaysia relations =

- Lithuania: Malaysia

Lithuania–Malaysia relations are the bilateral relations between Lithuania and Malaysia. Lithuania operates diplomatic missions with Malaysia from its embassy in Singapore while Malaysia operates diplomatic missions with Lithuania from its embassy in Stockholm, Sweden.

== History ==
Diplomatic relations between Lithuania and Malaysia were established in 1994, and Malaysia is currently seeking to strength the bilateral relations with Lithuania, especially in economic, trade and investment.

== Economic relations ==
Both countries are seeking to enhance co-operation, especially in investments, transport and logistics, food industry, renewable energy and high technologies, and there are some Lithuanians who have started a business in Malaysia. Lithuania also invited Malaysian oil and gas company to bid for a contract to supply liquefied natural gas for its Klaipėda LNG FSRU terminal in the Port of Klaipėda and other Malaysian companies to expand halal foods in the country. In aviation, the country also eyes air cargo from Malaysia.

== Education relations ==
In education, a memorandum of understanding to develop a partnership between the two country universities has been signed between Mykolas Romeris University and Universiti Malaysia Perlis.

== See also ==
- Foreign relations of Lithuania
- Foreign relations of Malaysia
