= Lithuania–Spain relations =

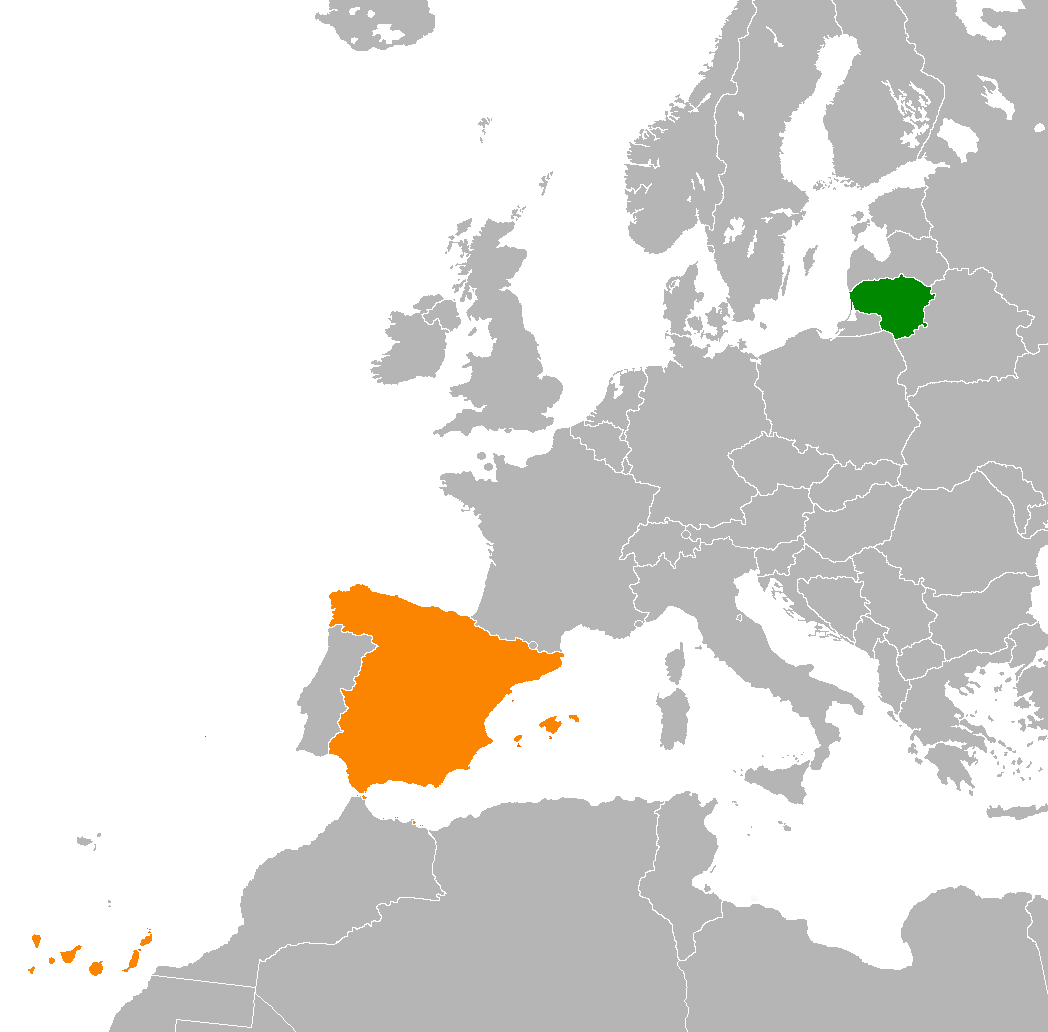

- Lithuania: Spain

Lithuania–Spain relations are the bilateral and diplomatic relations between these two countries. Relationships are mainly defined by the membership of both countries to the European Union and to NATO. Lithuania has an embassy in Madrid. Spain has an embassy in Vilnius since December 2013.

== Diplomatic relations ==
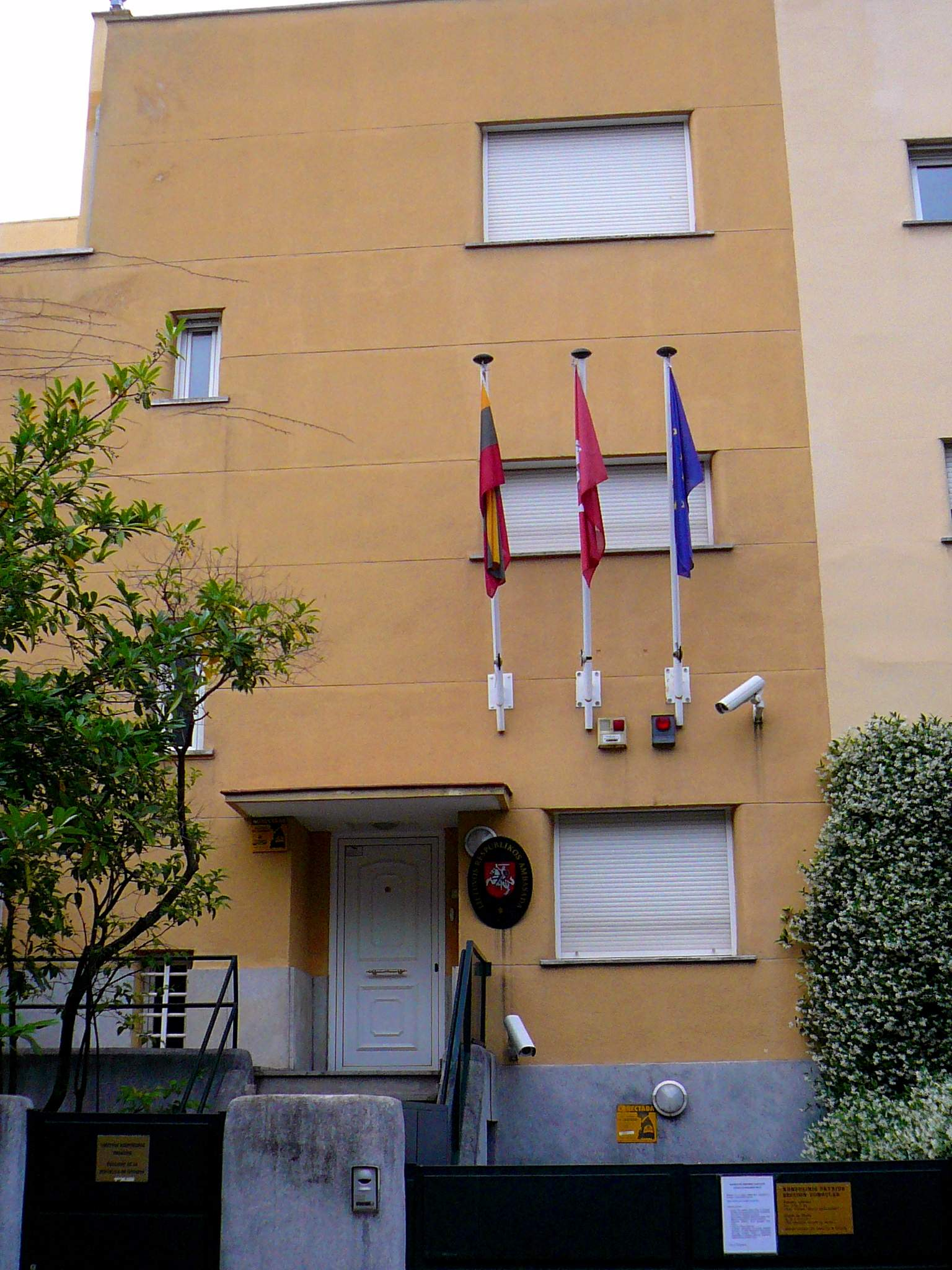
Embassy of Lithuania in Madrid

The dimplomatic relations between Lithuania and Spain were formally established on July 27, 1922. Spain re-established diplomatic relations with Lithuania after its independence restoration on September 7, 1991, and accredited – until the opening of the resident Embassy in 2004 – the Spanish Ambassador in Copenhagen.

Bilateral relations have been traditionally good, but of limited intensity. The entry of Lithuania into NATO on March 29, 2004, and in the European Union on May 1, 2004, together with the opening of a Spanish Embassy in March 2004 (that of Lithuania in Spain opened in 1995), marks the greater intensity of links, such as the increasing immigration of Lithuanians to Spain (estimated at around 20,000).

Lithuania is of growing interest for Spain due to the strengthening of the Nordic and Baltic dimension of the European Union that led to the extension of it in 2004. In this sense, bilateral cooperation between the two has been reinforced by the observer status of Spain in the Baltic Sea Coast States Council (CBSS), since 2009.

Spain and Lithuania share many interests within the European Union, such as the defense of the Principles of Cohesion and Solidarity, the construction of energy infrastructures that prevent the isolation of certain countries, the need for an adequate budget allocation for the Union or the importance it attaches to the control of the external borders of the Union.

Lithuania was the only Baltic country that participated in the Expo Zaragoza in 2008 where this country was represented the pavilion "the House of Rain" visited by the Lithuanian Prime Minister on the day Lithuanian national at the Expo. The interest of this country to be present in international events was already evident with its presence in the Seville Expo in 1992, just one year after regaining its independence.

== Economic relations ==
Bilateral trade relations between Spain and Lithuania are modest although with a tendency to increase Spanish exports. While in 2011 and 2012 the trade balance was deficient for Spain, since 2013 it is surplus for this country. There is also an increase in absolute figures in both directions. Thus, in 2013, Spanish exports to Lithuania increased to 313.8 million Euros and in 2014 (data until November) they had already risen to 333 million Euros.

== Cooperation ==
Spanish cooperation with Lithuania, being a member country of the European Union, has been and is mainly aimed at institutional strengthening and the formation of human capital. In this sense, Spain has participated in 9 Twinning projects of the European Union:

1. Strengthening administrative and technical capacities to promote the free movement of goods (AENOR).
2. Strengthening of the capacity of the Lithuanian administration in the area of Common Fisheries Policy (Ministry of Agriculture, Fisheries and Food).
3. Strengthening the fight against illicit drug demand and reducing supply capacity (Ministry of Interior).
4. Strengthening of the capacities of the Ministry of Agriculture and related institutions to manage and administer the Community acquis in agriculture (PAC) and rural development (MAP). (Project led by Denmark).
5. Improvement of Public Services (Complutense University).
6. Examination and implementation of the National Anti-Corruption Program. Preparation and strategies of the anti-corruption sector and action plans. (Anti-corruption prosecution).
7. Fight against fraud affecting the financial interests of the European Union. Training in research techniques and procedures. (Phare Multicountry Program – led by the CGPJ and the Anti-Corruption Prosecutor's Office).
8. Establishment of the Lithuanian SIRENE office and its necessary infrastructure (Ministry of Interior).
9. Strengthening the capacities of the Ministry of Agriculture and related institutions in the field of fisheries.

The Spanish embassy also organized, in coordination with the Ministry of Foreign Affairs of Lithuania and the Spanish Ministry of Economy and Finance, a seminar on the management of structural and cohesion funds, on November 26, 2004, at the premises of the Embassy, addressed to local, regional and institutional Lithuanian administrations.

The Spanish embassy also coordinated, together with the Lithuanian Ministry of Foreign Affairs and the Ministry of Economy and Finance, the organization of a seminar on structural funds in order to present the Spanish experience in the use of these that was held in March 2007 in Madrid and Toledo, and in which the Lithuanian Central Agency for CPVA projects participated (competent in the execution of the structural funds granted to this country).

NGOs (cooperators and volunteers): several religious volunteers belonging to Opus Dei reside in the country. Several missionary families have also settled in the north of the country.

Cooperation in security, humanitarian and peacekeeping fields: the normative basis is the Cooperation Protocol between the Ministry of Defense of the Kingdom of Spain and the Ministry of National Defense of the Republic of Lithuania, signed in Madrid on October 25, 2001. Within the framework of this cooperation in the field of security, the NATO mission for the protection of the Baltic airspace, which from August 1 to December 1 on 2006, assumed Spanish Air Force from the base of Siauliai. Between January and March 2015 Spain collaborates in this same mission with 4 Eurofighter of the Air Force based on the base of Amarï (Estonia).

== Resident diplomatic missions ==
- Lithuania has an embassy in Madrid.
- Spain has an embassy in Vilnius.

== See also ==
- Foreign relations of Lithuania
- Foreign relations of Spain
