= Iceland–Lithuania relations =

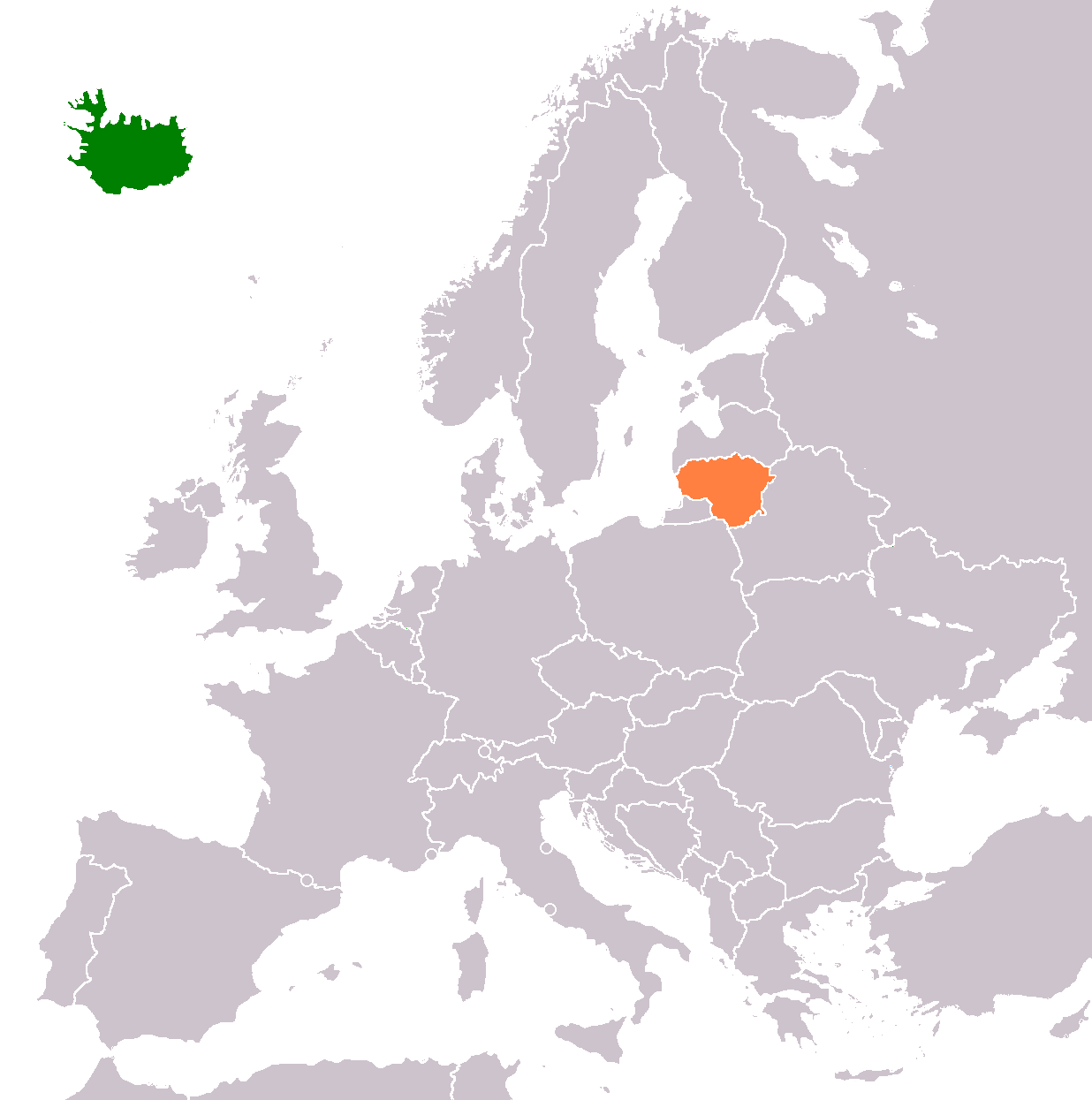

- Iceland: Lithuania

Iceland–Lithuania relations are the bilateral relations between Iceland and Lithuania. Iceland is represented in Lithuania through its embassy in Helsinki (Finland). Lithuania is represented in Iceland through its embassy in Copenhagen (Denmark) and 2 honorary consulates (in Mosfellsbær and Reykjavík).

Both countries are full members of the Council of the Baltic Sea States, Joint Expeditionary Force, NATO, and the Council of Europe. Additionally, they are both part of the Nordic-Baltic Eight.

== History ==
=== 1922–1940 period ===
Little information has survived about relations during the interwar years of the Republic of Lithuania.

=== Relations during the occupations ===
The Soviet occupation severed relations between Lithuania and Iceland, and the latter became fully independent from Denmark in 1944. During the Soviet occupation, Iceland did not recognize the Baltic states as part of the Soviet Union. However, according to Guðni Thorlacius Johannesson, the policy of non-recognition was not followed in trade – Iceland did not boycott the port of Klaipėda, and in 1978 The Icelandic ambassador to Moscow visited the Soviet Baltic republics.

=== Relations between the restored Republic of Lithuania and Iceland (1991-present) ===
The relations between Lithuania and Iceland are very good, given impetus by the fact that Iceland quickly recognized Lithuania's statehood. The then Minister of Foreign Affairs of Iceland, J. B. Hannibalsson, was the only foreign minister of a Western country who was not afraid to come to Vilnius immediately after the events of January 1991 to express solidarity.

Iceland was the first country to recognise the independence of Lithuania in February 1991.

Back in 1993 On 18 March, Lithuanian President Algirdas Brazauskas arrived in Iceland on a state visit. This was his second foreign visit after Denmark, which he visited on 17 March.

In 1994, Arnors Hanibalssonas was appointed Honorary Consul General of Lithuania in Iceland.

2009 The then President of Iceland Olafur Ragnar Grimsson also arrived to congratulate Lithuania on the millennium of its name. He also visited Lithuania in 2015.

As Lithuania commemorates the centenary of its declaration of independence, the President of Iceland Guðni Thorlacius Johannesson visited Lithuania, and also expressed his congratulations in a short video clip.

An Icelandic Lithuanian community operates in Iceland, which is as large as Iceland, and its members mainly live in the capital region. Meanwhile, in Lithuania in 2021 At the beginning of 2020, 25 Icelandic citizens lived there.

== High level visits ==
=== High-level visits from Iceland to Lithuania ===
- On 11–12 July 2023, Prime Minister Katrín Jakobsdóttir travelled to Vilnius to attend the 33rd NATO summit.

=== High-level visits from Lithuania to Iceland ===
- On 25–26 August 2022, President Gitanas Nausėda travelled to Reykjavík and have reception with President Guðni Th. Jóhannesson
- On 16–17 May 2023, President Gitanas Nausėda travelled to Reykjavík to attend the 4th Council of Europe summit.

== Migration ==
There was 1.652 Lithuanians living in Iceland 2015.

== Resident diplomatic missions ==
- Iceland is accredited to Lithuania from its embassy in Helsinki, Finland.
- Lithuania is accredited to Iceland from its embassy in Copenhagen, Denmark.

== See also ==
- Foreign relations of Iceland
- Foreign relations of Lithuania
- Iceland-EU relations
- NATO-EU relations
