= Lithuania–New Zealand relations =

- Lithuania: New Zealand

Diplomatic mission
- Embassy of Lithuania, Canberra: Embassy of New Zealand, Warsaw

Lithuanian–New Zealand relations are the bilateral relations between the Republic of Lithuania and New Zealand.

Interwar diplomatic relations were established after 1928. Diplomatic relations were restored on 10 January 1992.

Both countries are members of the United Nations, OECD, and other international organizations.

Lithuania is represented by an ambassador extraordinary and plenipotentiary residing in Tokyo (until 2021, Gediminas Varvuolis), and New Zealand is represented by an ambassador extraordinary and plenipotentiary residing in Warsaw. Auckland operates an honorary consulate of Lithuania.

== History ==
=== Early contacts ===
The first Lithuanians arrived in New Zealand in 1888. The number of emigrants from the Lithuanian community was small until the end of World War II.

=== Relations during the occupation of Lithuania ===
The number of Lithuanians in New Zealand increased significantly after World War II, as several hundred were allowed to move from German refugee camps. In 1949–1950, about 400 Lithuanians emigrated to New Zealand, most of whom later left for the United States of America, Canada, and Australia. Among the more famous New Zealand Lithuanians was the artist Rudolf Gopas.

After the occupation of Lithuania by the USSR, New Zealand was one of only two states in Oceania (with Australia) that maintained relations with Lithuanian diplomatic missions and pursued a silent policy of non-recognition. However, in 1974, New Zealand recognized the Soviet incorporation de jure.

In 1949, Lithuanians founded the Lithuanian Society, and in March 1951, it was renamed the New Zealand Lithuanian Community. The Society published the newspaper "New Zealand Lithuanian" in 1950–1958. A Lithuanian Sunday school was established in 1952 and operated until 1960. In 1956, the New Zealand Lithuanian community sent a telegram to the Prime Minister of Great Britain Anthony Eden with a request not to forget the problem of occupied Lithuania during a meeting with the leadership of the USSR, and in 1961 it delivered a letter of protest to the Brazilian government, which closed the Lithuanian embassy there.

Relations between Lithuanian expatriates and New Zealand changed significantly in 1974, when the New Zealand government recognised the annexation of the Baltic states, including Lithuania, as legal. The New Zealand Lithuanian community sent a letter of protest to the country's Prime Minister, other members of the government, and opposition leaders, informing the New Zealand public about the repressions taking place in Lithuania. Australia followed suit that same year, but New Zealand, unlike Australia, never reversed its decision.

During the Lithuanian revival (1988–1990), Lithuanians in New Zealand published articles in the country's daily newspapers about the Lithuanian nation's aspiration to restore an independent state.

=== Relations after 1991 ===
On 28 August 1991, New Zealand became the second Oceanian state, after Australia, to recognize Lithuania's independence.

On 14–15 September 2004, New Zealand's Foreign Minister Hon Phil Goff visited Lithuania, where he met with Lithuanian President Valdas Adamkus. This was the first visit of a high-ranking New Zealand official to Lithuania.

In March 2015, Lithuanian Foreign Minister Linas Linkevičius left for his first official visit to New Zealand, where he met with the Speaker of the Parliament David Carter, Foreign Affairs Minister Murray McCully and Opposition Foreign Affairs Speaker David Shearer. On 1 October 2015, an agreement was signed between the countries in New York on a working holiday program for Lithuanian and New Zealand citizens aged 18–30.

In June 2016, New Zealand's Minister of Foreign Affairs Murray McCully visited Lithuania and met with Lithuanian Minister of Foreign Affairs Linas Linkevičius.

In 2017, New Zealand Minister of Agriculture Nathan Guy visited Vilnius, where he met with Lithuanian Minister of Agriculture Bronius Markauskas, social partners, and chairmen of the Seimas Rural and European Affairs Committees.

== Educational, scientific and technological exchanges and cultural cooperation ==
Works by New Zealand authors Barbara Yving, Vičios Tamė Ihimaera, Katrina Mansfild, Antionos Makkartenos, and Brigid Lauri have been translated into Lithuanian.

On 18 July 2021, the first Lithuanian film festival was held in Auckland at the initiative of the local Lithuanian community.

== Economic relations ==
According to 2020 data, the trade turnover between Lithuania and New Zealand reached 21.2 million euros, and New Zealand was Lithuania's 76th largest trading partner.

The trade balance is dominated by exports from Lithuania to New Zealand.

- Exports amount to 13.5 million euros; New Zealand is the 72nd largest export partner.
- Imports amount to 7.7 million euros; New Zealand is the 63rd largest import partner. The most imported products are unscalded and uncombed wool (79%) and chemical (soda or sulphate) wood pulp (14%).

In 2021, New Zealand's foreign direct investment in Lithuania was negative. Meanwhile, Lithuania had no direct investment in New Zealand in 2020.

== Citizen exchanges ==
Year	2016	2020	2021	2022
Number of New Zealand citizens in Lithuania	7	6	9	15

Year	2013	2019
Number of Lithuanian citizens in New Zealand	129	219

The Lithuanian community in New Zealand, established in 1951, is currently active. The number of Lithuanians in New Zealand has remained largely constant for the past sixty years, although it decreased to 111 in 2001, increased again to 258 in 2013, and decreased slightly to 219 in 2019. Meanwhile, 207 Lithuanians lived in New Zealand in 1956.

As of January 2022, 15 New Zealand citizens lived in Lithuania.

== Relations with territories in free association with New Zealand ==
Lithuania has established trade relations with two territories in free association with New Zealand: the Cook Islands and Niue.

=== Cook Islands ===
In 2018, trade turnover between Lithuania and the Cook Islands reached 2,400 euros.

The trade balance is dominated by imports from the Cook Islands to Lithuania.

- Exports amount to 300 euros.
- Imports amount to 2,100 euros.

=== Niue ===
2018 data, trade turnover between Lithuania and Niue reached 36,900. There were no goods exported to Niue.

== Literature ==
- Kraujelis, Ramojus (2008). Lithuania in Western Politics: Western States' Positions on the Occupation and Annexation of Lithuania in 1940-1953 (in Lithuanian). Vilnius: Vilnius University Press. p. 312. ISBN 978-9955-33-371-5.

== Resident diplomatic missions ==
- Lithuania is accredited to New Zealand from its embassy in Canberra, Australia.
- New Zealand is accredited to Lithuania from its embassy in Warsaw, Poland.

== See also ==
- Foreign relations of Lithuania
- Foreign relations of New Zealand
