= Estonia–Lithuania relations =

Bilateral relations of Estonia and Lithuania

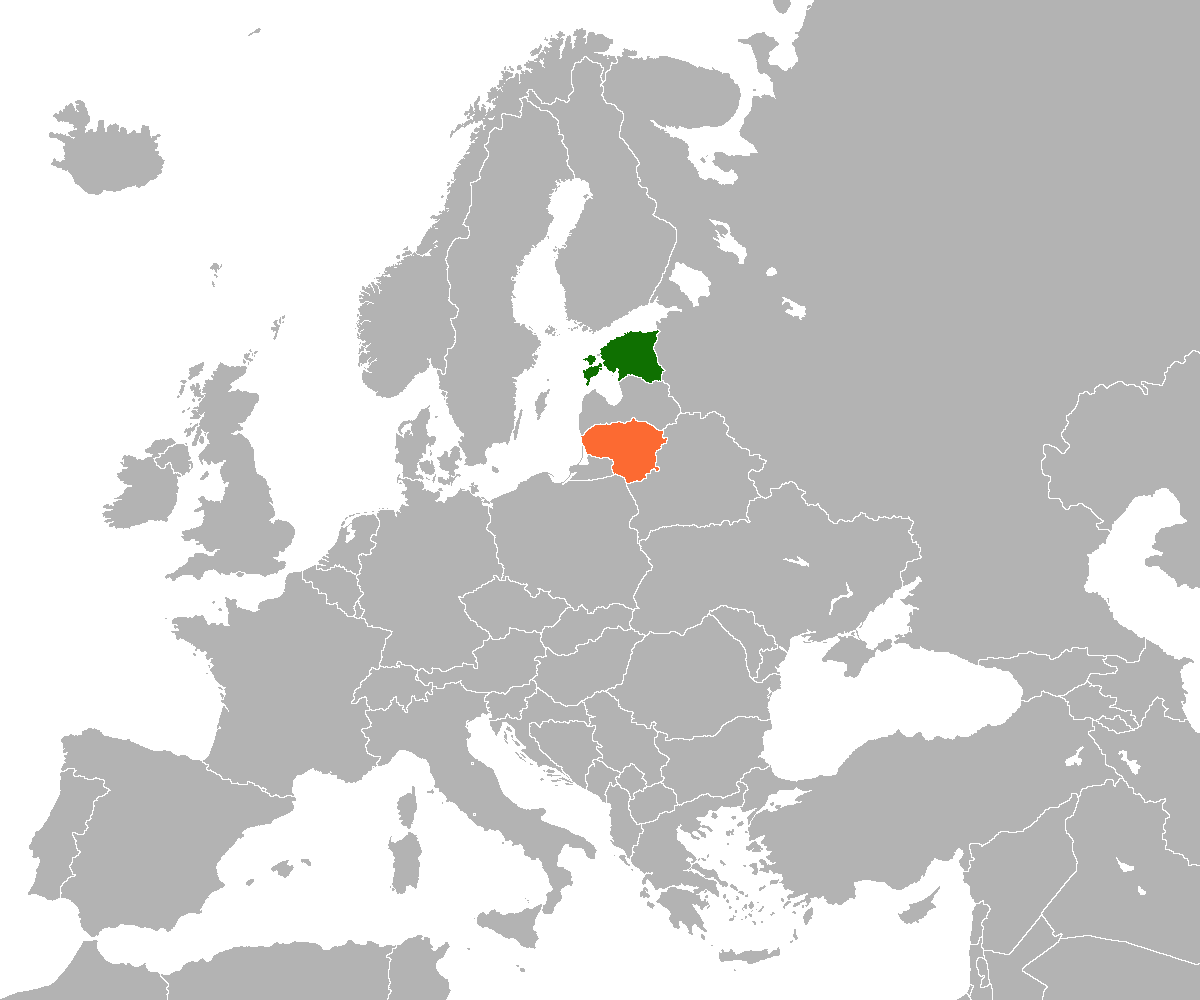

- Estonia: Lithuania

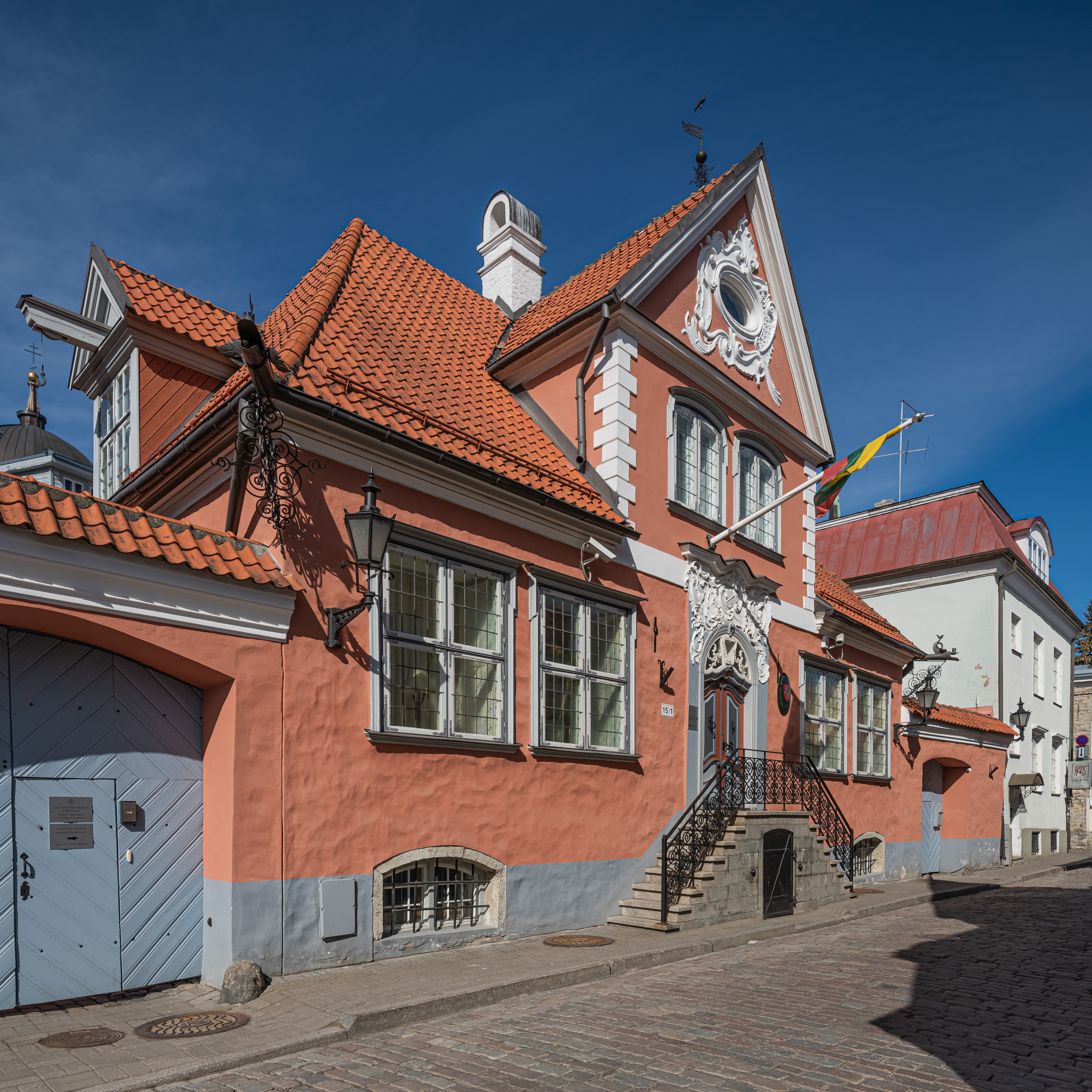
Lithuanian Embassy in Tallinn

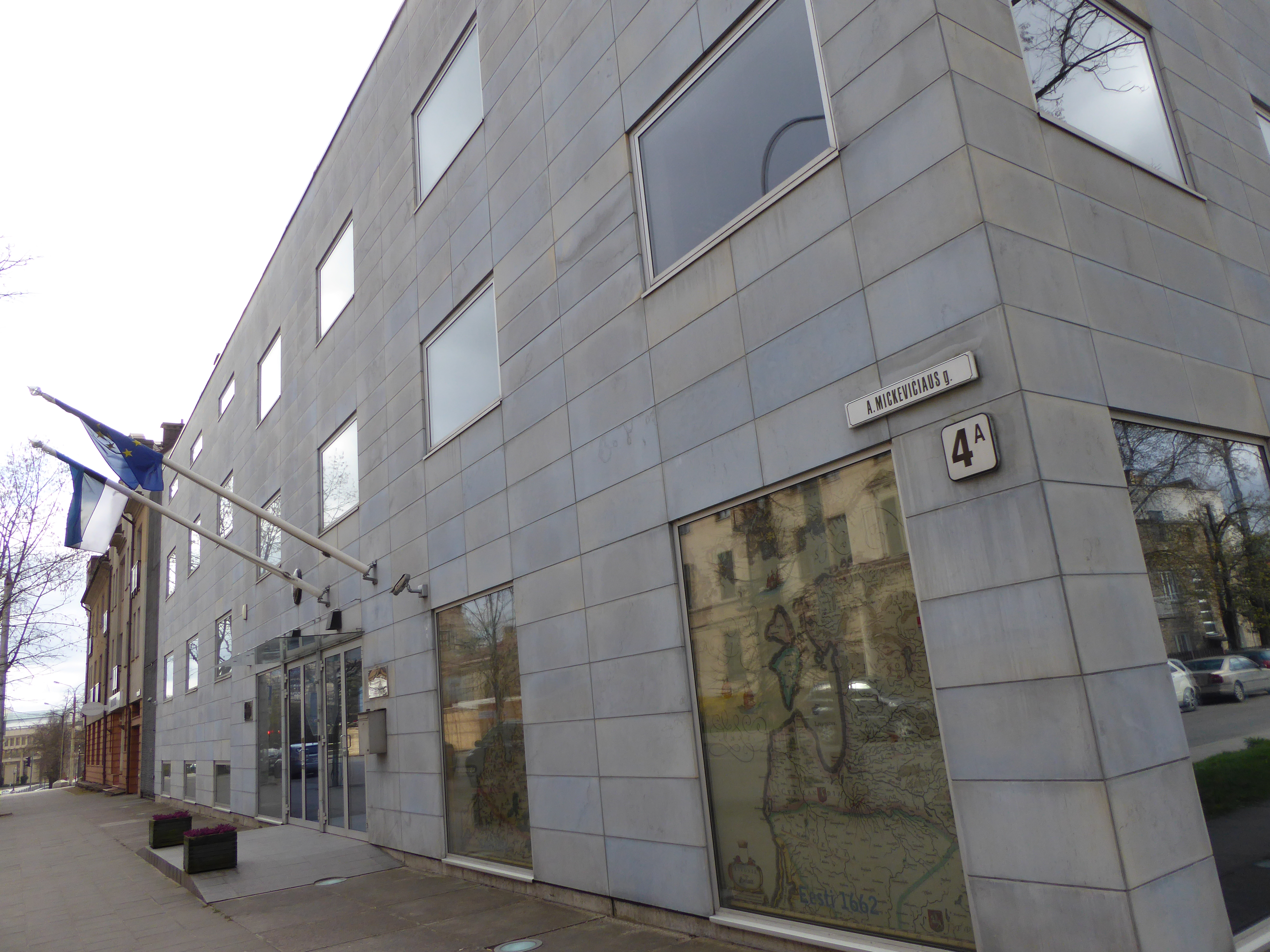
Estonian Embassy in Vilnius

Estonia–Lithuania relations refer to the bilateral relations between Estonia and Lithuania. Estonia has an embassy in Vilnius. Lithuania has an embassy in Tallinn. Both countries are situated in the Baltic region and are the full members of the Council of the Baltic Sea States, Joint Expeditionary Force, European Union and NATO.

== History ==
=== Modern relations ===
Lithuania and Estonia officially established diplomatic relations on 2 March 1921. Following the Soviet occupation after World War II, both states continued the diplomatic service in exile. After the independence restoration, the relations were re-established de facto on 16 June 1991.

== Agreements ==
Many of the agreements between the two countries are trilateral with Latvia as the three Baltic states.

In 2004, the free trade agreement signed in 1992 between the Baltic states was superseded when all three countries joined the European Union.

In 2017, the two countries along with Latvia, signed a rail agreement. The agreement is a precondition for a possible high speed railway between the states.

== European Union and NATO ==
Both countries became members of the European Union and NATO in 2004.

== Resident diplomatic missions ==
- Estonia has an embassy in Vilnius.
- Lithuania has an embassy in Tallinn.

== See also ==
- Foreign relations of Estonia
- Foreign relations of Lithuania
- 2004 enlargement of the European Union
- Estonians in Lithuania
