= Finland–Lithuania relations =

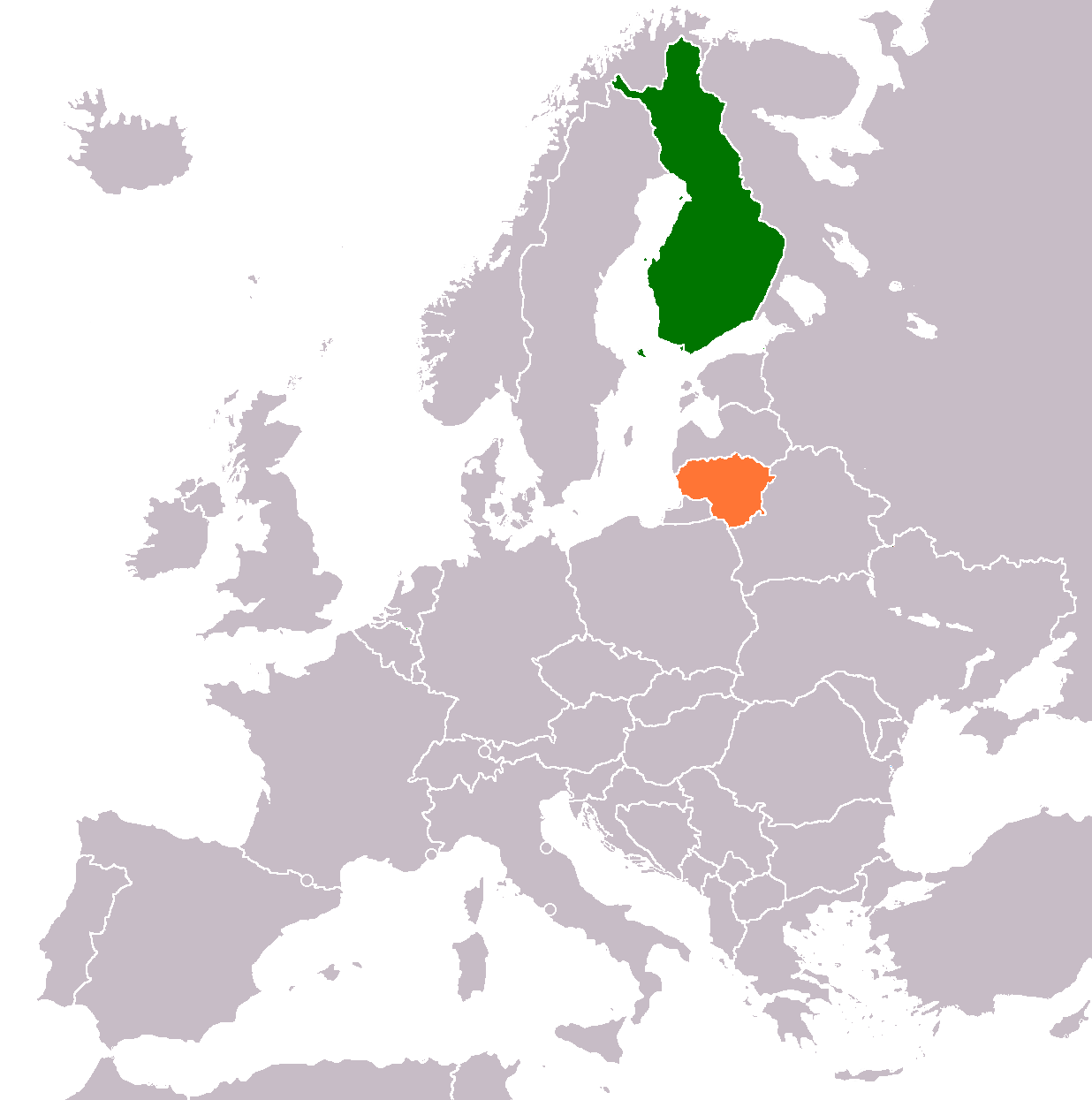

- Finland: Lithuania

Finland–Lithuania relations are foreign relations between the Republic of Finland and the Republic of Lithuania. Both countries are full members of the Council of Europe, Council of the Baltic Sea States, Nordic-Baltic Eight, European Union, NATO, Eurozone and Joint Expeditionary Force.

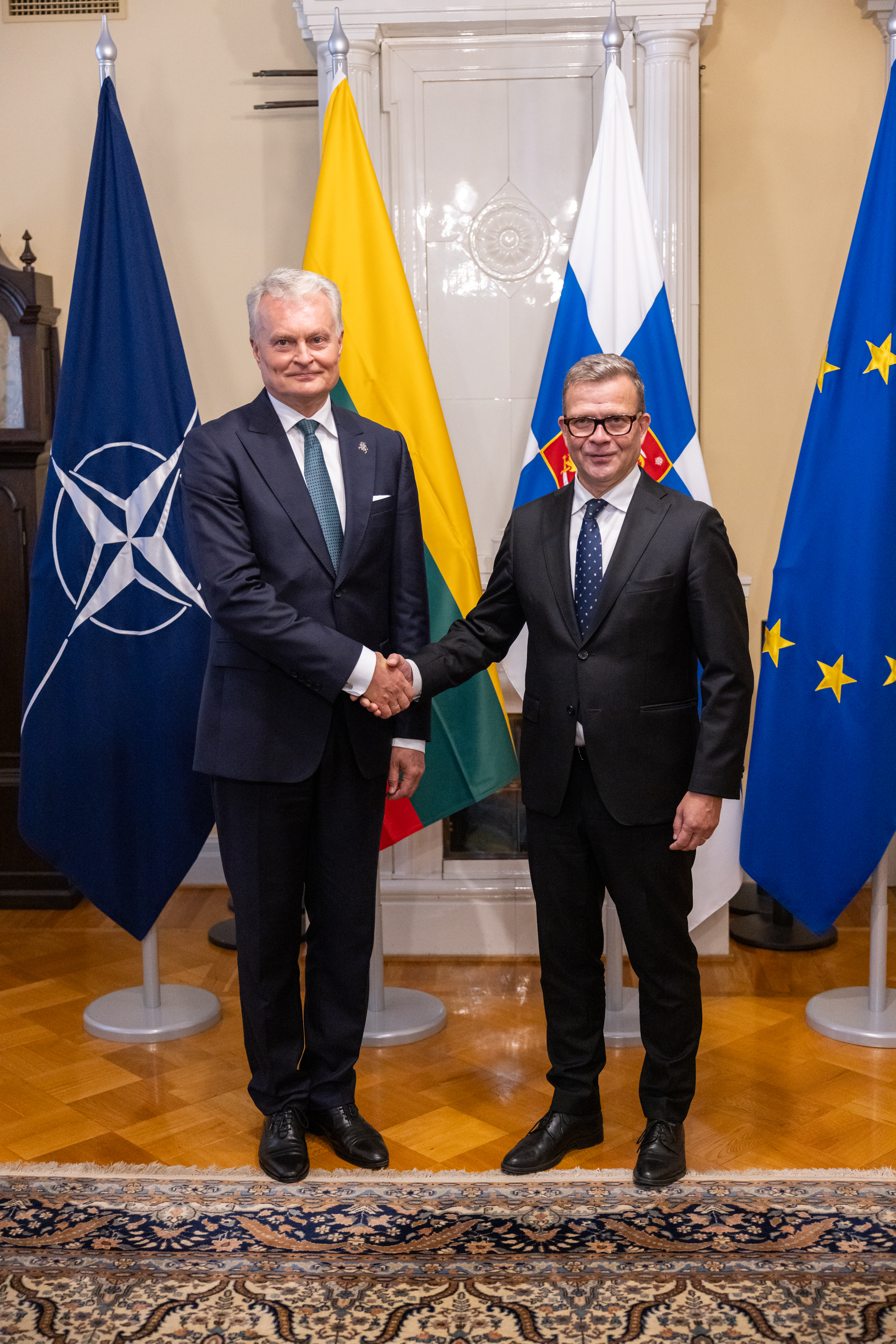
Lithuanian President Gitanas Nausėda met with Finnish Prime Minister Petteri Orpo in Helsinki, 2 September 2025

== History ==
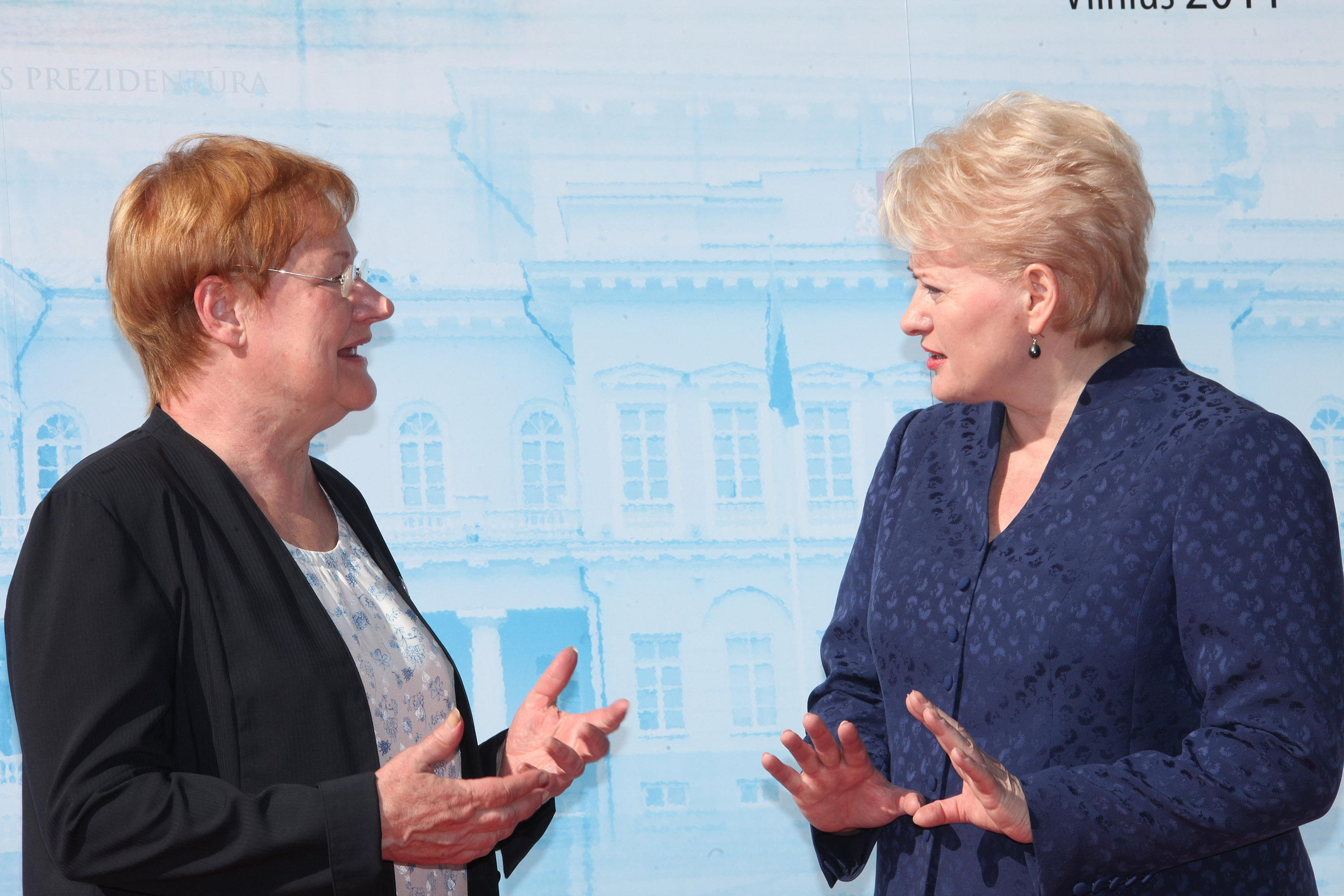
Finnish President Tarja Halonen talk with the President of Lithuania Dalia Grybauskaitė in 2011

Finland recognised Lithuania's independence de facto on November 14, 1919, and de jure on October 14, 1921.

Finland recognised Lithuania's independence on 28 August 1991, and the two countries started diplomatic relations the very same day. Finland is a key partner and neighbour to Lithuania, with the countries pursuing active cooperation in the fields of economy, energy, regional, information security, to name a few. Currently, there are 11 bilateral agreements regulating the relationship between Lithuania and Finland different fields. In July 2022, the Lithuania fully approved Finland's application for NATO membership.

== High-level visits ==
=== High-level visits from Finland to Lithuania ===
Finnish President Sauli Niinistö:

- May 2013
- February 2018
- July 2023, Niinistö attended 2023 Vilnius NATO summit.

=== High-level visits from Lithuania to Finland ===
Lithuanian President Gitanas Nausėda:

- November 2019
- September 2025, Attended the EuroBasket 2025 Group B game between Finland and Lithuania.

== Resident diplomatic missions ==
- Finland has an embassy in Vilnius and an honorary consulate in Klaipėda.
- Lithuania has an embassy in Helsinki.

== List of ambassadors ==
The following ambassadors have represented Finland in Vilnius since the reestablishment of diplomatic relations with restored Lithuania on 29 August 1991:

- Taisto Tolvanen 1992–1996
- Rauno Viemerö 1996–2000
- Taina Kiekko 2000–2004
- Timo Lahelma 2004–2008
- Marja-Liisa Kiljunen 2008–2012
- Harri Mäki-Reinikka 2013–2016
- Christer Michelsson 2016–2020
- Arja Makkonen 2020-2024
- Jaakko Lehtovirta since 2024

== See also ==
- Foreign relations of Finland
- Foreign relations of Lithuania
- NATO-EU relations
