= Antanas Valionis =

Lithuanian politician

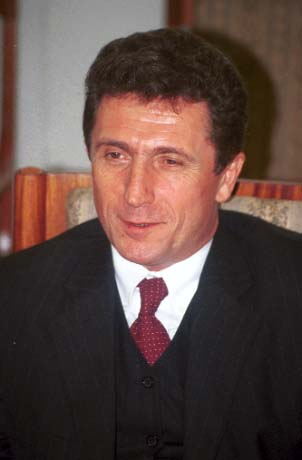

Minister of Foreign Affairs
- In office 9 November 2000 – 18 July 2006
- Prime Minister: Rolandas Paksas Eugenijus Gentvilas; Algirdas Brazauskas; Zigmantas Balčytis Gediminas Kirkilas
- Preceded by: Algirdas Saudargas
- Succeeded by: Petras Vaitiekūnas

Personal details
- Born: 21 September 1950 (age 75) Zabieliškis, Lithuania
- Party: New Union

Antanas Valionis (born September 21, 1950) is a Lithuanian politician, currently a member of the New Union party.

He was appointed the Lithuanian Minister of Foreign Affairs on October 30, 2000, and reappointed on July 5, 2001. He resigned on August 31, 2006.

From 1981 he served in the Soviet secret police KGB in Riga reaching the rank of captain. Afterwards he served in the KGB active reserve.

Between 1994 and 2000, he was accredited Ambassador Extraordinary and Plenipotentiary of the Republic of Lithuania to the Republic of Poland. From 1996 to 2000, he was also accredited to Romania and the Republic of Bulgaria.

Since November 9, 2000, he was minister of Foreign Affairs in the eleventh, twelfth and thirteenth governments.

From 2004 to 2008, he was member of the Seimas.

In 2006, after a change in the balance of political forces, he resigned from the post of minister.

Between November 20, 2008 to June 19, 2011, Lithuanian Ambassador to Latvia. From 2011 to 2017 Ambassador for Special Assignments.
