= Libya–Lithuania relations =

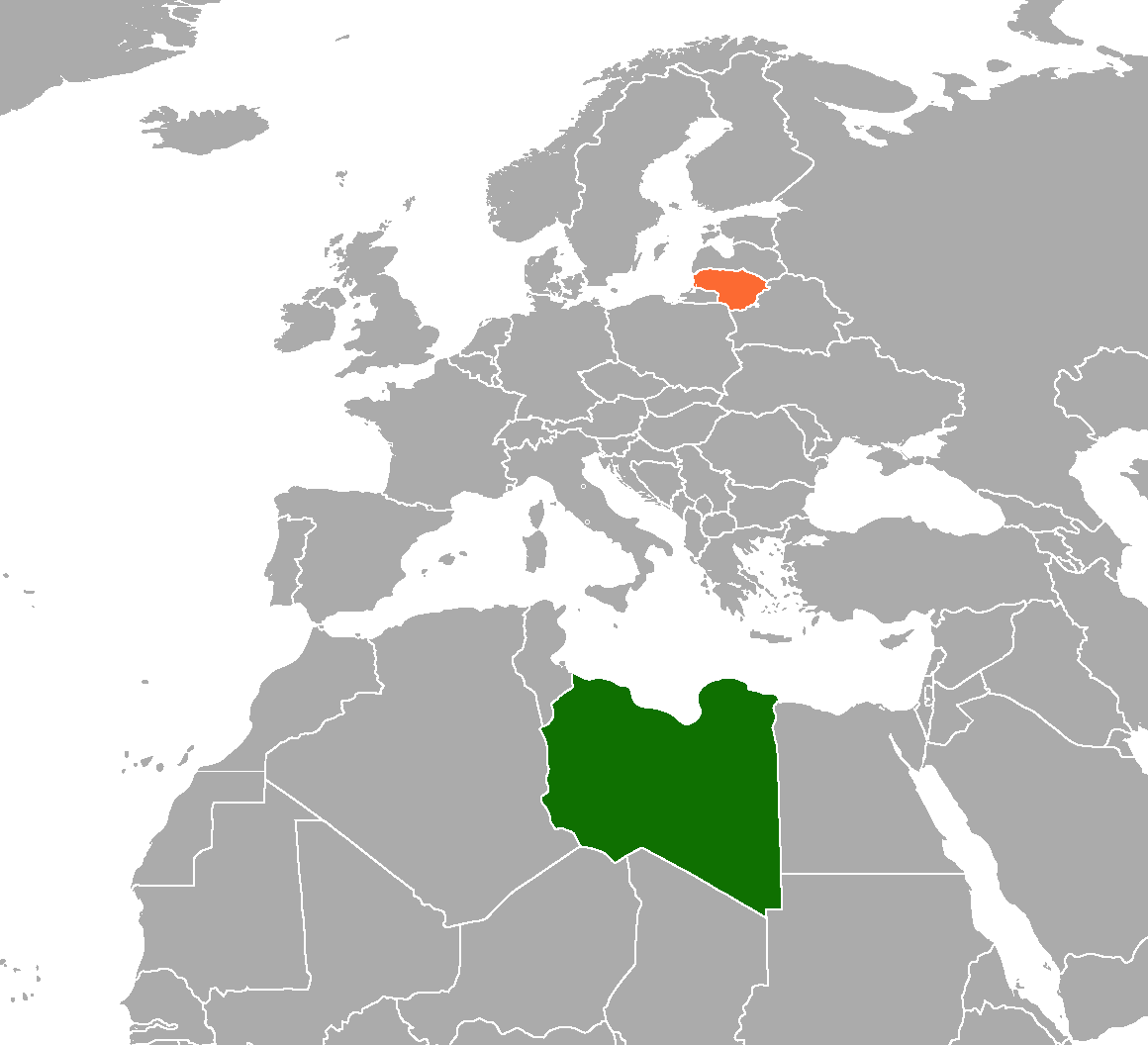

- Libya: Lithuania

Libya–Lithuania relations are the bilateral relations between Libya and Lithuania. The two countries are members of the United Nations.

== History ==
Both countries established diplomatic relations on 11 June 2008.

Libya recognized the independence of Lithuania from the Soviet Union on 3 September 1991, making them second on the African continent after PAR to do so. On 6 September 1991, Libyan leader Muammar Gaddafi sent a telegram in which, addressing the Chairman of the Republic of Lithuania Vytautas Landsbergis, he congratulated Lithuania on declaring independence from the "so-called Soviet Union", noting in the telegram parallels between the Soviet occupation and the Ottoman rule in Libya.

Bilateral relations between the Baltic states were established on 11 June 2008, after Lithuania's permanent representative to the United Nations, Ambassador Dalius Čekuolis, and Libya's permanent representative to the United Nations, Ambassador Dziadala A. Etalhi, signed a joint communique establishing diplomatic relations between Lithuania and Libya on behalf of the governments of both countries in New York, U.S. From October 27–29 of the same year, a delegation of Lithuanian diplomats and businessmen, led by State Secretary of the Ministry of Foreign Affairs of Lithuania Deividas Matulionis, visited Libya in order to establish closer political and business relations. During the visit, a memorandum of understanding was signed regarding bilateral consultations between the Lithuanian and Libyan foreign ministries. A draft of the intergovernmental agreement on investment promotion and protection was handed over to Libya, and meetings were held with officials of the foreign relations structures of the Libyan Ministry of Foreign Affairs and Parliament.

In 2010, the countries exchanged diplomatic representatives. Ambassador Abdulhafed Gaduras residing in Rome was accredited for Lithuania, and Petras Zapolskas, also residing in Rome, was accredited for Libya (he presented the credentials in 2010). However, in 2012, the Libyan ambassador recalled from the position of ambassador to Italy (and thus also to Lithuania), despite the fact that a year earlier, he had switched to the side of Muammar Gaddafi's opponents. It is not known if Libyan ambassadors accredited to Lithuania since then.

In 2011, after the civil war started in Libya, Lithuanian Vice Minister of Foreign Affairs Egidijus Meilunas declared Lithuania's readiness to contribute to the solution of the Libyan crisis at an extraordinary meeting of the Foreign Affairs Council on 10 March 2011 in Brussels. On 22 February 2011, Lithuanian Foreign Minister Audronius Ažubalis, who at the time also held the position of chairman of the Organization for Security and Co-operation in Europe, condemned the "repression against civilians" in Libya, carried out by the "Government of Muammar el Gaddafi", and expressed his "condolences to the families of the victims", urging both sides of the conflict to "start a dialogue". Lithuania approved on 17 March 2011 for Resolution 1973, adopted by the United Nations Security Council, which provided requirements and sanctions for Muammar Gaddafi's regime and measures to be used by the international community to solve problems in Libya, and actively joined the NATO and EU discussions on the means of implementing this resolution.

On 20 June 2011, Abduraham Ash Algam, the representative of the National Transitional Council at the United Nations, and Abdulhafed Gadur, the ambassador accredited to Lithuania, visited Vilnius, where they met with Asta Skaisgiryte Liauškiene, the Deputy Minister of Foreign Affairs of Lithuania. The vice-minister noted that Lithuania "condemns the continuing violations of human rights in Libya" and "expresses concern about the worsening humanitarian situation" and mentioned that Lithuania has contributed to the provision of humanitarian aid to the Libyan population.

== Educational, scientific and technological exchange and cultural cooperation ==
in 2017, Guests from Libya participated in the events of Arab Culture Days held in Vilnius, Kaunas, Rukla, and Visaginas.

== Trade ==
In 2018, according to data, trade turnover between Lithuania and Libya reached €39.12 million.

The trade balance is dominated by exports from Lithuania to Libya.

Exports amount to €39.12 million and imports amount to around €10,000.

== Resident diplomatic missions ==
- Libya is accredited to Lithuania from its embassy in Stockholm.
- Lithuania is accredited to Libya from its embassy in Rome.
