= Petras Vaitiekūnas =

Lithuanian politician

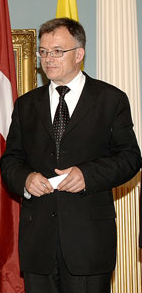

Minister of Foreign Affairs
- In office 12 July 2006 – 9 December 2008
- Prime Minister: Gediminas Kirkilas
- Preceded by: Antanas Valionis
- Succeeded by: Vygaudas Ušackas

Personal details
- Born: 26 March 1953 (age 73) Liudvinavas, Lithuania

Petras Vaitiekūnas (born 26 March 1953, in Liudvinavas, Marijampolė County) is a Lithuanian politician who was the foreign minister of Lithuania from 2006 to 2008.

Petras Vaitiekūnas was a signatory to the Lithuanian declaration of independence in 1990 and a member of the Lithuanian Supreme Council from 1990 to 1992. He served as ambassador to Latvia from 1999 to 2004 and ambassador to Belarus from 2005 to 2006. He was appointed Foreign Minister of Lithuania on 12 July 2006.

Political offices
Preceded by Antanas Valionis	Minister of Foreign Affairs; 12 July 2006–9 December 2008	Succeeded by Vygaudas Ušackas
