= Recognition of same-sex unions in Lithuania =

Lithuania has allowed same-sex couples to register civil partnerships through the courts since 17 April 2025, when the Constitutional Court of Lithuania ordered the Seimas to legislate to allow civil unions granting same-sex couples some legal rights and benefits. The court also opened the possibility for same-sex couples to register civil partnerships through the courts, even in the absence of specific legislation.

Lithuania does not recognise same-sex marriages, which are explicitly prohibited by the Lithuanian Constitution.

== Civil partnerships ==
=== Background ===
In 2011, the Constitutional Court of Lithuania ruled that the family does not derive exclusively from marriage, opening the possibility for partnerships or other forms of legal recognition to be introduced to same-sex couples. On 25 March 2015, nine MPs from the Social Democratic Party and the Liberals' Movement introduced a civil partnership bill to the Seimas. Prime Minister Algirdas Butkevičius expressed opposition to the bill. On 6 May 2015, the Committee on Legal Affairs announced that it could find no constitutional barriers to same-sex civil partnerships. However, the bill was not voted on and died at the end of the legislative session in November 2016. A similar bill was introduced by deputies from the Liberal Movement on 30 May 2017, but was rejected at first reading in a 29–59 vote with 20 abstentions on 15 June 2017.

In 2017, the Lithuanian Farmers and Greens Union and the Homeland Union proposed a bill to establish "cohabitation agreements" (Lithuanian: susitarimo dėl bendro gyvenimo) as an alternative to civil partnerships. The proposed legislation would have guaranteed same-sex partners hospital visitation rights and the right to inherit a late partner's property. MP Povilas Urbšys, one of the authors of the proposal, said: "Our registered project will effectively contribute to legal clarity, regulate property rights and some property unrelated relations between people living together and will also help to avoid negative consequences when the cohabitation is dissolved." The proposal, which was criticised by LGBT groups, explicitly stipulated that the cohabitants entering the agreement did not intend to create family relations. The proposal was preliminarily approved by the Seimas with 46 votes for, 17 votes against and 6 abstentions on 31 May 2017, and sent to further consideration. On 25 October 2017, the Lithuanian Government announced its support for the bill, but it stalled and was not voted on before the end of the legislative session. On 14 February 2018, appearing at a demonstration in Vilnius, Prime Minister Saulius Skvernelis called on the Seimas to pass a same-sex partnership law. Of the eight candidates running in the 2019 presidential election, five expressed support for registered partnerships, including the eventual winner of the election, Gitanas Nausėda. The other three candidates expressed support for limited legal rights such as inheritance and property rights, among others.

=== Failed attempts in 2021–2025 ===
In December 2020, MP Tomas Vytautas Raskevičius from the Freedom Party said that the government would submit a civil partnership bill to Parliament in March 2021. The bill's introduction was a condition for creating the ruling coalition formed following the 2020 parliamentary election. In May 2021, an estimated 10,000 people demonstrated in Vilnius to oppose the partnership legislation. On 25 May 2021, the civil partnership bill was defeated at first reading, receiving 63 votes in favour, two short of the 65 required. Raskevičius said the bill would be brought back to Parliament in an amended form during the autumn session.

Legislation creating civil unions was drafted by a group of MPs and introduced to Parliament in May 2022. The proposal was a compromise after the more expansive civil partnership bill was defeated in 2021. The legislation would establish civil unions offering some of the rights and benefits of marriage, including joint property ownership and the ability to make medical decisions for a partner, while not allowing for joint adoption. On 26 May 2022, it passed first reading in the Seimas by 70 votes in favour, 49 votes against and 6 abstentions. On the same day, an alternative draft amendment to the Civil Code aiming to "regulate the recognition of a person's right to close relations" also passed its first reading, with 70 votes in favour, 23 votes against and 30 abstentions. Actress Elžbieta Latanaitė said in response, "My feelings are mixed after the vote. On the one hand, the parliament took a step towards Europe, towards Western values. But on the other hand, there's nothing joyous that even such a restrained bill cannot pass without a big fight, with powerful homophobes hurling insults at citizens who want equal rights". President Gitanas Nausėda declined to take an official position on the bills, but in a September 2023 interview said that efforts to allow same-sex unions were "a sign of a civilized state".

26 May 2022 vote in the Seimas
Party	Voted for	Voted against	Abstained	Absent (Did not vote)
G Homeland Union	38: Laima Liucija Andrikienė; Arvydas Anušauskas; Dalia Asanavičiūtė; Kristijonas Bartoševičius; Agnė Bilotaitė; Justas Džiugelis; Aistė Gedvilienė; Jonas Gudauskas; Irena Haase; Sergejus Jovaiša; Vytautas Juozapaitis; Vytautas Kernagis; Andrius Kupčinskas; Paulė Kuzmickienė; Gabrielius Landsbergis; Mindaugas Lingė; Mykolas Majauskas; Matas Maldeikis; Kęstutis Masiulis; Bronislovas Matelis; Radvilė Morkūnaitė-Mikulėnienė; Andrius Navickas; Monika Navickienė; Žygimantas Pavilionis; Audrius Petrošius; Liuda Pociūnienė; Jurgis Razma; Stasys Šedbaras; Jurgita Sejonienė; Ingrida Šimonytė; Jurgita Šiugždinienė; Gintarė Skaistė; Mindaugas Skritulskas; Linas Slušnys; Kazys Starkevičius; Arūnas Valinskas; Andrius Vyšniauskas; Emanuelis Zingeris	7: Vilija Aleknaitė-Abramikienė; Audronius Ažubalis; Laurynas Kasčiūnas; Edmundas Pupinis; Valdas Rakutis; Paulius Saudargas; Justinas Urbanavičius	–	5: Antanas Čepononis; Dainius Kreivys; Antanas Matulas; Arvydas Pocius; Algis Strelčiūnas
Lithuanian Farmers and Greens Union	–	16: Algimantas Dumbrava; Dainius Gaižauskas; Ligita Girskienė; Jonas Jarutis; Eugenijus Jovaiša; Dainius Kepenis; Gintautas Kindurys; Asta Kubilienė; Deividas Labanavičius; Aušrinė Norkienė; Rimantė Šalaševičiūtė; Giedrius Surplys; Stasys Tumėnas; Juozas Varžgalys; Aurelijus Veryga; Antanas Vinkus	1: Robertas Šarknickas	3: Valius Ąžuolas; Guoda Burokienė; Arvydas Nekrošius
Union of Democrats "For Lithuania"	5: Vytautas Bakas; Domas Griškevičius; Rūta Miliūtė; Lukas Savickas; Tomas Tomilinas	8: Zigmantas Balčytis; Rima Baškienė; Algirdas Butkevičius; Kęstutis Mažeika; Laima Mogenienė; Algirdas Stončaitis; Zenonas Streikus; Vilija Targamadzė	2: Linas Kukuraitis; Laima Nagienė	1: Saulius Skvernelis
G Liberals' Movement	9: Virgilijus Alekna; Andrius Bagdonas; Viktorija Čmilytė-Nielsen; Eugenijus Gentvilas; Simonas Gentvilas; Raimundas Lopata; Arminas Lydeka; Edita Rudelienė; Romualdas Vaitkus	1: Juozas Baublys	–	3: Ričardas Juška; Viktoras Pranckietis; Jonas Varkalys
Social Democratic Party	7: Rasa Budbergytė; Linas Jonauskas; Orinta Leiputė; Gintautas Paluckas; Julius Sabatauskas; Dovilė Šakalienė; Algirdas Sysas	2: Liudas Jonaitis; Kęstutis Vilkauskas	1: Tomas Bičiūnas	2: Vidmantas Kanopa; Eugenijus Sabutis
G Freedom Party	11: Kasparas Adomaitis; Aušrinė Armonaitė; Morgana Danielė; Ewelina Dobrowolska; Silva Lengvinienė; Marius Matijošaitis; Vytautas Mitalas; Monika Ošmianskienė; Ieva Pakarklytė; Tomas Vytautas Raskevičius; Artūras Žukauskas	–	–	–
Labour Party	–	7: Valentinas Bukauskas; Viktoras Fiodorovas; Aidas Gedvilas; Vaida Giraitytė-Juškevičienė; Vigilijus Jukna; Andrius Mazuronis; Artūras Skardžius	1: Ieva Kačinskaitė-Urbonienė	1: Vytautas Gapšys
Lithuanian Regions Political Group (Note: The alliance was composed of the Electoral Action of Poles in Lithuania – Christian Families Alliance, the Lithuanian Regions Party, Freedom and Justice, the People and Justice Union, and 3 independents.)	–	8: Petras Gražulis; Česlav Olševski; Andrius Palionis; Beata Petkevič; Jonas Pinskus; Agnė Širinskienė; Rita Tamašunienė; Valdemaras Valkiūnas	1: Remigijus Žemaitaitis	–
Independent	–	–	–	1: Mindaugas Puidokas
Total	70	49	6	16
Total	49.6%	34.8%	4.3%	11.3%

In September 2022, the Committee on Legal Affairs approved the civil union bill 6–1 and recommended that the Seimas pass it and reject the alternative "close connection agreement" bill. In April 2023, the Vilnius District Court rejected a same-sex couple's request to enter into a civil partnership, ruling that Lithuania lacked a partnership law and that the matter was for Parliament to address. The civil union bill passed its second reading on 23 May 2023 by a vote of 60–52 with 3 abstentions. Some lawmakers expressed doubts that the bill would receive a third reading before the May 2024 presidential election. In June 2024, the Freedom Party announced it would block the government's candidate for European Commissioner until it agreed to pass the civil union bill. In the last few days of the legislative session in July 2024, the parties came to an agreement on the civil union bill and placed it on the agenda for a vote on the final day of the session. Although the Social Democrats had campaigned on supporting civil unions, they announced they would boycott the final reading, meaning the bill would be unable to pass without their votes. On 25 July, the government voluntarily pulled the bill from the schedule rather than allowing it to fail, which would allow it to be brought back by a new parliament following the October parliamentary election rather than starting the process over again.

The election resulted in the formation of a government composed of the Social Democrats and two socially-conservative parties, the Union of Democrats "For Lithuania" and the Dawn of Nemunas, which oppose registered partnerships. In November, the Dawn of Nemunas party expressed its opposition to including the draft partnership bill in the new coalition's governing programme. President Nausėda expressed opposition to the bill in February 2025.

=== 2025 Constitutional Court ruling and aftermath ===
In early April 2025, the Constitutional Court announced it would hear oral arguments in a case filed by the previous government that denying same-sex couples the possibility to solemnize their partnerships "violates the constitutional principle of equality, discriminates against same-sex couples who have effectively formed family relationships, and violates their constitutional rights to legal protection of dignity and private life". On 17 April 2025, the court ruled that the lack of legal recognition for same-sex couples was unconstitutional. It found that article 3.229 of the Civil Code, which permitted partnerships exclusively between "a man and a woman", violated the Constitution. In addition, it ruled that the lack of legal recognition of same-sex partnerships contradicted the principles of human dignity and respect for private and family life, and that societal stereotypes could not justify denying or restricting fundamental rights and freedoms. Consequently, the court mandated the Lithuanian Parliament to enact legislation recognizing same-sex civil partnerships. In its ruling, the Constitutional Court also opened a legal pathway for same-sex couples to register civil partnerships through the courts, even in the absence of specific legislation. The first same-sex union was recognised in Vilnius in August 2025.

On 24 April, Prime Minister Gintautas Paluckas stated that the government would prepare legislation to legalise gender-neutral partnerships. "The Ministry of Justice will definitely prepare some proposals. Whether there is political will in the Seimas to resolve the rights of a certain group, we will see", said Paluckas. Such legislation would likely establish civil unions (Lithuanian: civilinė sąjunga, pronounced [tsʲɪˈvʲɪlʲɪnʲeː ˈsâːjʊŋgɐ]) (Note: Polish: rejestrowany związek partnerski, pronounced [rɛ.jɛstrɔˈvanɨ ˈzvjɔ̃zɛk parˈtnɛrskʲi]; Samogitian: cėvėlėnė sājonga) offering some of the rights and benefits of marriage. On 17 June, Speaker Saulius Skvernelis said the government would not put the bill on the parliamentary agenda, because "the government believes it should bring forward its own bill and restart the whole process". If passed, the bill is expected to come into force on 1 July 2026. In early November, a cross-party group of MPs introduced their own civil union bill after Minister of Justice Rita Tamašunienė said she would not prepare a government-backed partnership bill. In March 2026, a group of conservative lawmakers introduced a motion to conduct a referendum on banning same-sex unions in the Lithuanian Constitution, accusing the Constitutional Court of having introduced "chaos in the legal system" with its April 2025 ruling.

== Same-sex marriage ==
Laws regarding same-sex partnerships in Europe¹ Marriage Civil union Limited domestic recognition (cohabitation) Unrecognized Constitution limits marriage to opposite-sex couples ¹ May include recent laws or court decisions that have not yet entered into effect.

=== Constitutional ban ===
Same-sex marriage is not legal in Lithuania, as the Civil Code defines marriage as a "voluntary agreement between a man and a woman". Moreover, an additional article in the Civil Code explicitly bans same-sex marriages. Nevertheless, a drive to amend the Constitution of Lithuania to ban same-sex marriages was reportedly under way in December 2005 by a social conservative member of the Seimas who had started collecting signatures. MP Julius Sabatauskas, however, denounced the plan as unnecessary as "the Constitution already bans same-sex marriage". Article 38 of the Constitution states: "Marriage shall be concluded upon the free mutual consent of man and woman." (Note: Lithuanian: Santuoka sudaroma laisvu vyro ir moters sutarimu.)

=== Recognition of marriages performed abroad ===
On 5 June 2018, the European Court of Justice (ECJ) ruled in favour of a Romanian-American same-sex couple seeking recognition of their marriage in Romania, so that the American partner could reside in the country. The court held in Coman and Others v General Inspectorate for Immigration and Ministry of the Interior that European Union (EU) member states must uphold the freedom of movement and residency rights of same-sex spouses, provided that one partner is an EU citizen. While EU member states may choose whether to legalise same-sex marriage, they cannot restrict the right of residence for EU citizens and their spouses. The ECJ also clarified that the term "spouse" is gender-neutral and does not necessarily refer to someone of the opposite sex. On 11 January 2019, the Constitutional Court ruled that the government must grant residency permits to the same-sex spouses of EU citizens in compliance with the ECJ ruling.

In April 2023, three same-sex couples filed a lawsuit challenging the government's refusal to establish civil partnerships and its refusal to recognise same-sex marriages validly performed abroad. "For a long time, it has been misinterpreted that the Lithuanian Constitution prohibits same-sex marriages, but this is a myth that we will try to dispel in court. Especially since more than half of EU member countries have already legalized same-sex marriages," said a lawyer representing the couples. The couples also cited the European Court of Human Rights' January 2023 ruling in Fedotova and Others v. Russia that Article 8 of the European Convention on Human Rights, which guarantees a right to private and family life, imposes a positive obligation on all member states of the Council of Europe to recognize same-sex partnerships. On 28 July 2023, a court in Vilnius dismissed the lawsuit, ruling that Article 38 of the Constitution "is clear and specific, and does not give rise to any presumption that it can be interpreted as conferring the right to marry irrespective of the sex of the persons concerned". The couples announced their intention to appeal the decision. In May 2025, a same-sex couple who had legally married in Belgium filed a lawsuit seeking recognition of their foreign marriage license in Lithuania.

In a legal case involving a dual Polish-German couple who had married in Germany but sought recognition of their marriage in Poland, Jakub Cupriak-Trojan and Mateusz Trojan v Wojewoda Mazowiecki, the European Court of Justice ruled on 25 November 2025 that Poland must recognise same-sex marriages performed in other member states of the European Union. The ruling had an immediate legal effect in Lithuania as well, with media outlets reporting that "authorities must recognize same-sex marriages performed abroad as full marriages, rather than just granting them the limited rights of a registered partnership". Cupriak-Trojan and Trojan does not compel Lithuania to change its domestic laws to legalise same-sex marriage, but it does require that the country accept the legal status of couples married elsewhere in the European Union.

=== Religious performance ===
The Catholic Church opposes same-sex marriage and does not allow its priests to officiate at such marriages. In December 2023, the Holy See published Fiducia supplicans, a declaration allowing Catholic priests to bless couples who are not considered to be married according to church teaching, including the blessing of same-sex couples. The Archbishop of Vilnius, Gintaras Grušas, released a statement on 22 December that "[t]he declaration encourages believers to realize that the Church does not seek to alienate, but to help those who seek God's help and desire to open up to Him, to better understand His plan of love and truth."

== Public opinion ==
According to the 2015 Eurobarometer, 24% of Lithuanians supported same-sex marriage, the fourth lowest in the European Union, alongside Slovakia, and significantly lower than the EU average of 61%. The 2019 Eurobarometer found that 30% of Lithuanians thought same-sex marriage should be allowed throughout Europe, while 63% were against.

A November 2022 opinion poll conducted by the Delfi news website showed that one in two Lithuanians supported civil unions for same-sex couples, and 70% supported civil unions for opposite-sex couples.

A GLOBSEC survey conducted in March 2023 showed that 22% of Lithuanians supported same-sex marriage, while 60% were opposed. The 2023 Eurobarometer found that 39% of Lithuanians thought same-sex marriage should be allowed throughout Europe (an increase of 15% compared to the 2015 Eurobarometer), while 55% were opposed. The survey also found that 42% of respondents thought that "there is nothing wrong in a sexual relationship between two persons of the same sex", while 53% disagreed.

== See also ==
- LGBT rights in Lithuania
- Recognition of same-sex unions in Latvia
- Recognition of same-sex unions in Europe
- Same-sex marriage in Estonia
