= Gintautas Jakštas =

Former Minister of Education, Science and Sports of Lithuania

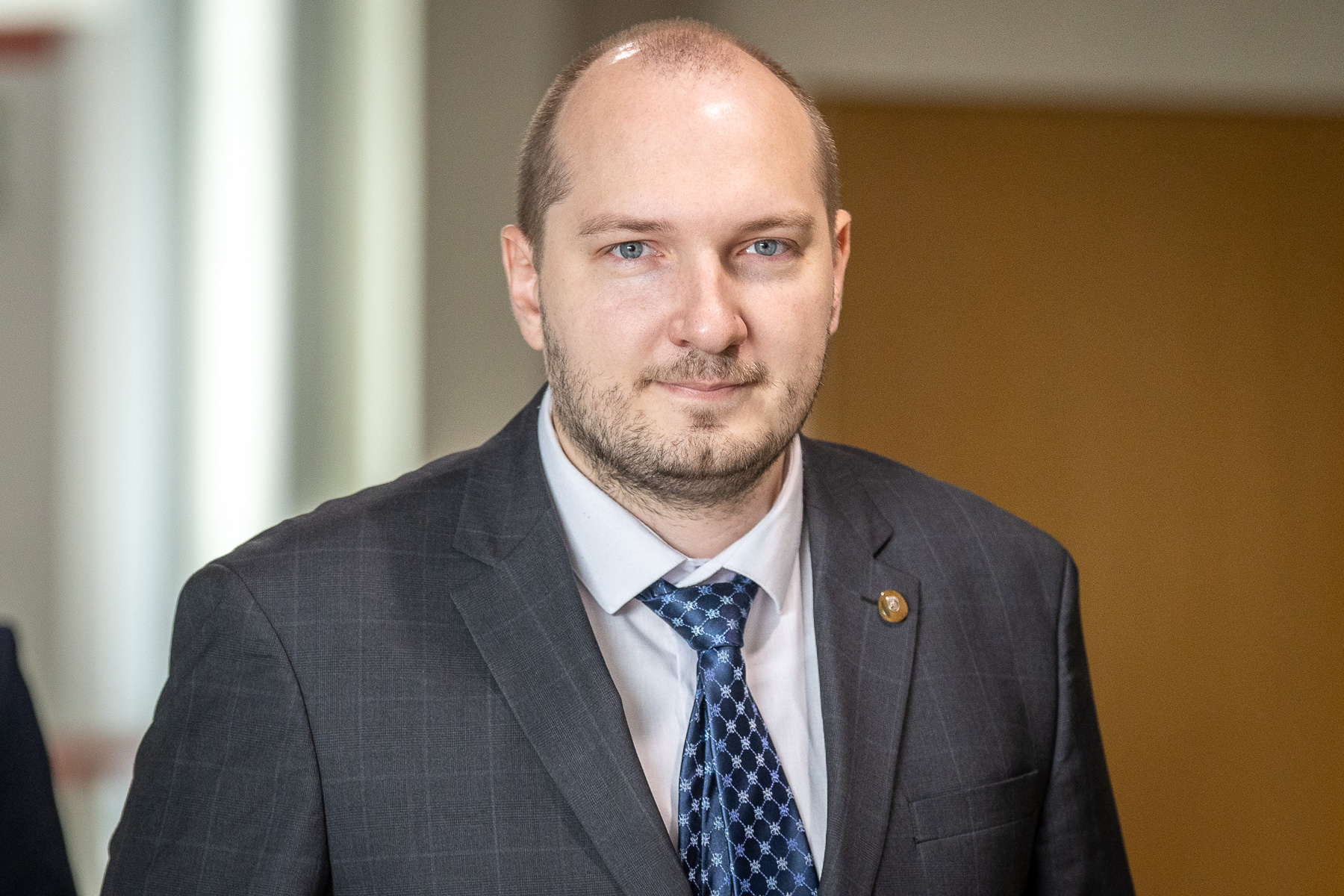
- Jakštas in 2023

Minister of Education, Science and Sports
- In office 3 July 2023 – 10 April 2024
- Preceded by: Jurgita Šiugždinienė
- Succeeded by: Radvilė Morkūnaitė-Mikulėnienė

Personal details
- Born: 28 May 1990 (age 36) Plungė, Lithuania
- Education: Vilnius University
- Occupation: Politician
- Cabinet: Šimonytė Cabinet

Gintautas Jakštas (Lithuanian: [ɡʲɪnˈtɐʊ.tɐs jɐkʃˈtɐs]; born 28 May 1990) is a Lithuanian education specialist who served as Minister of Education, Science and Sports of Lithuania from 3 July 2023 until his formal resignation on 10 April 2024.
