= Simonas Šabanovas =

Director of the National Agency for Education

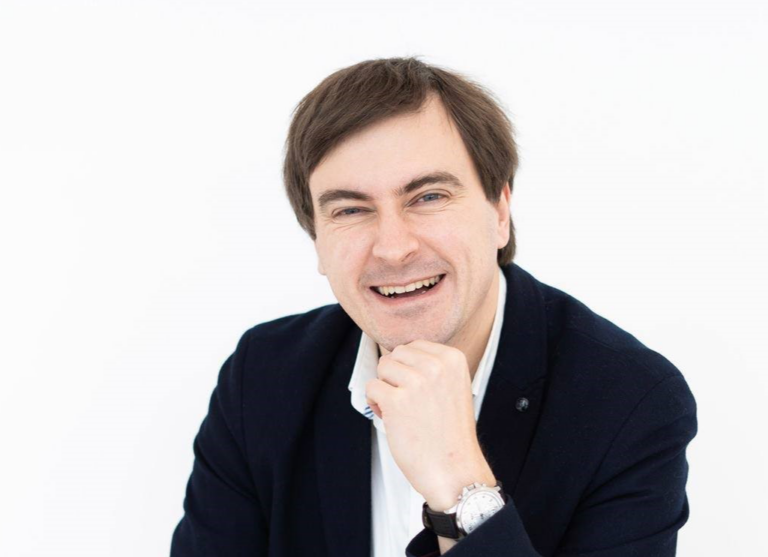
- Portrait, 2024

Chairman of the Board of Governors of the European Schools
- Incumbent
- Assumed office 19 June 2026
- Secretary-General: Andreas Beckmann
- Preceded by: Antonio Cenini

Director of the National Agency for Education
- Incumbent
- Assumed office 24 October 2024
- Minister: Raminta Popovienė
- Preceded by: Aidas Aldakauskas

Personal details
- Born: 21 November 1985 (age 40) Kaunas, Lithuania
- Education: Vilnius University
- Occupation: Teacher, director, professor

Simonas Šabanovas (Lithuanian: [ˈsɪ.mɔ.nas ʃaˈbɐ.nɔ.vas]; born 21 November 1985) is a Lithuanian educator and specialist who currently serves as Director of the National Agency for Education and Chairman of the Board of Governors of the European Schools. Previously, he worked as an adviser to the Education Department at the Ministry of Education, Science and Sport of Lithuania.

== Early life and education ==
Šabanovas was born on 21 November 1985 in Kaunas, Lithuania. He attended and completed his secondary education in 2005 at Kaunas Maironis Gymnasium. He holds multiple academic qualifications, including a Bachelor’s degree in geography, a Master’s degree in General Geography and Land Management, a pedagogy qualification, and doctoral studies in Sociology.

== Work experience ==
Simonas Šabanovas has served as the director of the National Agency for Education in Lithuania since October 2024, after being selected for the position through a competitive process and beginning his duties at the end of that month.

Before becoming the director of the National Agency for Education, Šabanovas worked for several years in the Education Department of the Ministry of Education, Science and Sport of the Republic of Lithuania, where he was an adviser focused on improving education policy and coordinating initiatives such as STEAM learning.

He has long been involved in higher education and academic research, serving as a lecturer, researcher, and project leader at Vilnius University, particularly within the Faculty of Philosophy’s Institute of Educational Sciences, teaching subjects such as educational studies and geography didactics.

In recognition of his contributions to education, Šabanovas was named Teacher of the Year in 2017, one of the highest national awards for educators, reflecting his innovative teaching and leadership in education.
