= Vytautas Šilinskas =

Lithuanian politician

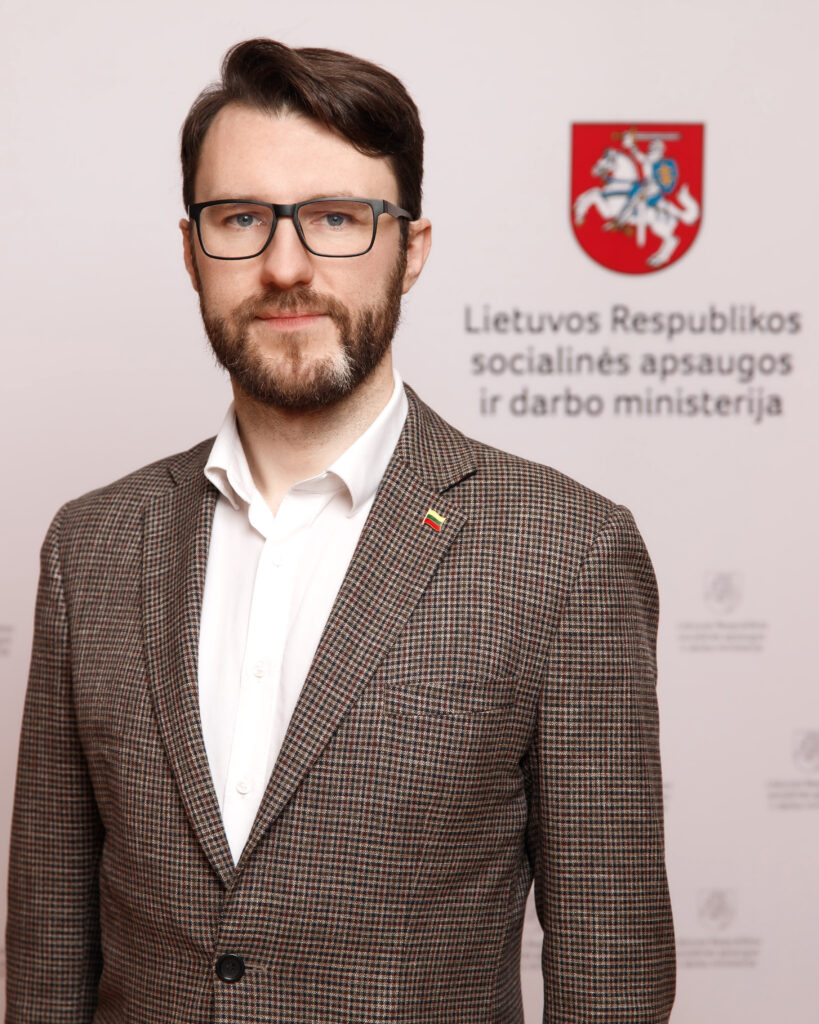
- Official Portrait, 2021

Minister of Social Security and Labour
- In office 27 June 2024 – 12 December 2024
- Prime Minister: Ingrida Šimonytė
- Preceded by: Monika Navickienė
- Succeeded by: Inga Ruginienė

Personal details
- Born: 30 December 1985 (age 40) Sugintai, Šilutė District Municipality, Lithuanian SSR, Soviet Union
- Party: Non-affiliated
- Children: 3
- Education: Vilnius University

Vytautas Šilinskas (Lithuanian: [ˈvʲiː.tɐ.ʊ.tɐs ʃɪˈlʲɪn.s.kɐs]; born 30 December 1985) is a Lithuanian lawyer, civil servant, and politician who served as Minister of Social Security and Labour of Lithuania from 2024 to 2025. Prior to his ministerial appointment, he was Vice Minister at the same ministry from 2021 to 2024. Šilinskas was formerly a partner at the law firm TGS Baltic. Since 2025, he has been the Executive Director of the Investors’ Forum.

== Early life and education ==
Vytautas Šilinskas was born in Sugintai, located in the Šilutė District Municipality. He spent his early life there, attending local schools before graduating from Šilutė Gymnasium. He later earned a Master’s degree in Law from Vilnius University. In addition, he completed an International Executive MBA at the Baltic Management Institute and pursued further studies in negotiation at Harvard Business School.

== Political career ==
Vytautas Šilinskas began his career in 2021, when he was appointed Vice Minister of Social Security and Labour under the Šimonytė government. In June 2024, following the resignation of Minister Monika Navickienė, Šilinskas was nominated and appointed as Minister of Social Security and Labour. After leaving office, he transitioned to a leadership role in the private sector as Executive Director of the Investors’ Forum.
