= Zenonas Juknevičius =

Lithuanian politician (1949–2026)

Minister of Justice
- In office 21 July 1992 – 17 December 1992
- Prime Minister: Aleksandras Abišala; Bronislovas Lubys
- Preceded by: Vytautas Pakalniškis
- Succeeded by: Jonas Prapiestis

Personal details
- Born: 10 June 1949 Valdeikiai, Pasvalys District, Lithuanian SSR, USSR (now Lithuania)
- Died: 12 May 2026 (aged 76) Vilnius, Lithuania
- Party: Sąjūdis
- Spouse: Rasa Juknevičienė
- Occupation: Lawyer, politician

Zenonas Juknevičius (10 June 1949 – 12 May 2026) was a Lithuanian lawyer and politician. In 1990 he was one of the signatories of the Act of the Re-Establishment of the State of Lithuania.

== Early life and career ==
Juknevičius was born in the village of Valdeikiai, Pasvalys District. In 1977 he graduated from the Faculty of Law of Vilnius University and obtained a lawyer's qualification. He served as a People's Judge of the Šilutė District People's Court (1977–1981), Senior Notary of the Kupiškis State Notary Office (1981–1982), Investigator of the Kupiškis District Prosecutor's Office (1982–1987), First Deputy Minister of Justice of the Republic of Lithuania (1987–1990), and Non-staff Legal Consultant of the Secretariat of the Reform Movement of Lithuania (1989–1990). He temporarily held the position of Minister of Justice of the Republic of Lithuania from 21 July 1992 to 26 November 1992.

A lawyer from 1995, he established his own law firm.

Founder and full member of TŪB “Abišala and partners”. Together with Aleksandrs Abišala, he actually carried out joint work and legal consulting activities until 1999, later becoming a formal member of TŪB (since it was required to have at least 2 full members) until May 2004.

== Personal life and death ==
Juknevičius was married to Rasa Juknevičienė, who served as Lithuania's Minister of National Defense between 2008 and 2012.

Juknevičius died in Vilnius on 12 May 2026, at the age of 76.

Political offices
Preceded by Vytautas Pakalniškis	Minister of Justice of Lithuania; 1991–1992	Succeeded by Jonas Prapiestis
