= Laurynas Šedvydis =

Lithuanian politician (born 1987)

Member of the Seimas
- Assuming office 14 November 2024
- Succeeding: Jurgita Šiugždinienė
- Constituency: Šilainiai

Personal details
- Born: 5 September 1987 (age 38)
- Party: Social Democratic Party (2020-current)
- Education: Vytautas Magnus University (BA; MA; PhD)

Laurynas Šedvydis (born 5 September 1987) is a Lithuanian historian, musician and politician of the Social Democratic Party who was elected member of the Seimas in the 2024 parliamentary election. In the Fourteenth Seimas, he was elected chairman of the Seimas Human Rights Committee.

== Biography ==
Šedvydis was born in Kaunas in 1987. He graduated with a bachelor's degree in history from Vytautas Magnus University in 2009, then a master's degree in 2011 and a doctorate in 2016 from the same university in the same subject. Since 2012, he is a lecturer in Vytautas Magnus University, and has been the author of over 10 academic articles and publications in the studies of the Grand Duchy of Lithuania.

Šedvydis is the lead vocalist of the punk rock band Gė̄døs Stüłpås, and plays the electric guitar. He is also the author or co-author of several podcasts on left-wing politics and literature.

== Political career ==
Šedvydis was appointed as the advisor to independent member of the Seimas Aušra Maldeikienė in 2016. According to Maldeikienė, "his greatest work was and is the shaping and structuring of the integration of people with disabilities into the open labour market", and cited him as the main author of the conceptual document on integration. After Maldeikienė formed the public election committee "Aušros Maldeikienės traukinys" to participate in the 2019 European Parliament election in Lithuania, Šedvydis was number 7 on the committee's list, but did not win a seat.

Afterwards, he worked in the offices of Social Democratic members of the Seimas Rasa Budbergytė and Gintautas Paluckas. Since 2020, he is a member of the Social Democratic Party.

Šedvydis ran as the Social Democratic candidate in the Šilainiai constituency in Kaunas in the 2020 Lithuanian parliamentary election, but finished fourth with 8.16 percent of the valid votes. He ran in the same constituency for the same party in the 2024 parliamentary election, but performed significantly better, entering the second round after narrowly overcoming the Dawn of Nemunas candidate Kęstutis Mazurkevičius and finishing second, and defeating the Homeland Union candidate Martynas Prievelis with 58.05 percent of the valid votes.

Šedvydis supports progressive taxation, same-sex marriage and legalization of marijuana, as well as legal recognition of transgender people and liberalization of the right to strike.
