= Ministry of Justice (Lithuania) =

Government ministry of Lithuania

- Teisingumo ministerija (in Lithuanian)

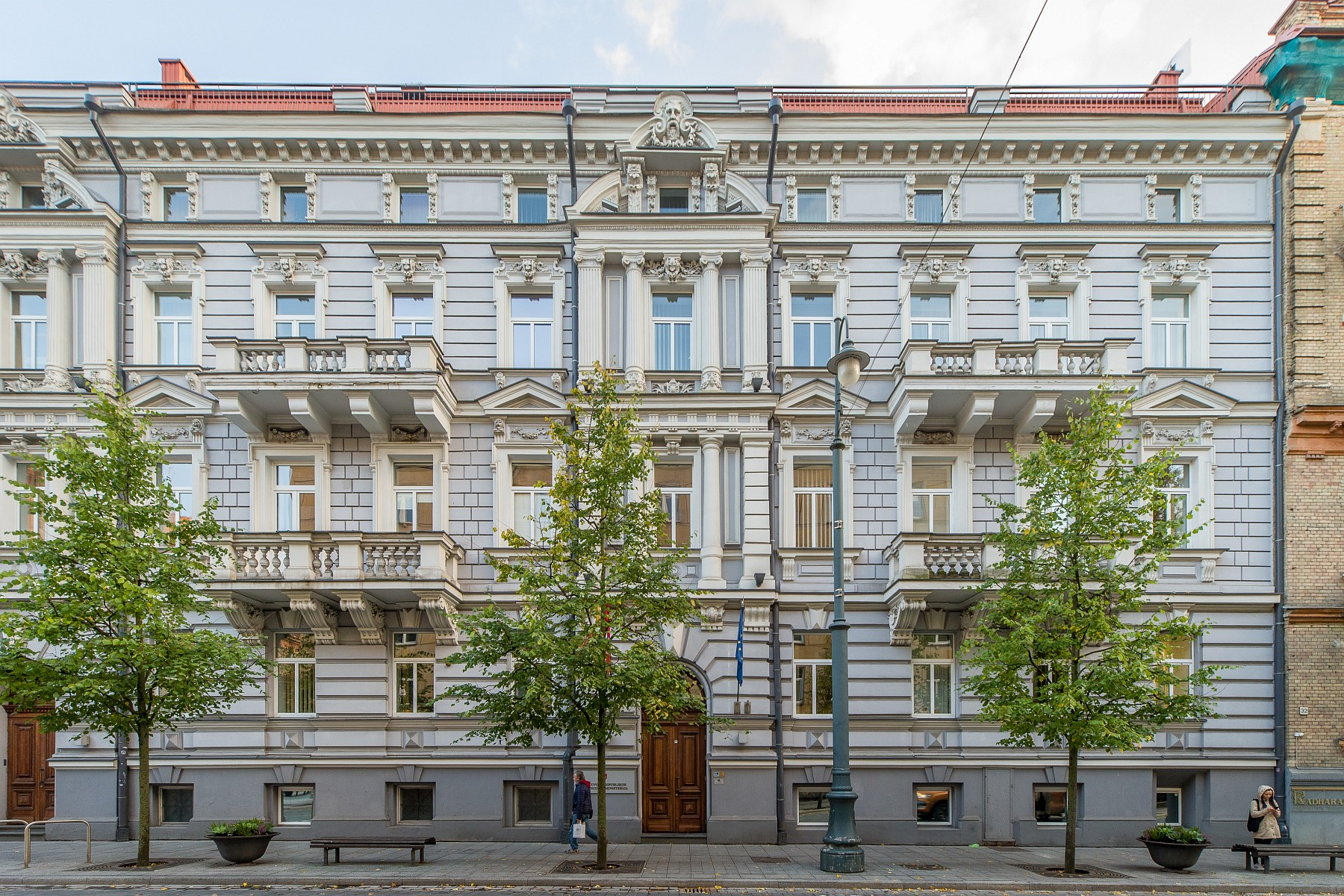

Ministry overview
- Formed: 11 November 1918; 107 years ago
- Jurisdiction: Government of Lithuania
- Headquarters: Gedimino 30, Naujamiestis, 01104 Vilnius
- Employees: 150 permanent employees (January 2021)
- Annual budget: ▲€167 million (2024)
- Minister responsible: Rita Tamašunienė, 22nd Minister for Justice of Lithuania
- Website: tm.lt

Map
- 54°41′16.8″N 25°16′28.2″E

The Ministry of Justice of the Republic of Lithuania (Lithuanian: Lietuvos Respublikos teisingumo ministerija) was established in 1918. Its departments include European Law, prisons, state-guaranteed legal aid services in several major Lithuania cities, a patent bureau, consumer rights protection, the Law Institute, the Metrology Inspectorate, state enterprise and legal information centers, and forensic science.

== History ==
The Ministry of Justice was first established on 11 November 1918. Its first minister was Petras Leonas.

== Agencies ==
The Transport Accident and Incident Investigation Division (TAAID) investigates transport disasters.

== Ministers ==
Electoral Action of Poles in Lithuania Farmers and Greens Union Freedom Party Homeland Union Labour Party Liberal Movement Social Democratic Party Independent

Ministry of Justice
Term	Minister	Party	Cabinet	Office		
Term	Minister	Party	Cabinet	Start date	End date	Time in office
1	Pranas Kūris (born 1938)	Independent	Prunskienė	23 March 1990	10 January 1991	358 days
2	Pranas Kūris (born 1938)	Independent	Šimėnas	10 January 1991	13 January 1991	3 days
3	Vytautas Pakalniškis (born 1944)	Independent	Vagnorius	13 January 1991	21 July 1992	1 year, 190 days
4	Zenonas Juknevičius (1949–2026)	Independent	Abišala	21 July 1992	17 December 1992	149 days
5	Jonas Prapiestis (born 1952)	Independent	Lubys	17 December 1992	31 March 1993	104 days
6	Jonas Prapiestis (born 1952)	Independent	Šleževičius	31 March 1993	17 March 1996	2 years, 352 days
acting	Vidmantas Žiemelis (born 1962)	Homeland Union	Stankevičius	19 March 1996	23 April 1996	35 days
8	Albertas Valys (born 1953)	Homeland Union	Stankevičius	23 April 1996	10 December 1996	231 days
9	Vytautas Pakalniškis (born 1944)	Independent	Vagnorius	10 December 1996	10 June 1999	2 years, 182 days
10	Gintaras Balčiūnas (born 1964)	Independent	Paksas	10 June 1999	11 November 1999	154 days
11	Gintaras Balčiūnas (born 1964)	Independent	Kubilius	11 November 1999	9 November 2000	364 days
12	Gintautas Bartkus (born 1966)	Independent	Paksas	9 November 2000	12 July 2001	245 days
13	Vytautas Markevičius (born 1962)	Independent	Brazauskas	12 July 2001	14 December 2004	3 years, 155 days
14	Gintautas Bužinskas (born 1960)	Labour Party	Brazauskas	14 December 2004	18 July 2006	1 year, 216 days
15	Petras Baguška (born 1956)	Independent	Kirkilas	18 July 2006	9 December 2008	2 years, 144 days
16	Remigijus Šimašius (born 1974)	Liberal Movement	Kubilius	9 December 2008	13 December 2012	4 years, 4 days
17	Juozas Bernatonis (born 1953)	Social Democratic Party	Butkevičius	13 December 2012	13 December 2016	4 years, 0 days
18	Milda Vainiutė (born 1962)	Independent	Skvernelis	13 December 2016	6 March 2018	1 year, 83 days
19	Elvinas Jankevičius (born 1976)	Farmers and Greens Union	Skvernelis	15 May 2018	11 December 2020	2 years, 210 days
20	Ewelina Dobrowolska (born 1988)	Freedom Party	Šimonytė	11 December 2020	12 December 2024	4 years, 1 day
21	Rimantas Mockus (born 1977)	Independent	Paluckas	12 December 2024	25 September 2025	287 days
22	Rita Tamašunienė (born 1973)	Electoral Action of Poles in Lithuania	Ruginienė	25 September 2025	Incumbent	318 days

== See also ==
- Justice ministry
- Lietuvos Respublikos teisingumo ministerija (Ministry of Justice of the Republic of Lithuania)
- Politics of Lithuania
