= Lithuanian Liberal Youth =

Lithuanian Liberal Youth Lietuvos liberalus jaunimas
- President: Ema Šidlauskaitė
- Founded: 12 January 1991; 35 years ago
- Headquarters: Vilnius
- Membership: 2,700+
- Ideology: Liberalism
- International affiliation: IFLRY, LYMEC
- Website: laisve.lt

Lithuanian Liberal Youth (Lithuanian: Lietuvos liberalus jaunimas, LLJ), is a political youth organization in Lithuania. It is completely independent from any political party or organization. However, some prominent members of LLJ participate in active politics as representatives of political parties.

== History ==
The organisation was unofficially established as Vilniaus liberalaus jaunimo klubas on 12 January 1991 and was officially registered on 1 December 1991. After being affiliated with Lithuanian Liberal Union until 1994, the organisation later decided to become an independent one. Even after this split many members of LLJ as Jonas Čekuolis, Gintaras Steponavičius and Aušrinė Armonaitė were elected to municipal councils and the Seimas as members of Lithuanian Liberal Union, Liberal and Centre Union and Liberal Movement.

== Past leaders ==
Liberal leaders and officials who are alumni of LLJ include:

- Current President of LiJOT Umberto Masi
- Former Member of Parliament and Minister of Economics and Innovations Aušrinė Armonaitė
- Current Member of Parliament Simonas Gentvilas
- Current Member of Parliament Simonas Kairys
- Former Member of Parliament Ieva Pakarklytė
- Former Chairman of the Liberal Movement, Mayor of Vilnius Remigijus Šimašius
- Former Minister of Science and Education, current MP Gintaras Steponavičius
- Former Chairman of the Liberal Movement, MP and Minister of Transport and Communications Eligijus Masiulis
- Councillor of Vilnius City Municipality Deimantė Rimkutė

== Structure ==
=== Executive ===
The Board is the collegial governing body of LLY and the Bureau is the LLY President's trust team, the members of which are:

- President: Ema Šidlauskaitė
- Board member: Smiltė Domeikytė
- Board member: Vilhelmas Lingaitis
- Board member: Ainaras Butkus

- Coordinator of Bureau: Samanta Tamkutė
- Coordinator of Branches: Kirill Kochanin
- Coordinator of Event Programs: Gabrielė Balionytė
- Coordinator of Public Relations: Emilija Bekerytė
- Coordinator of Events: Martynas Vyturys
- Coordinator of Education: Olivija Šarkovska
- Coordinator of Team of Office Assistants: Oksana Zukaite Davies
- Coordinator of Political Affairs: Deividas Šulmistras
- Coordinator of Finances: Emilija Roličiūtė
- Coordinator of Marketing: Augustė Anisimova
- Coordinator of Communication: Gabija Pranauskaitė
- Coordinator of Expansion: Eduardas Atraškevičius

=== Branch ===
Currently the Lithuanian Liberal Youth has 27 local sections. Every branch has a local board and organizes regular general meetings, where local board members are elected and policy is decided. Every local member has the right to vote at the local general meetings. The sections are:

- Akmenė branch (ALJO)
- Alytus branch (ALJ)
- Anykščiai branch (AnLJ)
- Druskininkai branch (DLJ)
- Elektrėnai branch (ELJ)
- Jonava branch (JLJ)
- Kaišiadorys branch (KRLJ)
- Kalvarija branch (KaLJ)
- Kaunas branch (association, KLJ)
- Kėdainiai branch (KėdLiJO)
- Kelmė branch (KelJO)
- Klaipėda branch (association, KLJO)
- Lentvaris branch (LeLiJO)
- Marijampolė branch (MLJO)
- Mažeikiai branch (association, MLJ)
- Raseiniai branch (RLJ)
- Rokiškis branch (RokLJ)
- Panevėžys branch (PLJ)
- Pilviškiai branch (PLJO)
- Šakiai branch (ŠaLJ)
- Šiauliai branch (association, ŠLJ)
- Šilutė branch (ŠLJO)
- Tauragė branch (TLJ)
- Telšiai branch (association, TLJO)
- Utena branch (association, ULJ)
- Varėna branch (VLJ)
- Vilnius branch (association, VLJO)
- Visaginas branch (ViLJ)
