= Tomas Vytautas Raskevičius =

Lithuanian politician and LGBT activist

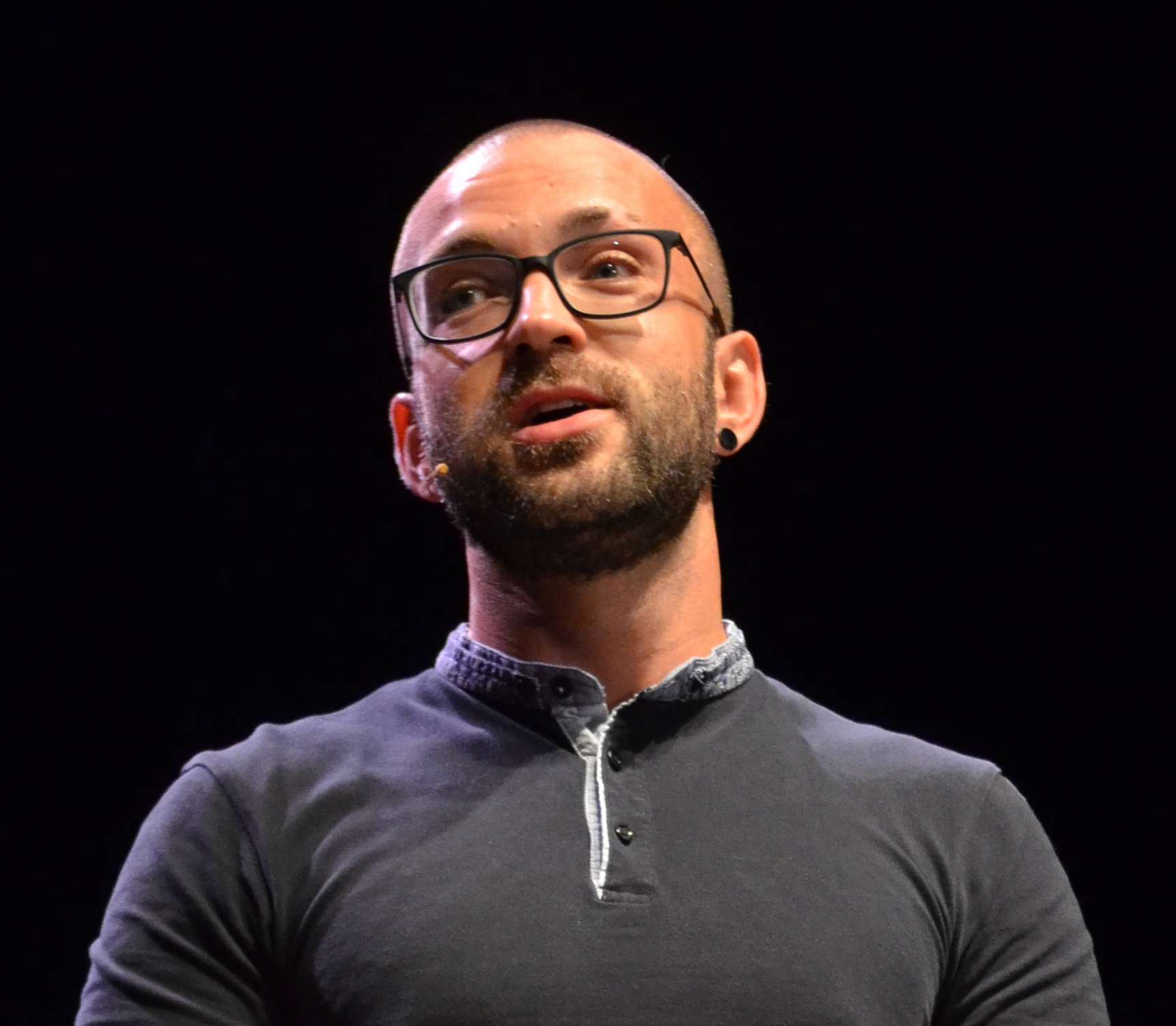
- Tomas Vytautas Raskevičius in 2018

Chairperson of the Freedom Party
- In office 30 November 2024 – 14 March 2026
- Preceded by: Aušrinė Armonaitė
- Succeeded by: Vytautas Mitalas

Member of the Seimas
- In office 13 November 2020 – 14 November 2024

Personal details
- Born: 6 January 1989 (age 37) Kaunas, Lithuania
- Party: Freedom Party
- Education: Vilnius University; Central European University

Tomas Vytautas Raskevičius (born 6 January 1989) is a Lithuanian liberal politician who became the leader of the Freedom Party (Lithuania) on 30 November 2024 and served until 14 March 2026. He is also an LGBT+ rights activist, a former member of the Seimas, and the 2nd openly homosexual member of the Seimas after the late Rokas Žilinskas.

== Biography ==
In 2007, Raskevičius graduated from Kaunas University of Technology Gymnasium. In 2011, he graduated from the Institute of International Relations and Political Science of Vilnius University with a bachelor's degree in political science. In 2012, he graduated from the Central European University in Hungary with a master's degree in human rights law.

In 2012–2013, he worked for the Lithuanian Gay League as a project manager, and in 2015–2018, he worked there as a lawyer and public policy coordinator. In 2014, he worked as an event coordinator at the LGBT+ Community Center in Brooklyn, New York, USA. In 2018–2020, he was the Head of the Equal Opportunities Integration Division in the Office of the Equal Opportunities Ombudsperson.

In March 2019, he was elected to the Vilnius City Municipality Council. In June of the same year, he participated in the founding of the Freedom Party, where he currently holds the position of Deputy Chairman of the Party Leader and a member of the Board. He ran with the party in the 2020 Lithuanian parliamentary election, in the Naujamiestis and Naujininkai electoral district and multi-member constituency, where he was elected.

Since 2020, Tomas Vytautas Raskevičius is the Chairman of the Human Rights Committee of the Seimas.

He is also actively involved in the LGBT+ movement in Lithuania, and was one of the main organizers of the Baltic Pride march "For Equality!" (2013, 2016). In addition, he initiated a strategic litigation process, after which the identity documents of transgender persons in Lithuania could be changed without mandatory medical procedures (in 2017). Raskevičius has also represented the applicants in the European Court of Human Rights in the case "Beizaras and Levickas v. Lithuania" (hate speech on the social network "Facebook").

== Political activities ==
When he ran for parliament, Tomas Vytautas Raskevičius stated in his political agenda that one of his main political goals was the adoption of the Gender-neutral civil partnership bill. The bill was registered on 21 May 2021.

During the submission stage, Seimas did not approve the draft of the Gender-neutral civil partnership bill. 63 members of parliament voted in favour of the drafted law, 58 voted against and 7 abstained. The bill was returned to the initiator for improvement.

It was planned to resubmit the Gender-neutral civil partnership bill to Seimas for consideration in the autumn session of 2021.

Raskevičius also works on the abolition of the MSM blood ban, drafting the Law on Recognition of Gender Identity to establish the principles of non-discrimination of transgender people, and removing discriminatory aspects of the Law on the Protection of Minors from the Negative Impact of Public Information.

In February 2021, a group of people called for the resignation of Raskevičius from the position of the chairman of the Seimas Human Rights Committee, claiming to have collected more than 300,000 signatures. As it turned out later, the vast majority of these signatures were fake, and the group acknowledged that their petition had no real legal force.

== Personal life ==
Tomas Vytautas Raskevičius is unmarried, because legal recognition of same-sex couples is not legalized in Lithuania. He has a son, Nathan Thomas. Raskevičius' hobbies include theater, sports, literature, and popular queer culture.

== Awards ==
He received the 2018 National Equality and Diversity Award for his work in the field of protection of human rights of LGBT+ persons.
