= Liutauras Kazlavickas =

Lithuanian politician (born 1981)

Member of the Seimas
- Incumbent
- Assumed office 14 November 2024
- Preceded by: Monika Navickienė
- Constituency: Naujoji Vilnia
- In office 16 November 2012 – 14 November 2016
- Constituency: Multi-member

Personal details
- Born: 11 April 1981 (age 45)
- Party: Homeland Union

Liutauras Kazlavickas (born 11 April 1981) is a Lithuanian politician of the Homeland Union. He has been a member of the Seimas since 2024, having previously served from 2012 to 2016. From 2019 to 2024, he was a municipal councillor of Vilnius.
