= National Agency for Education (Lithuania) =

- Nacionalinė švietimo agentūra
- Logo of the agency

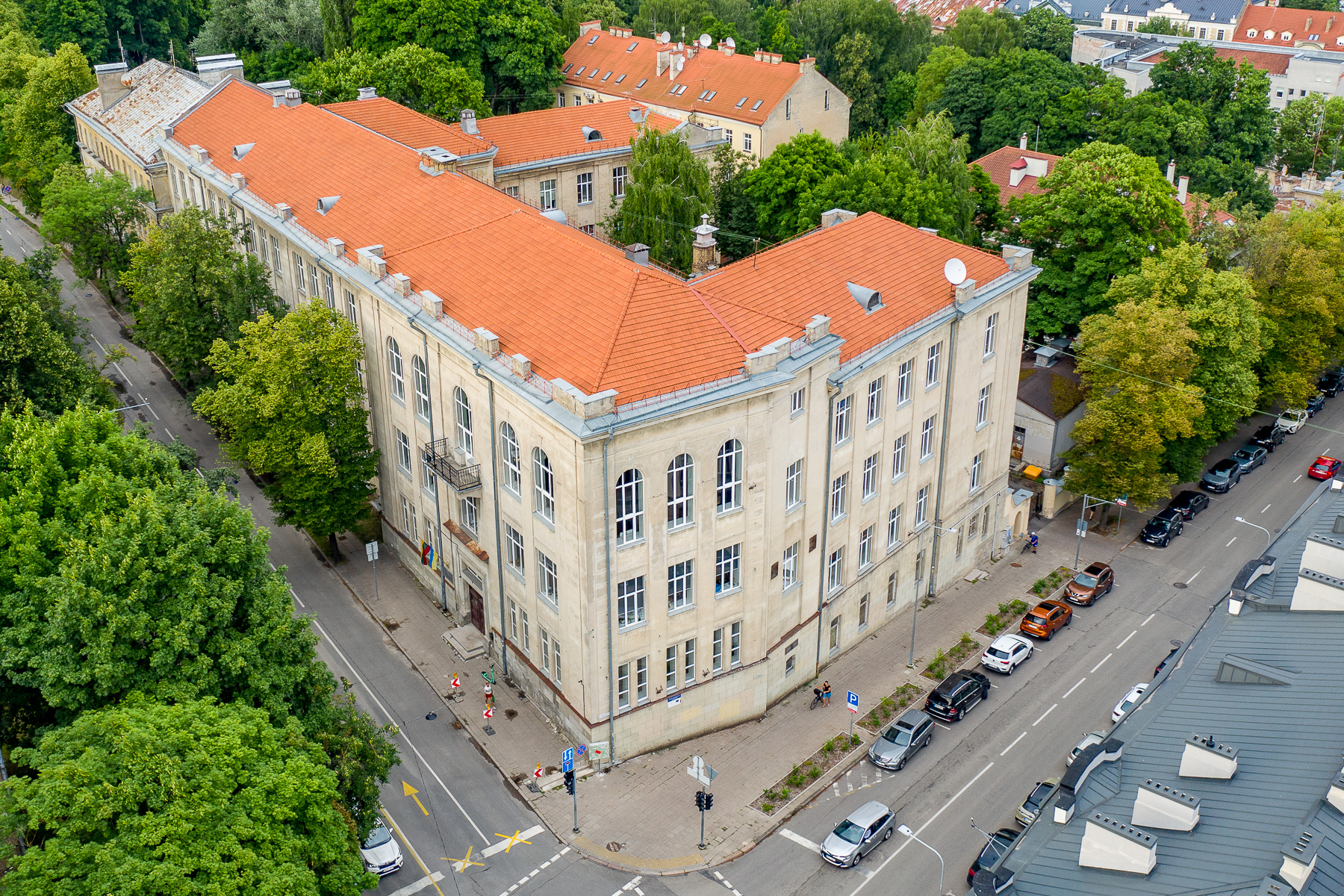
- Headquarters of the Agency

Agency overview
- Formed: 1 September 2019; 6 years ago
- Type: Executive Agency
- Jurisdiction: Republic of Lithuania
- Headquarters: Vilnius, Lithuania
- Employees: 353
- Minister responsible: Raminta Popovienė, Minister of Education, Science and Sports
- Agency executive: Simonas Šabanovas, Head of the Agency
- Website: www.nsa.smm.lt

The National Agency for Education (NAE) is a public administration body established by the Ministry of Education, Sport, and Science of the Republic of Lithuania. The Agency officially began its work on 1 September 2019, following the merger of six institutions which were National Examination Centre, National School Evaluation Agency, Centre for Special Pedagogy and Psychology, Education Supply Centre, Centre for Information Technology in Education, Centre for The Development of Education.

== History ==
The Agency was founded and began working on 1 September 2019. On 1 July 2023, the Agency's legal status was updated, transitioning from an educational support institution to a public administration body. Its expanded role includes overseeing education providers, monitoring the education system, and driving innovation in education through the creation, modeling, and implementation of new solutions.

The current agency executive and leader is Simonas Šabanovas.

== Main objectives ==
1. Ensuring equal access to quality preschool, pre-primary, and general education by implementing inclusive educational practices and managing education providers effectively.
2. Organizing professional development programs for teachers, creating a reserve of potential school leaders, and implementing strategies to ensure a steady and timely turnover of teaching staff.
3. Assessing student performance, analyzing the results, and adopting targeted measures to improve outcomes.
4. Overseeing the operations of education providers, collaborating with institutions responsible for governance, and offering support where needed.
5. Guaranteeing the legality, accessibility, and quality of data in state education registers and information systems.
6. Conducting state-level education monitoring and providing evidence-based recommendations to the Ministry of Education, Sport, and Science to help shape education policy.
7. Partnering with national and international organizations to co-develop projects and initiatives aimed at enhancing education quality.
