= Arūnas Dulkys =

Lithuanian politician

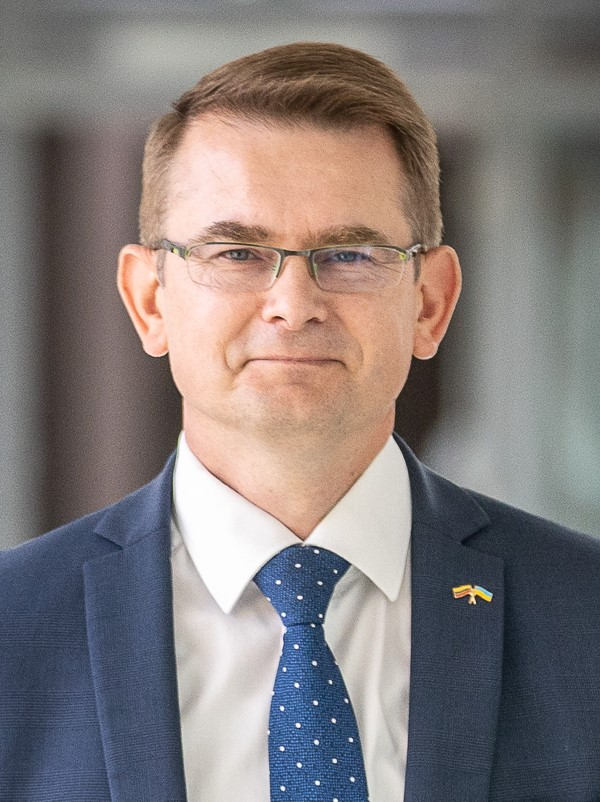
- Dulkys in 2023

26th Minister for Health
- In office 11 December 2020 – 5 August 2024
- Prime Minister: Ingrida Šimonytė
- Preceded by: Aurelijus Veryga
- Succeeded by: Aurimas Pečkauskas

Personal details
- Born: 22 October 1972 (age 53) Šilutė, Lithuanian SSR, Soviet Union
- Party: Independent
- Spouse: Dalia Dulkienė
- Children: 3
- Education: Vilnius University

Arūnas Dulkys (born 22 October 1972) is an economist, PhD in Social Sciences and former State's Auditor General.

On 7 December 2020, he was approved to be the Minister of Health in the Šimonytė Cabinet.

== Biography ==
In 1990 he graduated from a school in Raseiniai and entered the Faculty of Economics of Vilnius University, studied Finance and Credit. In 1995 he graduated from Vilnius University with the qualification of an economist.

From 1992 to 1996 at the Bank of Lithuania, he held the position of Cashier, Assistant Head, Head and Head of Commercial Bank Cash Operations units.

In 1996 he became the Director of the Cash Department of the Bank of Lithuania. He held this position until 2004. From 2004 to 2005 worked as a Consultant to the Chairman of the Board of the Bank of Lithuania.

From 2006 to 2007 was an Economic Adviser to the Speaker of the Seimas, Head of the Secretariat of the Speaker of the Seimas.

From 2006 to 2010, he further deepened his knowledge of economics in PhD studies at the Department of Theoretical Economics of Faculty of Economics of Vilnius University. His research interests were the European Economic and Monetary Union, the history of the Lithuanian national currency (litas), and globalization.

In 2007 became the Director of the newly established 8th Audit Department of the State Audit Office of the Republic of Lithuania, which is responsible for auditing the management and control system of the European Union structural assistance. He headed this department until April 14, 2015.

In 2010, he defended his doctoral dissertation at Vilnius University on the topic “Political Economy of Euro Area Development: Asymmetries and a Holistic Approach” and obtained a PhD in Social Sciences.

Between 2011 and 2015 Dulkys was also a lecturer at the Department of Theoretical Economics of Faculty of Economics of Vilnius University.

Since 2015 until 2020 he was the Auditor General of the Republic of Lithuania.

== Sources ==
- Seimas atleido Arūną Dulkį iš valstybės kontrolieriaus pareigų

== Bibliography ==
- Dulkys A., Galkus J., „Lietuvos banknotai. Lithuanian banknotes“, Vilnius, Lietuvos bankas, 2002.–243 p.
- Dulkys A., Galkus J., Sajauskas S., „Lietuvos monetos. Lithuanian coins“, Vilnius, Lietuvos bankas, 2006.–275 p.
- Kropienė R., Kropas S., Dulkys A., „The Problem of Asymmetry in Euro Area Enlargement“, Lithuanian Annual Strategic Review 2007, Vilnius, Military Academy of Lithuania, 2008, p. 125–152.
- Dulkys A., „Euro Area Enlargement: Dilemmas And Prospects“, Ekonomika, No 84, VU, 2008, p. 40–53.
- Dulkys A., „The Euro Area Enlargement: a Paradigmatic View“, Research papers, No.59, Wroclaw University of Economics, 2009, p. 119–131.
- Dulkys A., „Euro Area Enlargement: The Target Date Problem“, Ekonomika, No 88, VU, 2009, p. 7–32.
- Czaja J., Dulkys A., „The Euroization of Lithuania and Poland: A Comparison“, Ekonomika Nr. 91(3), VU, 2012.
- Čičinskas J., Dulkys A., „Financial Crisis and New Solutions in the European Union: the Case of a Small Country“, Lithuanian Annual Strategic Review 2012-2013, Vilnius, Military Academy of Lithuania, 2013, p. 119–143.
