= Kasparas Adomaitis =

Lithuanian politician

Member of the Seimas
- Incumbent
- Assumed office 13 November 2020
- Constituency: Multi-member

Personal details
- Born: 29 June 1983 (age 43) Vilnius, Lithuania
- Party: Freedom Party
- Spouse: Rūtenė Adomaitienė
- Education: Stockholm School of Economics Riga; Vilnius University

Kasparas Adomaitis (born 29 June 1983) is a Lithuanian politician and Member of the Seimas since 2020.

== Biography ==
In 2004 graduated from Stockholm School of Economics Riga and obtained a bachelor's degree in business management and economics. From 2007 to 2011 he studied in the Vilnius University and get master's degree in psychology and comparative politics.

Since 2011 until 2020 worked as Urban Analyst at Euromonitor International.

Between 2015 and 2020 was elected as Vilnius City Councillor.

From November 2020 he is Member of the Seimas. Ingrida Šimonytė originally planned to nominate Adomaitis to serve as minister of transport and communications in her cabinet, but the nomination was rejected by Gitanas Nausėda.
