= Ewelina Dobrowolska =

Lithuanian politician (born 1988)

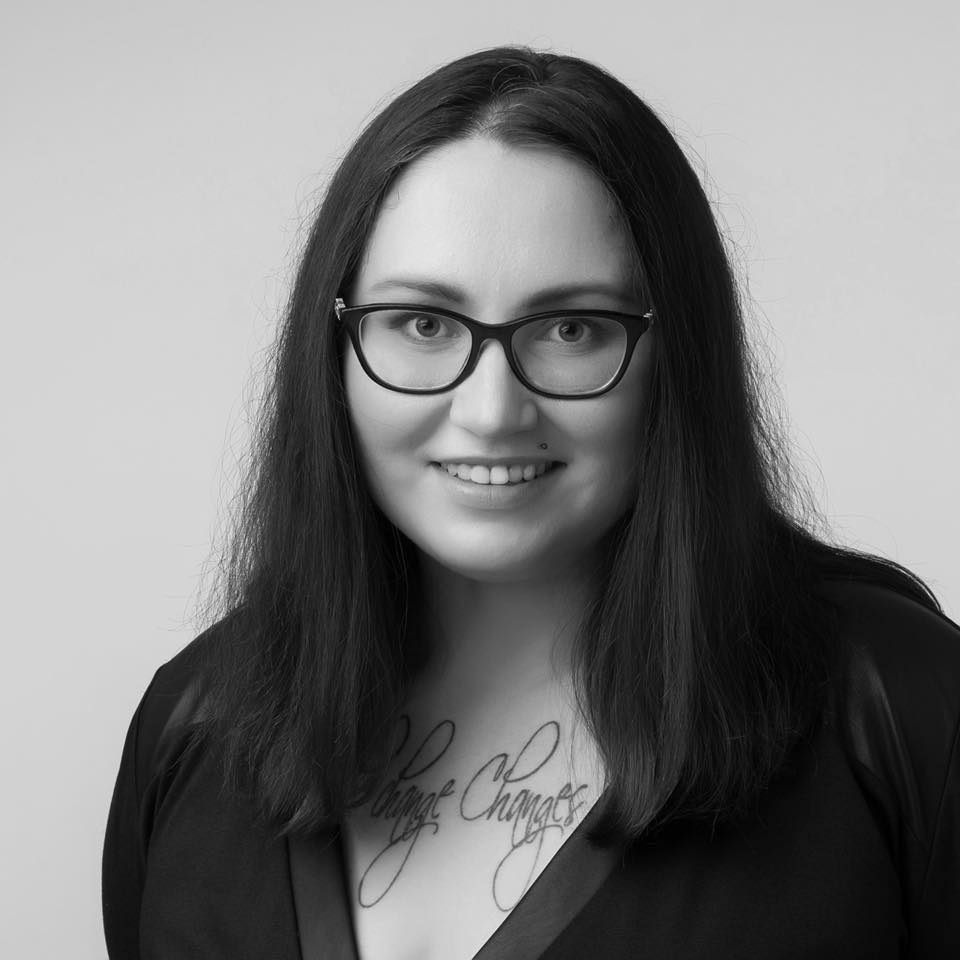
- Dobrowolska in 2020

20th Minister of Justice
- In office 11 December 2020 – 12 December 2024
- Prime Minister: Ingrida Šimonytė
- Preceded by: Elvinas Jankevičius
- Succeeded by: Rimantas Mockus

Member of Seimas
- Incumbent
- Assumed office 13 November 2020
- Constituency: Party list

Personal details
- Born: 16 August 1988 (age 38) Vilnius, Lithuanian SSR, Soviet Union
- Party: Freedom Party
- Spouse: Daniel Dobrovolskij
- Education: Mykolas Romeris University

Ewelina Dobrowolska (Lithuanian: Evelina Dobrovolska; born 16 August 1988) is a Lithuanian politician and activist. She was elected to the Seimas on behalf of the Freedom Party in 2020.

On 7 December 2020, she was appointed to serve as Minister of Justice in the Šimonytė Cabinet, succeeding Elvinas Jankevičius in that role.

== Biography ==
In 2010, she graduated BA in law from the Mykolas Romeris University and the following year she started working as an Assistant Attorney at a law firm. She became a member of the European Foundation of Human Rights. She became involved in social activities in the field of combating discrimination and protecting human rights. She represented among others numerous persons in court proceedings concerning the original spelling of surnames.

In 2019, she ran for the Vilnius City Council and she became a Councillor at the beginning of 2020. In the same year, she ran in the parliamentary elections from the list of the liberal Freedom Party. She was then elected as Member of the Seimas.

== See also ==
- Poles in Lithuania
