= Rimantas Mockus =

Lithuanian politician

Minister of Justice
- In office 12 December 2024 – 25 September 2025
- Prime Minister: Gintautas Paluckas; Rimantas Šadžius (acting)
- Preceded by: Ewelina Dobrowolska
- Succeeded by: Rita Tamašunienė

Member of the Lithuanian Bar Association Commission on Determining the Unfairness of Standard Terms and Conditions of Legal Services
- In office 2022–2024

Internal Affairs Officer
- In office 2001–2007

Personal details
- Born: 8 April 1977 (age 49) Varėna, Lithuanian SSR, Soviet Union

Rimantas Mockus is a Lithuanian lawyer and politician who served as minister of justice from 2024 to 2025. He has been practicing law since 2021.
