= Elvinas Jankevičius =

Lithuanian politician

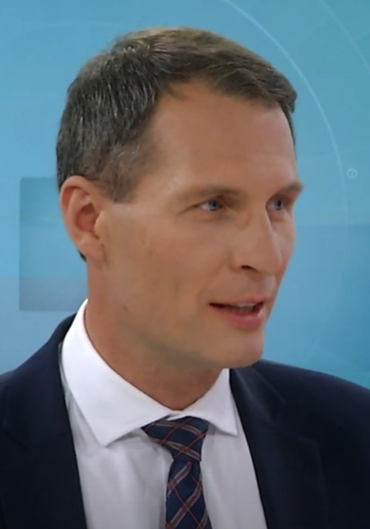
Image of Elvinas Jankevičius

Elvinas Jankevičius is a Lithuanian politician. He served as Minister of Justice in the cabinet of Prime Minister Saulius Skvernelis from 15 May 2018 to 11 December 2020.
