= Freedom Party (Lithuania) =

Lithuanian political party

Freedom Party Laisvės partija
- Abbreviation: LP
- Chairperson: Vytautas Mitalas
- Vice Chairpeople: Morgana Danielė; Romualdas Bakutis; Laura Bliujienė; Daniel Ilkevič; Rasa Račienė
- Founders: Aušrinė Armonaitė, Remigijus Šimašius and others
- Founded: 1 June 2019
- Split from: Liberal Movement
- Membership (2022): 3,313
- Ideology: Liberalism
- Political position: Centre
- European affiliation: Alliance of Liberals and Democrats for Europe
- European Parliament group: Renew Europe
- Colours: Pink Yellow
- Seimas: 0 / 141 (0%)
- European Parliament: 1 / 11 (9%)
- Municipal councils: 15 / 1,473
- Mayors: 0 / 60

Website
- laisvespartija.lt
- Politics of Lithuania; Political parties; Elections; A: It has also been described as a centre-left and as a centre-right party.

The Freedom Party (Lithuanian: Laisvės partija) is a liberal political party in Lithuania, founded on 1 June 2019 by former Liberal Movement member Aušrinė Armonaitė. She was leader from 2019 until 2024. Vytautas Mitalas has been the party's leader since 11 March 2026.

== History ==
The party has its roots in Vilnius mayor Remigijus Šimašius's list "For Vilnius, which we are proud of!", which won the Lithuanian capital's council and mayoral election. In November 2018, Aušrinė Armonaitė announced intentions to found a new party.

By the summer and autumn of 2019, the party established its branches in cities and their surrounding municipalities.

The party was accepted as a full member of the Alliance of Liberals and Democrats for Europe in October 2019. The party saw success in 2020 Lithuanian parliamentary election and obtained 11 seats. After this, the party formed a coalition with the Homeland Union and Liberal Movement and delegated three ministers - Armonaitė, Ewelina Dobrowolska and Marius Skuodis - to the Šimonytė Cabinet.

On 11 December 2021, the Freedom Party officially became a full member of the ALDE Party.

== Platform ==
The Freedom Party has been described as liberal, neoliberal, social liberal, and libertarian.

The party supports LGBT rights, the legalisation of same-sex unions in Lithuania, and has a goal to remove restrictions on the personal use of cannabis in Lithuania.

In regards to economics, the party is extremely economically liberal and advocates for policies such as cutting taxes and loosening the labour code.

The party supports European integration and recognizing the statehood of Taiwan (Republic of China) as a country separate from the People's Republic of China, and is strongly opposed to Russian aggression in Ukraine. It supports the European Green Deal.

Within the Šimonytė Cabinet, it criticized its coalition partners, namely the Homeland Union and the Liberal Movement, for insufficient adherence to progressivism, as well as their "left-wing tax policy".

== Election results ==
=== Seimas ===
Election	Leader	Votes (Note: Proportional representation votes.)	%	Seats	+/–	Government
2020	Aušrinė Armonaitė	107,057	9.45 (#5)	11 / 141	New	Coalition
2024	Aušrinė Armonaitė	55,845	4.62 (#7)	0 / 141	▼11	Extra-parliamentary

=== European Parliament ===
Election	List leader	Votes	%	Seats	+/–	EP Group
2024	Dainius Žalimas	54,797	8.10 (#4)	1 / 11	▲1	RE

== Seimas members (2020–2024) ==
Parliamentarian	Previous mandate	Current mandate from	Constituency
Artūras Žukauskas	-	2020	Nationwide
Aušrinė Armonaitė	2016	2020	Lithuanians abroad
Ewelina Dobrowolska	-	2020	Nationwide
Ieva Pakarklytė	-	2020	Nationwide
Kasparas Adomaitis	-	2020	Nationwide
Marius Matijošaitis	-	2020	Savanoriai
Monika Ošmianskienė	-	2020	Nationwide
Morgana Danielė	-	2020	Nationwide
Tomas Vytautas Raskevičius	-	2020	Nationwide
Vytautas Mitalas	-	2020	Nationwide

== See also ==
- Liberalism in Lithuania
- Lithuanian Liberal Youth
- List of political parties in Lithuania
