= Ministry of Education and Science (Lithuania) =

Government ministry of Lithuania

Ministry of Education, Science and Sport
- Lithuanian: Švietimo, mokslo ir sporto ministerija

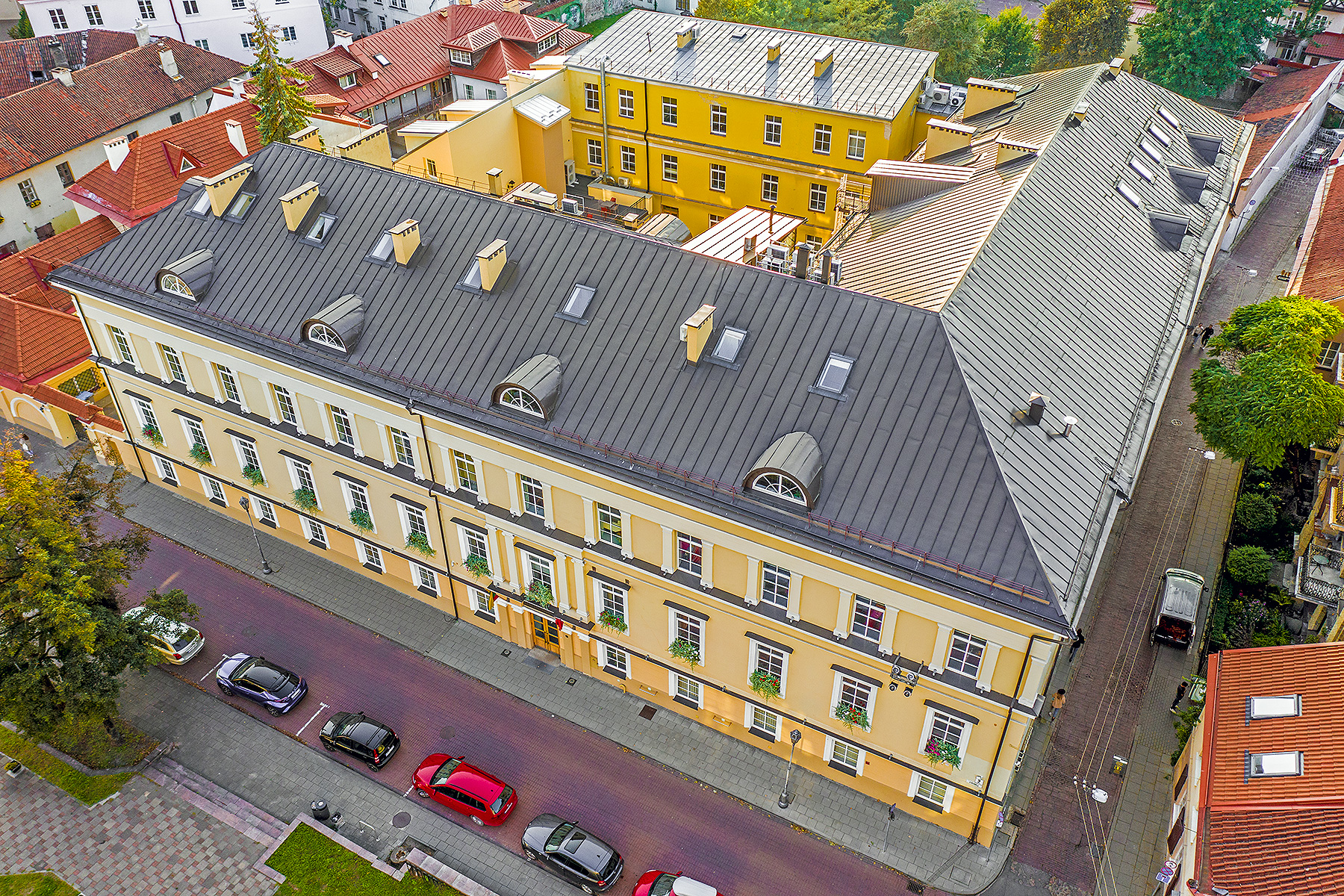
- Headquarters of the Ministry of Education

Ministry overview
- Formed: 11 November 1918; 107 years ago
- Jurisdiction: Government of Lithuania
- Headquarters: A. Volano 2/7, Senamiestis, 01118 Vilnius
- Employees: 257 permanent employees (January 2021)
- Annual budget: ▲€2.278 billion (2024)
- Minister responsible: Raminta Popovienė
- Website: smm.lt

Map
- 54°40′57.5″N 25°17′28.5″E

The Ministry of Education, Science and Sport of the Republic of Lithuania (Lithuanian: Lietuvos Respublikos švietimo, mokslo ir sporto ministerija) is a government department of the Republic of Lithuania. Its operations are authorized by the Constitution of the Republic of Lithuania, decrees issued by the President and Prime Minister, and laws passed by the Seimas (Parliament). Its mission is to prosecute state administration functions and realize state policy in education, science, studies branches.

The Ministry of Education, Sport, and Science established the National Agency for Education.

== History ==
The ministry was first established on 11 November 1918, as the Ministry of Education. Its first minister was Jonas Yčas.

== Ministers ==
Christian Democratic Party Democratic Labour Party Homeland Union Labour Party Liberal Movement New Union Social Democratic Party Independent

Ministry of Culture and Education
Term	Minister	Party	Cabinet	Office		
Term	Minister	Party	Cabinet	Start date	End date	Time in office
1	Vytautas Knašys (born 1937)	Homeland Union	Prunskienė	17 January 1990	10 January 1991	358 days
2	Darius Kuolys (born 1962)	Independent	Šimėnas	10 January 1991	13 January 1991	3 days
3	Darius Kuolys (born 1962)	Independent	Vagnorius	13 January 1991	21 July 1992	1 year, 190 days
4	Darius Kuolys (born 1962)	Independent	Abišala	21 July 1992	17 December 1992	149 days
5	Dainius Trinkūnas (1931-1996)	Democratic Labour Party	Lubys	17 December 1992	31 March 1993	104 days
Ministry of Education and Science
Term	Minister	Party	Cabinet	Office		
Term	Minister	Party	Cabinet	Start date	End date	Time in office
6	Vladislavas Domarkas (1939-2016)	Independent	Šleževičius	31 March 1993	19 March 1996	2 years, 354 days
7	Vladislavas Domarkas (1939-2016)	Independent	Stankevičius	19 March 1996	10 December 1996	266 days
8	Zigmas Zinkevičius (1925-2018)	Christian Democratic Party	Vagnorius	10 December 1996	1 May 1998	1 year, 142 days
9	Kornelijus Platelis (born 1951)	Homeland Union	Vagnorius	1 May 1998	10 June 1999	1 year, 40 days
10	Kornelijus Platelis (born 1951)	Homeland Union	Paksas	10 June 1999	11 November 1999	154 days
11	Kornelijus Platelis (born 1951)	Homeland Union	Kubilius	11 November 1999	9 November 2000	364 days
12	Algirdas Monkevičius (born 1956)	New Union	Paksas	9 November 2000	12 July 2001	245 days
13	Algirdas Monkevičius (born 1956)	New Union	Brazauskas	12 July 2001	14 December 2004	3 years, 155 days
14	Remigijus Motuzas (born 1956)	Social Democratic Party	Brazauskas	14 December 2004	18 July 2006	1 year, 216 days
15	Roma Žakaitienė (born 1956)	Social Democratic Party	Kirkilas	18 July 2006	27 May 2008	1 year, 314 days
16	Algirdas Monkevičius (born 1956)	New Union	Kirkilas	27 May 2008	9 December 2008	196 days
17	Gintaras Steponavičius (born 1967)	Liberal Movement	Kubilius	9 December 2008	13 December 2012	4 years, 4 days
18	Dainius Pavalkis (born 1960)	Labour Party	Butkevičius	13 December 2012	11 May 2015	2 years, 149 days
19	Audronė Pitrėnienė (born 1958)	Labour Party	Butkevičius	2 June 2015	13 December 2016	1 year, 194 days
Ministry of Education, Science and Sport
Term	Minister	Party	Cabinet	Office		
Term	Minister	Party	Cabinet	Start date	End date	Time in office
20	Jurgita Petrauskienė (born 1975)	Independent	Skvernelis	13 December 2016	7 December 2018	1 year, 359 days
21	Algirdas Monkevičius (born 1956)	Independent	Skvernelis	15 January 2019	11 December 2020	1 year, 331 days
22	Jurgita Šiugždinienė (born 1972)	Homeland Union	Šimonytė	11 December 2020	23 May 2023	2 years, 163 days
23	Gintautas Jakštas (born 1990)	Independent (supported by Homeland Union)	Šimonytė	4 July 2023	9 April 2024	280 days
24	Radvilė Morkūnaitė-Mikulėnienė (born 1984)	Homeland Union	Šimonytė	27 June 2024		2 years, 42 days
