= Deimantė Rimkutė =

Lithuanian politician

Vilnius City Councillor
- Incumbent
- Assumed office 24 April 2019

Personal details
- Born: 29 June 1998 (age 28) Vilnius, Lithuania
- Education: Vilnius University

Deimantė Rimkutė (born 29 June 1998) is a Lithuanian lawyer, academic, politician and a former youth activist.

== Biography ==
Rimkutė completed her master's degree in law from Vilnius University in 2022, where her thesis was awarded best thesis recognition. Since then she has been pursuing a PhD in law. In 2024, she completed a four-month traineeship at the Court of Justice of the European Union (Cabinet of Advocate General) and trained in the European Institute of Private Law at Maastricht University as a visiting researcher. Her academic interests involve law of obligations, tort law, European private law and legal philosophy.

Rimkutė became involved in politics in 2019 when she was elected to the Vilnius City Municipal Council, becoming Vilnius's youngest elected official at age 20. From 2021 to 2023, she chaired the Environment and Energy Committee. In 2023 she led the drafting of Vilnius's municipal election programme and got re-elected for a second term (2023–2027).

Between 2014 and 2020, Rimkutė held various roles in public organizations both in Lithuania and abroad. Her positions included representing the Lithuanian Pupils' Parliament at the Ministry of Education and Science (2015–2016), chairing the Vilnius Liberal Youth Organization (2016–2017), serving on the board of the Vilnius Union of Youth Organizations "Apskritas stalas" (2016–2018), representing youth organizations in the Lithuanian National Youth Council (2017–2019), and being on the board of the European Liberal Youth (2018–2020).
