= Rita Tamašunienė =

Lithuanian politician

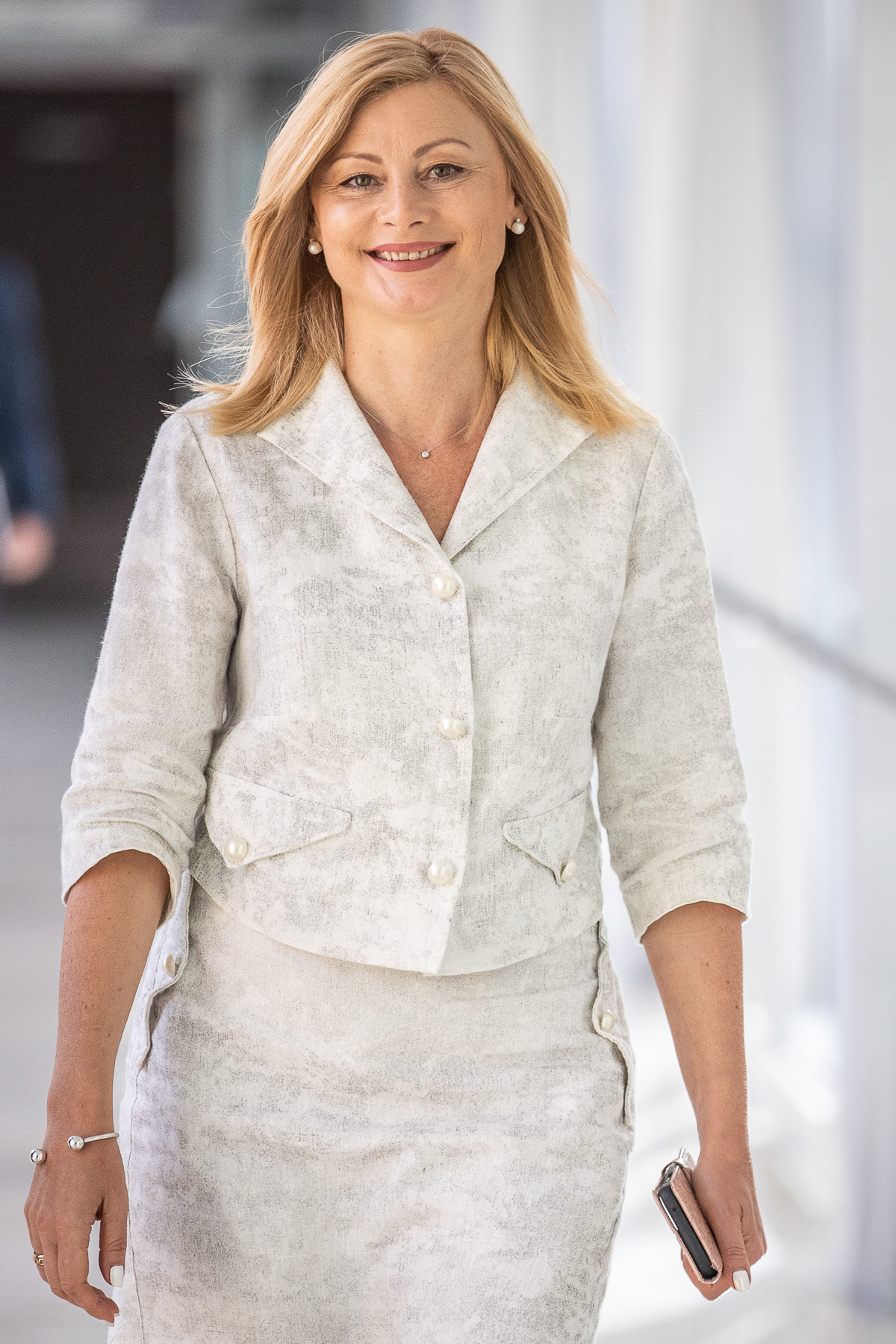
- Tamašunienė in 2023

Minister of Justice
- Incumbent
- Assumed office 25 September 2025
- Prime Minister: Inga Ruginienė; Mindaugas Sinkevičius
- Preceded by: Rimantas Mockus

Minister of Interior
- In office 7 August 2019 – 11 December 2020
- Prime Minister: Saulius Skvernelis
- Preceded by: Eimutis Misiūnas
- Succeeded by: Agnė Bilotaitė

Member of the Seimas
- Incumbent
- Assumed office 28 October 2012

Personal details
- Born: Rita Sadovska; 27 September 1973 (age 53) Maišiagala, Lithuanian SSR, Soviet Union
- Party: LLRA-KŠS (since 2008)
- Spouse: Jaroslavas Tamašunas
- Children: 1
- Education: Vytautas Magnus University Education Academy; Mykolas Romeris University
- Occupation: Teacher • Politician

Rita Tamašunienė (née Sadovska; born 27 September 1973) is a politician of the Electoral Action of Poles in Lithuania and member of the Twelfth Seimas of Lithuania. She served as Minister of the Interior from August 2019 to December 2020.

== Early life and education ==
Born on 27 September 1973 in Maišiagala of Vilnius district municipality, Rita Tamašunienė received her teacher's diploma in 1994 and a bachelor's degree in education from Lithuanian University of Educational Sciences in 2004. She also holds a master's degree in Public Administration from Mykolas Romeris University (2007).

== Career ==
Tamašunienė has been a member of the Union of Lithuanian Poles since 1998 and joined the Electoral Action of Poles in Lithuania in 2008. She has previously taught at a basic school in Karvys and has been the principal of another one in Pikeliškės. From 2007 to 2012, she was the deputy director of Administration of Vilnius District Municipality.

Following the 2012 Lithuanian parliamentary election, Tamašunienė has been a member of the Seimas, the unicameral parliament of Lithuania. During her first term she was a member of the Committee on Budget and Finance. She was re-elected in 2016 and now presides over the Commission for Ethics and Procedures. She is the chairperson of the Electoral Action of Poles in Lithuania – Christian Families Alliance Political Group in the Twelfth Seimas.
