= Marius Matijošaitis =

Lithuanian politician (born 1992)

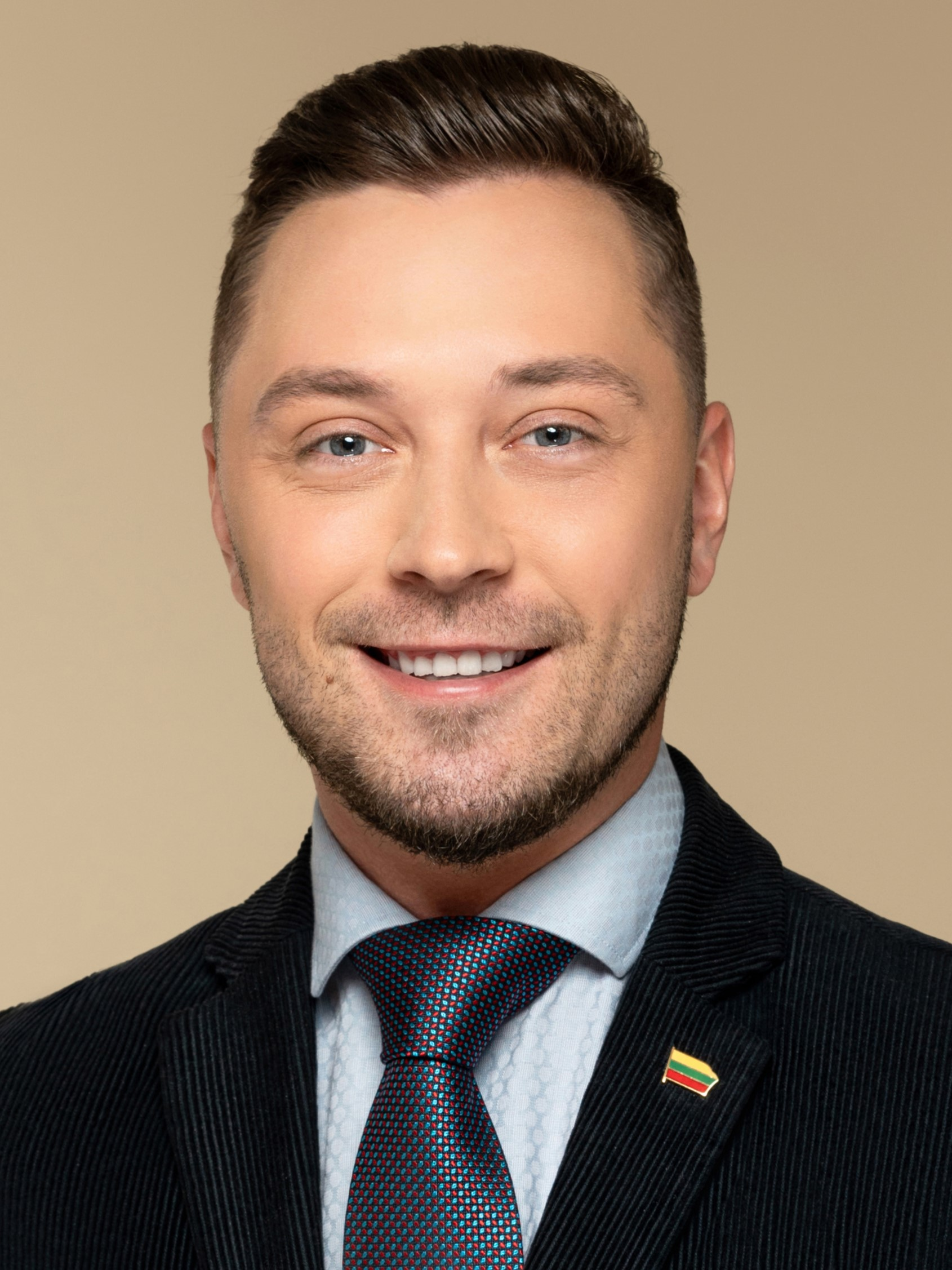
- Matijošaitis in 2024

Member of the Seimas
- Incumbent
- Assumed office 13 November 2020

Personal details
- Born: 28 August 1992 (age 33)
- Party: Freedom Party (since 2019)

Marius Matijošaitis (born 28 August 1992) is a Lithuanian politician of the Freedom Party. Since 2020, he has been a member of the Seimas. He took office as the youngest member of parliament.
