= Agnė Bilotaitė =

Lithuanian politician (born 1982)

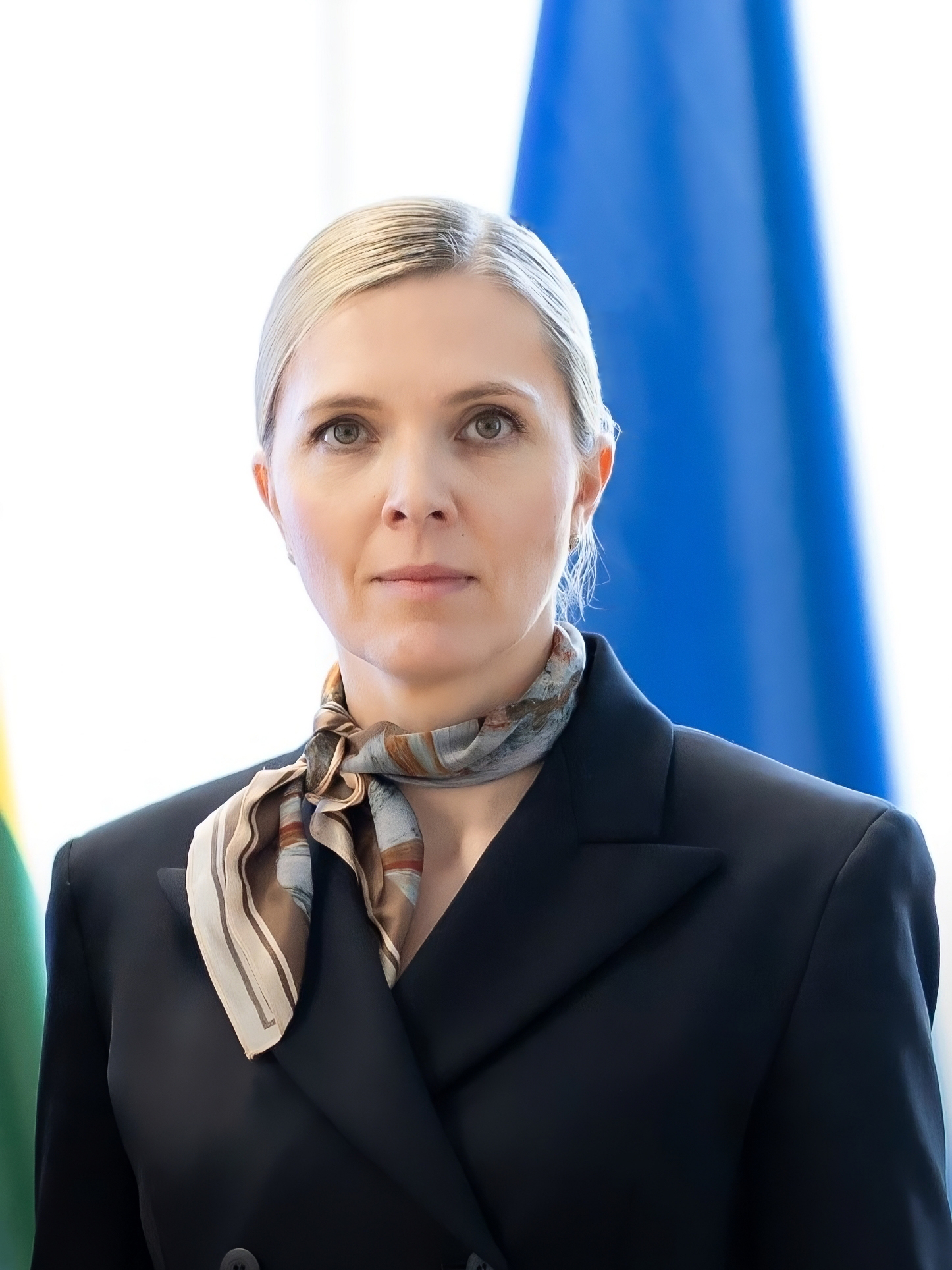
- Bilotaitė in 2024

25th Minister for the Interior
- In office 11 December 2020 – 12 December 2024
- Prime Minister: Ingrida Šimonytė
- Preceded by: Rita Tamašunienė
- Succeeded by: Vladislav Kondratovič

Member of Seimas
- In office 14 November 2024 – 14 October 2026
- Succeeded by: Kęstutis Masiulis
- Constituency: Multi-member
- In office 13 November 2020 – 13 November 2024
- Preceded by: Linas Balsys (Paneriai)
- Succeeded by: Česlav Olševski (South Vilnius constituency)
- Constituency: Paneriai - Grigiškės
- In office 17 November 2008 – 12 November 2020
- Constituency: Multi-member

Personal details
- Born: 29 January 1982 (age 44) Klaipėda, Lithuanian SSR, Soviet Union
- Party: Homeland Union
- Spouse: Gintas Petrus
- Children: 2

Agnė Bilotaitė (born 29 January 1982) is a Lithuanian politician from the Homeland Union – Lithuanian Christian Democrats group and has been member of the Seimas since 2008.

On 7 December 2020, she was approved to be the Minister of the Interior in the Šimonytė Cabinet.

== Early life and education ==
Agnė Bilotaitė was born on 29 January 1982 in Klaipėda. She received her Bachelor of Political Sciences from Klaipėda University and Master of Law from Mykolas Romeris University.

== Career ==
In 2006, Bilotaitė became the manager of Homeland Union's Western Division and was elected to the Tenth Seimas of Lithuania in 2008. She was member of the Nuclear Energy Commission and deputy chief of the Anti-Corruption Commission of the parliament. During her second term in the Eleventh Seimas, she served on the Committees on Environment Protection and State Administration and Local Authorities.

After winning the 2016 Lithuanian parliamentary election, Bilotaitė began her third term in Seimas. She is the deputy chair of Homeland Union - Lithuanian Christian Democrat Political Group in the parliament and a member of Committee on Audit and Anti-Corruption Commission.

== Personal life ==
Bilotaitė is married to Gintas Petrus. She gave birth to their son in July 2017.

Seimas
Preceded by Linas Balsys (Paneriai); Jonas Liesys (Trakai and Vievis)	Member of the Seimas for Paneriai and Grigiškės; 2020–present	Incumbent
