= Vytautas Mitalas =

Lithuanian politician (born 1989)

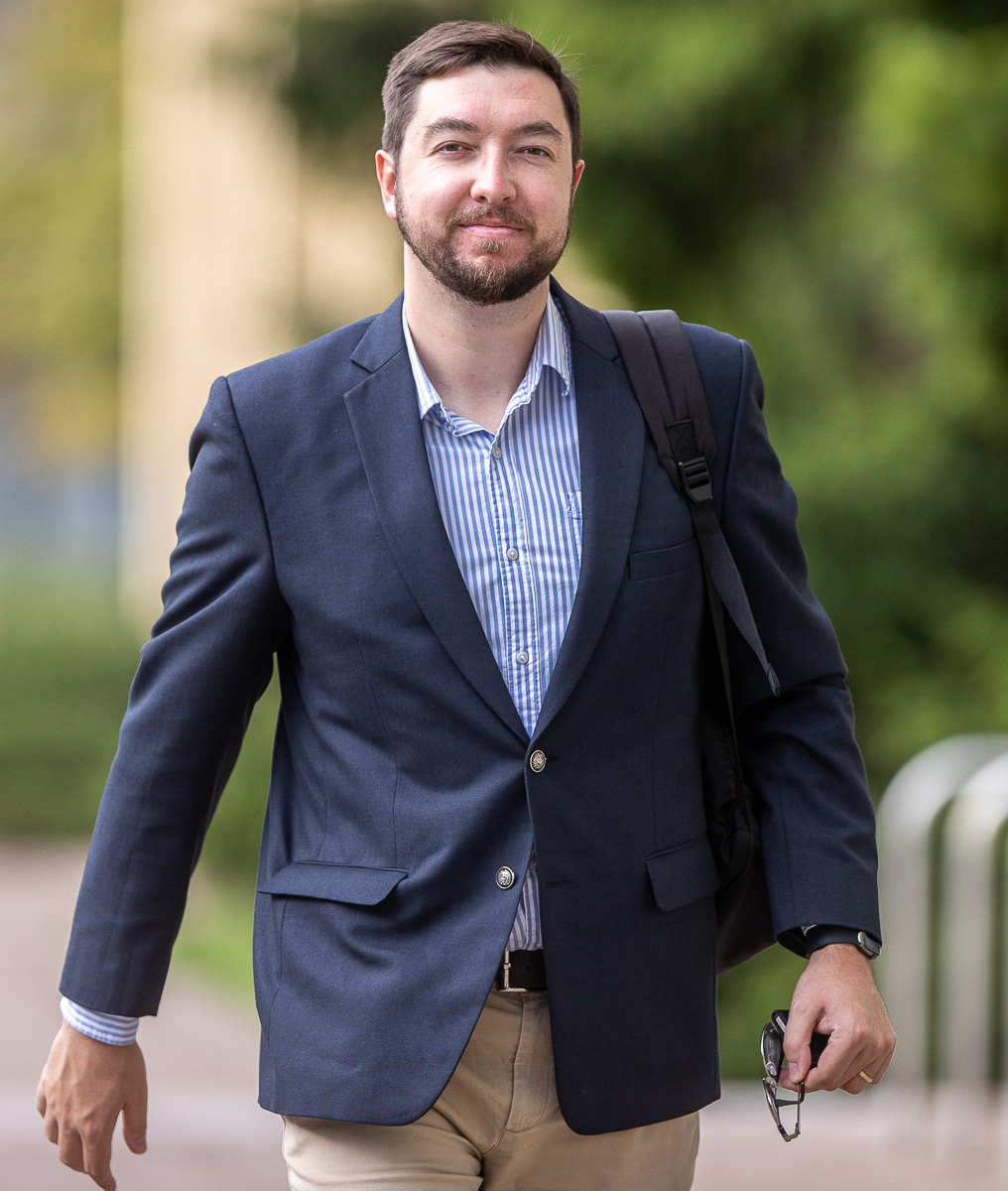
- Vytautas Mitalas in 2023

Chairperson of the Freedom Party
- Incumbent
- Assumed office 14 March 2026
- Preceded by: Tomas Vytautas Raskevičius

Deputy Speaker of the Seimas
- In office 17 November 2020 – 14 November 2024

Member of Seimas
- In office 13 November 2020 – 14 November 2024
- Constituency: Multi-member

Acting Chairperson of the Freedom Party
- In office 5 November 2024 – 30 November 2024
- Preceded by: Aušrinė Armonaitė
- Succeeded by: Tomas Vytautas Raskevičius

Personal details
- Born: 16 June 1989 (age 37) Vilnius, Lithuania
- Party: Freedom Party (2019–present); Liberal Movement (2011–2019)
- Spouse: Eglė Jasiūnaitė
- Education: Vilnius University

Vytautas Mitalas (born 16 June 1989 in Vilnius) is a Lithuanian politician, since 30 November 2024 deputy leader of Freedom Party (Lithuania), from 2020 to 2024 former Deputy Speaker of the Seimas and Member of the Seimas, from 2019 to 2020 Vice Mayor of Vilnius.

== Biography ==
He graduated with honors from Vilnius Žemyna Gymnasium.

He obtained a bachelor's degree in political science and later a master's degree in public policy analysis from the Institute of International Relations and Political Science of Vilnius University. During his studies, since 2008, he has been involved in the activities of political and non-governmental organizations.

Mitalas was the chairman of the Vilnius Liberal Youth Organization, a national member of the Youth Affairs Council, and a member of the board of the Vilnius Union of Youth Organizations "Round Table".

== Political life ==
In 2015, he was elected to the Vilnius City Municipal Council, where he became the chairman of the Committee on Culture, Education and Sports.

He worked in the secretariat of the Liberal Movement and as an expert of the Lithuanian Free Market Institute.

From 2019 to 2020 He was the vice mayor of Vilnius and was responsible for schools, economy and transport, urban development and social issues.

From 2020 to 2024 he was Member of the Seimas.
