= Monika Navickienė =

Lithuanian politician (born 1981)

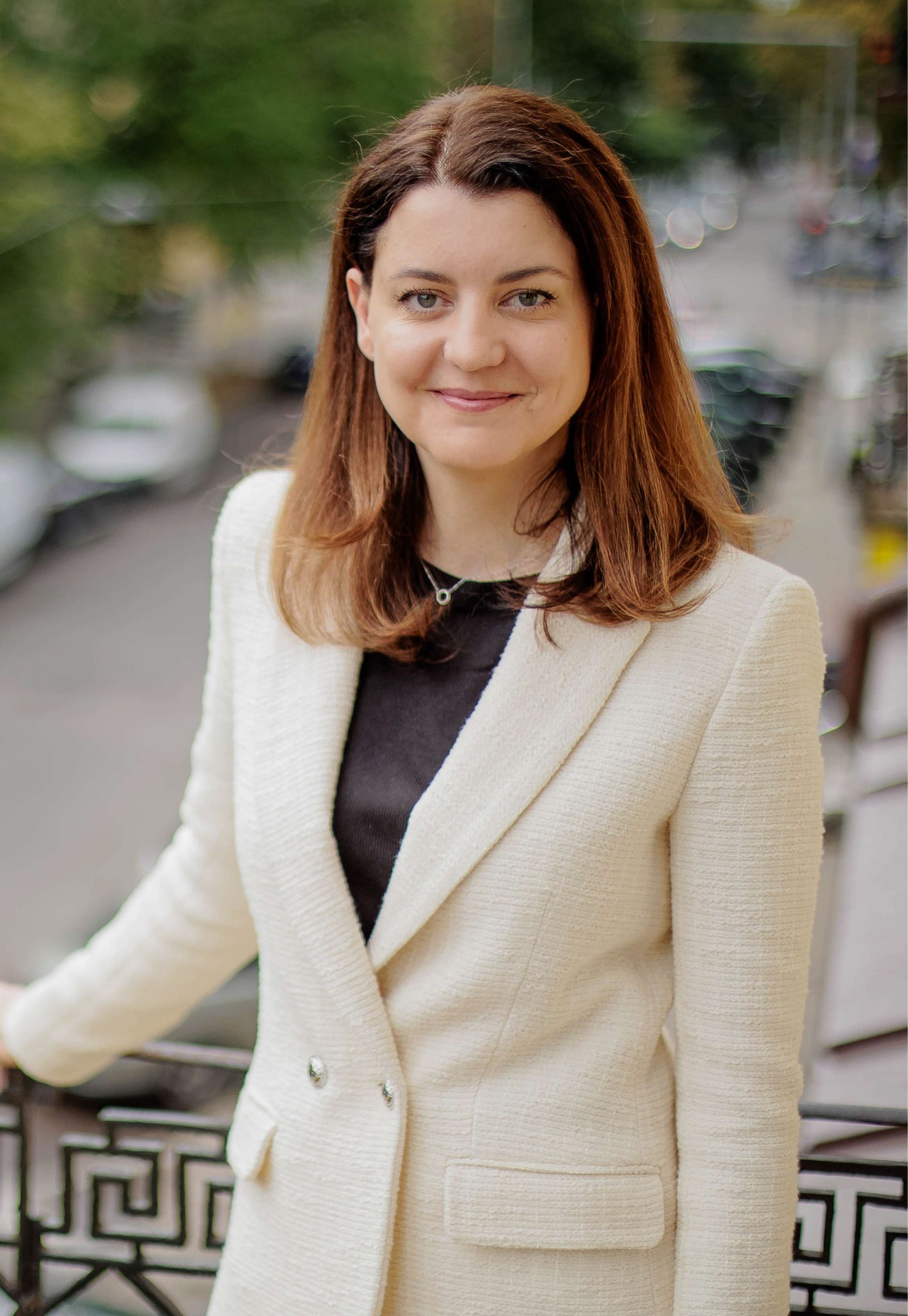
- Navickienė in 2023

21st Minister of Social Security and Labour
- In office 11 December 2020 – 13 June 2024
- Prime Minister: Ingrida Šimonytė
- Preceded by: Linas Kukuraitis
- Succeeded by: Vytautas Šilinskas

Member of the Seimas
- In office 14 November 2016 – 14 November 2024
- Preceded by: Sergej Ursul
- Succeeded by: Liutauras Kazlavickas
- Constituency: Naujoji Vilnia

Vice Chairwoman of the Homeland Union
- In office 4 March 2017 – 14 November 2024

Personal details
- Born: 25 June 1981 (age 45) Telšiai, Lithuanian SSR, Soviet Union
- Party: Homeland Union
- Spouse: Mindaugas Navickas
- Children: 2
- Education: Vilnius University; Mykolas Romeris University

Monika Navickienė (née Vitkutė, born 25 June 1981) is a Lithuanian politician, who served as a Member of the Seimas for Naujoji Vilnia constituency. She previously was an Executive Secretary of Homeland Union - Lithuanian Christian Democrats from 2013 to 2016. Former Vice Chairwoman of the Homeland Union.

On 7 December 2020, she was approved to be the Minister of Social Security and Labour in the Šimonytė Cabinet.

== Biography ==
In 2003 received a bachelor's degree in philosophy in Vilnius University. In 2005 graduated from Mykolas Romeris University. She holds a master's degree in Tax Administration.

Since 2004 to 2011 she worked in the private sector in various positions.

== Political career ==
Since 2011 Navickienė is a member of Homeland Union - Lithuanian Christian Democrats. In 2012, she was Coordinator of the Homeland Union Campaign in the elections to the Seimas of the Republic of Lithuania and Assistant of Member of the Seimas.

From 2013 to 2016 Navickienė was Executive Secretary of Homeland Union. Since 2013 she is Homeland Union - Lithuanian Christian Democrats member of the Presidium and Council.

In 2016, Seimas elections Navickienė was Homeland Union candidate for the Minister of Social Security and Labour.

Elected to the Seimas of the Republic of Lithuania in 2016 for Naujoji Vilnia constituency.

She was re-elected to the Seimas in 2020. She was nominated by Prime Minister Ingrida Šimonytė to serve as Minister of Social Security and Labour in her cabinet.

== Controversies ==
In 2022, Navickienė initiated a bill, which was already approved by the Seimas, that would reduce maternity leave payments. Since August 1, 2022, women who will decide to raise a newborn child at home for no longer than 18 months, will receive a payment size of 60% of their salary while women staying on maternity leave for 24 months will get a payment size of 45% of their salary the first year and only 25% in the second year.
