= Šimonytė Cabinet =

18th cabinet of Lithuania

- 18th Cabinet of Lithuania

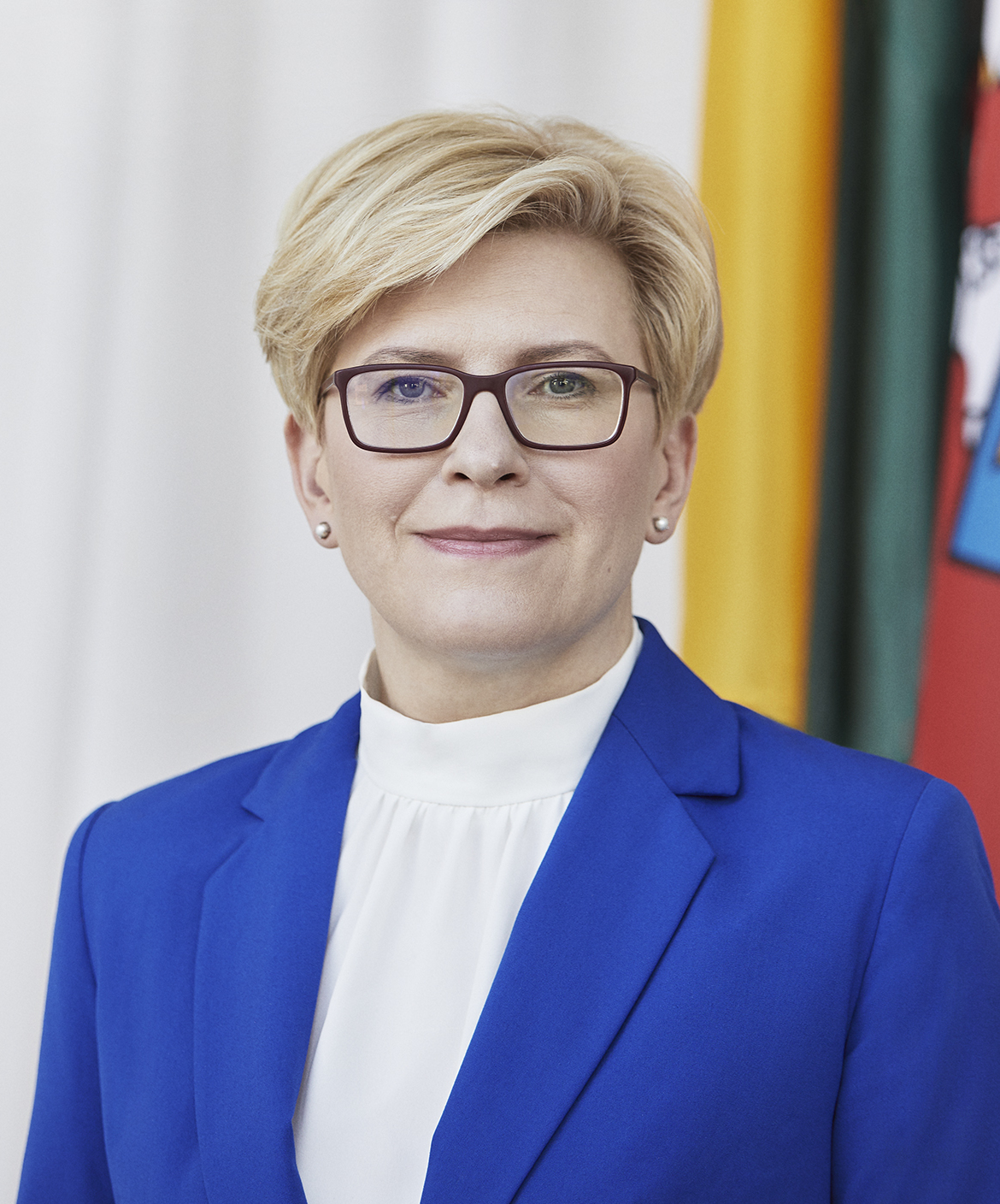
- Date formed: 11 December 2020
- Date dissolved: 12 December 2024

People and organisations
- Head of state: Gitanas Nausėda
- Head of government: Ingrida Šimonytė
- No. of ministers: 14
- Member parties: Homeland Union; Liberal Movement; Freedom Party
- Status in legislature: Majority coalition government
- Opposition cabinet: Karbauskis Cabinet
- Opposition parties: Farmers and Greens Union; Union of Democrats "For Lithuania" (2022-2024); Social Democratic Party; Labour Party; Electoral Action of Poles; Social Democratic Labour Party of Lithuania; Freedom and Justice; Lithuanian Green Party
- Opposition leader: Saulius Skvernelis (2021)

History
- Election: 2020
- Legislature term: Thirteenth Seimas
- Predecessor: Skvernelis Cabinet
- Successor: Paluckas Cabinet

The Šimonytė Cabinet was the 18th cabinet of the national government of the Republic of Lithuania. It consisted of the former Prime Minister Ingrida Šimonytė who was the Head of Government, and 14 government ministers from the Homeland Union – Lithuanian Christian Democrats, Liberal Movement of the Republic of Lithuania, and Freedom Party.

== History ==
During the night of the second round of the 2020 Lithuanian parliamentary election, once most of the results were counted, it was announced about the probable formation of the center-right coalition between Homeland Union, Liberal Movement and the Freedom Party. It was announced on November 9 that the center-right parties successfully signed a coalition agreement and the 18th cabinet of Lithuania will be led by Homeland Union nominee-Independent candidate Šimonytė.

On 24 November, Šimonytė was nominated as the Prime Minister by the Seimas and her cabinet was appointed by the president on 7 December. On 11 December, the Government program was approved, thus, the cabinet officially took office.

== Cabinet ==
On November 18, Prime Minister Ingrida Šimonytė announced her preliminary cabinet which will consist of two ministers delegated by Liberal Movement, three ministers delegated by Freedom Party and nine ministers delegated by the Homeland Union.

Almost half of the ministers, together with Šimonytė herself, are women.

Position	Name	Party	Office	
Position	Name	Party	Start date	End date
Prime Minister	Ingrida Šimonytė	Homeland Union	11 December 2020	12 December 2024
Minister for Agriculture	Kęstutis Navickas	Homeland Union	11 December 2020	5 August 2024
Minister for Agriculture	Kazys Starkevičius	Homeland Union	13 August 2024	12 December 2024
Minister for Culture	Simonas Kairys	Liberal Movement	11 December 2020	12 December 2024
Minister for Economy and Innovation	Aušrinė Armonaitė	Freedom Party	11 December 2020	12 December 2024
Minister for Education, Science and Sports	Jurgita Šiugždinienė	Homeland Union	11 December 2020	23 May 2023
Minister for Education, Science and Sports	Gintautas Jakštas	Independent (Note: Supported by the Homeland Union)	4 July 2023	10 April 2024
Minister for Education, Science and Sports	Radvilė Morkūnaitė-Mikulėnienė	Homeland Union	27 June 2024	14 November 2024
Minister for Energy	Dainius Kreivys	Homeland Union	11 December 2020	12 December 2024
Minister for Environment	Simonas Gentvilas	Liberal Movement	11 December 2020	12 December 2024
Minister for Finance	Gintarė Skaistė	Homeland Union	11 December 2020	12 December 2024
Minister for Foreign Affairs	Gabrielius Landsbergis	Homeland Union	11 December 2020	12 December 2024
Minister for Health	Arūnas Dulkys	Independent (Note: Supported by the Homeland Union)	11 December 2020	5 August 2024
Minister for Health	Aurimas Pečkauskas	Independent (Note: Supported by the Homeland Union)	13 August 2024	12 December 2024
Minister for Interior	Agnė Bilotaitė	Homeland Union	11 December 2020	12 December 2024
Minister for Justice	Ewelina Dobrowolska	Freedom Party	11 December 2020	12 December 2024
Minister for National Defence	Arvydas Anušauskas	Homeland Union	11 December 2020	25 March 2024
Minister for National Defence	Laurynas Kasčiūnas	Homeland Union	25 March 2024	12 December 2024
Minister for Social Security and Labour	Monika Navickienė	Homeland Union	11 December 2020	13 June 2024
Minister for Social Security and Labour	Vytautas Šilinskas	Independent (Note: Supported by the Homeland Union)	27 June 2024	12 December 2024
Minister for Transport and Communications	Marius Skuodis	Independent (Note: Supported by the Freedom Party)	11 December 2020	12 December 2024

== Premiership of Ingrida Šimonytė ==
=== Domestic policy ===
==== COVID-19 pandemic ====
The government of Saulius Skvernelis held its last meeting on 9 December 2020, before the new cabinet is expected to assume office on Friday. Then, PM-designate Šimonytė urged the outgoing government to step up coronavirus measures.

Šimonytė's cabinet was sworn in and started working on 11 December 2020, when the number of cases reached 3067. Two days later, restrictions were put in place.

The vaccination program began on 27 December 2020, as in the rest of the European Union. The first to receive the vaccine were healthcare professionals working with COVID-19 patients.

On 4 January, the Lithuanian government confirmed a backlog of 293 deaths that were previously unaccounted in statistics.

From 15 February, partial lifting of lockdown was made, including decision to re-open small shops and beauty salons. Later, wearing face masks no longer required outdoors.

On 17 March Health Minister Arūnas Dulkys suspended the use of vaccine produced by British-Swedish company AstraZeneca. On 18 March the European Medicines Agency said the AstraZeneca vaccine is safe. On 22 March 2021, Šimonytė, Speaker of the Seimas Viktorija Čmilytė-Nielsen, and Health Minister Arūnas Dulkys also received the same vaccine.

==== Portfolio of strategic works (projects) ====
Based on the priority works of the Government's program, the portfolio of the Prime Minister's strategic projects has been compiled. The following five strategic works (projects) have been published in the Prime Minister's portfolio of strategic works (projects) as part of the reforms of the government term:

- restructurization of the civil service;
- educational program "Millennium Schools";
- EDtech digital transformation of education;
- creation of innovation ecosystems in science centers, innovation agencies and mission-based science and business innovation programs;
- creation of a long-term care service delivery model.

The Prime Minister's portfolio of strategic works (projects) also includes the commitment of the implementation plan of the Eighteenth Government Program to prepare the State Progress Strategy "Lithuania 2050" and seven more strategic works (projects) of public management, education and strategic infrastructure:

- Review of functions and optimal network of institutions (public management system).
- Public and administrative services (including their quality assurance in the regions).
- Financial planning of the government sector is oriented towards strategic goals.
- Sustainable interaction between culture and education (inclusion of culture and creativity in education).
- An effective system for increasing resilience to threats, crisis and emergency management.
- Secure electrical energy system (synchronization of the electrical energy system with the West and the blockade of the Astravo nuclear power plant).
- Development of strategic rail and road transport connections.

=== Foreign policy ===
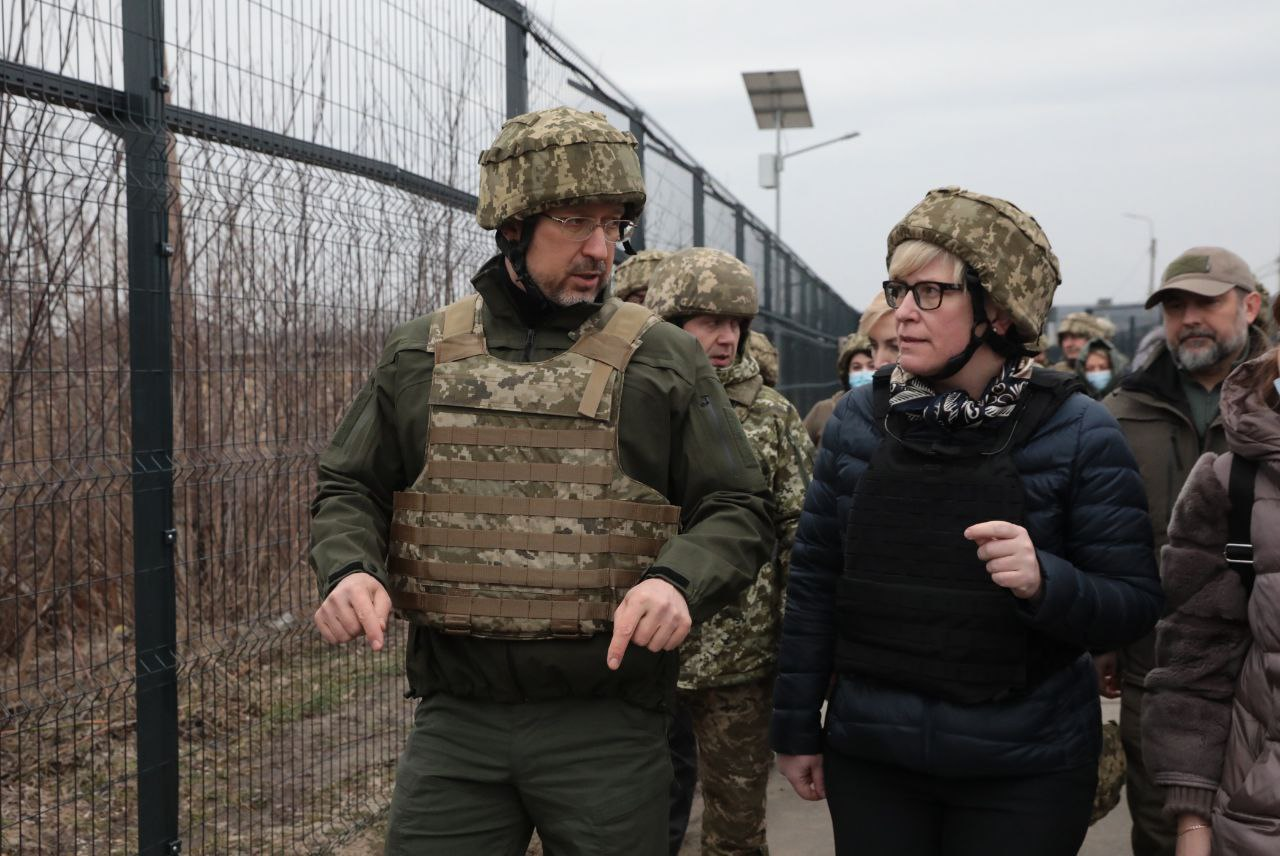
Šimonytė and Ukrainian Prime Minister Denys Shmyhal visited the Luhansk Oblast on 11 February 2022.

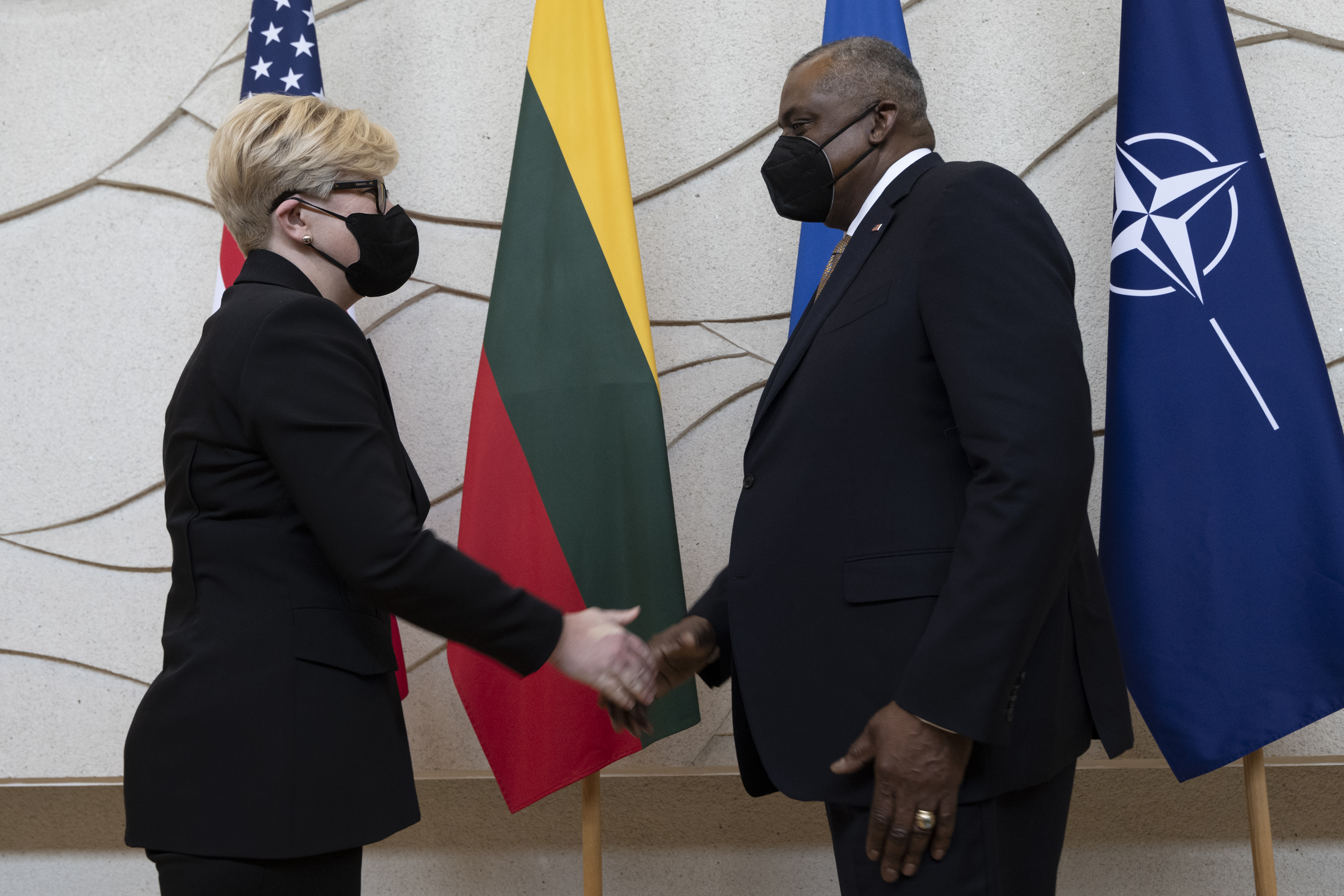
Šimonytė meets with US Secretary of Defense Lloyd Austin in February 2022

==== Baltic States ====
On 1 January 2021, Šimonytė took over the presidency of the Baltic Council of Ministers for a term of one year.

==== Belarus ====
During the meeting with Sviatlana Tsikhanouskaya, Šimonytė emphasized that Lithuania seeks to further increase pressure on the Belarusian regime. Lithuania also supports the expansion of EU sanctions. During the meeting, the prime minister said:

<...> Release of political prisoners, end of repression, and free and democratic elections are the key steps that Belarusians are demanding. Lithuania and the entire democratic world demand the same.
