= Aušrinė Armonaitė =

Lithuanian politician

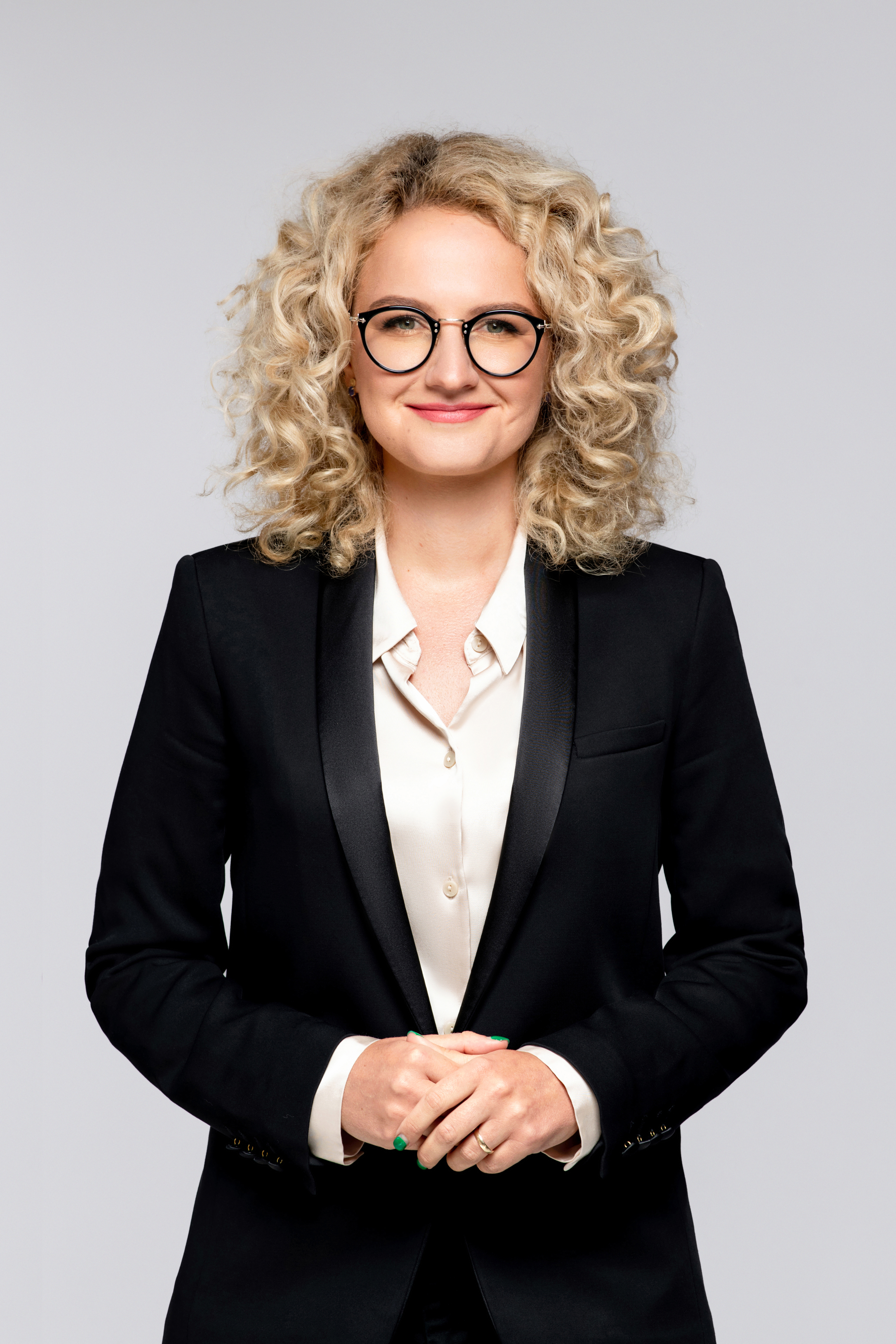
- Armonaitė in 2023

Minister of Economy and Innovation
- In office 11 December 2020 – 12 December 2024
- Prime Minister: Ingrida Šimonytė
- Preceded by: Rimantas Sinkevičius
- Succeeded by: Lukas Savickas

Chairperson of the Freedom Party
- In office 1 June 2019 – 3 November 2024
- Preceded by: Position established
- Succeeded by: Vytautas Mitalas

Vice Chairperson of the Liberal Movement
- In office 21 September 2017 – 2 November 2018
- Succeeded by: Simonas Gentvilas

Member of the Seimas
- In office 13 November 2020 – 14 November 2024
- Preceded by: Position established
- Constituency: Lithuanians abroad
- In office 14 November 2016 – 12 November 2020
- Constituency: Multi-member

Vilnius Municipal Councillor
- In office 4 March 2015 – 12 December 2016
- Succeeded by: Vytautas Mitalas

Personal details
- Born: 26 May 1989 (age 37) Vilnius, Lithuania
- Party: Freedom Party (2019–present)
- Other political affiliations: Liberal Movement (until 2018)
- Spouse: Edgaras Stanišauskas
- Education: Vilnius University (BA; MA)

Aušrinė Armonaitė (born 26 May 1989) is a Lithuanian politician who served as the chairperson of the Freedom Party from 2019 to 2024. Previously a member of the Liberal Movement and a vice chairperson from 2017 until 2018, Armonaitė was first elected to the Seimas in the 2016 parliamentary election. In 2018, she resigned from the Liberal Movement and later joined the social liberal and progressive Freedom Party. She led the party into the 2020 parliamentary election, where the party won 11 seats and became represented in the Seimas for the first time.

On 7 December 2020, she was approved to serve as Minister of Economy and Innovation in the Šimonytė Cabinet.

== Early life and education ==
Armonaitė was born in Vilnius. She enrolled in Mykolas Biržiška Gymnasium in 2004, and later graduated in 2008. As a young adult, Armonaitė was elected chairperson of the Lithuanian Liberal Youth in 2010, after first joining the organization as a teenager.

After graduating from school, Armonaitė enrolled in the Institute of International Relations and Political Science of Vilnius University, graduating with a bachelor's degree in political science in 2012. She later returned to the institution, and received a master's degree in public policy analysis in 2014.

== Political career ==
=== Early career ===
Armonaitė began her career in 2013, when she was hired as an analyst for the chamber of commerce the Lithuanian Business Confederation (ICC). She remained in this position for two years, until departing in 2015.

Armonaitė entered elected politics in 2015, after she was elected to the Vilnius municipal council for the Liberal Movement. She resigned from the municipal council in 2016, in order to enter national politics.

=== Parliamentary career ===
==== 2016–20 ====
In 2016, Armonaitė was selected to stand for election to the Seimas with the Liberal Movement in the 2016 parliamentary election. Placed on the party's nationwide list, she ultimately was elected to parliament, taking her seat on 14 November 2016. After being elected to the Seimas, Armonaitė was appointed deputy chairperson of the European affairs committee, and also served on the foreign affairs committee. In 2017, she was elected as a vice chairperson of the Liberal Movement.

In 2018, Armonaitė announced her departure from the Liberal Movement, and began to serve in parliament as an unaffiliated politician. She later joined the newly formed social liberal and progressive Freedom Party, and was elected to serve as its chairperson. Despite joining the Freedom Party, she continued to be an unaffiliated member of parliament, as the party had not won any seats in the previous election.

==== 2020–present ====
Armonaitė led the Freedom Party into an election for the first time in the 2020 parliamentary election. She stood for election in the newly created Lithuanians abroad constituency, which granted parliamentary representation to Lithuanians living outside of the country. After receiving a plurality of votes in the first round of the election, she ultimately was reelected to parliament in the second round, receiving 53.15% of the vote.

Following the certification of election results, the Freedom Party received 11 seats and it emerged that a coalition would likely be formed between the Freedom Party, Liberal Movement, and election winners Homeland Union. Proposing Ingrida Šimonytė as their prime ministerial candidate, Armonaitė was expected to be one of the three main leaders of the incoming government, in addition to Šimonytė and Liberal Movement leader Viktorija Čmilytė, following in the footsteps of the Marin Cabinet in Finland for having a woman-led government. On 9 November, the coalition agreement was signed between the Homeland Union, Liberal Movement, and Freedom Party.

=== Minister of Economy and Innovation ===
On 18 November 2020, Ingrida Šimonytė confirmed that she intended to nominate Armonaitė to serve as minister of economy and innovation in her cabinet.

== Personal life ==
Armonaitė is married to Edgaras Stanišauskas, whom she met while both were members of the Lithuanian Liberal Youth in 2009.

== Awards ==
In 2022, A. Armonaitė received the Ukrainian Peace Prize from the Ukrainian President V. Zelenskyy for her support to Ukraine through her ministerial work during Ukraine's war with Russia.

Seimas
Preceded by Žygimantas Pavilionis (Naujamiestis)	Member of the Seimas for Lithuanian diaspora 2020–2024	Succeeded by Dalia Asanavičiūtė
