= Jurgita Šiugždinienė =

Lithuanian politician

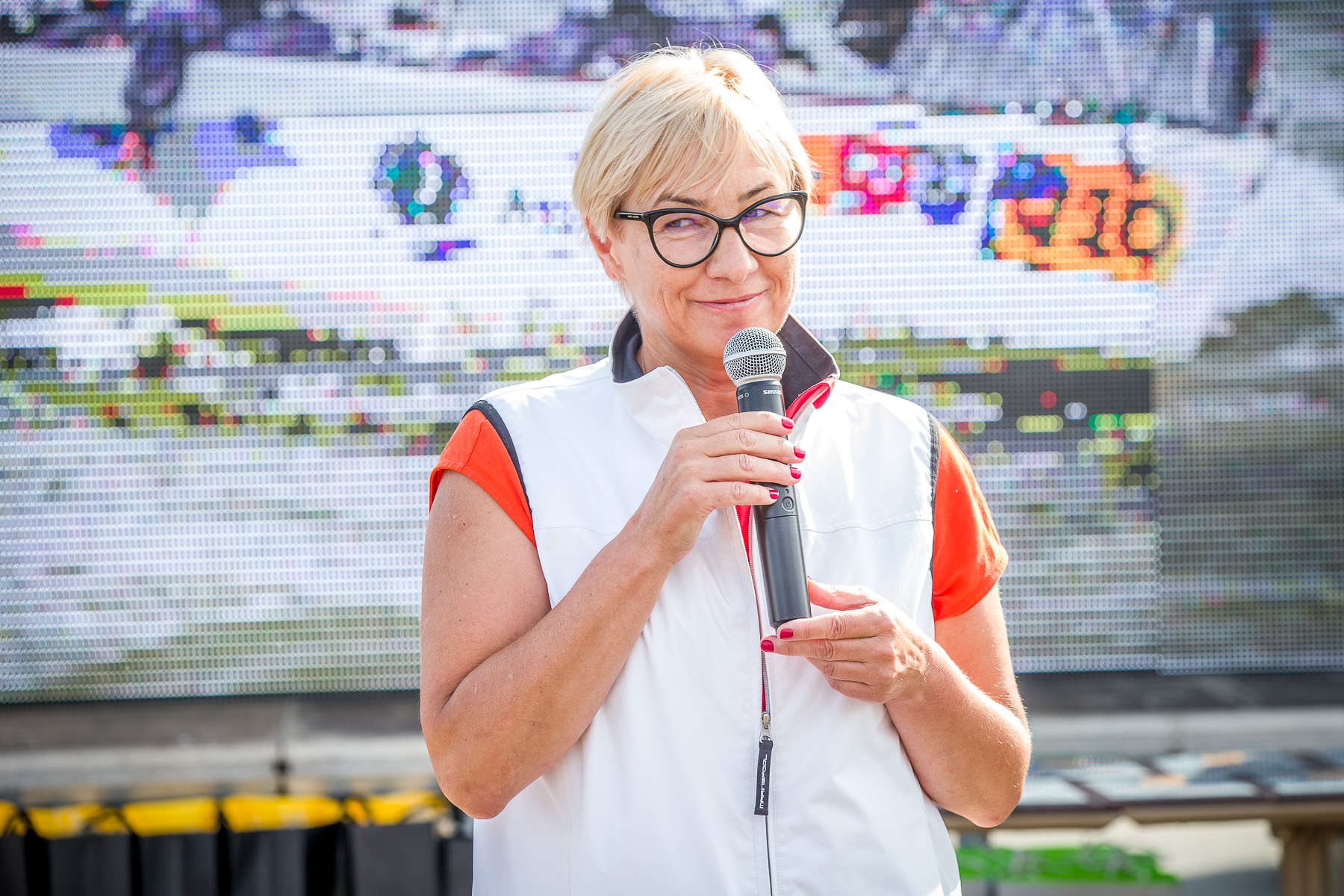
- Šiugždinienė in 2021

Minister of Education, Science and Sports
- In office 11 December 2020 – 23 May 2023
- Prime Minister: Ingrida Šimonytė
- Preceded by: Algirdas Monkevičius
- Succeeded by: Gintautas Jakštas

Member of the Seimas
- In office 13 November 2020 – 14 November 2024
- Preceded by: Ramūnas Karbauskis
- Succeeded by: Laurynas Šedvydis
- Constituency: Šilainiai

Personal details
- Born: 1 March 1972 (age 54) Kaunas, Lithuania
- Party: Homeland Union
- Spouse: Raimondas Šiugždinis
- Children: 2
- Education: Kaunas University of Technology

Jurgita Šiugždinienė (born 1 March 1972) is a Lithuanian politician, a former Member of the Seimas for Šilainiai constituency, Minister of Education, Science and Sports and former Kaunas City Councillor.

On 7 December 2020, she was approved to be the Minister of Education, Science and Sports in the Šimonytė Cabinet.

== Biography ==
Šiugždinienė studied in Kaunas University of Technology. She holds master's degree in Public Administration (1996) and PhD in Social Sciences (2008).

From 2008 to 2020 Šiugždinienė worked as an Associate Professor in Kaunas University of Technology in the Faculty of Social Sciences, Humanities and Arts. From 2013 to 2015, she was the Dean of this faculty. From 2015 until 2017, Šiugždinienė was Kaunas University of Technology Vice-Rector for Studies. Between 2017 and 2018 she held a position as the acting Rector of Kaunas University of Technology. Since 2018 she has been Head of the Strategic Group of the Homeland Union Secretariat. From 2019 to 2020 she was a member of Kaunas City Municipality Council.

Šiugždinienė was elected as Member of the Seimas for Šilainiai constituency in October 2020. In December 2020 she became Minister of Education, Science and Sports. She resigned in the role as minister in 2023 after a cheque scandal, which arose due to transparency of the use of funds allocated to members of municipal councils. After leaving, she did not run in the 2024 Lithuanian parliamentary election. Instead, she started leading the EU4Belarus programme, which is controlled by the Central Project Management Agency, which helps the Belarusian diaspora who fled the country settle.

Seimas
Preceded by Ramūnas Karbauskis	Member of the Seimas for Šilainiai; 2020–present	Incumbent
