= Vilnius Court of Commercial Arbitration =

The Vilnius Court of Commercial Arbitration (lit. Vilniaus komercinio arbitražo teismas; abrev. VCCA or VKAT) is a permanent arbitration institution administering cases of commercial arbitration, established in Vilnius, Lithuania. Vilnius Court of Commercial Arbitration – is an attractive alternative to solve both national and international commercial disputes in a confidential way.

Address: Žalgirio 92, 09303 Vilnius, Lithuania.

== History ==
The Court was established as a result of the reorganization of the two arbitration institutions. At the end of October 2003, the two main Lithuanian permanent arbitration institutions – the Arbitration Court at the Association International Chamber of Commerce Lithuania and the Vilnius International Commercial Arbitration were merged into one institution, the Vilnius Court of Commercial Arbitration (VCCA).

== Head ==
- Vitalija Baranovienė (since 2021)
- Prof. dr. Vytautas Nekrošius (until 2021)
