= Litgrid =

Lithuanian electricity transmission system operator

Litgrid AB

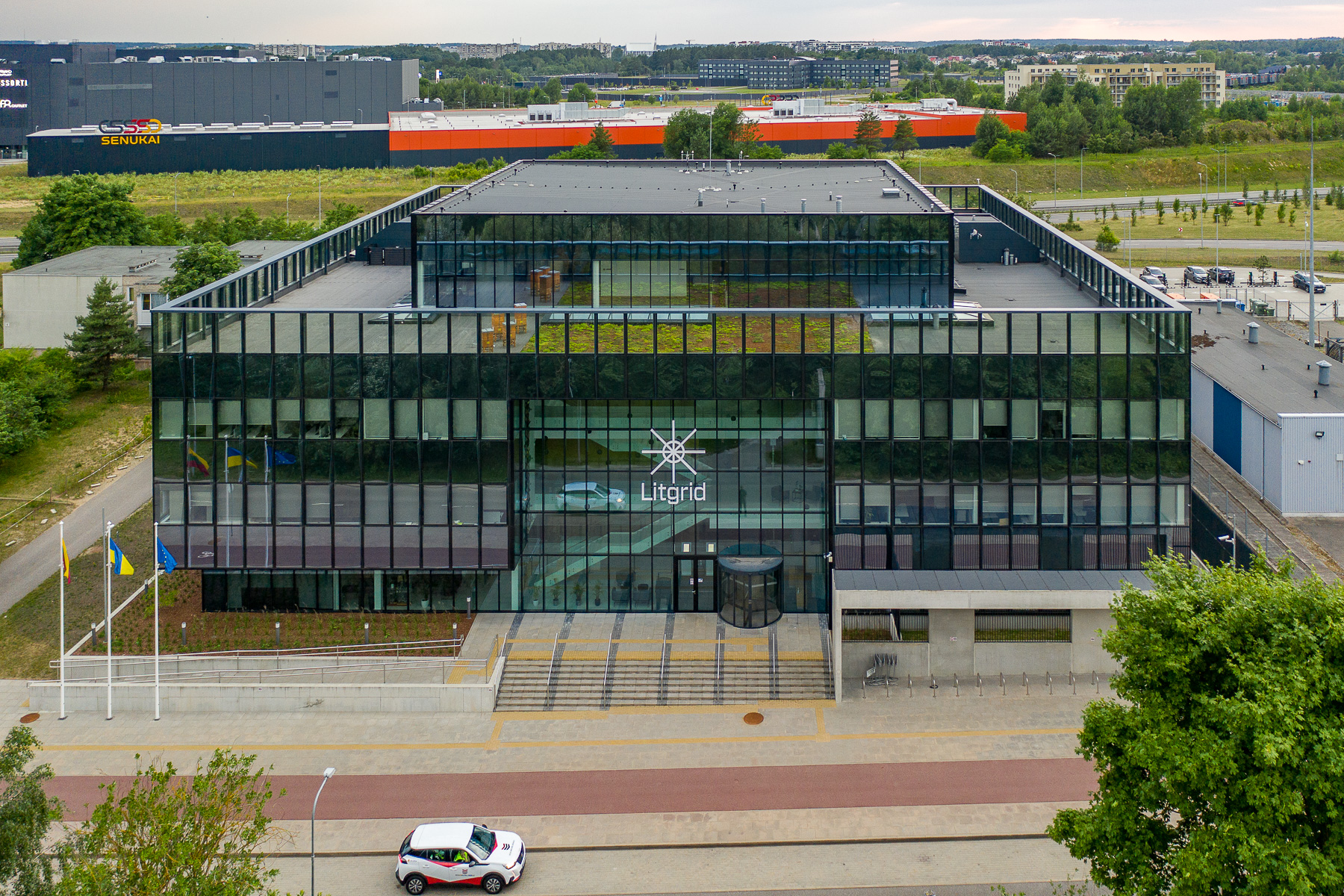
- Litgrid office in Vilnius
- Type: Government-owned company
- Traded as: Nasdaq Baltic: LGD1L
- ISIN: LT0000128415
- Industry: Electricity
- Founded: 2010
- Headquarters: Vilnius, Lithuania
- Area served: Lithuania
- Key people: Rokas Masiulis (CEO)
- Services: Electric power transmission
- Revenue: ▼€370 million (2023)
- Operating income: ▲€41 million (2023)
- Net income: ▲€48 million (2023)
- Total assets: ▼€264 million (2023)
- Total equity: ▲€239 million (2023)
- Owner: Government of Lithuania (97.5%)
- Number of employees: 421 (2023)
- Parent: Ministry of Energy
- Website: litgrid.eu

Litgrid AB is a Lithuanian electricity transmission system operator that operates Lithuania's electricity transmission grid. Litgrid is responsible for the integration of the Lithuanian electricity system into the European electricity infrastructure and the common electricity market.

Litgrid has completed the strategic international connection projects NordBalt (Lithuania-Sweden) and LitPol Link (Lithuania-Poland), and currently it is implementing Lithuania's strategic objective of reorienting its power system for synchronous operation with the continental European power grid. The company has over 300 employees.

As from 2010, the companies shares are listed on the NASDAQ OMX Vilnius stock exchange. 97.5% of Litgrid's shares are owned by EPSO-G UAB which is directly controlled by the Ministry of Energy of the Republic of Lithuania.

== History ==
The company was founded in 2010, after the reorganisation of the Lithuanian energy sector in accordance with the requirements of the EU's third energy package. The third energy package, approved in the European Union in 2009, stipulates the requirement to separate the transmission and production from grid ownership in the electricity and gas sectors. During 2010–2011, Litgrid took over the ownership and maintenance of the electricity transmission grid from Lietuvos energija (currently – Ignitis group), while the latter company remained the owner of the largest power plants in the country.

As from 1 October 2012, the company is fully separated from the companies that control electricity production, supply and distribution. The company is directly responsible for the implementation of 14 synchronisation projects of special national importance as approved by the Government.

== Operations ==
According to the data of 2021, the company owns 7,000 km of overhead lines, over 200 transformer substations and 17 inter-system lines connecting to other countries, constantly maintaining them to ensure appropriate electricity transmission for all residents, institutions and other organisations in the country. The Lithuanian transmission networks have four 330 kV power line connections with the Latvian, four connections with the Belarusian and three connections with the Russian (Kaliningrad) energy systems.

== Key projects ==
The LitPol Link started its operations in 2015. It was the first connection between the Baltic and Western European electricity infrastructures. This high-capacity connection (400 kV power transmission line) with Poland enables synchronous operation with the energy systems of other European countries and the development of the common European electricity market. Litgrid constructed the LitPol Link in cooperation with the Polish power grid operator PSE. Implementation of this strategic project required an extensive technical design work, while the construction itself was carried out during 2014–2015. In addition, 11 other smaller-scale network projects were completed.

The purpose of the NordBalt project was to lay an inter-system power connection between the Lithuanian and Swedish power transmission systems. The connection's length is around 450 km, while its capacity is 700 MW. This connection is made of underwater and underground high-voltage DC cables and converter stations in Lithuania and Sweden. NordBalt started its operation in 2015. This connection between Lithuania and Sweden ensures more diversity in the supply of electricity, which reduced the price of electricity by 30% in the first year of its operation. Litgrid completed the strategic electricity project in collaboration with the Swedish power transmission system operator Svenska kraftnät.

Harmony Link is a planned high-voltage direct current (HVDC) connection between Lithuania and Poland. It total length is almost 330 kilometres (210 mi), while its capacity is 700 MW. The connection goes both underwater and underground. It will connect the Żarnowiec substation in the Polish Pomerania region with a newly built 330 kV Darbėnai switching station in the Lithuanian Kretinga region. The Harmony Link project will increase the capacity of the link with the European grid. The political agreement on the synchronisation of the Baltic electricity grids and the continental European grid was signed by the President of the European Commission and the Lithuanian, Latvian, Estonian and Polish heads of state and prime ministers on 28 June 2018. The plan was to start the construction in 2023, but the project was delayed.

In 2019, the Lithuanian Government approved a list of 14 synchronisation projects, including the construction of the Harmony Link connection with Poland, expansion of the existing LitPol Link connection by adapting it for synchronous operation, and installation of 3 synchronous compensators. At the end of 2020, 3 projects had been completed: the expansion of the Bitėnai substation, completion of a new 110 kV overhead line Pagėgiai-Bitėnai, and reconstruction of the 330 kV power transmission line Elektrėnai Power Plant – Vilnius. The Lithuanian electricity transmission system control and data centre was planned to be operation from 2025. The site was recognised by the Government as a project of national importance already in 2015. This centre was a strategic project in terms of synchronisation, because electricity transmission frequency was planned to be controlled from it. The data centre includes both the physical infrastructure, and the technological solutions to ensure cyber security.

In February 2025, the Baltic states have permanently disconnected from IPS/UPS and connected to the Continental Europe Synchronous Area.

== Governance ==
As from February 2021, the general manager of the company is Rokas Masiulis. The board consists of:

- Tomas Varneckas – chairman of the board as from 29 December 2022.
- Mindaugas Keizeris – Member of the Board as from 22 December 2022.
- Domas Sidaravičius – Independent Member of the Board as from 20 April 2020.
- Gediminas Karalius – Member of the Board as from 20 April 2022.
