= Baltic states synchronization with CESA =

Electricity infrastructure project

Location
- Country: Lithuania, Latvia, Estonia
- General direction: North–south–north (bidirectional)

Ownership information
- Partners: Litgrid; Augstsprieguma tīkls; Elering

Construction information
- Commissioned: 9 February 2025

Technical information
- Type: overhead power line
- Current type: HVAC
- AC voltage: 400 kV

The three Baltic states (Lithuania, Latvia, and Estonia) undertook the synchronization of their electric power transmission infrastructure with the Continental Europe Synchronous Area (CESA), a project known as Baltic Synchro. Managed by ENTSO-E, this initiative aimed to disconnect from the IPS/UPS system, previously governed by the 2001 BRELL Agreement with Belarus and Russia. The project was successfully completed on 9 February 2025.

== History ==
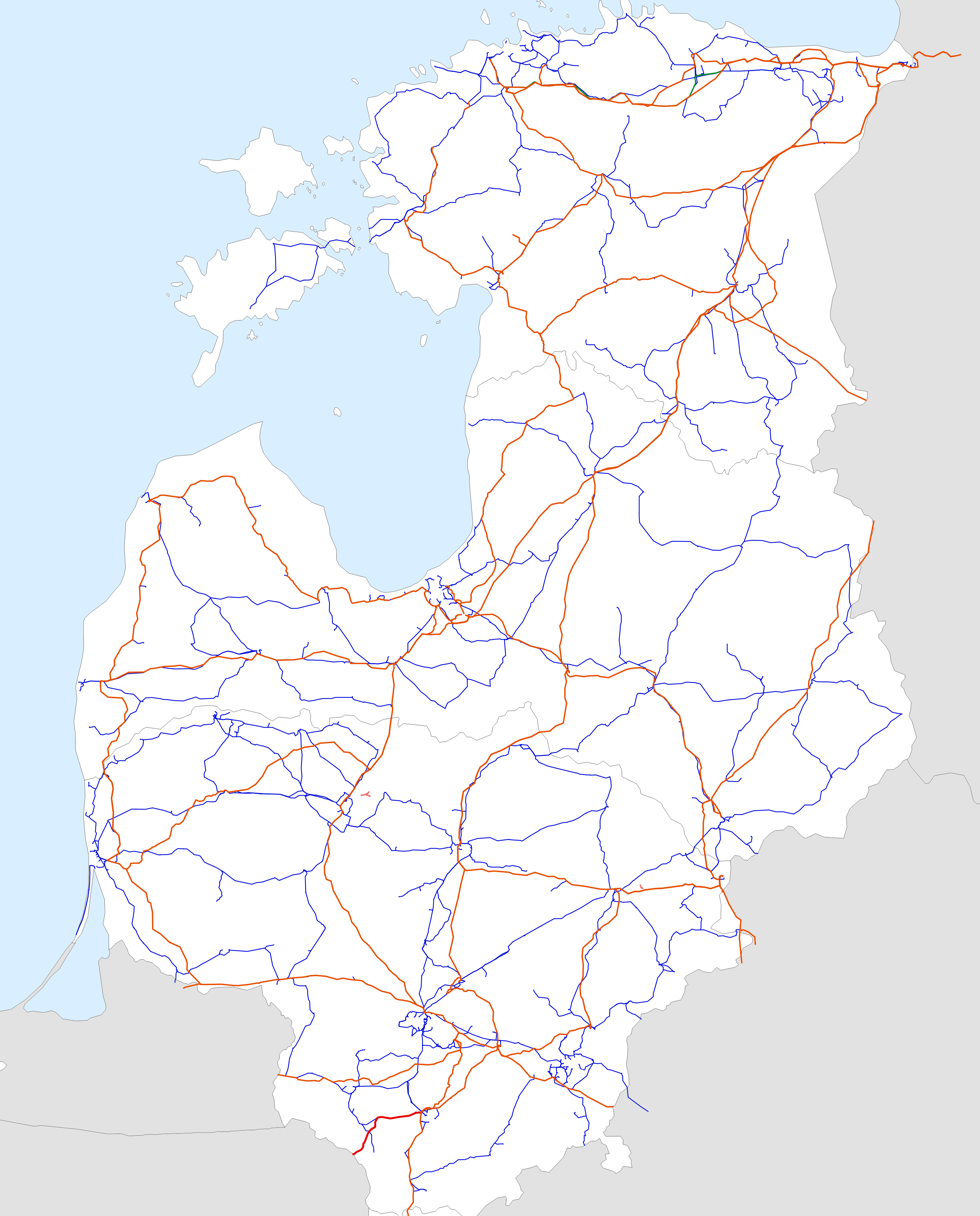
National transmission grids of electrical power overhead power lines in 2022 in the Baltic states

The electricity systems of Estonia, Latvia and Lithuania were technologically integrated into the IPS/UPS grid in the early 1960s, during the Soviet occupation of the Baltic States. In 2001, the BRELL Agreement was signed between Belarus, Russia, Estonia, Latvia, and Lithuania on the technical management of the synchronization of their power grids as part of the IPS/UPS power distribution system. Nevertheless, IPS/UPS is largely managed centrally from Moscow.

In 2007, the three Baltic states applied to join ENTSO-E (then UCTE) and began technical feasibility studies on joining the European synchronous power network. The synchronization project allows the three Baltic states to regain full control of their electricity networks and strengthen their energy security. According to the European Commission, the synchronization of Baltic states is a political and financial priority and therefore it has allocated more than €1.2 billion towards the funding of the project. Some of the facilities include new powerlines, batteries, and nine synchronous condensers.

== Chronology ==
In 2007, the prime ministers of the three Baltic states confirmed their strategic objective to become part of the continental European network. In September 2018, an official application to expand the synchronous zone was submitted to ENTSO-E. On 27 May 2019, an agreement was signed for the connection of the Baltic states to the Continental Europe synchronous electric power network operation zone.

=== Proposals to speed up the process ===
The need for synchronization became more urgent after the Russian invasion of Ukraine in 2022. Lithuanian Prime Minister Ingrida Šimonytė announced that Lithuania was seeking to speed up the process of transition and leave the IPS/UPS transmission system before 2025 with the expected finalized plan made public by the end of 2023.

On 22 April 2023, a stress test was scheduled in the Baltic states to test the infrastructure and operate for a day outside the IPS/UPS grid. Latvia and Estonia withdrew from testing, while Lithuania successfully conducted the test and concluded that the country was ready to join the synchronous grid of Continental Europe in 2024. Estonia and Latvia proposed the synchronization with the European grid be delayed to 2025 due to infrastructure not being ready. President of Lithuania Gitanas Nausėda continued to pressure both Estonia and Latvia to synchronize with continental Europe in 2024, without waiting until 2025. Eventually, the countries agreed to synchronize no later than February 2025.

=== Withdrawal from BRELL ===
On 16 July 2024, the three Baltic states, represented by their transmission system operators Elering (Estonia), AST (Latvia) and Litgrid (Lithuania), formally notified Russia and Belarus of their decision to withdraw from the BRELL Agreement. In Vilnius, a 9-metre-tall (30 ft) clock began counting down on 1 November 2024. The agreement was set to legally expire on 7 February 2025 and the Baltic states were scheduled to technologically disconnect from IPS/UPS on 8 February 2025.

=== Synchronization ===
On Saturday 8 February 2025 at 9:09 (UTC+2), the Baltic states permanently disconnected from IPS/UPS. For a day, they operated in isolated mode and conducted various frequency, voltage stability and system resilience tests. Following the disconnection, Kaliningrad became a power island, disconnected from its surrounding states. During the tests in Lithuania, the Elektrėnai Power Plant briefly went offline unplanned, but soon reconnected. On Sunday 9 February 2025, at 14:05, the Baltic states successfully synchronized with the continental European electricity grid.

== Connections ==
On 9 December 2015, Poland and Lithuania commissioned LitPol Link, which was the first direct connection between the Baltic states and the European grid. In 2018, another proposed link with Poland via the Baltic Sea was announced, called Harmony Link. The total investment planned for the Harmony Link project is around €680 million, of which €493 million will come from the Connecting Europe Facility. The Baltic States also have connections with the Nordic electricity grid via the NordBalt and Estlink HVDC submarine power cable systems, although Estlink2 was not operating at the time of the grid switchover.

== See also ==
- 2024 Estlink 2 incident
- List of high-voltage transmission links in Lithuania
