= Harmony Link =

Planned electricity link between Lithuania and Poland

Location
- Country: Lithuania, Poland
- General direction: south–north

Ownership information
- Partners: Litgrid; PSE-Operator

Construction information
- Expected: 2030

Technical information
- Type: overhead transmission line
- Capacity: 700 MW
- AC voltage: 220 kV
- No. of circuits: 2

Harmony Link is a planned overland electricity link between Lithuania and Poland. The new link will complement the existing LitPol Link and will expand the capacity between the Baltic electrical grids and the rest of the Continental Europe Synchronous Area. The total expected project cost is €923 million and the completion is planned by 2030.

== Details ==
The total investment planned for the Harmony Link project is around €680 million, of which €493 million will come from the Connecting Europe Facility.

On 21 December 2018, Lithuanian electricity grid operator Litgrid and Polish electricity grid operator PSE signed an agreement in order to start planning the cable. The project was given the official name Harmony Link. In June 2023 construction work started at the Darbėnai transmission station.

Harmony Link was originally planned to connect the Zarnowiec substation in the Pomeranian region of Poland with the Darbėnai substation in the Kretinga region of Lithuania. The key component of the interconnector was a 700 MW High Voltage Direct Current (HVDC) cable. The power link was to be about 330 km long, of which about 290 km will be the offshore part.

In late 2023, both countries agreed to change the project and build the link on land, instead of the previously planned submarine power cable. Initially, Rail Baltica railway infrastructure was considered, but the current plans are to build the line along the Via Baltica motorway infrastructure.

== See also ==
- Energy in Lithuania
- List of high-voltage transmission links in Lithuania
- LitPol Link, cable between Lithuania and Poland
- NordBalt, subsea cable between Lithuania and Sweden
- SwePol, cable between Poland and Sweden
