= Crnogorski Elektroprenosni Sistem =

Crnogorski elektroprenosni sistem AD
- Company type: Joint-stock company
- Traded as: MNSE: PREN
- Industry: Electricity
- Predecessor: Prenos AD
- Founded: 2009
- Headquarters: Podgorica, Montenegro
- Area served: Montenegro
- Key people: Ivan Asanović (CEO)
- Services: Transmission system operator
- Revenue: 28,874,175 €
- Net income: 2,448,732 €
- Total assets: 254,329,057 €
- Owner: Government of Montenegro (55%) Terna Group (22.09%) Elektromreža Srbije (15%)
- Website: http://www.cges.me/

Crnogorski elektroprenosni sistem AD (MNSE: PREN) (CGES; former name Prenos AD; meaning: Montenegrin Electrical Transmission System) (Note: AD stands for akcionarsko društvo, or Joint Stock Company.) is an electric power transmission system operator located in Podgorica, Montenegro. It is a member of European Network of Transmission System Operators for Electricity.

In 2009, the company broke away from EPCG and was partly privatized, with 55% stake owned by Government of Montenegro. 22% and 15% stake is owned by Italian and Serbian electricity transmission companies Terna and EMS respectively.

CGES and Terna have built a 450-kilometre (280 mi) 600 MW submarine cable between Tivat and Pescara.

== See also ==
- Energy in Montenegro
