= Augstsprieguma tīkls =

Latvian electricity transmission system operator

Augstsprieguma Tīkls AS
- Company type: State-owned company
- Industry: Electricity
- Founded: October 15, 1939
- Headquarters: Riga, Latvia
- Area served: Latvia
- Key people: Varis Boks (CEO)
- Services: Electric power transmission
- Revenue: €185.77 million (2019)
- Net income: €4.47 million (2019)
- Total assets: 1,022,758,598 euro (2023)
- Owner: Government of Latvia
- Number of employees: 548 (January 2020)
- Parent: Ministry of Finance
- Subsidiaries: Conexus Baltic Grid
- Website: www.ast.lv/en

Augstsprieguma Tīkls AS (AST) is an independent electricity transmission state system operator in Latvia. It operates power systems with voltages of 110 kV and above, which is leased from Latvenergo. It is also the main shareholder of Conexus Baltic Grid, a unified natural gas transmission and storage operator in Latvia.

== History ==
On 15 October 1939 the Ķegums power plant and the first substation in Riga start operation. This day is considered as the beginning of AST.

AST was a part of Latvenergo. On 2 January 2012, it was unbundled from Latvenergo and the Ministry of Finance of Latvia became the sole shareholder of AST.

In December 2017, AST bought from Uniper Ruhrgas International and Itera Latvija 18.31% and 16.05% stakes in Conexus Baltic Grid, a natural gas transmission system operator in Latvia, for €57.394 million.

== Operations ==
AST operates Latvian power systems with voltages of 110 kV and above, which is leased from Latvenergo. Its overall strategic goal is to ensure the security of electricity supply of Latvia, to provide a continuous electricity transmission service.

Latvia and the Baltic states have historically operated in the IPS/UPS grid, controlled by Russia. The origins of the idea to synchronize with the European grid go back as far as 2007, when the prime ministers of the Baltic states proposed the idea of investigating this possibility. The Baltic States have completed the synchronization with the Continental Europe Synchronous Area in February 2025.

AST plans to invest €445 million in the Latvian power transmission system in 2018–2027. In 2018, it invests €89.05 million, of which €62.1 million will be spent on implementation of the third stage in construction of the Kurzeme Ring power transmission line and €4.25 million in construction of the third power interconnection between Estonia and Latvia.

== Corporate issues ==
In 2017, the company had a turnover of €158.86 million and a profit of €309,244. In August 2018, the share capital of the company was increased up to €63,139,313 by converting the loan of €57.394 million for purchasing share in Conexus Baltic Grid into the share capital.

AST reached 4.7 million euros in 2018, of which 3.6 million will be paid as dividends to the state; the remaining amount will be invested in the fixed assetsfor implementing development projects. The turnover of AST during the reporting year was 194 million euros, which is 35 million euros more than the year before. Income from electric power transmission network services amounted to 72.6 million euros, or 37% of turnover.
