= Energy in Lithuania =

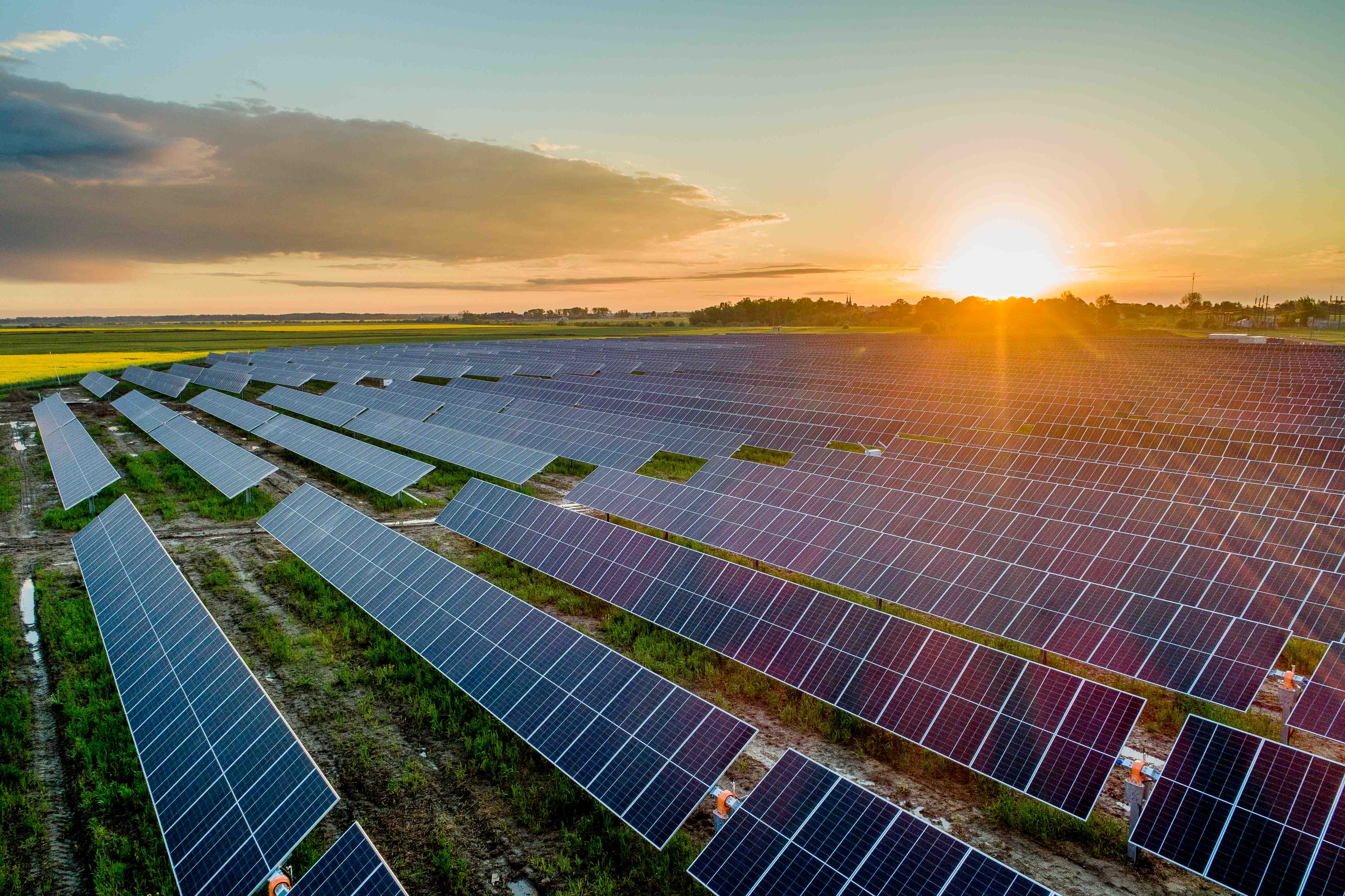
Lithuania has been significantly expanding its solar parks, growing from zero in early 2000s to 814 MW capacity in 2022.

Elektrėnai Power Plant, with the capacity of 1055 MW, is the most powerful generating station in Lithuania

Lithuania is a net energy importer. In 2019 Lithuania used around 11.4 TWh of electricity after producing just 3.6 TWh.

Systematic diversification of energy imports and resources is Lithuania's key energy strategy. Long-term aims were defined in the National Energy Independence strategy in 2012 by Lietuvos Seimas. It was estimated that strategic energy independence initiatives will cost €6.3–7.8 billion in total and provide annual savings of €0.9-1.1 billion.

Since the reestablishment of its independence, Lithuania has been investing in energy import routes independent of Russia. These included the development of the Būtingė oil terminal, the electricity interconnections NordBalt and LitPol Link, the Klaipėda LNG terminal and the Gas Interconnection Poland–Lithuania. All of these infrastructure projects allowed Lithuania to quickly cut its reliance on Russian energy supplies. It was on 22 May 2022 that Lithuania confirmed it had ceased buying gas, oil and electricity from Russia.

Lithuania has set a target to generate 70% of electricity from renewable sources by 2030, increasing to 100% by 2045.

== Energy statistics ==
2020 energy statistics

Production capacities for electricity (billion kWh)
| Type | Amount |
|---|---|
| Fossil fuel | 11.69 |
| Wind power | 10.92 |
| Biomass | 5.14 |
| Hydro | 2.12 |
| Solar | 0.53 |
| Total | 30.40 |

Electricity (billion kWh)
| Category | Amount |
|---|---|
| Consumption | 11.06 |
| Production | 4.11 |
| Import | 12.01 |
| Export | 4.11 |

Crude Oil (barrels per day)
| Consumption | 68,000 |
| Production | 4,000 |
| Import | 194,400 |
| Export | 900 |

Natural Gas (billion m^{3})
| Consumption | 2.23 |
| Import | 2.82 |
| Export | 0.49 |

CO_{2} emissions:
11.69 million tons

- In 2020 Lithuania imported almost 70% of its energy, with 96.1% of imports coming from Russia.
- In 2021, Lithuania spent over €3 billion on Russian oil, gas, and electricity.
- In 2025, Lithuania stopped importing electricity from russia.

== Fuel types ==
=== Fossil fuels ===
==== Natural gas ====
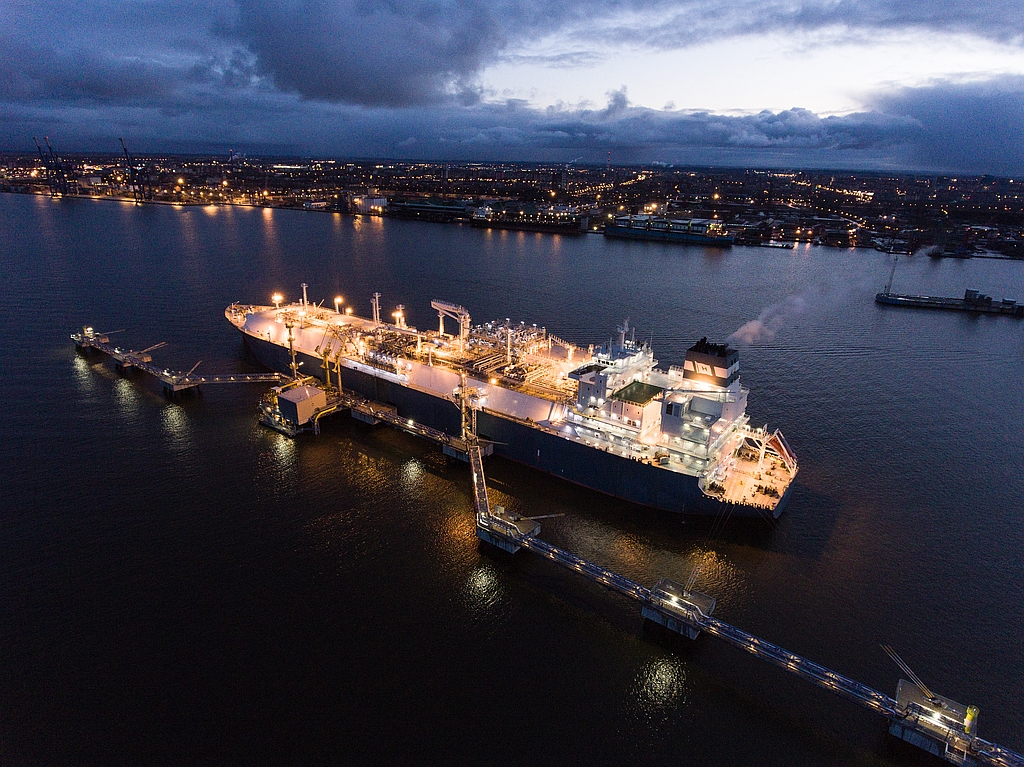
FSRU Independence in port of Klaipėda

In order to break down Gazprom's monopoly in the natural gas market of Lithuania, Klaipėda LNG FSRU, the first large scale LNG import terminal in the Baltic region, was built in port of Klaipėda in 2014. Equinor will be supplying 540 million cubic meters of natural gas annually from 2015 until 2020. The terminal is able to meet all of Lithuania's demand, and 90% of Latvia's and Estonia's national demand in the future.

Gas Interconnection Poland–Lithuania (GIPL), also known as the Lithuania–Poland pipeline, a natural gas pipeline interconnection between Lithuania and Poland was completed and became operational on 1 May 2022. The capacity is 1.9 billion cubic metres per year. EUR 266.3 million co-financing was received from the EU Budget.

Work increasing the capacity through the Lithuania–Latvia Interconnection is being undertaken in 2023 at a cost of EUR 10.2 million.

AB Amber Grid, the Lithuanian gas transmission system operator, is responsible for the safe and reliable transmission of natural gas through high-pressure pipelines.

Natural gas companies in Lithuania include Lietuvos Dujos and Ignitis.

==== Coal ====
In 2021 Lithuania used coal to generate 2% of the country's electricity.

=== Renewable energy ===
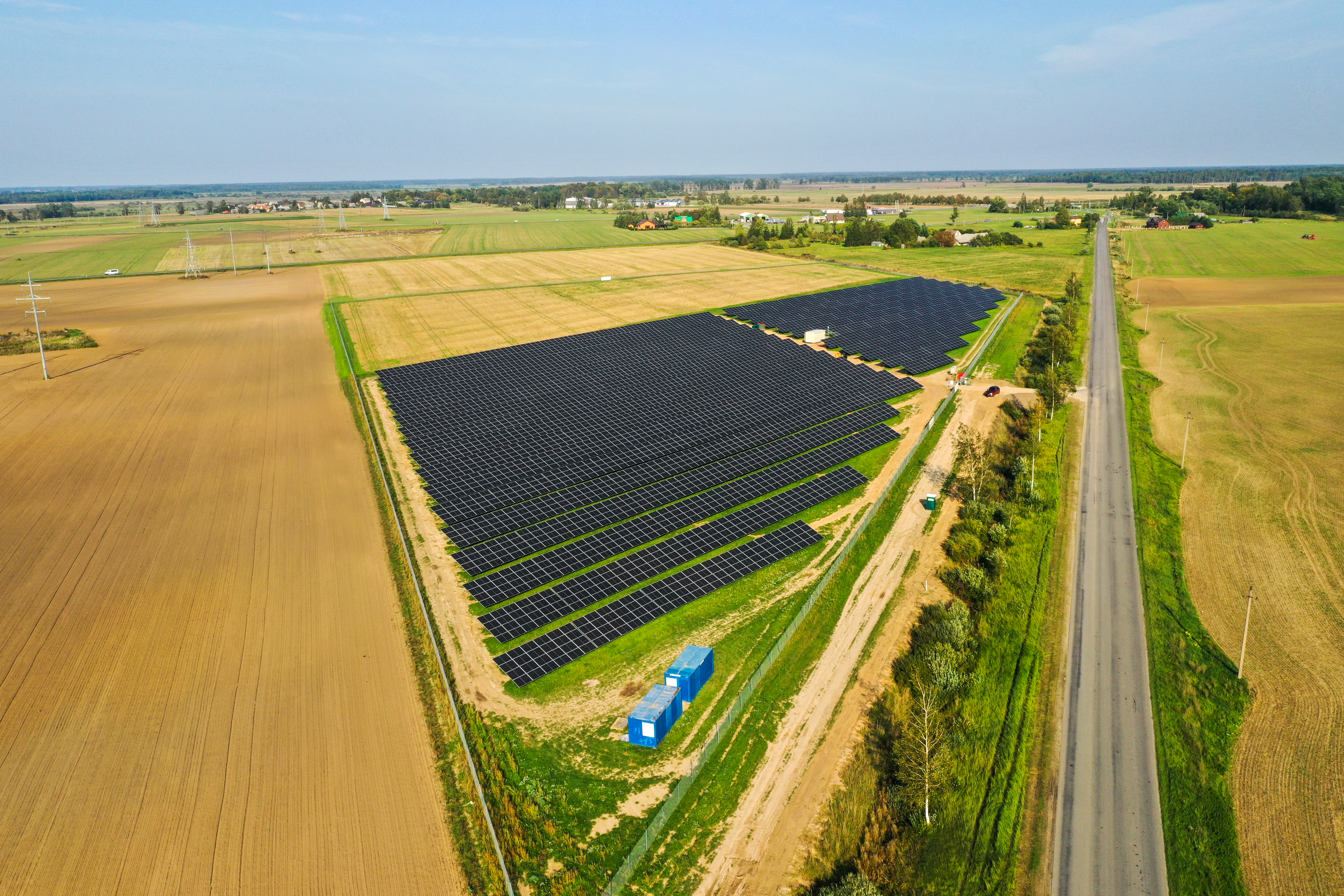
Solar park in Kuršėnai with 5MW capacity in 2021

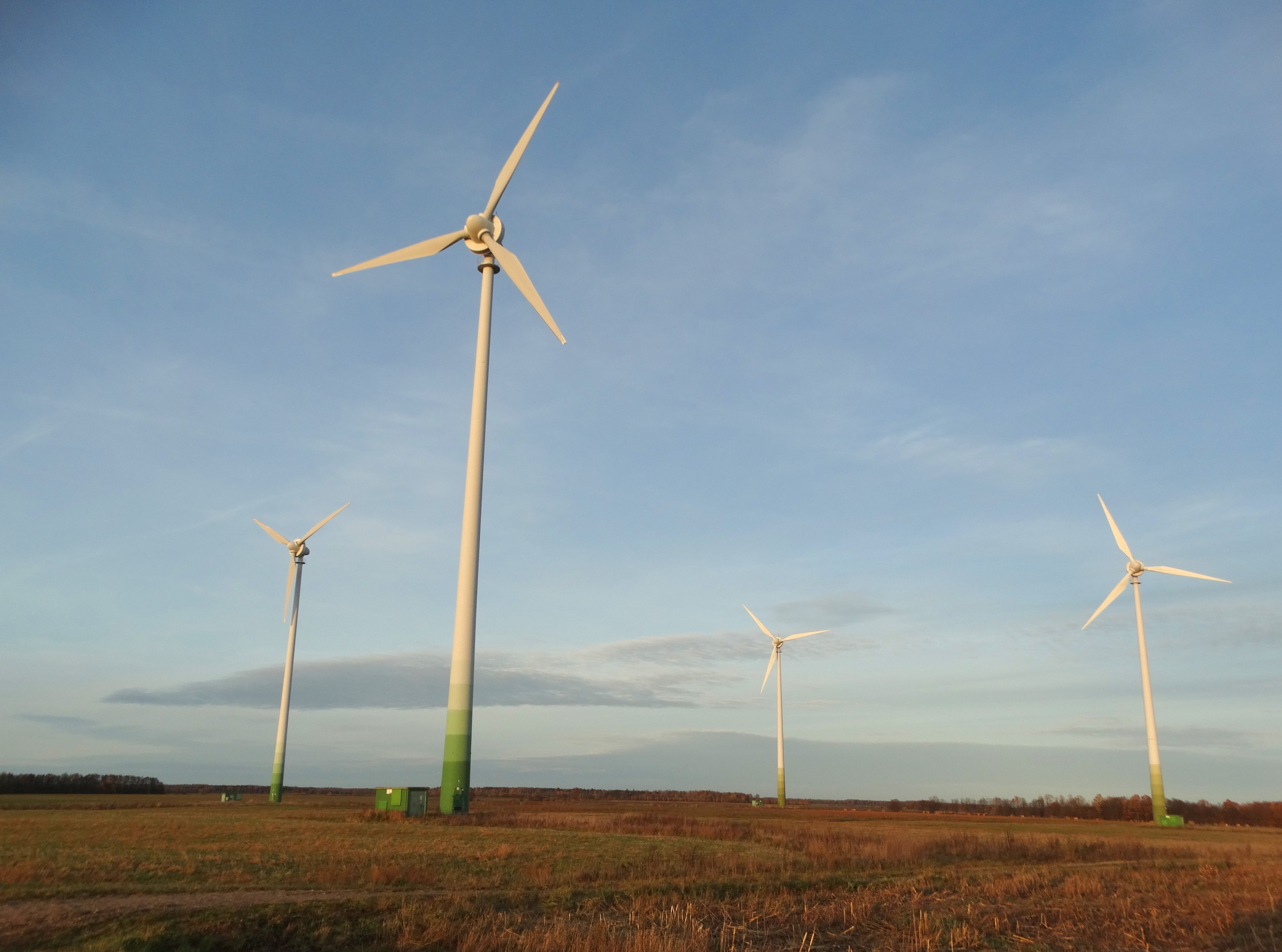
Wind turbines in Tauragė County, Lithuania

Years in which the last three renewable power levels achieved
| Achievement | Year | Achievement | Year | Achievement | Year |
|---|---|---|---|---|---|
| 20% | 2009 | 25% | 2013 | 30% | 2016 |

Renewable energy includes wind, solar, biomass and geothermal energy sources.

In 2016, renewable energy constituted 27.9% of the country's overall electricity generation. Previously, the Lithuanian government aimed to generate 23% of total power from renewable resources by 2020. This goal was achieved in 2014, with 23.9% of power being from renewable sources.

Kruonis Pumped Storage Plant provides energy storage, averaging electrical demand throughout the day. The pumped storage plant has a capacity of 900 MW (4 units, 225 MW each). Kaunas Hydroelectric Power Plant has 100 MW of capacity and supplies about 3% of the electrical demand in Lithuania.

==== Wind power ====
With installed wind capacity of 178 MW in 2016, and an average power consumption of 1.1 GW, Lithuania was the EU Member State with the highest level of new wind capacity installed in 2016 relative to its power consumption. By 2022, wind power capacity was 814 MW

Studies suggest that Lithuania has the largest offshore wind potential out the three Baltic States. It is estimated that Lithuania could have up to 3.6 GW of offshore windfarms by 2050.

==== Solar power ====
As of 2022 Lithuania had capacity of 568 MW of solar power. Lithuania has also changed the law to make it easier from a planning and environmental aspect to install solar farms.

==== Biomass ====
Vilnius Biofuel Power Plant

Biomass provides over 10% of Lithuania's power capacity.

=== Green Hydrogen ===
Lithuania has allocated €50m to create a green hydrogen system of 65 megawatts (MW) with an annual volume of more than 8,000 tons, to be completed by 2027.

=== Nuclear ===
Visaginas's Ignalina Nuclear Power Plant once provided 70% of Lithuania's electricity and exported energy to elsewhere in the Soviet Union. After the dissolution of the Soviet Union, the European Union required the country to commit to nuclear decommissioning in Visaginas for Lithuania to join.

Ignalina's last plant closed in 2009 in line with the commitments made when Lithuania joined EU in 2004.

A new nuclear power plant in Visaginas has been proposed but the status of the project is uncertain after it was rejected by the voters in a referendum in 2012.

== Electricity ==
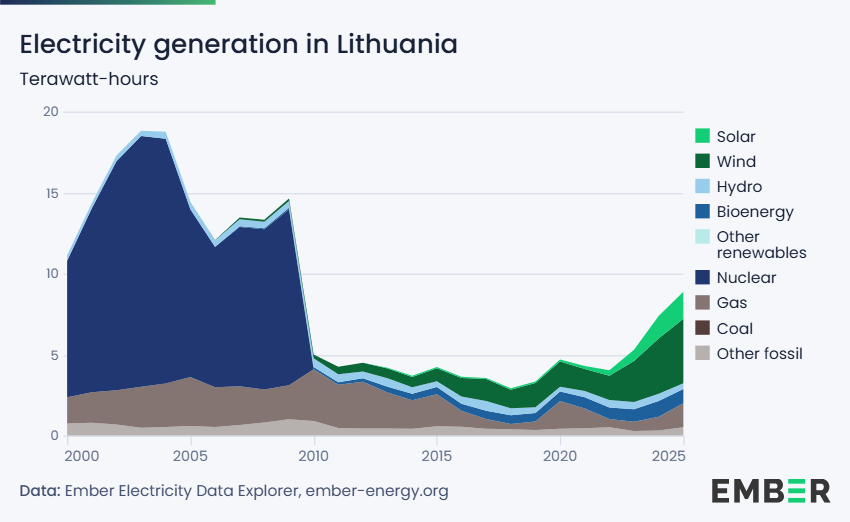
Electricity generation in Lithuania in terawatt-hours

Lithuania imports 70% of its electrical power, since 2022, mostly from Sweden. In 2015, transmission lines connected Lithuania to Sweden (700MW) and Poland (500MW). Construction of 200 MW / 200 MWh grid batteries started in 2022, to increase grid stability.

Following the Russian invasion of Ukraine, Lithuania halted all import of Russian electricity in May 2022

On 8 February 2025 at 9:09 AM (UTC+2), Lithuania, together with Latvia and Estonia, have permanently disconnected and left the Russian-led BRELL synchronous electricity transmission grid and the next day, on 9 February, synchronized with Continental Europe. An interconnector linking the Lithuania with Poland is to be built, called the Harmony Link Interconnector, 330km undersea high voltage DC current landing at Darbėnai.

== See also ==
- Energy in Latvia
- Energy in Estonia
