= SwePol =

High-voltage submarine cable between Sweden and Poland

- Location of SwePol

Location
- Country: Sweden, Poland
- Coordinates: 54°30′7.6″N 16°53′28.4″E; 56°09′10.7″N 14°50′29.4″E
- General direction: north–south
- From: Stärnö Static Inverter Plant, Sweden
- Passes through: Baltic Sea
- To: Bruskowo Wielkie Static Inverter Plant, Poland

Ownership information
- Owner: Svenska Kraftnät, PSE-Operator

Construction information
- Cable manufacturer: ABB
- Substation manufacturer: ABB
- Commissioned: 2000

Technical information
- Type: subsea cable
- Current type: HVDC
- Total length: 254 km (158 mi)
- Capacity: 600 MW
- AC voltage: 400 kV (both ends)
- DC voltage: 450 kV
- No. of poles: 1

SwePol is a 254.05-kilometre (157.86 mi)-long monopolar high-voltage direct current (HVDC) submarine cable between the Stärnö peninsula near Karlshamn, Sweden, and Bruskowo Wielkie, near Słupsk, Poland. The link was inaugurated in 2000 and can transmit up to 600 MW power at a voltage of 450 kV.

The cable has a cross section of 2,100 square millimetres (3.3 sq in). It runs for 2.22 kilometres (1.38 mi) as an underground cable from the Stärno HVDC Station to the shore of the Baltic Sea. The 239.28 kilometres (148.68 mi) long submarine cable comes ashore in Poland near Ustka at 54°34′25″N 16°46′57″E and runs underground for the remaining 12.55 kilometres (7.80 mi) to Bruskowo Wielkie HVDC Static Inverter Plant.

Unlike other monopolar HVDC schemes, Swepol uses a metallic return consisting of 2 cables with 630 square millimetres (0.98 sq in) sections for the submarine portion of the line, and a single cable with 1,100 square millimetres (1.7 sq in) sections for the land portions.

Both stations use air-core inductance smoothing rectifiers of 225 mH and a weight of 27.5 tonnes (61,000 lb), with filters for the 11th, 13th, 24th, and 36th harmonics. Each filter consists of a coil and a capacitor switched in row. The filters for the 11th and 13th harmonics are adjustable. The filters deliver a reactive power of 95 Mvar. Additional 95 Mvar reactive power is delivered by a capacitor bank. Each station's static inverter, which is switched as a 12-pulse thyristor bridge, consists of 792 thyristors arranged in three 16-metre (52 ft) high towers installed in a valve hall.

It was initially owned and maintained by SwePol Link AB, a company jointly owned by the state-owned Swedish power company Svenska Kraftnät (51%), Vattenfall (16%), and Polish transmission system operator PSE-Operator (33%), but the company was liquidated and the cable was acquired by Svenska Kraftnät for the Swedish and PSE-Operator for the Polish part of the cable.

Since coming online, 11 instances of cable damage have occurred: one on the high voltage line and 10 on the return cable. Causes have included ship anchors, fishing nets, fire, and grid power disturbances. On 14 February 2005, the smoothing reactor at the HVDC station at Bruskowo Wielkie was destroyed by fire. Repairs took 20 hours.

Initially SwePol was used to export electricity to Poland only.

From January to October 2020 Poland exported 1,225.9 GWh of electricity and imported 12,573.1 GWh compared to 872.8 GWh and 9,326.7 GWh in the same period of 2019. The largest import was from Germany 3,222.2 GWh, Sweden 3,195.9 GWh and the Czech Republic 2,561.5 GW. Poland's power market will face a supply squeeze from 2025, when a tightening of EU rules on plants’ CO_{2} emissions will force nearly 5 GW of thermal capacity out of the system, the nation's TSO has warned.

When the Nord Stream gas pipeline, also in the Baltic Sea, began to leak in September 2022 and sabotage was suspected, many people feared that the SwePol link had also been damaged. Tests by Svenska Kraftnät, published on 4 October the same year, indicated that was not the case.

== Annual reports ==
In 2016, SwePol had an available technical capacity of 87%. The technical capacity not used was 25%. Totally, 2.8 TWh (52.4% of the technical capacity) was exported from Sweden to Poland and 0.2 TWh (3.3% of the technical capacity) was imported to Sweden.

In 2017, SwePol had an available technical capacity of 94.2%. The technical capacity not used was 31.9%. Totally, 3.1 TWh (59.4% of the technical capacity) was exported from Sweden to Poland and 0.2 TWh (2.9% of the technical capacity) was imported to Sweden.

In 2018, SwePol had an available technical capacity of 96%. The technical capacity not used was 30%. Totally, 3.1 TWh (59% of the technical capacity) was exported from Sweden to Poland and 0.4 TWh (7% of the technical capacity) was imported to Sweden.

In 2019, SwePol had an available technical capacity of 86%. The technical capacity not used was 24%. Totally, 3.1 TWh (59% of the technical capacity) was exported from Sweden to Poland and 0.2 TWh (4% of the technical capacity) was imported to Sweden. SwePol transmitted 62% of its technical capacity, which is slightly less than in 2018 but still higher than the average utilisation since 2012. The available capacity was lower than normally due to an unplanned maintenance outage and a disturbance outage. The unplanned maintenance outage was caused by an oil leakage and the disturbance outage was caused by a valve cooling system failure lasting 29 days.

In 2020, SwePol had an available technical capacity of 87%. The technical capacity not used was 13%. Totally, 3.8 TWh (72% of the technical capacity) was transmitted south from Sweden to Poland and >0.1 TWh (0.2% of the technical capacity) was transmitted north to Sweden. The annual maintenance of SwePol lasted 6 days in September. Additionally, SwePol had 3 other planned maintenance outages and 1 other outage during 2020. SwePol had 3 minor disturbance outages and 1 more severe disturbance outage in 2020. The severe disturbance outage was caused by a fire in the AC filter on the Polish side in January, and it took 19 days to bring the HVDC link back online after it.

In 2021, SwePol had an available technical capacity of 91%. The technical capacity not used was 22%. Totally, 3.4 TWh (65% of the technical capacity) was transmitted south (SE4→PL) and 0.2 TWh (4% of the technical capacity) was transmitted north (PL→SE4). The annual maintenance of SwePol lasted 6 days in September. Additionally, SwePol had 10 other planned maintenance outages during 2021. There were 5 minor disturbance outages, of which one lasted more than 8 hours. SwePol was offline due to disturbance outages for 49 hours in total in 2021.

In 2022, SwePol had an available technical capacity of 87%. The technical capacity not used was 11%. Totally, 3.9 TWh (74% of the technical capacity) was transmitted south (SE4→PL) and 0.1 TWh (2% of the technical capacity) was transmitted north (PL→SE4). Swepol experienced a total of 23 outages, comprising 17 maintenance outages and 6 disturbances. Among the maintenance outages, a majority of them were brief and conducted for corrective maintenance purposes, even though the specific reasons behind these mainte nance requirements remained unclear. The annual maintenance period for SwePol occurred over a duration of 29 days, spanning September and October. This extended maintenance period led to a decrease in the available technical capacity, which dropped to 87,3%.

In 2023, SwePol had an available technical capacity of 90%. The technical capacity not used was 13%. Totally, 4.0 TWh (77% of the technical capacity) was transmitted south (SE4→PL) and 0.3 TWh (5% of the technical capacity) was transmitted north (PL→SE4). Swepol experienced a total of 20 outages, comprising 17 planned maintenance outages and 3 disturbances outages. Among the maintenance outages, a majority of them were brief and conducted for corrective maintenance. The specific reasons for these maintenances have in many cases not been reported. Reported reasons are for instance AC busbar maintenance and control center maintenance. The annual maintenance for SwePol took place during 13 days in October and the available technical capacity during the year was approximately 90%.

== Sites ==
Site	Coordinates
Bruskowo Wielkie Static Inverter Plant	54°30′7.6″N 16°53′28.4″E
Stärnö Static Inverter Plant	56°09′10.7″N 14°50′29.4″E

== Cultural meaning ==
Swepol Link is also the name of a local soccer team in the town of Bruskowo Wielkie.

== See also ==
- Energy in Poland
- Electricity sector in Sweden
- List of high-voltage transmission links in Sweden
- Estlink, cable between Estonia and Finland
- LitPol Link, cable between Lithuania and Poland
- Harmony Link, subsea cable between Lithuania and Poland
