= Ignalina Nuclear Power Plant =

Decommissioned nuclear power plant in Visaginas Municipality, Lithuania

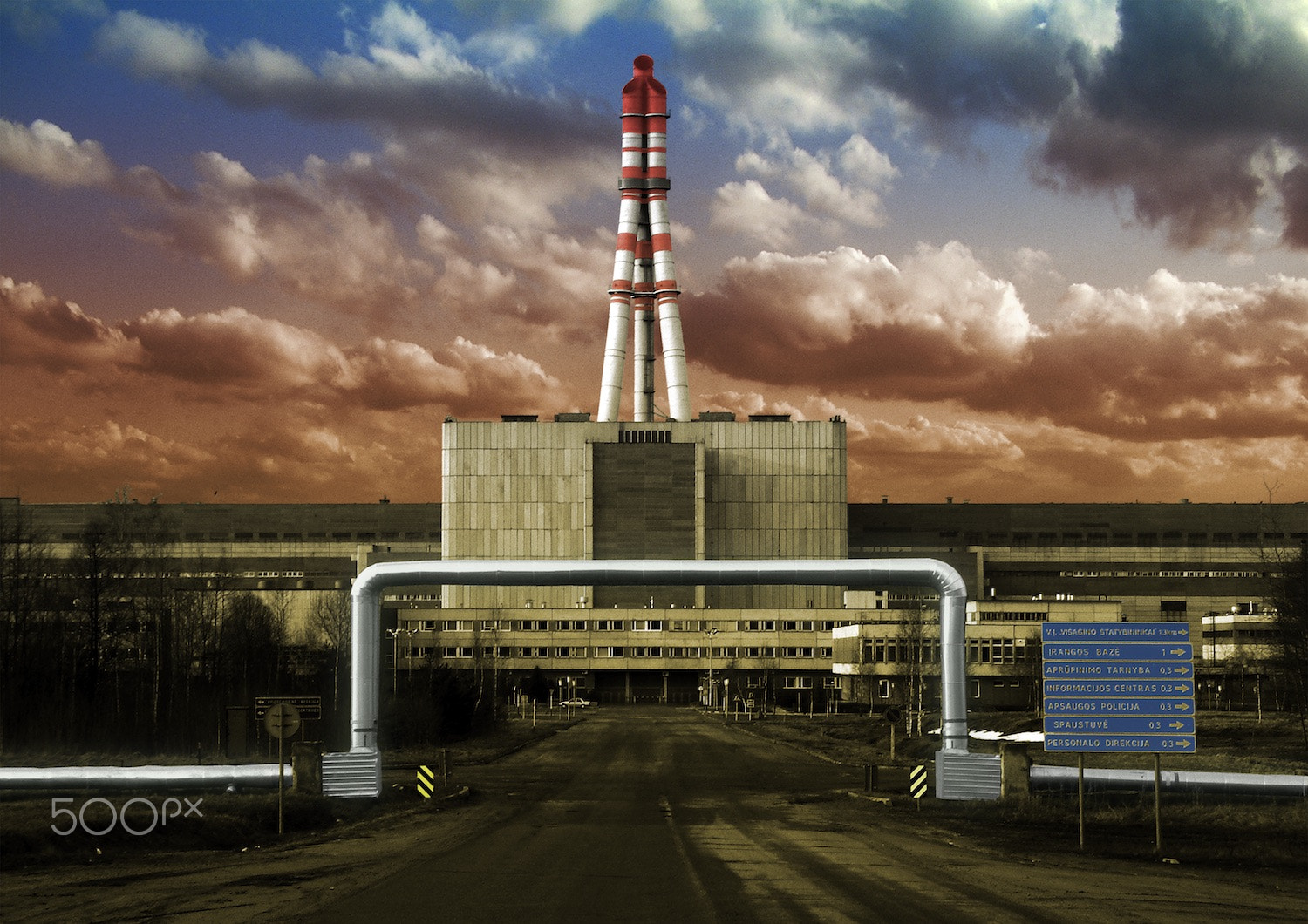
- Official name: Ignalinos Atominė Elektrinė
- Country: Lithuania
- Location: Visaginas municipality
- Coordinates: 55°36′16″N 26°33′36″E
- Status: Decommissioned
- Construction began: 1977
- Commission date: 31 December 1983
- Decommission date: 31 December 2009
- Operator: Ignalinos Atominė Elektrinė
- Employees: 1,600 (2024)

Nuclear power station
- Reactor type: RBMK-1500
- Reactor supplier: Mintyazhmash
- Cooling source: Lake Drūkšiai
- Thermal capacity: 2 x 4800 MWt

Power generation
- Make and model: Kharkiv turbine plant Electrosila
- Units cancelled: 2 x 1,380 MW
- Units decommissioned: 2 x 1,380 MW
- Nameplate capacity: 2,600 MW
- Capacity factor: 59.2%
- Annual net output: 19,240 GW·h (2004)

External links
- Website: www.iae.lt
- Commons: Related media on Commons

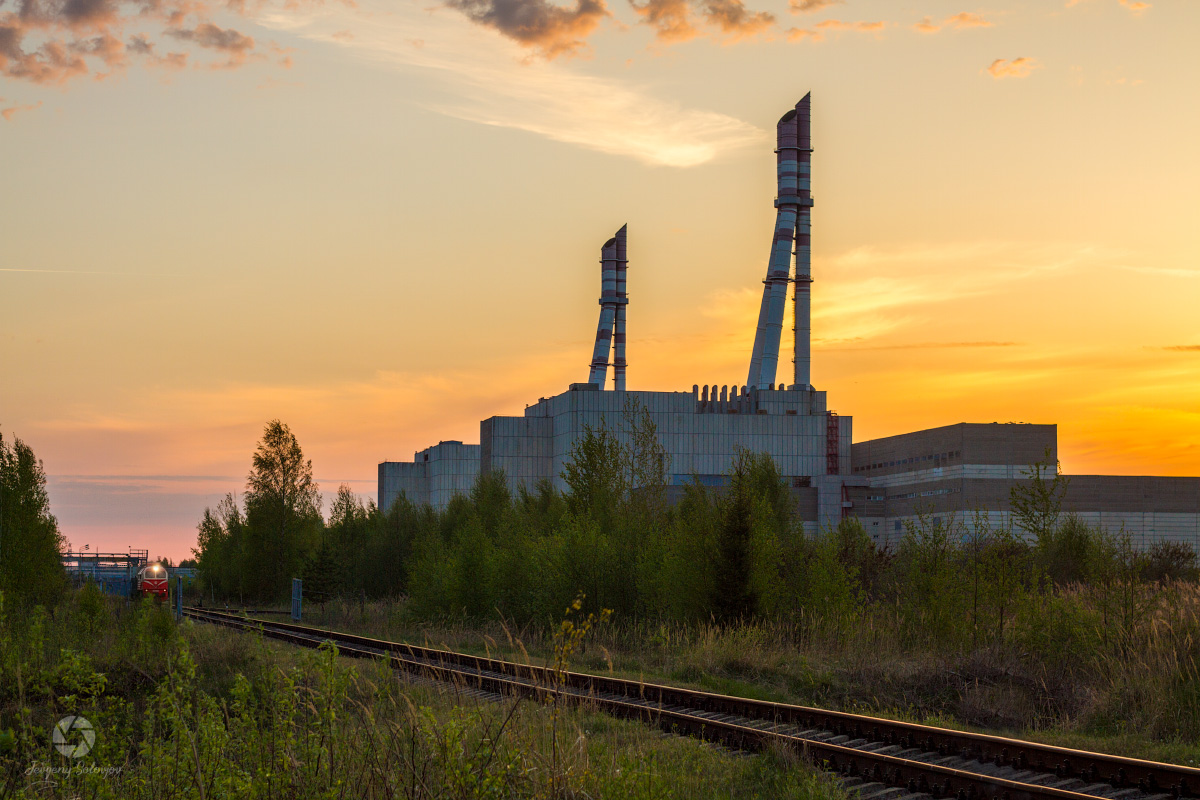
Ignalina Nuclear Power Plant, Rimšės sen., Lithuania, 2018

The Ignalina Nuclear Power Plant (Lithuanian: Ignalinos atominė elektrinė, IAE) is a decommissioned two-unit RBMK-1500 nuclear power station in Visaginas Municipality, Lithuania. It was named after the nearby city of Ignalina. Due to the plant's similarities to the infamous Chernobyl Nuclear Power Plant in both reactor design and lack of a robust containment building, Lithuania agreed to close the plant as part of its agreement of accession to the European Union. Unit 1 was closed in December 2004; Unit 2 in December 2009. The plant accounted for 25% of Lithuania's electricity generating capacity and supplied about 70% of Lithuania's electrical demand. It was closed on 31 December 2009. Proposals have been made to construct a new nuclear power plant at the site, but such plans have yet to come to fruition. It was the country's only nuclear power plant.

== Reactors ==
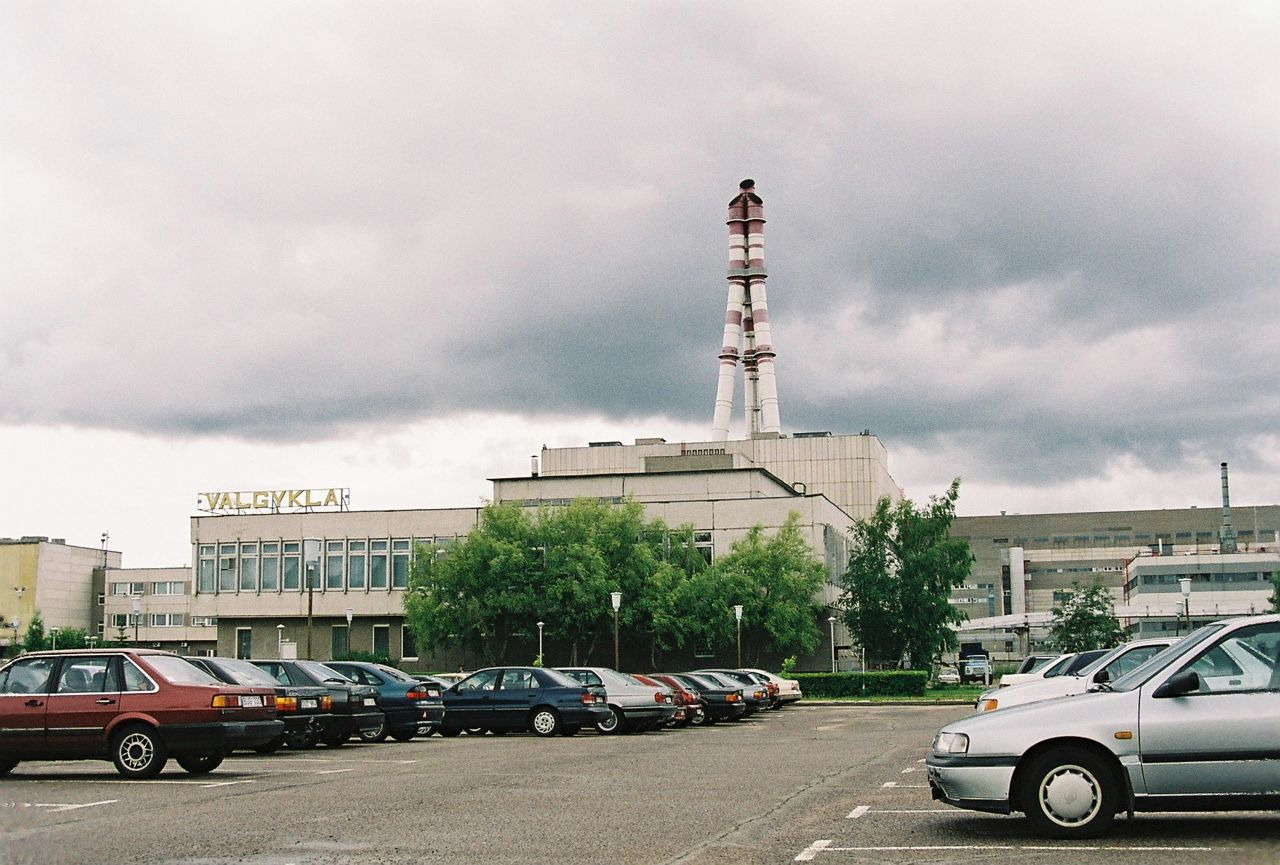
Unit 1 of the power plant.

The Ignalina Nuclear Power Plant contained two Soviet-designed RBMK-1500 water-cooled graphite-moderated channel-type power reactors. After the Chernobyl disaster of April 1986, the reactor was de-rated to 1,360 MW. Each unit of the power plant was equipped with two K-750-65/3000 turbines with 800 MW generators built by the Kharkiv turbine plant (Turboatom).

== History ==
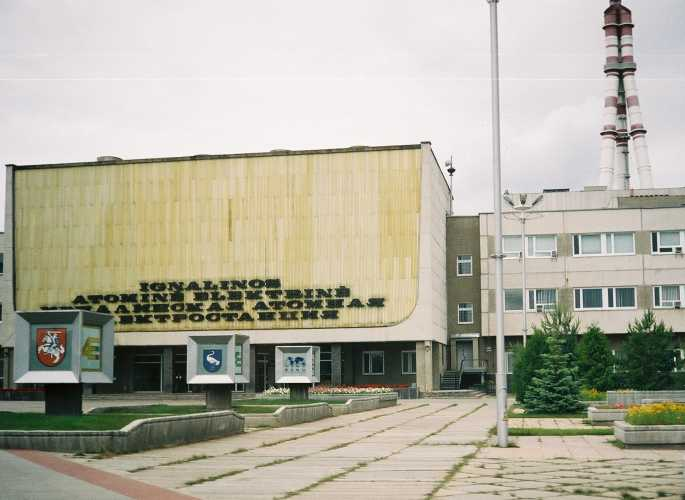
Entrance to the Ignalina Nuclear Power Plant

The Soviet Union intended Ignalina Nuclear Power Plant as a symbol of its technological progress. Preparations for the construction began in 1974. Field work began three years later. Unit 1 came online in December 1983, and was closed on December 31, 2004. Unit 2 came online in August 1987 and was closed on December 31, 2009 at 23:00 EET (21:00 UTC).

Originally, Unit 2 was scheduled for launch in 1986, but its commissioning was postponed for a year because of the Chernobyl disaster that year. The construction of Unit 3 started in 1985, but was suspended in 1988 and subsequently cancelled, and its demolition began in 1989. Its dismantling was completed in 2008.

The town of Visaginas was built to accommodate Ignalina's workers. About 5,000 people worked at the plant, which produced 70% of the Lithuanian S.S.R's electricity and exported power to elsewhere in the Soviet Union. At the time, the settlements at Visaginas were no more than villages, making it a prominent example of "greenfield investment", a situation when a large town or industrial facility is built in an area with little existing infrastructure. Ignalina was sited next to the largest lake in Lithuania, Lake Drūkšiai (part of which lies in neighbouring Belarus), which provided the plant's cooling water. The temperature of the lake has risen by about 3 °C (5.4 °F) during the operations of I.N.P.P., causing eutrophication. Ignalina's discharges of radionuclides and heavy metals have accumulated in lake waters and sediments. Its spent fuel was placed in CASTOR and CONSTOR storage casks during the 2000s.

In 2005, the State Security Department of Lithuania investigated the activities of Vladimir Alganov, who in 1997 had been expelled from Poland for espionage, and learned that he had met with the management of the Ignalina Nuclear Power Plant and at their request obtained a long-term Lithuanian visa in 2002.

== Incidents ==
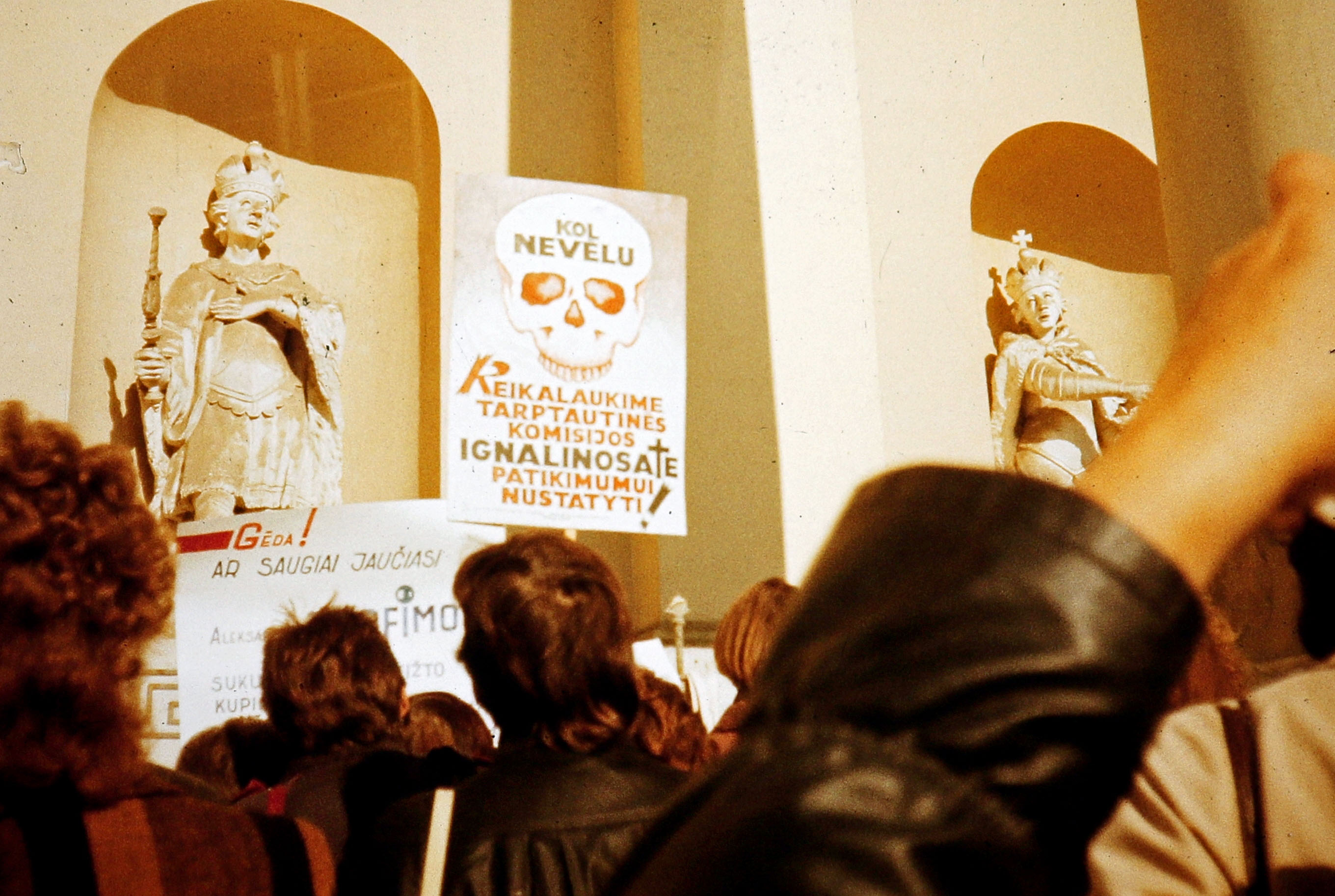
Protests against Ignalina Power Plant in Vilnius (1988)

In December 1983, when Ignalina Unit 1 came online, a design flaw of the RBMK was noticed for the first time. When the graphite-displacer tips on its control rods were inserted into the reactor, they immediately caused a power excursion. Unit 1's control rods did not get stuck; they reached the bottom of the reactor, and the boron in the control rods stopped the nuclear reaction. Other nuclear organizations and RBMK plants were informed of the problem, but it was not addressed until after a similar power surge partly caused the 1986 Chernobyl Disaster. The subsequent modifications were tested at Ignalina during 1987 and 1988.

According to an Ignalina Nuclear Power Plant press release, on June 6, 2009, at 09:15 EEST (06:15 UTC), the automatic reactor protection system was actuated and Unit 2 was shut down. No radiation was released. Plant officials decided to keep it off-line for thirty days, performing the annual preventive maintenance in June, instead of August 29–September 27 as originally scheduled.

== Shutdown ==
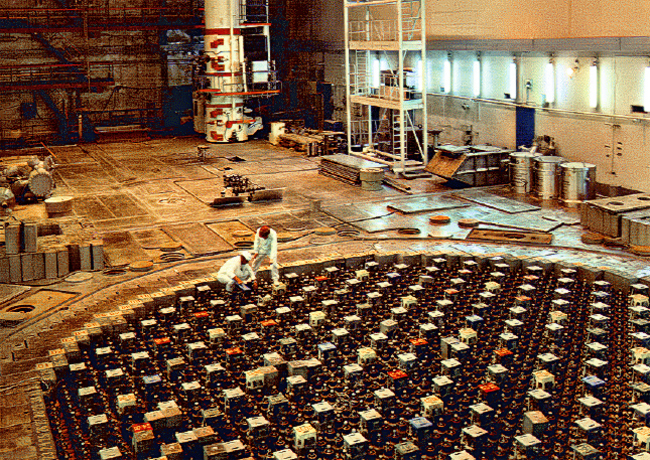
Ignalina RBMK reactor tube tops

As a condition of entry into the European Union, Lithuania agreed in 1999 to close existing units of the station, citing the Ignalina plant's lack of a containment building as a high risk. The EU agreed to pay €820 million decommissioning costs and compensation, with payments continuing until 2013.

The closure of Ignalina faced fierce opposition from Lithuanians, as it provided income to most local residents. To compensate for this, a project was started to encourage tourism and other small businesses. Others were afraid that the price of electricity would skyrocket or that Lithuania would be left to cope with the extremely high costs of decommissioning the plant and disposing of its nuclear waste. A 2008 referendum proposed extending the operation of Unit 2 until a new plant could be completed as a replacement; the referendum gained 1,155,192 votes for the proposal, but ultimately failed to gain the 50% turnout necessary to be passed. President Valdas Adamkus opposed the measure on grounds that continued operation would not respect Lithuania's international commitments.

The Lithuanian government initially forecast a 30% rise in the price of electricity for households from 2010. Analysts expect that the shutdown could cut Lithuania's gross domestic product growth by 1–1.5%, and increase inflation by 1%. Ignalina's production will be compensated for by production of the fossil fuel Elektrėnai Power Plant as well as by imports from Russia, Latvia, Estonia, Ukraine, and Belarus. The closure may test Lithuanian–Russian relations. Responding to concerns that Lithuania would become more dependent on Russian energy sources that could be withdrawn if relations deteriorate, President Dalia Grybauskaitė issued reassuring statements in late 2009. This has not materialised as in March of 2022 Lithuania has cut off all Russian gas imports. Lithuania imports 70% of its power, mostly from Sweden, and the average price of electricity is currently below the EU's average. In 2015, transmission lines connected Lithuania to Sweden (700 MW) and Poland (500 MW).

== Decommissioning ==
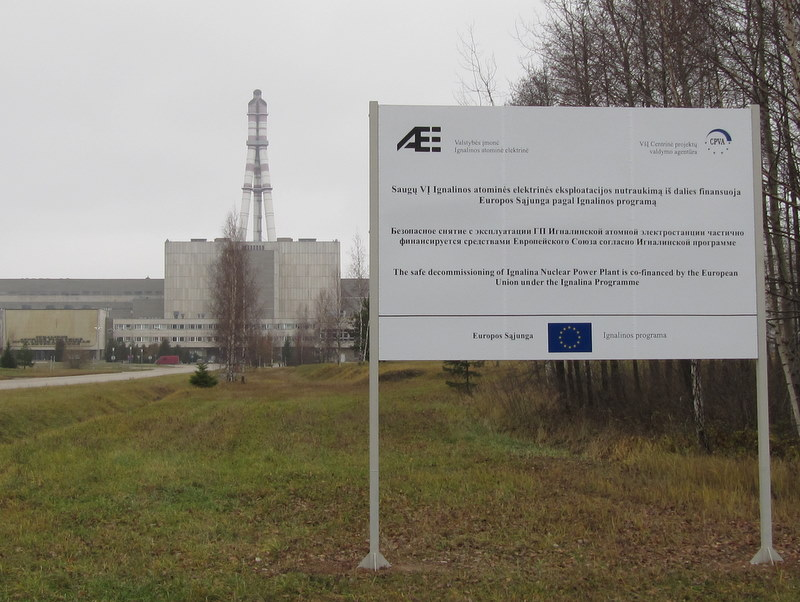
Information stand about the decommissioning

The Ignalina NPP decommissioning project includes decommissioning of Unit 1, Unit 2 and other auxiliary facilities. The process is divided into two phases. The first phase started in 2004 and continued until 2013. The second phase was scheduled for 2014–2029. By 2030, the site of two reactors should be ready for re-use ("brownfield").

On 26 November 2002, the Lithuanian government passed a resolution that the Ignalina NPP Unit 1 was to be decommissioned and immediately dismantled. The choice of method was influenced by economic and social factors, safety aspects, and decommissioning work experience at other nuclear power plants. Representatives of Ignalina NPP were also in favor of immediate dismantling because in this case prerequisites would be created for improving employment rate. One of the decommissioning priorities is an in-house approach – to perform as much work as possible with own personnel.

Unloading of used fuel from the unit 2 began on 1 February 2011.

=== Financing ===
The decommissioning program was financed by the European Union, the Ignalina International Decommissioning Support Fund, and the SE Ignalina NPP National Decommissioning Fund. About 95% of the funds were provided by the international community, while 5% was provided by the Lithuanian state.

In 2001 the Ignalina International Decommissioning Support Fund was established, administered by the European Bank of Reconstruction and Development (EBRD). Participants in this fund are the EBRD, the European Commission, and 15 donor countries.

Strategic energy projects financed by the European Union included construction of the new unit at the Elektrėnai Power Plant.

=== Repository and storage ===
There will be three different type of storage facilities: for the spent nuclear fuel, nuclear fuel waste and radioactive waste.

Most of the facilities will be built by Nukem Technologies, a subsidiary of Atomstroyexport. A contract for construction of a spent fuel facility was given by Nukem Technologies to the Lithuanian construction company Vėtrūna. A near-surface repository for redundant materials and waste is to be built by a consortium led by Areva TA. The repository should be completed by 2017 and it is expected to cost €10 million.

Gesellschaft für Nuklear-Service is responsible for transporting and storing the radioactive material from the water tanks at Ignalina's units.

=== Controversies ===
On 18 May 2010, Lithuanian energy minister Arvydas Sekmokas announced that although 60% of the funds have been spent, no single project has been completed. As of 2011, phase 1 of decommissioning is three to four years behind schedule. According to Osvaldas Čiukšys, the former CEO of the Ignalina plant, Nukem Technologies is going to request an additional €100 million for completing the nuclear waste storage facility. This was opposed by the former vice minister of energy and chairman of the board of Ignalina plant Romas Švedas, who unexpectedly resigned on 6 September 2011.

There is a dispute between the Government of Lithuania and the EBRD about the administration of the Ignalina International Decommissioning Support Fund. There is also a dispute between the Lithuanian authorities and Gesellschaft für Nuklear-Service over the safety of radioactive waste transportation and storage casks.

The project faces a financing gap of €1.5 billion for the second phase of construction after 2014.

== New power plant ==
There was discussion during the 1990s and 2000s of building a new nuclear power plant at the same site, forestalling the likelihood of an upcoming power shortage in the region. On February 27, 2006, at a meeting in Trakai, the Prime Ministers of Lithuania, Latvia and Estonia signed a communiqué which invited state-owned energy companies in the three countries to invest in the design and construction of a new nuclear power plant in Lithuania. On June 28, 2007, Lithuania's parliament adopted a law on building a new nuclear power plant, the formal start of the project. On July 30, 2008, the power companies of Lithuania, Estonia, Latvia and Poland agreed to set up the Visaginas Nuclear Plant Company, which would have been responsible for the construction of the new power plant with a capacity of 3,000–3,200 MW. GE Vernova Hitachi Nuclear Energy (then GE Hitachi Nuclear Energy) was selected as a strategic investor in the project.

Eventually the project was stopped as the 2012 Lithuanian nuclear power referendum results did not provide a mandate for the government to continue.

== In popular culture ==
Due to its internal visual similarity to the Chernobyl Nuclear Power Plant, Ignalina served as a filming location for the 2019 HBO miniseries Chernobyl. The popularity of the series caused tourism to the site to greatly increase. "Tickets to tour the Ignalina plant, priced at 60 euros ($66) each, are booked up months ahead", according to Time.

== See also ==
- Energy in Lithuania
- List of power stations in Lithuania
- Nuclear power in the European Union
