= European Network of Transmission System Operators for Electricity =

Organization representing European transmission system operators

- Abbreviation: ENTSO-E
- Predecessor: ETSO, UCTE, NORDEL, ATSOI, UKTSOA, BALTSO
- Formation: 19 December 2008; 17 years ago
- Type: Association
- Legal status: AISBL
- Purpose: ENTSO-E promotes closer cooperation across Europe's TSOs to support the implementation of EU energy policy and achieve Europe's energy and climate policy objectives, which are changing the very nature of the power system
- Headquarters: Rue de Spa 8 Brussels, Belgium
- Region served: Europe
- Members: Transmission system operators
- Main organ: ENTSO-E Assembly
- Website: www.entsoe.eu

The European Network of Transmission System Operators for Electricity (ENTSO-E) is an association representing 40 electricity transmission system operators (TSOs) from 36 countries across Europe, thus extending beyond EU borders. It manages the Continental Europe Synchronous Area (CESA). ENTSO-E was established and given legal mandates by the EU's Third Package for the Internal energy market in 2009, which aims at further liberalising the gas and electricity markets in the EU. Ukrainian Ukrenergo became the 40th member of the association on 1 January 2024.

== History ==
Creation of ENTSO-E was initiated by the adoption of the European Union third legislative package on the gas and electricity markets. In 2003, the European Commission conducted a sector inquiry concerning the competition of electricity market in six European countries. Examining competition in these countries, the final report stated serious issues to be solved. It was noticed that the integration between member state's markets is still insufficient. Additionally, the absence of transparently available market information was assessed. As a result, the third legislative package on the EU gas and electricity markets was adopted by the European Commission in September 2007.

On 27 June 2008, 36 European electricity transmission system operators (TSOs) signed a declaration of intent in Prague to create the ENTSO-E. ENTSO-E was established on 19 December 2008 in Brussels by 42 TSOs as a successor of six regional associations of the electricity transmission system operators. ENTSO-E became operational on 1 July 2009. The former associations ETSO, ATSOI, UKTSOA, NORDEL, UCTE and BALTSO became a part of the ENTSO-E, while still offering data by their predecessors for public interest. Until then, the Union for the Coordination of Transmission of Electricity (UCTE) was the main organization managing what is now the Continental Europe Synchronous Area.

== Objectives ==
According to its website, "ENTSO-E promotes closer cooperation across Europe’s TSOs to support the implementation of EU energy policy and achieve Europe’s energy & climate policy objectives, which are changing the very nature of the power system. The main objectives of ENTSO-E centre on the integration of renewable energy sources (RES) such as wind and solar power into the power system, and the completion of the internal energy market (IEM), which is central to meeting the European Union’s energy policy objectives of affordability, sustainability and security of supply. [...] ENTSO-E aims to be the focal point for all technical, market and policy issues relating to TSOs and the European network, interfacing with power system users, EU institutions, regulators and national governments."

== Members ==
TSOs are responsible for the bulk transmission of electric power on the main high voltage electric networks. TSOs provide grid access to the electricity market players (i.e., generating companies, traders, suppliers, distributors, and directly connected customers) according to non-discriminatory and transparent rules. In many countries, TSOs are in charge of the development of the grid infrastructure, too. TSOs in the European Union internal electricity market are entities operating independently from the other electricity market players (unbundling).

On 14 January 2016 TEİAŞ signed an agreement with ENTSO-E to become first observer member, the agreement expired in January 2019. On 13 December 2022 TEİAŞ signed a new Observer Membership Agreement that will run for a period of three years.

On 12 February 2021, three Great Britain based operators left due to Brexit, with only Northern Ireland's SONI from the UK remaining.

On 26 April 2022 Ukrenergo signed an observer membership agreement and became the 40th member of ENTSO-E on 1 January 2024.

Since January 2024, ENTSO-E contains 40 Member TSOs from 36 countries.

ISO country code	Country	TSO	Abbr.
AL	Albania	Operatori i Sistemit te Transmetimit	OST
AT	Austria	Austrian Power Grid AG	APG
AT	Austria	Vorarlberger Übertragungsnetz	VUEN
BA	Bosnia and Herzegovina	BiH Independent System Operator	NOS BiH
BE	Belgium	Elia Transmission Belgium	Elia
BG	Bulgaria	Elektroenergien Sistemen Operator	ESO
HR	Croatia	Croatian Transmission System Operator	HOPS
CY	Cyprus	Cyprus Transmission System Operator	Cyprus TSO
CZ	Czechia	ČEPS	ČEPS
DK	Denmark	Energinet	
EE	Estonia	Elering	
FI	Finland	Fingrid	
FR	France	Réseau de Transport d'Électricité	RTE
DE	Germany	TransnetBW	TNG
DE	Germany	Tennet TSO	TTG
DE	Germany	Amprion	
DE	Germany	50Hertz Transmission	50Hertz
GR	Greece	Independent Power Transmission Operator	IPTO (or ADMIE)
HU	Hungary	MAVIR Magyar Villamosenergia-ipari Átviteli Rendszerirányító ZRt.	MAVIR
IS	Iceland	Landsnet	
IE	Ireland	EirGrid	
IT	Italy	Terna	
LV	Latvia	Augstsprieguma tīkls	AST
LT	Lithuania	Litgrid	
LU	Luxembourg	Creos Luxembourg	
MK	North Macedonia	MEPSO	
ME	Montenegro	Crnogorski elektroprenosni sistem AD	CGES
NL	Netherlands	TenneT	TTN
NO	Norway	Statnett	
PL	Poland	Polskie Sieci Elektroenergetyczne	PSE
PT	Portugal	Redes Energéticas Nacionais	REN
RO	Romania	Transelectrica	
RS	Serbia	Elektromreža Srbije	EMS
SK	Slovakia	Slovenská elektrizačná prenosová sústava	SEPS
SI	Slovenia	Elektro-Slovenija	ELES
ES	Spain	Red Eléctrica de España	REE
SE	Sweden	Svenska Kraftnät	SVK
CH	Switzerland	Swissgrid	Swissgrid
NI	Northern Ireland	System Operator for Northern Ireland	SONI
UA	Ukraine	Ukrenergo	Ukrenergo

=== Observers ===
ISO country code	Country	TSO	Abbr.
TR	Turkey	Turkish Electricity Transmission Corporation	TEİAŞ
MD	Moldova	Moldelectrica	Moldelectrica

== Geographical area ==
Map of the extent (excluding the British Grid)

The geographical area covered by ENTSO-E's member TSOs is divided into three synchronous areas (Continental, Nordic and Irish) and two isolated systems (Cyprus and Iceland). Synchronous areas are groups of countries that are connected via their respective power systems. The system frequency (50 Hz, with usually very minor deviations) is synchronous within each area, and a disturbance at one single point in the area will be registered across the entire zone. Individual synchronous areas are interconnected through direct current interconnectors.

The benefits of synchronous areas include pooling of generation capacities, common provisioning of reserves, both resulting in cost-savings, and mutual assistance in the event of disturbances, resulting in cheaper reserve power costs (for instance in case of a disturbance or outage).

== Legal basis ==
- The Third Energy Package and Regulation (EC) No 714/2009 (Note: Regulation (EC) No 714/2009 of the European Parliament and of the Council of 13 July 2009 on conditions for access to the network for cross-border exchanges in electricity and repealing Regulation (EC) No 1228/2003. No longer in force, Date of end of validity: 31/12/2019; Repealed by 32019R0943.): on conditions for access to the network for cross-border exchanges in electricity regulation stipulate ENTSO-E's tasks and responsibilities.
- Regulation (EU) 838/2010: on guidelines relating to the inter-TSO compensation mechanism sets out the methodology by which TSOs receive compensation for the costs incurred in hosting cross-border flows of electricity.
- Regulation (EU) 347/2013: on guidelines for trans-European energy infrastructure defines European Projects of Common Interest (PCIs) identifies ENTSO-E's ten-year network development plan (TYNDP) as the basis for the selection of PCIs. ENTSO-E is also mandated to develop a corresponding cost–benefit methodology for the assessment of transmission infrastructure projects.
- The Transparency Regulation (EU) No. 543/2013: on submission and publication of data in electricity markets makes it mandatory for European Member State data providers and owners to submit fundamental information related to electricity generation, load, transmission, balancing, outages, and congestion management for publication through the ENTSO-E Transparency Platform.

ENTSO‑E does not class as a "public sector body" under the meaning provided in the 2019 Open Data Directive.

== Key activities ==
=== Pan-European Transmission Network plans and cost–benefit analysis ===
The ten-year network development plan (TYNDP) is drafted by ENTSO-E, in close cooperation with stakeholders, under scrutiny of ACER and is finally adopted by the European Commission. It is the only existing pan-European network development plan. It is the basis for the selection of EU projects of common interest (PCIs). The list of PCIs is not fixed by ENTSO-E and is subject to a different process led by the European Commission and EU Member States.

The TYNDP is updated every two years. For inclusion in the TYNDP, each project, whether transmission or storage, has to go through a cost–benefit analysis. The benefit analysis methodology is developed by ENTSO-E in consultation with stakeholders and adopted by the European Commission. It assesses projects against socio-economic and environmental criteria.

=== Adequacy Outlooks ===
ENTSO-E publishes summer and winter adequacy outlooks, as well as a mid-term resource adequacy assessment, the European Resource Adequacy Assessment (ERAA). The seasonal outlooks assess if there is enough generation to cover supply and highlight possibilities for neighbouring countries to contribute to the generation/demand balance in critical situations in a specific country. The ERAA analyses resource adequacy on the decade ahead, accounting for investment and retirement decisions.

=== Network codes ===
ENTSO-E's network codes are binding pan-European rules drafted by ENTSO-E in consultation with stakeholders, with guidance from ACER. Network codes are grouped in three areas:

- connection codes connecting electricity generators, demand, and direct current lines to the transmission grids;
- operational codes governing how the pan-European electricity systems are operated;
- and market codes facilitating and harmonising electricity trading across European borders.

The drafting and adoption process of network codes is defined by the Third Package. ACER develops a framework guideline setting the policy choices for each code. On this basis, the codes are drafted by ENTSO-E in consultation with stakeholders. After ACER's opinion and recommendation for adoption, each code is submitted to the European Commission for approval through the Comitology process, i.e., to be voted on by Member State representatives and thus to become EU law, directly binding and implemented across all Member States.

=== Transparency Platform (TP) ===
ENTSO-E's Central Information Transparency Platform provides free access to fundamental data and information on pan-European wholesale energy generation, transmission, and consumption.

=== Research, development, and innovation (RDI) ===
ENTSO-E's R&D Roadmap provides the ENTSO-E vision on grid projects to be carried out by TSOs to meet EU objectives. The roadmap is supported by the annual R&D Implementation Plan, which combines both top-down and bottom-up approaches in meeting the requirements of the roadmap. ENTSO-E publishes annually a R&D Monitoring Report that assesses the progress of TSO-related R&D work.

== Governance ==
ENTSO-E is an international non-profit association (AISBL) established according to Belgian law. ENTSO-E is financed by its members. The TSOs contribute to the budget according to the number of countries and the population served.

The highest body of ENTSO-E is the Assembly, which is composed of representatives at CEO level of all the currently 43 members. The ENTSO-E Board is elected every two years from the overall membership and through the Assembly. It includes 12 representatives. The president, vice president, and committee chairs are invited to board meetings. The board coordinates the committees and LRG work and implements Assembly decisions.

ENTSO-E has established four specialized committees composed of managers from member TSOs. Each committee leads a number of regional groups and working groups.

At the same level as the four committees, the transversal Legal & Regulatory Group advises all ENTSO-E bodies on legal and regulatory issues. In addition, expert groups on data, network codes implementation, and EU affairs provide specific expertise and work products to the association.

ENTSO-E's Secretariat is based in Brussels. It is headed by the secretary-general and represents ENTSO-E to the European institutions, regulators, and stakeholders.

=== Organizational chart ===
As of March 2026, the management team is as follows:

Position	Name
Assembly and Board
President of the Assembly	Zbyněk Boldiš
Vice-President of the Assembly	Susana de Almeida de Graaff
Chair of the Board	Damian Cortinas
Vice Chair of the Board	Tahir Kapetanovic
Secretariat Management
Secretary General	Sonya Twohig
Head of People, Talent & Culture Section	Evelyne Driane
Head of Market and Operations Section	Bruno Gouverneur
Head of System Development Section	Edwin Haesen
Head of Corporate Services Section	Bertrand Macabeo
Head of Member Relations Section	Cara McLaughlin
General Counsel	Florence Melchior
Head of ICT Section	Nicolas Richet
Head of Legal Section	Ivan Taleski
Head of Policy, Communications and Stakeholder Management Section	Christelle Verstraeten
Head of Innovation Section	Antony Zegers

== Key figures (2022) ==
- 39 transmission system operators
- 35 European countries
- 532 million customers served
- 312,693 kilometres (194,298 mi) of transmission lines
- 3,174.2 TWh electricity transported
- 423,586 GWh of electricity exchange between member TSOs
- 1,023,721 MW net generation capacity connected to the grid

== See also ==
- EURELECTRIC
- Agency for the Cooperation of Energy Regulators
- European Energy Community
- European Network of Transmission System Operators for Gas (ENTSOG)
- IPS/UPS – TSO organization for the networks of most of the former Soviet republics and Mongolia
- SuperSmart Grid, European super grid
- Nord Pool
