= IPS/UPS =

Wide area synchronous transmission grid

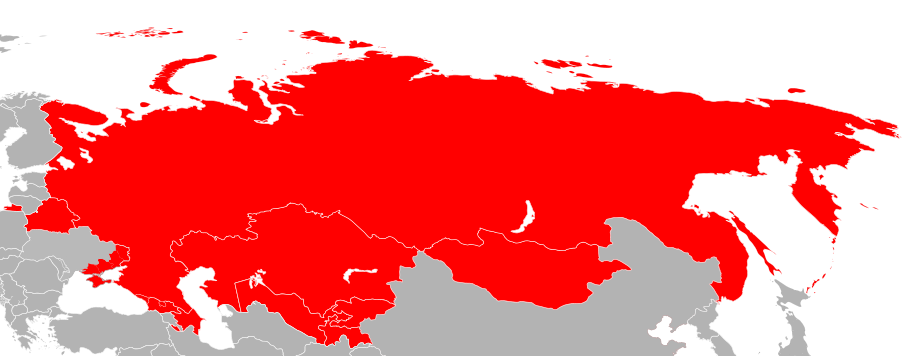
- IPS/UPS in red

Location
- Country: Russia; Belarus; Kazakhstan; Kyrgyzstan; Uzbekistan; Tajikistan; Azerbaijan; Georgia; Mongolia

Ownership information
- Owner: AO "SO UPS" (АО «СО ЕЭС»)

Technical information
- Type: Wide area synchronous transmission grid
- Current type: HVAC

The IPS/UPS (Russian: ЕЭС/ОЭС), also widely known as the Russian grid, is a wide area synchronous transmission grid, the Russian Unified Power System (UPS; Единая энергетическая система России [ЕЭС], Yedinaya energeticheskaya sistema Rossii) and the Integrated Power System (IPS; Объединенная энергетическая система [ОЭС], Ob"yedinennaya energeticheskaya sistema) portion of the network being the national networks of Azerbaijan, Belarus, Georgia, Kazakhstan, Kyrgyzstan, Mongolia, Tajikistan and Uzbekistan.

It has an installed generation capacity of 300 gigawatts, and produces 1,200 terawatt-hours (TWh) per year for its 280 million customers. The system spans eight time zones.

== Background ==
The development of electric power industry and power lines in the Soviet Union (USSR) was associated with the GOELRO plan. Subsequently the connection of the lines of the republics including the Russian Soviet Federative Socialist Republic was organized into the "United Energy System" (UES) of the USSR.

On 25 July 1962, within the framework of the Council for Mutual Economic Assistance (Comecon), the Soviet Union, Bulgaria, Czechoslovakia, Hungary, the German Democratic Republic, Poland and Romania signed an Agreement in Moscow, to establish a Central Dispatch Office for the united energy systems of these countries in Prague. According to the agreement, the power systems of these countries were interconnected and operated synchronously with the Unified Power System of the USSR under the Unified Power System "Mir" framework.

As a result of the dissolution of the USSR, the UES of the USSR was de jure divided, but de facto and physically continued to function, including with subordination to the center in Prague. In November 1993, due to a large capacity deficit in Ukraine, the "UES of Russia" and the "IPS of Ukraine" were involuntarily switched to separate operation, which resulted in the termination of parallel operations with the power systems of other participant countries of the Central Dispatch Control in Prague. As a result, the "Mir" energy association was split into several parts. Subsequently, energy system of East Germany VEAG in September 1995 joined for parallel operation with the energy system of Western Europe UCTE, and by October 1995 UCTE expanded further east, which included the energy systems of Poland, Hungary, Czech Republic and Slovakia. The Burshtyn Energy Island had left IPS/UPS and IES of Ukraine on 1 July 2002 and switched to synchronous operation with the UCTE grid.

At the Russia–European Union Summit in October 2001, Russian President Vladimir Putin and European Council President Guy Verhofstadt noted that the goal of interconnecting the power grids of Russia and Europe was in the mutual interest of both parties. In 2003, the CIS Electricity Council (CIS EEC) and UCTE adopted a decision to prepare a feasibility study. The research, conclusions and recommendations were published in 2008.

== Unified Power System of Russia ==
The Russian portion of the interconnection is known as Unified Power System of Russia (UPS; Russian: Единая энергетическая система России (ЕЭС)) and currently consists of 75 regional energy systems, which, in turn, form 7 unified energy systems or regional transmission operators:

1. UPS Center (Центр) - covering Central Federal District
2. UPS South (Юг) - covering Southern Federal District and North Caucasian Federal District
3. UPS North-West (Северо-Запад) - covering Northwestern Federal District (including Kaliningrad as a power island)
4. UPS Middle Volga (Средняя Волга) - covering Volga Federal District
5. UPS Ural (Урал) - covering Ural Federal District
6. UPS Siberia (Сибирь) - covering Siberian Federal District
7. UPS East (Восток) - covering Far Eastern Federal District

The current UPS of Russia structure came into existence as a result of Resolution of the Government of the Russian Federation from 11.07.2001 No. 526 "On the reform of the electric power industry of the Russian Federation". Up until 1 July 2008 RAO UES operated UPS. It is currently being operated by the Federal Grid Company (FGC UES) of Russia. The Unified Power System came into existence around 1956, when the power systems of Center and Middle Volga were interconnected. By 1978, the unified power system included all of the Soviet Union except Central Asia.

== IPS and synchronous operations ==
The Integrated Power System (IPS, Объединенная энергетическая система (ОЭС)) portion of the network currently includes the national networks of Azerbaijan, Belarus, Georgia, Kazakhstan, Kyrgyzstan, Mongolia, Tajikistan and Uzbekistan.

The following IPS networks are currently connected to the following UPS Russia systems:

1. IPS Azerbaijan and IPS Georgia – connected with UPS South
2. IPS Belarus – connected with UPS North-West and UPS Center
3. IPS Kazakhstan – connected with UPS Ural and UPS Siberia
4. IPS Kyrgyzstan, IPS Tajikistan and IPS Uzbekistan – connected with IPS Kazakhstan
5. IPS Mongolia – connected with UPS Siberia

Key to box background colors:

- Currently connected to IPS/UPS
- Managed by IPS/UPS, but operates as a power island

The dashed line indicates past connections.

(Russia) North-west
Belarus
(Russia) Kaliningrad	(Russia) Center	(Russia) Ural	(Russia) Siberia	(Russia) East
(Russia) Middle Volga	Mongolia
Kazakhstan
(Russia) South	Kyrgyzstan
Uzbekistan
(Georgia (country)) Georgia	Azerbaijan	Tajikistan

=== Azerbaijan and Georgia ===
As of 2020, the electric power companies of Russia, Azerbaijan and Georgia were working toward completion of the Russia-Azerbaijan-Georgia-Russia electricity ring.

=== Central Asia ===
Historically, the Integrated Power System of Central Asia was formed in 1960 on the territory of Uzbek SSR, Tajik SSR, Turkmen SSR, Kyrgyz SSR and five neighboring regions of southern Kazakh SSR. Currently, IPS Kazakhstan operates synchronously with the UPS of Russia and the Integrated Power System of Central Asia. The parties can carry out interstate supplies of electricity and provide services. During the Soviet era, North Kazakhstan maintained a separate power system, not connected to South Kazakhstan and the Central Asian power system.

The IPS of Central Asia and South Kazakhstan (its full and formal name) worked isolated from the Unified Power System of the Soviet Union, independently regulated frequency and other regime parameters in the IPS and dispatch control was carried out from a single center, which was located in Tashkent. The Ministry of Energy of Uzbekistan notes that since the 70s, when the 500 kV lines were united into a single ring, none of the power systems-owners (Kazakhstan, Kyrgyzstan, Uzbekistan) has left the mode of their joint synchronous operation.

The Integrated Power System of Central Asia is a block of power systems interconnected by 220 and 500 kV lines, operating in parallel with the UPS of Russia through the networks of Kazakhstan. The block includes the southern part of UPS of Kazakhstan, power systems of Uzbekistan, Tajikistan, Kyrgyzstan and Turkmenistan. The dispatcher of the southern power system of Central Asia was (and still is) the Coordinating Dispatch Center Energia located in Tashkent.

The interconnection of northern and southern Kazakhstan power systems with IPS Central Asia is ensured by a 500 kV North-East-South Kazakhstan power transmission line. Its transmission capacity until January 2022 was sufficient to cover power flows during peak loads. However, in January 2022, as KEGOC reported as a result of the emergency imbalance created by the energy system of Central Asian countries, massive blackouts occurred throughout Central Asia. Northern Kazakhstan is very closely connected to UPS Russia. Starting from Karaganda towards the south of Kazakhstan, the transmission capacity is decreasing. New capacity needs to be commissioned every year to meet the growing demand and avoid blackouts.

Central Asian countries (excluding Turkmenistan) were added to the integrated system in 2001. In 2009, due to a major electrical fault in Tajikistan, Uzbekistan unilaterally disconnected from the system resulting also in the disconnection of Tajikistan. In 2018, Uzbekistan returned to IPS/UPS. At the end of 2021, Tajikistan decided to return to the power system and it returned in June 2024.

=== Mongolia ===
Mongolia was first linked to IPS/UPS around 1974.

=== Former ===
==== Armenia ====
The first time the power systems of the three Transcaucasian republics were connected and synchronized was in Akstafa (Azerbaijan) in 1960. Until 1970, the Integrated Power System of Transcaucasia, which operated separately from the power system of the European part of the USSR, was managed by the Joint Dispatch Control Center of the North Caucasus. In January 1970, the Joint Dispatch Control Center of Transcaucasia (in Tbilisi, Georgia) was established, which included the power systems of Georgia, Azerbaijan and Armenia.

In 1970, the 220 kV Dagomys–Bzybi line was put into operation. This line connected the Integrated Power System of Transcaucasia to the Unified Power System of the European part of the country for synchronous operation. Operational management was carried out from the control center located in Tbilisi, Georgia. Until 1991, the Armenian power system was part of the Integrated Power System of Transcaucasia.

==== BRELL Agreement ====
The BRELL Agreement (BRELL standing for "Belarus, Russia, Estonia, Latvia, Lithuania") was a 2001–2025 arrangement by which the five countries of Belarus, Russia, Estonia, Latvia, and Lithuania agreed on the technical management of the synchronization of their power grids as part of the IPS/UPS power distribution system. The IPS/UPS integration for the electricity systems of Belarus, Estonia, Latvia and Lithuania with Russia had originally been established during the 1960s in the Soviet Union.

On 8 February 2025, the three Baltic states permanently disconnected from IPS/UPS and integrated into the continental European grid. Prior to 2025, the Baltic states already had HVDC interconnectors with the Continental Europe Synchronous Area (CESA) (500 MW LitPol Link (Lithuania–Poland)) and the Nordic synchronous grid (700 MW NordBalt (Lithuania–Sweden), and 350 MW and 650 MW Estlink submarine power cables (Estonia–Finland)). Following the end of the BRELL agreement and disconnection from Russian power sources, the Russian exclave Kaliningrad became a power island disconnected from Belarus.

==== Moldova and Ukraine ====
In early 2021, Ukraine announced that it would be disconnecting from Russia and Belarus by the end of 2023 and integrating into the continental European grid. In February 2022, Ukraine accelerated what had so far been a future planned program and executed a total disconnection from IPS/UPS due to the Russian invasion of Ukraine, also disconnecting Moldova in the process. Ukrenergo reported that "Ukraine completely disconnected from the Russian and Belarusian energy systems on the night of 24 February and is operating in an autonomous mode." In August, a Ukrainian representative said that "the agreement between the Cabinet of Ministers of Ukraine and the Government of the Russian Federation on measures to ensure parallel operation of the Integrated Energy System of Ukraine and the Unified Energy System of the Russian Federation, signed on 12 July 2012, has been terminated". The system operator of the Unified Energy System of Russia confirmed that the parallel operation of the energy systems of Ukraine and Russia was terminated on 24 February 2022.

In early March 2022, Ukraine completed an emergency synchronization with the European grid. The Burshtyn Energy Island however in the past had left IPS/UPS on 1 July 2002 and switched to synchronous operation with the Europe wide UCTE grid.

==== Turkmenistan ====
In 2009, disconnection of Uzbekistan from IPS/UPS resulted in Turkmenistan's disconnection from IPS/UPS. Uzbekistan however in 2018 rejoined IPS/UPS. Turkmenistan has since 2009 been connected to the Iranian nation grid, but maintains connection lines with IPS Uzbekistan with the Qorakoʻl-Gyzylarbat overhead line via 220 kV, and as of 2022, also a second overhead line via 220 kV from Tallimarjon in Uzbekistan.

== Supplies in synchronous mode and proposed synchronization ==
=== Afghanistan ===
The North-Eastern Power System of Afghanistan (NEPS) receives electricity from Uzbekistan via 220 kV Surkhan-Naibabad overhead line and from Tajikistan via 220 kV Sangtuda-Kunduz overhead line. Synchronous operation of IPS Central Asia with the North-Eastern Power System of Afghanistan (NEPS) and South-Eastern Power System (SEPS) where Afghanistan's generating capacity is concentrated, is prohibited due to problems with sustainability. If the issue of interconnection of the eastern power systems of Afghanistan (NEPS and SEPS) are to be considered, then the synchronous operation of the Afghanistan power system with the IPS Central Asia is possible.

Uzbekistan started construction of a new Surkhan-Puli Khumri-Khumri line, which will connect Afghanistan's power system to the integrated power system of Uzbekistan and Central Asia. Once the line is commissioned, Afghanistan's power system will be connected for the first time to work synchronously with the IPS of Central Asia.

=== Armenia and Iran ===
There have been proposals made to link Armenia and Iran to the IPS/UPS grid network. Currently Armenia and Turkmenistan remain linked to the Iran National Grid. Since Armenia has synchronized its power grid with Iran, the exchange of electricity between Georgia and Armenia requires the use of direct current interconnectors and are asynchronous.

The Executive Committee of the Electric Power Council of the Commonwealth of Independent States notes that since 2014 negotiations were held and a technical and economic feasibility study was developed for a project to synchronize the power systems of Iran, Armenia, Georgia and Russia, work on which began in 2016, after which it was frozen and resumed only in 2019. The agreement to develop a technical and economic feasibility study for the North-South energy corridor project with a total capacity of up to 1.2 GW, which is supposed to connect the power systems of Russia, Georgia, Armenia and Iran, was signed in September 2016.

In 2016, Armenia's Deputy Minister of Energy and Natural Resources Areg Galstyan said that the launch of the corridor "will ensure synchronous operation of the power systems of the four countries, as it was in Soviet era". As announced in 2016, a 500/400 kV substation will be built in Armenia in Ayrum village near the border with Georgia, where a DC connection will also be built, which will allow the power systems of Armenia and Georgia to transfer electricity in asynchronous mode. At the same time it was noted that synchronization of the energy systems of Armenia and Georgia can be prepared with the commissioning of a new power unit of the Armenian Nuclear Power Plant by 2027. In 2021, Iranian Energy Minister Ali-Akbar Mehrabian said at a meeting with Azerbaijan's ambassador in Tehran that he was ready to start synchronizing its power grid with Russia and Azerbaijan.

In 2023, Russia and Iran discussed the interconnection of power systems through two energy corridor projects: the Azerbaijan, Iran and Russia (AIR) project and the Russia, Armenia, Georgia and Iran (AGIR) project. Also in 2023, a 10 million euro financial agreement with the European Investment Bank was extended until 31 December 2027 to connect the energy systems of Armenia and Georgia near the border with Georgia by means of a 500/400/220 kV high-voltage direct current converter substation located in Ayrum.

As of 2024, Armenia is modernizing its infrastructure to interface with the power systems of Georgia and Iran. Both projects are being implemented within the framework of the concept of forming a North-South energy bridge that will connect the power systems of Armenia, Georgia, Iran and Russia. In 2024, Iran's Energy Minister, Abbas Aliabadi, proposed connecting Russia's electricity grid to the United Arab Emirates and Saudi Arabia through Iran.

== Asynchronous operations and HVDC links ==
HVDC links allow to transfer electricity in asynchronous mode without synchronization of the AC electrical grids.

=== Current ===
==== China ====
There have been proposals to interconnect the Russian grid to China and other Asian systems with HVDC links as part of an Asian Super Grid. Currently, northern Chinese grid operates together with the UPS East from Blagoveshchensk via direct current converters at the 500 kV Heihe substation, where electricity is transmitted from Russia to China in an island mode via alternating current transmission lines. The Amur-Heihe overhead transnational power line was constructed for increasing electricity exports from Russia to China and commissioned in 2012 with maximum capacity of 750 MW.

==== Turkey ====
Since the 1990s, Georgia has sold electricity to Turkey. In 2014, Inter RAO started supplying electricity from Russia to the energy system of Georgia for subsequent sale in Turkey. The supplies became possible after the commissioning of the 400 kV Akhaltsikhe-Borçka interstate power transmission line with a direct current insertion connecting the energy systems of Georgia and Turkey (Black Sea Transmission Network). By April 2015, the grid of Turkey was synchronised with the European CESA grid.

Russian electricity supplies to Turkey continue to be transported via Georgia. According to Inter RAO, exports to the Turkish market nearly quadrupled in 2025 compared to 2024, reaching 231 million kWh.

=== Former ===
==== Finland ====
On 30 September 1960, an agreement was signed to supply 200 megawatts electricity from the Soviet Union to Finland annually starting January 1961. Capacity was increased to 355 megawatts in 1981, to 710 megawatts in 1982 and 1065 megawatts in summer of 1984. In 2005, Russia and the EU considered unifying the IPS/UPS network with the ENTSO-E to form a single synchronous super grid spanning 13 time zones.

Between 1961 and 2022, IPS/UPS had a oneway interlink to the Nordic system via a back-to-back high-voltage direct current (HVDC) connection to Finland from Vyborg, Russia with a capacity of 1420 megawatts. Following the Russian invasion of Ukraine and the imposition of economic sanctions, on 13 May 2022, RAO Nordic released a statement saying Russia was halting the export of power to Finland due to lack of payment. Power transmission from Russia to Finland halted at 2200 GMT 13 May 2022.

==== Norway ====
In 2014, the Federal Grid Company proposed the possibility of building an energy bridge through Pechenga between Russia and Norway. According to the proposal, the organization of synchronous operation of the Russian and Norwegian power systems was not envisaged, and the power transfer was planned to be carried out through a direct current insertion on the Russian side. The energy bridge would significantly increase the reliability of power supply to the Norwegian province of Finnmark and a number of facilities in the Murmansk Oblast. It was reported that the Norwegian company Statnett SF had already confirmed and justified the feasibility of the Pechenga energy bridge with calculations.

As of 2011, limited electricity transmission to the Norwegian energy system was carried out by generators of Borisoglebsky hydroelectric station HPP-8 of the Paatsjoki River Hydroelectric Plants operating in isolation from the UES of Russia. As of 2019, Borisoglebsky HPP-8 transmitted electricity via L-225 export to Kirkenes in Norway.

=== Proposed ===
==== Afghanistan and Pakistan ====
The CASA-1000 project envisages supplying electricity from Kyrgyzstan and Tajikistan to Afghanistan and Pakistan through HVDC lines.

==== Romania ====
The Black Sea Energy submarine cable project will construct an electric cable connecting Georgia with Romania, from Anaklia in Georgia to Constanta, running 1,195 km, 1,100 km of which underwater. The high voltage direct current (HVDC) cable would have a voltage level of 500 kV and a capacity of 1,000-1,500 MW.

== See also ==
- Continental Europe Synchronous Area
- SuperSmart Grid
- European super grid
