= Synchronous grid of Northern Europe =

Electrical grid

Map of European Transmission System Operators Organizations (Regional Groups) Continental Europe, Nordic, Great Britain and Ireland/Northern Ireland (former UCTE, NORDEL, UKTSOA, ATSOI).

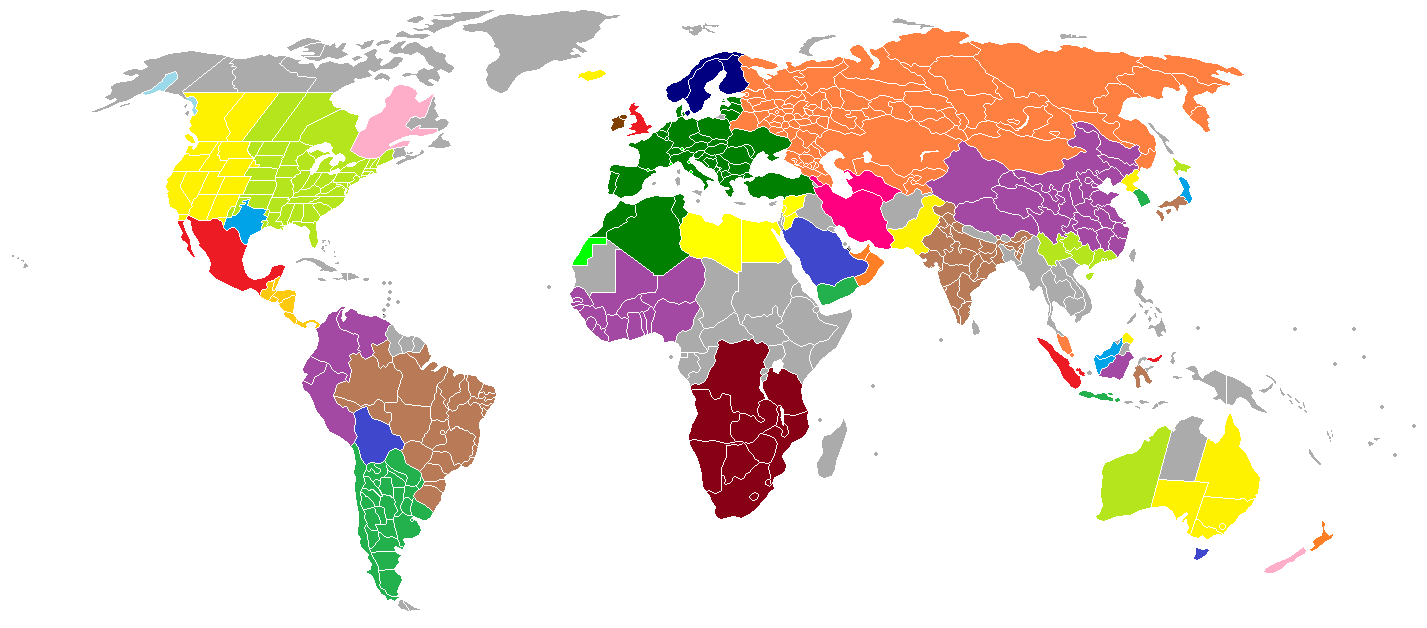
Map of synchronous grids

The Nordic System or Interconnected network of Northern Europe of ENTSO-E is a synchronous electrical grid composed of the electricity grids of Norway, Sweden, Finland and the eastern part of Denmark (Zealand with islands and Bornholm) since 2009. The grid was managed by Nordel from 1963 until 2009 as it was integrated into ENTSO-E. The grid is not synchronized with the Continental Europe Synchronous Area, but has several non-synchronous DC connections with that as well as other synchronous grids. Gotland is not synchronized with the Swedish mainland either, as it is connected by HVDC. The grid also has HVDC submarine power cable links with the Baltic States.

== DC Links ==
The Nordic system is connected to other synchronous areas by these links:

- NordLink, Norway to Germany
- Konti-Skan, Sweden-West Denmark Jutland
- Skagerrak, western Denmark (Jutland) - Norway
- Great Belt Power Link, Western Denmark (Jutland) - Eastern Denmark
- Baltic Cable, Sweden to Germany
- SwePol, Sweden to Poland
- NordBalt, Sweden to Lithuania
- NorNed, Norway to the Netherlands
- North Sea Link Norway to the UK
- Estlink, Finland to Estonia
- Kontek, eastern Denmark to Germany
