= Karlshamn Power Station =

Power station in Karlshamn Municipality, Blekinge, Sweden

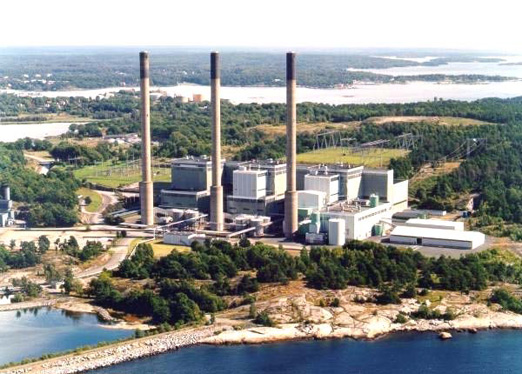
- Official name: Karlshamnsverket
- Country: Sweden
- Location: Karlshamn
- Coordinates: 56°9′8″N 14°49′57″E
- Status: Operational
- Commission date: 1969
- Owner: Sydkraft
- Operator: Karlshamn Kraft

Thermal power station
- Primary fuel: Fuel oil

Power generation
- Units operational: 2 x 335 MW
- Units decommissioned: 1 x 335 MW
- Nameplate capacity: 1,000 MW

External links
- Website: uniper.energy/sverige/reservkraft/karlshamnsverket
- Commons: Related media on Commons

Karlshamn Power Station (also known as Stärnö Power Station, Swedish: Karlshamnsverket) is an oil-fired thermal power station on Stärnö peninsula west of Karlshamn. It has had three units, each with a generation capacity of 340 MW, which went in service in 1969, 1971 and 1973. Unit 1 was closed in 2015. Each unit has its own 141 metres (463 ft) tall flue gas stack. The units feed 400 kV grid, but are only utilized as reserve power during shorter periods. Next to the power station, a converter station of the SwePol HVDC submarine cable is located.
