= LitPol Link =

Electricity link between Poland and Lithuania

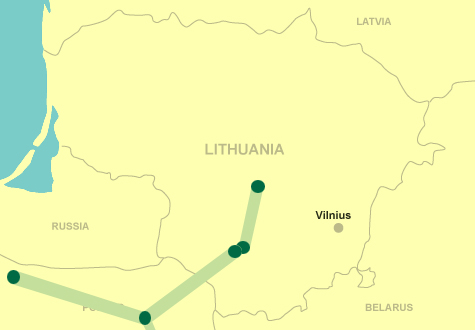

Location
- Country: Lithuania; Poland
- Coordinates: 54°47′56″N 24°15′19″E; 54°26′34″N 23°58′32″E; 54°26′19″N 23°58′02″E; 53°46′25″N 22°19′20″E; 53°01′38″N 23°02′43″E; 53°49′39″N 20°20′51″E
- General direction: south–north
- From: Kruonis
- Passes through: Alytus / Ełk
- To: Narew / Matki

Ownership information
- Owner: LitPol Link
- Partners: PSE; Litgrid

Construction information
- Construction started: 5 May 2014
- Construction cost: €340 million
- Commissioned: 9 December 2015

Technical information
- Type: overhead transmission line
- Current type: AC
- Total length: 341 km (212 mi)
- Capacity: 500 MW
- AC voltage: 330 kV in Lithuania; 400 kV in Poland
- No. of circuits: 2

LitPol Link is an electricity link between Poland and Lithuania which connects the Baltic power systems to the Continental Europe Synchronous Area. It has a capacity of 500 MW and since 2025 operates in a synchronous regime.

== History ==
In 2000, European Commission and the EBRD agreed to finance a feasibility study on the Poland–Lithuania transmission interconnection. The study was completed in September 2002. The connection is expected to increase Poland's electricity interconnection level from 2% to 4%. Parts of LitPol are on the EU "Projects of Common Interest" list in November 2015.

On 29 September 2006 Polish President Lech Kaczyński and Lithuanian President Valdas Adamkus signed a joint declaration on the joint power grid project during their meeting in Warsaw. The memorandum of understanding to establish a joint interconnection operator was signed between Lietuvos Energija and Polish PSE in Vilnius on 8 December 2006. Project Company Shareholding Agreement signed on 12 February 2008 in Warsaw. The joint project company LitPol Link was founded on 19 May 2008.

Aiming to build a 400 kV overhead line between Ełk and Łomża, PSE signed a contract with the Polish construction company PBE ELBUD Group on 12 September 2011. In early 2013, the Lithuanian transmission system operator Litgrid awarded ABB Group a $110 million contract to supply and install the first HVDC converter station in proximity of Alytus, Lithuania.

Construction of the link commenced in the Alytus district on 5 May 2014. LitPol electricity link started operations on 9 December 2015 the same day transmitting up to 200 MW power from Poland to Lithuania.

== Technical features ==
The interconnection comprises a 53-kilometre (33 mi) double-circuit 330 kV line from Kruonis to Alytus, a 1000 MW back-to-back converter in Alytus and 48-kilometre (30 mi) double-circuit 400 kV line from Alytus to the Lithuania–Poland border on the Lithuanian side, and a 106-kilometre (66 mi) double-circuit 400 kV line from the border to Ełk on Polish side.

According to the pre-feasibility study, the cost of the interconnection was estimated to be €237 million. With a view to enhancing existing energy infrastructure, including Poland–Germany and Poland–Czech Republic upgrades, the Polish TSO invested an additional €650 million and the Lithuanian TSO €262 million. The Lithuania–Poland interconnection has been designated an EU Trans-European Networks project. The interconnection initial capacity is 500 MW, with a transmission capacity upgrade of up to 1000 MW possible after completion of a second HVDC back-to-back station.

The tower 61 near Ełk, tower 160, tower 166 (both near Suwalki), and tower 293 near Sankury, have a height of 107 metres.

=== HVDC back-to-back station ===
Between 2015 and 2025, the line was connected to the HVDC back-to-back converter station, located in the Alytus, 600 metres (2,000 ft) southwest of the existing 330 kV-substation. It had two converters each rated for 500 MW transmission power. The facility is 200 metres (660 ft) long and 170 metres (560 ft) wide. Following the synchronization with CESA, the line is connected to the transformers and operates in synchronous mode. The converter however is still in place and may be useable for a power link to Belarus.

== Project company ==
LitPol Link was founded by PSE and Litgrid with equal stakes. The company is based in Warsaw. Acting Managing Director of LitPol Link Artūras Vilimas.

== See also ==
- Energy in Lithuania
- List of high-voltage transmission links in Lithuania
- Estlink (between Estonia and Finland)
- NordBalt (between Lithuania and Sweden)
- SwePol (between Poland and Sweden)
- Lithuania–Poland pipeline (natural gas interconnection between Lithuania and Poland)
- Harmony Link, subsea cable between Lithuania and Poland
- Baltic states synchronization with CESA
