= Elektromreža Srbije =

Serbian electricity transmission company

Coordinates: 44°45′17.7″N 20°29′20.6″E

- Official logo
- Native name: Електромрежа Србије
- Type: Joint-stock company
- Industry: Electric power transmission
- Founded: 1 July 2005; 21 years ago
- Headquarters: Kneza Miloša 11, Belgrade, Serbia
- Area served: Serbia
- Key people: Jelena Matejić (General director)
- Services: Electric power transmission
- Revenue: ▲€518.37 million (2022)
- Net income: ▲€70.28 million (2022)
- Total assets: ▲€956.22 million (2022)
- Total equity: ▲€664.62 million (2022)
- Owner: Government of Serbia (100%)
- Number of employees: 1,664 (2022)
- Subsidiaries: PD Elektroistok izgradnja d.o.o. Elektroistok Projektni biro d.o.o. SEEPEX a.d. Beograd
- Website: ems.rs
- Footnotes; Business ID: 20054182; Tax ID: 103921661

Elektromreža Srbije (EMS; Serbian Cyrillic: Електромрежа Србије, ЕМС) is a Serbian national transmission system operator company with the headquarters in Belgrade, Serbia.

It was founded in 2005 after being split from Elektroprivreda Srbije and it is specialized in the transmission of electrical power. It is a member of the European Network of Transmission System Operators for Electricity.

== History ==
On 1 July 2005, the electric power transmission division of Elektroprivreda Srbije was split from the company and established its own public enterprise subsidiary Elektromreža Srbije (EMS).

In November 2016, Elektromreža Srbije changed its legal form to joint-stock company with 100% of shares being owned by the Government of Serbia.

In March 2018, the European electricity transmission association ENTSO-E warned over delay of electric clocks throughout Europe's power network due to lower frequency, which was caused by the loss of electricity in the network. Namely, the loss was created due to political dispute between Serbia and Kosovo where the Kosovar power transmission company KOSTT took 113 GWh unauthorizedly from the network in the period of January–February 2018. Elektromreža Srbije has legal jurisdiction over Kosovar electricity transmission network, but due to political dispute, does not exercise full control over it. The direct loss of 113 GWh would amount to 24.86 million euros, as per average euro area electricity price (per KWh) of 22 eurocents for households in 2017.

On 21 April 2020, KOSTT formally joined the ENTSO-E following the vote and thus separated from Elektromreža Srbije.

== Market and financial data ==
As of 2022, Elektromreža Srbije posted a profit of 70.28 million euros and had 518.37 million euros of revenues.

== See also ==
- Elektroprivreda Srbije (EPS)
- Transmission system operator
- Electricity distribution companies by country
- European Network of Transmission System Operators for Electricity (ENTSO-E)
