= EbIX =

Non-profit European organisation

ebIX, the European forum for energy Business Information eXchange, was a non-profit European organisation that existed from 2002 until end of 2023. ebIX had the avowed objectives to advance, develop and standardise the use of electronic information exchange in the European downstream energy (electricity and gas) industry. The main focus of ebIX was data exchange between different market players in the internal European downstream energy markets for electricity and gas.

Former member countries of ebIX were Austria, Poland, Finland, Slovenia, Belgium, Switzerland, Denmark, the Netherlands, Germany, Norway and Sweden. In addition ebIX had observers from Estonia, Croatia, Slovakia, France, Makedonia, Bulgaria and in addition project members from Transmission System Operators and national associations of Distribution System Operators from several other European countries, such as Spain and Czechia.

The ebIX framework is implemented in a lot of participating and non-participating European countries and used by energy suppliers, Distribution System Operators and datahubs.

The work of ebIX is mainly transferred to the EU DSO entity and partly to the Joint Working Group of ENTSO-E and the EU DSO entity. All documents ebIX produced are available at the ebIX website till end of 2026.
