= Svenska kraftnät =

Swedish transmission system operator

- Company type: State owned
- Industry: Electricity
- Founded: 1992
- Headquarters: Sundbyberg, Sweden
- Area served: Sweden
- Key people: Per Eckemark (director-general)
- Services: Electric power transmission
- Owner: Government of Sweden
- Number of employees: 530
- Website: www.svk.se

Svenska kraftnät is an electricity transmission system operator in Sweden. It is current led by director-general Per Eckemark since 2025.

It is a state-owned public utility, which was created in 1992 by splitting the former government agency Vattenfall into a power generation and distribution company Vattenfall AB and a transmission company Svenska kraftnät. The company has its headquarters in Sundbyberg, near Stockholm in Sweden. Svenska kraftnät owns and manages 17500 km of power lines, 175 transformer - and switching stations as well as foreign connections with both alternating and direct current. Svenska kraftnät owns 28% of Nord Pool along with other Nordic and Baltic transmission system operators.

== Criticism ==
Svenska Kraftnät has been frequently criticised for mistakes, insufficient problem-solving, organisational dysfunction and lack of responsibility.

== See also ==
- Electricity sector in Sweden
- European Network of Transmission System Operators for Electricity
- ebiX
