= Continental Europe Synchronous Area =

European synchronous transmission grid

Map of European transmission system operators organizations (regional groups) in continental Europe, Nordic, Great Britain and Ireland/Northern Ireland (former UCTE, NORDEL, UKTSOA, ATSOI)

The Continental Europe Synchronous Area (CESA), formerly known as the UCTE grid, is the second largest synchronous electrical grid in the world, primarily operating in Europe. It is interconnected as a single phase-locked 50 Hz mains frequency electricity grid that supplies over 400 million customers in 32 countries, including most of the European Union.

The total installed capacity can be conservatively assessed at the end of 2025 at 1250 GW. The transmission system operators operating this grid formed the Union for the Coordination of Transmission of Electricity (UCTE), which became the European Network of Transmission System Operators for Electricity (ENTSO-E).

== Area ==
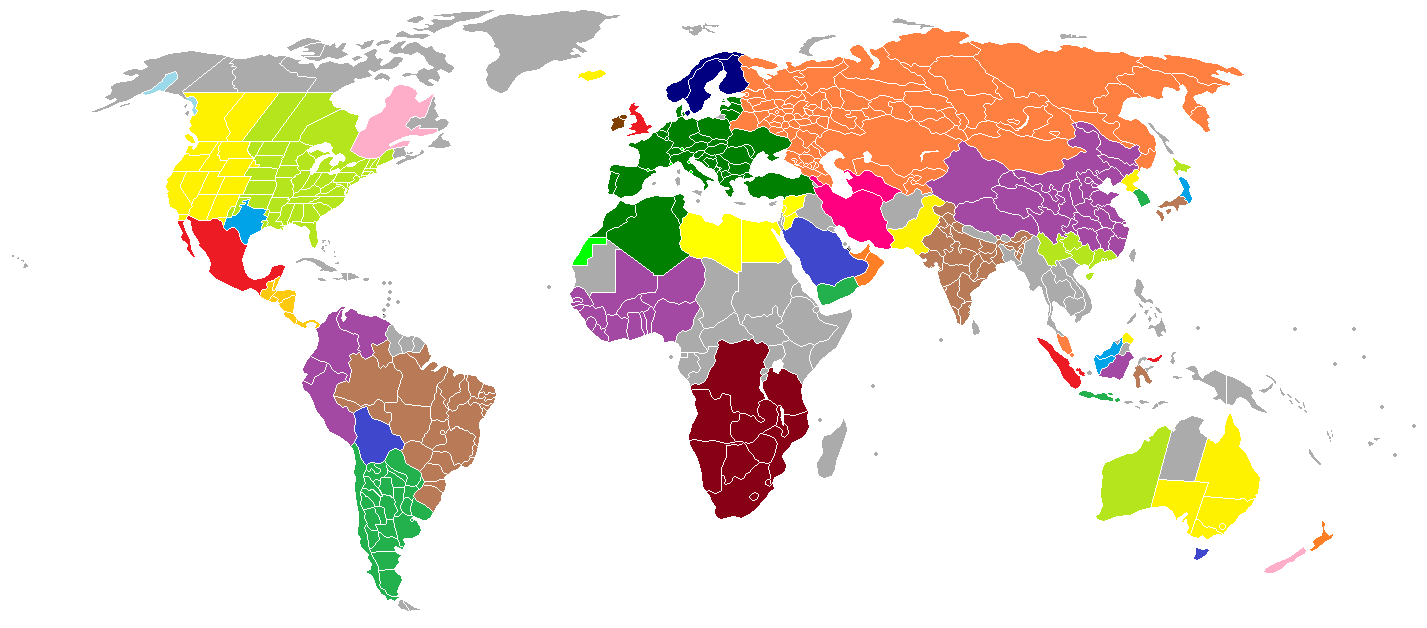
Map of synchronous grids, with the European grid shown in dark green

The synchronous grid of continental Europe covers territory of the ENTSO-E continental Europe regional group and some neighbouring countries not involved in the ENTSO-E. As of 2025, the synchronous grid includes all or parts of the following countries:

- Albania
- Algeria (Note: Synchronised. Not a member.)
- Andorra
- Austria
- Belgium
- Bosnia and Herzegovina
- Bulgaria
- Czech Republic
- Croatia
- Denmark (Note: Jutland only).
- Estonia
- France
- Germany
- Greece
- Hungary
- Italy
- Kosovo
- Latvia
- Liechtenstein
- Lithuania
- Luxembourg
- Malta
- Moldova
- Monaco
- Montenegro
- Morocco
- Netherlands
- Poland
- Portugal
- North Macedonia
- Romania
- San Marino
- Serbia
- Slovakia
- Slovenia
- Spain
- Switzerland
- Tunisia
- Turkey (Note: Since 2010.)
- Ukraine (Note: Since 2022.)
- Vatican City

The grids of Morocco, Algeria and Tunisia (which part of North African Power Pool) have been synchronized with the European grid since August 1997 through the Gibraltar AC link and form the South West Mediterranean Block..

In September 2010, the grid of Turkey was synchronized with the European grid via three 400 kV lines.

As of 2015, some national grids must be upgraded to handle increased power flows if the values of a free energy market are to be realised in the EU.

On 16 March 2022, three weeks after the Putin regime had begun its invasion of Ukraine, the ENTSO-E set up synchronisation with the networks of Ukraine (Ukrenergo) and Moldova (Moldelectrica) on an emergency basis to provide external support for the power supply in those countries. Plans for Ukraine to shift from the Russian grid to the European grid were already in progress, with an experimental separation from the Russian grid underway when the invasion occurred. Power exchange and integration gradually have increased, and by August 2022, 400–700 MW were sent from Ukraine to Eastern parts of EU.

The three Baltic states (Estonia, Latvia and Lithuania) (TSOs are respectively Elering, AST and Litgrid) disconnected from IPS/UPS on 8 February 2025 and on 9 February 2025 synchronised with the continental grid.

Although synchronous, some countries operate in a near island mode, with low connectivity to other countries. The European Commission has considered high connectivity to be beneficial, and has listed several interconnection projects as Projects of Common Interest.

== List of electricity interconnection levels ==
External images
- 2011 interconnection levels, and 2020 plans
- 2019 grid map

Electricity interconnection as percentage (EIL = electricity interconnection level) of installed electricity production capacity in 2014; with the EU aiming for a 15% interconnection by 2030.

Alternative formulas for calculating interconnection levels are based on peak load instead of installed capacity.

Some border transmissions, particularly around the Alps, have both high utilization rate and high price difference, implying that further transmission would be beneficial.

Country	EIL 2014	EIL 2017	EIL 2025	Capacity 2019 [GW]		Peak load 2018 [GW]	Interconnection level with	
Country	EIL 2014	EIL 2017	EIL 2025	Interconnection	Generation	Peak load 2018 [GW]	2002 method	1st Expert Group's method
Austria	29%		26%	11.8	21.3	12.1	55%	98%
Belgium	17%	19%	14%	8.6	23.1	13.5	37%	64%
Bulgaria	11%		22%	1.9	12.7	6.5	15%	29%
Croatia	69%		49%	3.2	5.0	3.2	64%	99%
Cyprus	0%		0%	0.0	1.5	1.0	0%	0%
Czech Republic	17%		26%	9.5	20.8	11.1	45%	85%
Denmark	44%	51%	37%	7.4	15.9	6.1	46%	121%
Estonia			60%	1.8	2.8	1.5	65%	120%
Finland	30%		15%	3.9	17.3	14.2	23%	28%
France	10%		5%	22.3	130.7	96.3	17%	23%
Germany	10%		10%	28.4	222.4	79.1	13%	36%
Greece	11%		6%	1.1	17.1	9.1	6%	12%
Hungary	29%		34%	6.4	9.1	6.6	70%	97%
Italy	7%		5%	11.0	94.4	57.6	12%	19%
Latvia			47%	2.0	2.8	1.3	71%	161%
Lithuania			39%	2.4	3.6	2.0	67%	121%
Luxembourg	245%		96%	1.1	0.3	1.0	409%	105%
Malta			39%	0.2	0.7	–	30%	–
Netherlands	17%	18%	7%	11.2	30.5	18.5	37%	61%
Norway				8.7	30.5	24.1	28%	36%
Poland	4%		4%	6.0	42.5	24.5	14%	24%
Portugal	7%		14%	4.0	19.6	8.7	20%	46%
Romania	7%		13%	2.2	18.8	8.9	12%	24%
Slovakia	61%		41%	5.5	7.6	4.5	73%	122%
Slovenia	65%		92%	4.7	3.7	2.4	127%	199%
Spain	2%		4%	7.6	104.7	40.6	7%	19%
Sweden	26%		11%	12.3	40.8	27.4	30%	45%
Switzerland				16.8	16.1	9.8	105%	172%

== Interconnections ==
HVDC connections around Europe. Red are existing, blue are proposed, green are approved.

The British grid is not synchronized with the continental Europe frequency, but it is interconnected using high-voltage direct current (HVDC) via the HVDC Cross-Channel (IFA), BritNed, Nemo Link, IFA-2, North Sea Link, Viking Link and ElecLink links. In 2024, the interconnectivity level reached 20%, with continued plans for strengthening in the future.

The networks of Ireland and Northern Ireland form the ENTSO-E Irish regional group, which is not yet interconnected with the continental Europe grid, but has DC interconnections with the British network through the HVDC East–West Interconnector, Moyle Interconnector and Greenlink. Ireland and France will be connected in 2028 by the 700 MW HVDC Celtic Interconnector.

Similarly, the Nordic regional group of ENTSO-E (former NORDEL), composed of Norway, Sweden, Finland and the eastern part of Denmark (Zealand with islands and Bornholm), is not synchronized with the continental Europe, but has a number of non-synchronous DC connections with the continental Europe grid. Gotland is not synchronized with the Swedish mainland, as it is connected by HVDC.

Prior to the Baltic states synchronization with CESA in 2025, the regional group of Lithuania, Latvia and Estonia was interconnected with the Nordic grid at an electricity interconnection level of 10% through the HVDC Estlink 1 and 2 cables and the NordBalt cable, which began operating in 2007, 2014, and 2015 respectively. The Baltic States also connect with the continental Europe grid through the Lithuania–Poland interconnection.

The networks of Iceland and Cyprus are not yet interconnected with the other grids. Malta is connected up to 35% via the Malta-Sicily interconnector, commissioned in 2015.

In 2024 Cyprus and Greece approved a high-voltage direct current sea cable to link their power grids. Nexans is building the cable and Siemens will be contracted to build the onshore transformers. The cable is planned to eventually continue from Cyprus to connect with Israel's electricity grid.

== See also ==
- SuperSmart Grid – proposal for a wide area synchronous grid combining European, IPS/UPS and Middle East networks
- Super grid
- European super grid
- Synchronous grid of Northern Europe
