= 2012 Lithuanian nuclear power referendum =

14 October 2012
- I support the construction of a new nuclear power plant in the Republic of Lithuania.

Results
Choice	Votes	%
Yes	463,966	35.23%
No	853,163	64.77%
Valid votes	1,317,129	96.77%
Invalid or blank votes	43,953	3.23%
Total votes	1,361,082	100.00%
Registered voters/turnout	2,588,418	52.58%

An advisory referendum on the construction of a new nuclear power station was held in Lithuania on 14 October 2012, alongside parliamentary elections. The proposal was rejected by 65% of voters.

== Background ==
The Ignalina Nuclear Power Plant, being of a similar design to the Chernobyl plant, was considered too dangerous by the European Commission and it was closed in 2009, as part of a deal agreed when Lithuania joined the EU in 2004. A referendum in 2008 had seen a large majority (89%) vote in favour of keeping the plant open, but the low turnout of 48% (with the threshold set at 50%) invalidated the result. After closing the Ignalina plant, the country became dependent on energy supplies from neighbouring Russia. Plans to build a new 1,350MW nuclear power plant at Visaginas by 2020–2022 were subsequently developed by the Lithuanian government together with Latvia, Estonia and the Japanese company Hitachi. Lithuania would own 38% of the plant, Estonia 22%, Latvia 20% and Hitachi 20%.

On 16 July the Seimas made a decision to hold an advisory referendum on the construction of the new plant by a vote of 62–39. The proposal to hold a referendum was opposed by the ruling Homeland Union – Lithuanian Christian Democrats, which accused opposition parties of seeking to make political capital out of the issue prior to the elections. Former President Valdas Adamkus described the decision to hold the referendum as "nonsense," asking "What if the nation decides against, and the government decides to build it?

== Results ==
Choice	Votes	%
For	463,966	35.23
Against	853,163	64.77
Invalid/blank votes	43,953	–
Total	1,361,082	100
Registered voters/turnout	2,588,418	52.58
Source: VRK
