= Polskie Sieci Elektroenergetyczne =

Operator of the electricity transmission grid in Poland

Polskie Sieci Elektroenergetyczne S.A.
- Founded: 1990
- Headquarters: Warsaw, Poland
- Revenue: 2,348,000,000 euro (2018)
- Net income: 113,900,000 euro (2018)
- Number of employees: 2,318 (2018)
- Website: www.pse.pl

Polskie Sieci Elektroenergetyczne S.A. (abbreviated PSE) is an electricity transmission system operator in Poland and the sole operator of the country's high-voltage transmission lines. It is 100% owned by the State Treasury.

Until 2007, PSE was a part of the PSE Group (now: Polska Grupa Energetyczna).

In 2012, the company’s total revenue amounted to nearly 7.1 billion PLN, with sales revenue close to 6.8 billion PLN.
