= Transmission system operator =

Energy transporter

Simplified diagram of AC electricity grid from generation stations to consumers in North America

A transmission system operator (TSO) is an entity entrusted with transporting energy in the form of natural gas or electrical power on a national or regional level, using fixed infrastructure. The term is defined by the European Commission. The certification procedure for transmission system operators is listed in Article 52 of the Electricity Directive 2019.

Due to the cost of establishing a transmission infrastructure, such as main power lines or gas main lines and associated connection points, a TSO is usually a natural monopoly, and as such is often subjected to regulations.

In electrical power business, a TSO is an operator that transmits electrical power from generation plants over the electrical grid to regional or local electricity distribution operators.

In natural gas business, a TSO receives gas from producers, transports it via pipeline through an area and delivers to gas distribution companies.

The United States has similar organizational categories: independent system operator (ISO) and regional transmission organization (RTO).

== Role in electrical power transmission ==
Safety and reliability are a critical issue for transmission system operators, since any failure on their grid or their electrical generation sources might propagate to a very large number of customers, causing personal and property damages. Natural hazards and generation/consumption imbalances are a major cause of concern. To minimize the probability of grid instability and failure, regional or national transmission system operators are interconnected to each other.

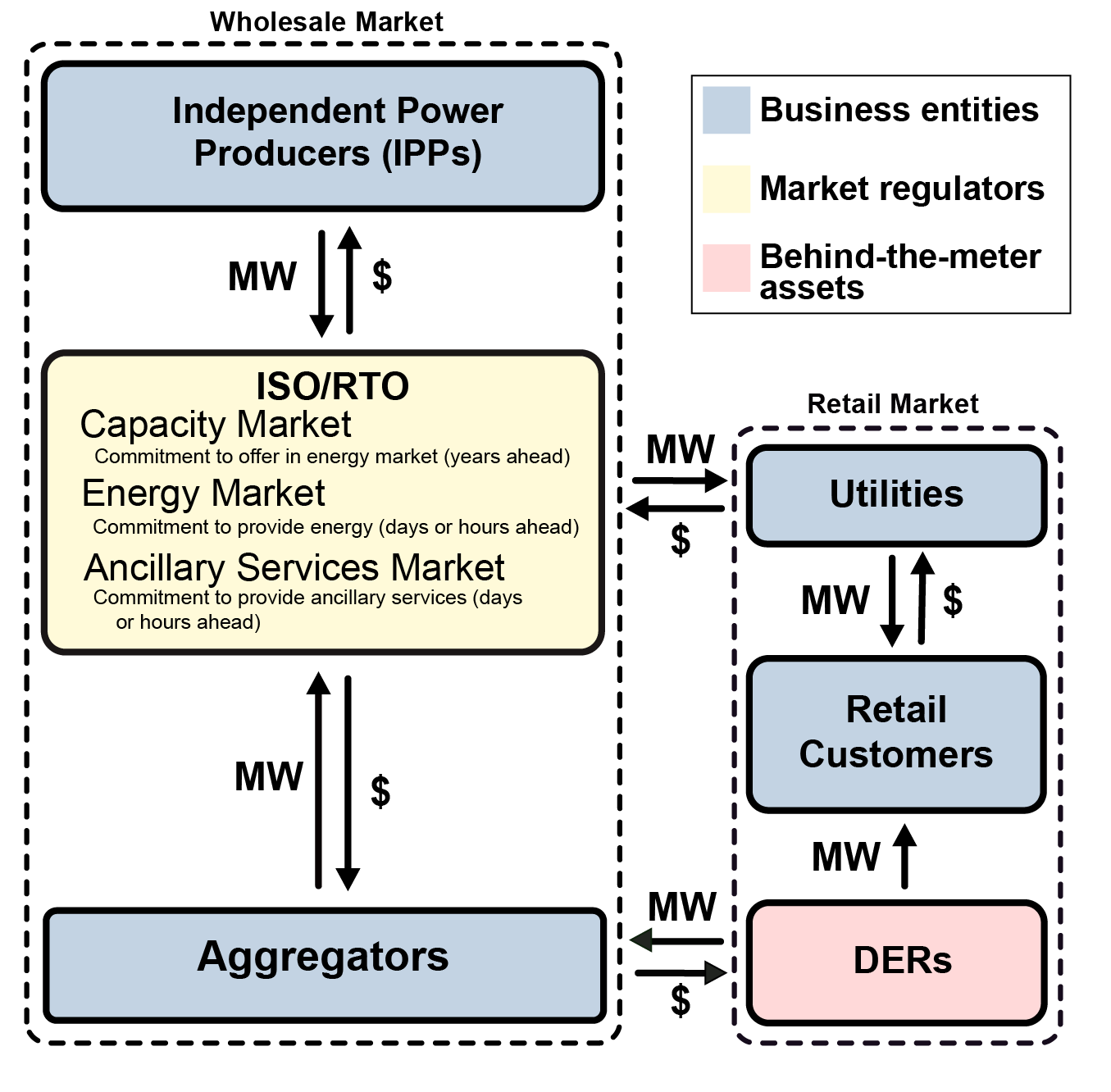
Interaction of wholesale and retail entities in an electricity market (managed by an ISO/RTO)

=== Electricity market operations ===
The role of the system operator in a wholesale electricity market is to manage the security of the power system in real time and co-ordinate the supply of and demand for electricity, in a manner that avoids fluctuations in frequency or interruptions of supply. The system operator service is normally specified in rules or codes established as part of the electricity market.

The system operator function may be owned by the transmission grid company, or may be fully independent. They are often wholly or partly owned by state or national governments. In many cases they are independent of electricity generation companies (upstream) and electricity distribution companies (downstream). They are financed either by the states or countries or by charging a toll proportional to the energy they carry.

The system operator is required to maintain a continuous (second-by-second) balance between electricity supply from power stations and demand from consumers, and also ensure the provision of reserves that will allow for sudden contingencies. The system operator achieves this by determining the optimal combination of generating stations and reserve providers for each market trading period, instructing generators when and how much electricity to generate, and managing any contingent events that cause the balance between supply and demand to be disrupted. System operations staff undertake this work using sophisticated energy modelling and communications systems.

In addition to its roles of real-time dispatch of generation and managing security, the system operator also carries out investigations and planning to ensure that supply can meet demand and system security can be maintained during future trading periods. Examples of planning work may include coordinating generator and transmission outages, facilitating commissioning of new generating plant and procuring ancillary services to support power system operation.

== Role in gas transmission ==
A gas TSO works for the functioning of the internal market and cross-border trade for gas and to ensure the optimal management, coordinated operation and sound technical evolution of the natural gas transmission network. Some gas TSOs also provide the marketplace for gas trading.

== See also ==
- European Network of Transmission System Operators for Electricity (ENTSO-E)
- European Network of Transmission System Operators for Gas (ENTSO-G)
- Regional transmission organization (North America) (RTO), also known as independent system operator (ISO)
- Mains electricity
- Mains electricity by country
- High-voltage direct current (HVDC)
- Electric power transmission
- Smart grid
- Super grid
