= List of high-voltage transmission links in Lithuania =

This is a list of high-voltage transmission links in Lithuania at voltages higher than 330 kV and/or the 400 kV-grid.

The list does not include links at smaller voltages like 110 kV or less.

== International links ==
Name	Substation 1	Substation 2	Total Length (km)	Volt (kV)	Power (MW)	Year	Remarks
Klaipėda–Grobiņa	Klaipėda	(Latvia) Grobiņa		330 kV		1977	
Panevėžys–Aizkraukle	Panevėžys	(Latvia) Aizkraukle		330 kV		1970	Connected to Plavinas HPS
Šiauliai–Jelgava	Šiauliai	(Latvia) Jelgava		330 kV		1962	Include additional link Mūša–Telšiai
Visaginas–Līksna	Visaginas	(Latvia) Līksna		330 kV			
LitPol Link	Alytus	(Poland) Ełk	341 km	330 kV, 400 kV	500 MW	2015	Synchronous link
Harmony Link	Darbėnai	(Poland) Żarnowiec		330 kV, 220 kV	700 MW	~2030	Planned second link between countries.
NordBalt	Klaipėda	(Sweden) Nybro	450 km	330 kV, 400 kV	700 MW	2015	±300 kV Voltage-Source Converter HVDC system

Former International Links

Name	Substation 1	Substation 2	Nation	Volt (kV)	Power (MW)	Year	Remarks
Alytus - Grodno	Alytus	Grodno	Belarus	330 kV			
Jurbarkas - Sovetsk	Jurbarkas	Sovetsk	Russia	330 kV			
Klaipėda - Sovetsk	Klaipėda	Sovetsk	Russia	330 kV			
Kruonis - Sovetsk	Kruonis PSP	Sovetsk	Russia	330 kV			
Vilnius - Maladzyeehna	Vilnius	Maladzyeehna	Belarus	330 kV			
Visaginas - Minsk	Visaginas	Minsk	Belarus	330 kV			
Visaginas - Polock	Visaginas	Polock	Belarus	330 kV			
Visaginas - Smorgon	Visaginas	Smarhon'	Belarus	330 kV			

== Local links ==
Name	Substation 1	Substation 2	Total Length (km)	Volt (kV)	Power (MW)	Year	Remarks
Klaipėda–Telšiai	Klaipėda	Telšiai	89 km	330 kV	900 MW	2014	
Kruonis–Jurbarkas	Kruonis	Jurbarkas		330 kV			Connected to Kruonis Pumped Storage Plant.
Kruonis–Šiauliai	Kruonis	Šiauliai		330 kV			Connected to Kruonis Pumped Storage Plant.
Lietuvos elektrinė – Alytus	Elektrėnai	Alytus		330 kV			Connected to Elektrėnai Power Plant.
Lietuvos elektrinė – Panevėžys	Elektrėnai	Panevėžys		330 kV			Connected to Elektrėnai Power Plant.
Lietuvos elektrinė – Kruonis	Elektrėnai	Kruonis		330 kV			Connection between Elektrėnai Power Plant and Kruonis Pumped Storage Plant.
Lietuvos elektrinė – Visaginas	Elektrėnai	Visaginas		330 kV			Connection between Elektrėnai Power Plant and Ignalina Nuclear Power Plant.
Lietuvos elektrinė – Vilnius	Elektrėnai	Vilnius		330 kV			Connected to Elektrėnai Power Plant.
Visaginas–Panevėžys	Visaginas	Panevėžys		330 kV			Connected to Ignalina Nuclear Power Plant.

=== Planned local links ===
Name	Substation 1	Substation 2	Total Length (km)	Volt (kV)	Power (MW)	Year	Remarks
Kruonis–Alytus	Kruonis	Alytus		330 kV			Connected to Kruonis Pumped Storage Plant.
Kruonis–Visaginas	Kruonis	Visaginas		330 kV			
Panevėžys–Mūša	Panevėžys	Mūša		330 kV			
Vilnius–Neris	Vilnius	Neris Station		330 kV			

== See also ==
- Baltic states synchronization with CESA
- List of power stations in Lithuania
- List of high-voltage transmission links in Sweden
