= Energy and Technology Museum =

- Energetikos ir technikos muziejus
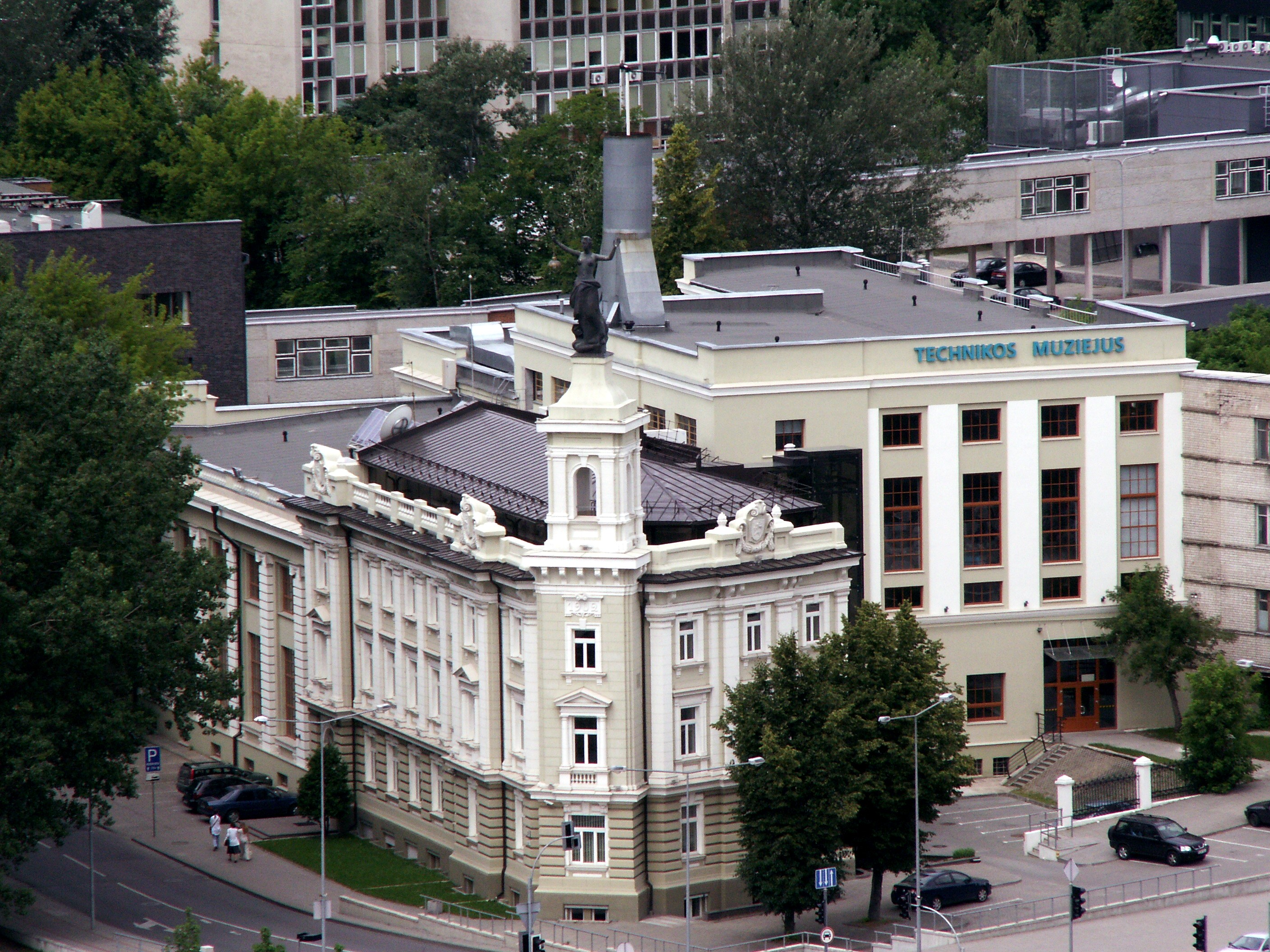
- As viewed from Gediminas' Tower
- Established: February 15, 2002
- Location: Rinktinės g. 2, 09312 Vilnius
- Coordinates: 54.690354°N 25.287515°E
- Type: Science museum, local museum
- Visitors: 48,248 (2018)
- Director: Mykolas Bistrickas
- Owners: Vilnius city municipality National Lithuanian Electricity Association; Lithuanian Electricity Association; JSC "Vilniaus šilumos tinklai" Lithuanian District Heating Association
- Parking: City parking, Red zone
- Website: etm.lt

Energy and Technology Museum (Lithuanian: Energetikos ir technikos muziejus) is an institution dedicated to researching and presenting energy history, the industrial heritage of Lithuania, and the history of Vilnius. It is housed in a former Vilnius power plant. At 5,000 square meters, this museum is the largest museum of technology in Lithuania.

The museum also features interactive rooms that are mainly aimed at children and feature interactive exhibits which illustrate different aspects of science.

The first public power plant of Vilnius was opened in 1903. The Energy and Technology Museum still holds the old power plant equipment including steam turbines, generators, steam boilers, water pumps, pipelines and a control panel.

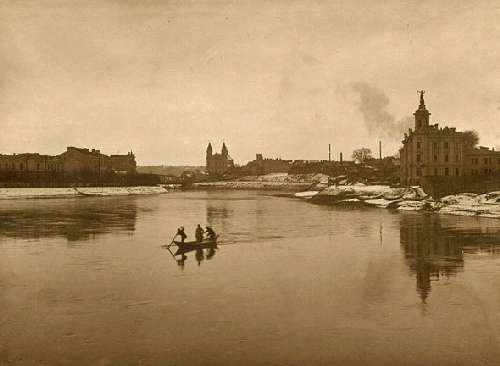
Vilnius Power Plant in 1918 (right).
