= Grabučiškės =

- Village
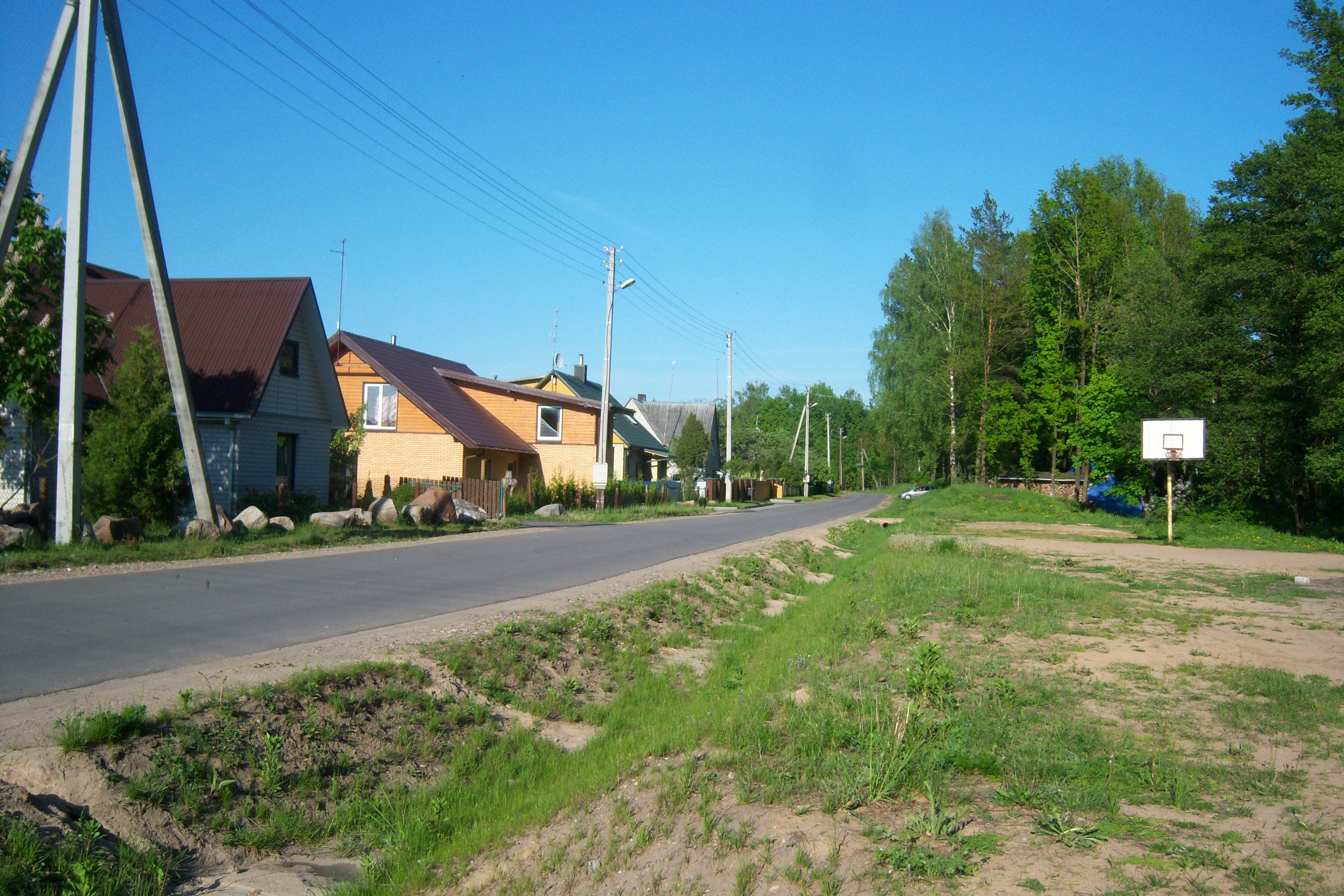
- The main street of Grabučiškės

- Location of Grabučiškės
- Coordinates: 54°53′49.2″N 24°9′10.8″E
- Country: Lithuania
- Ethnographic region: Aukštaitija
- County: Kaunas County
- Municipality: Kaišiadorys district municipality
- Eldership: Rumšiškės eldership

Population (2021)
  - Total: 134
- Time zone: UTC+2 (EET)
  - Summer (DST): UTC+3 (EEST)

Grabučiškės is a village in the Kaišiadorys District Municipality, Lithuania, located in the Kauno Marios Regional Park, 5 kilometers northwest of Rumšiškės, by the Jokūbiniai stream. Located near the highway, by the shore of Kaunas Reservoir, there is a rest area. A wooden cross was built at the entrance to the village. The village is surrounded by the Rumšiškės Forest.

== History ==
Most of the inhabitants of Gastilonys moved to Grabučiškės in around 1960, when the Kaunas Reservoir was dammed.

== Gallery ==
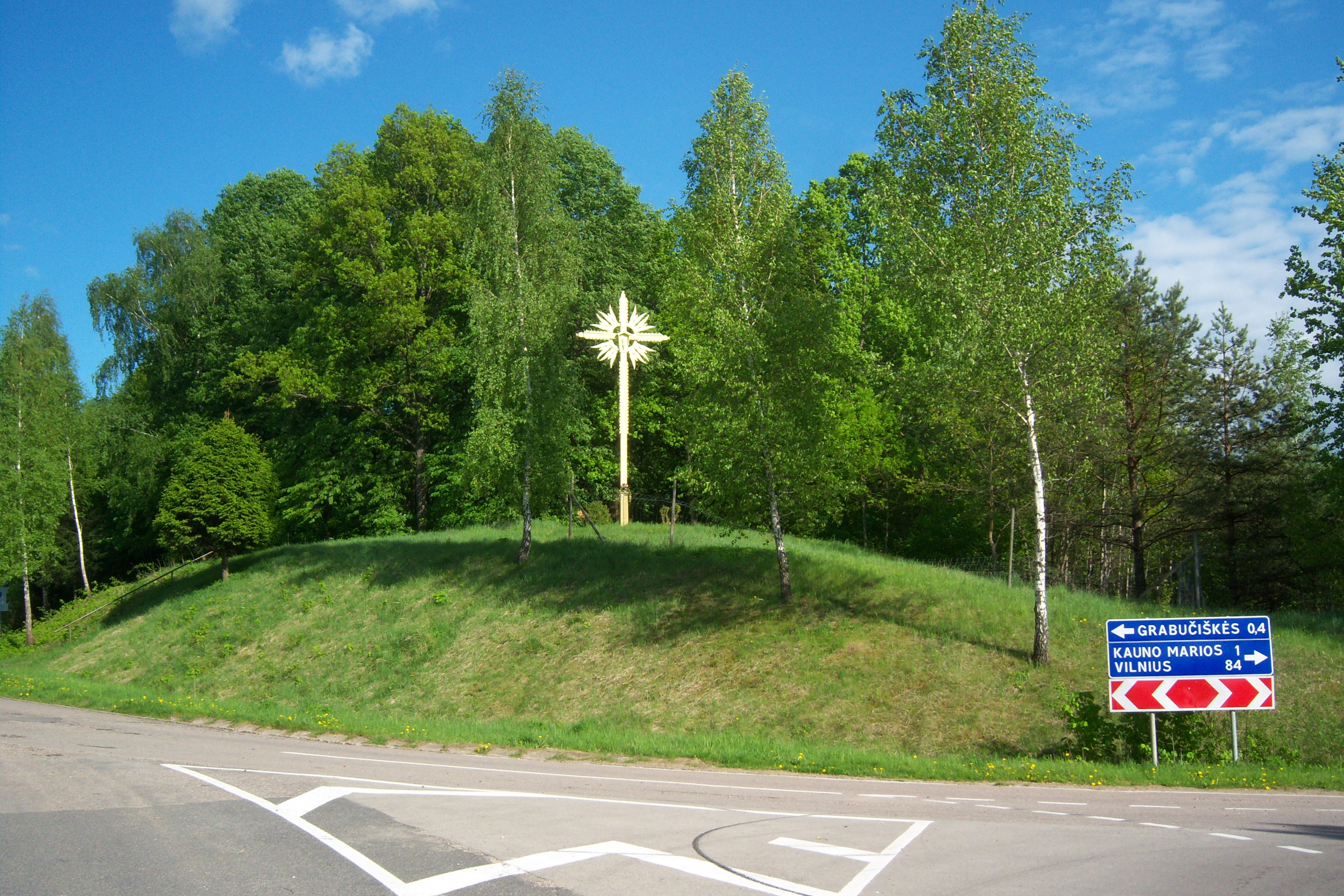
The cross of Grabučiškės

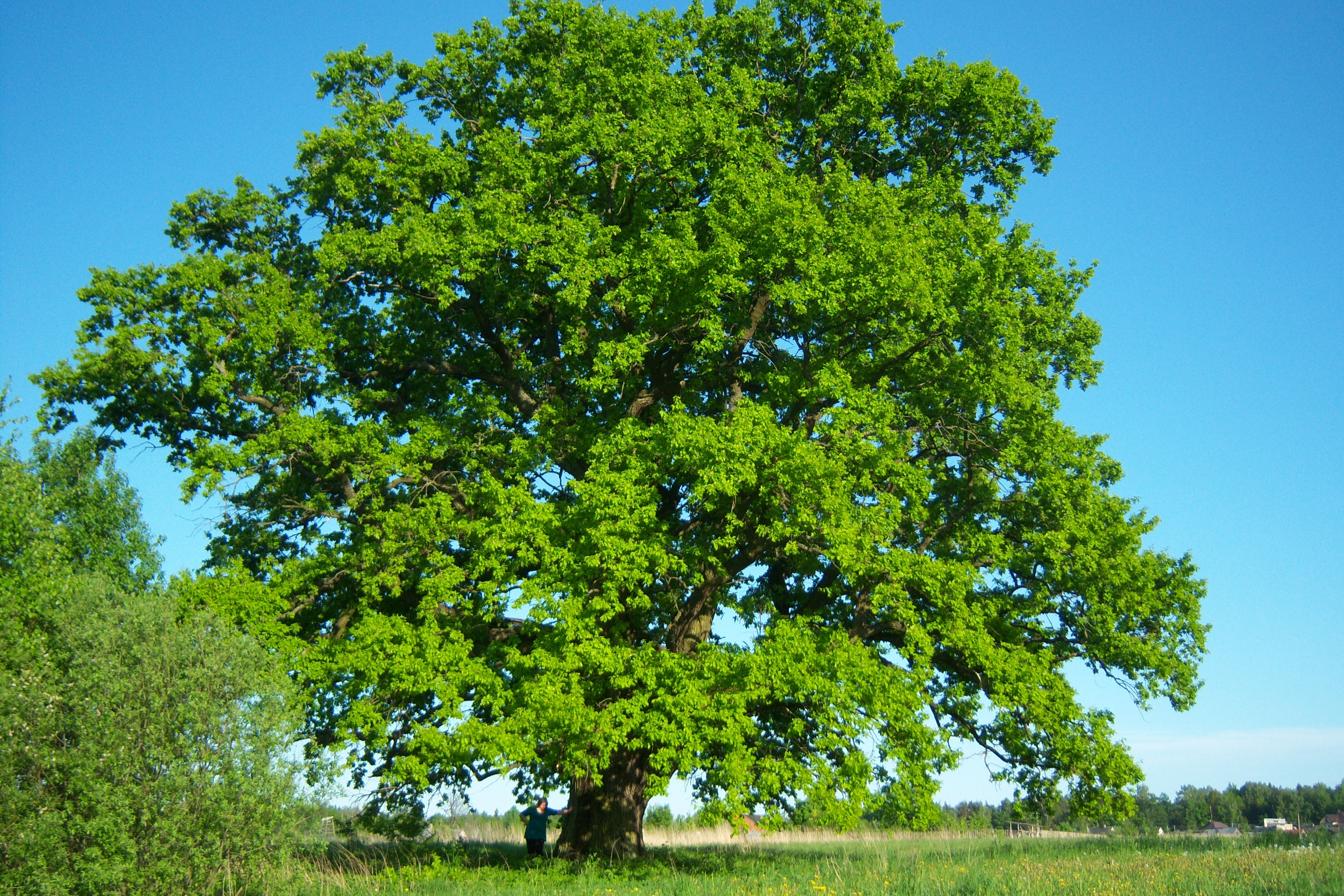
Oak tree in the fields of Grabučiškės
