= LEO LT =

Lithuanian national energy company

LEO LT AB
- Company type: Private
- Industry: electricity
- Founded: 2007
- Founder: Republic of Lithuania, NDX Energija
- Defunct: 2009
- Fate: dissolved
- Headquarters: Vilnius, Lithuania
- Subsidiaries: Lietuvos Energija, RST (Rytų skirstomieji tinklai – Eastern Power Grid Company), VST (Vakarų skirstomieji tinklai – Western Power Grid Company)

LEO LT AB or Lithuanian Electricity Organization (Lithuanian: Lietuvos elektros organizacija) was a national energy holding company in Lithuania. The company owned shares of Lithuania's three major electric power production and distribution companies. It was established in early 2008 to raise funds for the construction of the planned Visaginas Nuclear Power Plant after close down of Ignalina Plant, and Lithuania–Sweden and Lithuania–Poland power connections. The decision to liquidate the company, mired in controversies and attacked by critics, was reached by the shareholder of LEO LT on 4 September 2009.

== Formation ==
On 28 June 2007, Lithuania's parliament adopted a law on building a new nuclear power plant. The law also stipulated creation of a "national investor" to gain investments for the new nuclear power plant. The talks between the government, under Prime Minister Gediminas Kirkilas, and privately owned NDX Energija, part of VP Market group, on the establishment of this "national investor" started on 30 November 2007. An agreement was reached on 20 December 2007, the Seimas (Lithuanian Parliament) approved it on 1 February 2008, and President Valdas Adamkus signed the law on 12 February 2008. LEO LT started its official operations on 20 May 2008 with capital of 5 billion litas (approx. US$2.3 billion).

According to the initial agreement, the shares of LEO LT were owned by the Republic of Lithuania (61.7%) and by private NDX Energija (38.3%). A small number of the shares (0.3–0.4%) were to be traded on the Vilnius Stock Exchange. The Lithuanian government transferred to LEO LT its holdings in Lietuvos Energija (96.4%) and RST (Rytų skirstomieji tinklai – Eastern Power Grid Company, 71.34%), while NDX Energija transferred 97.1% of shares in VST (Vakarų skirstomieji tinklai – Western Power Grid Company). The government planned to offer to buy a 20.3% stake in RST owned by E.ON. The Kruonis Pumped Storage Plant and Kaunas Hydroelectric Plant were excluded from LEO LT and remained at the disposal of the state.

== Dissolution ==
The formation of LEO LT was controversial and attracted much criticism. The main complains included that the new company would again monopolize the market which was divided only in 2002, that NDX Energija was selected as a partner without a public competition, and that the deal possibly violated the Constitution of Lithuania and regulations of the European Union on monopoly in energy. In its decision of 2 March 2009, the Constitutional Court of Lithuania ruled that while there were minor violations in the deal between the government and NDX Energija they were not substantial to merit voiding the agreement. The company was followed by continuous allegations of corruption. One commentator labeled the debacle as the "fraud of the century".

Parliamentary elections at the end of 2008, brought a new government, under Prime Minister Andrius Kubilius, that did not support LEO LT. On 4 September 2009, the Seimas voted to liquidate LEO LT. The agreement with NDX Energija on division of assets was signed on 4 December 2009. The government would retain shares in all three companies (Lietuvos energija, RST and VST) and pay a compensation of 680 million litas to NDX – about the same amount NDX paid for its share of VST in 2003 and 2004. Thus the deal is interpreted as favorable to the government. According to reports in the media, NDX made about 500 million litas from its investment in VST. However, analysts also point out lost opportunity costs: VST was valued at 2–3 billion litas in 2007.
