= Vilnius Biofuel Power Plant =

- 2022
- Official name: Vilniaus kogeneracinė jėgainė
- Country: Lithuania
- Location: Vilnius
- Coordinates: 54°40′4″N 25°9′24″E
- Status: Operational
- Construction began: 2016
- Commission date: 2021
- Construction cost: 340 million €
- Owner: Ignitis grupė

Thermal power station
- Primary fuel: Waste
- Secondary fuel: Biofuel

Power generation
- Nameplate capacity: 88 MW (electricity); 227 MW (heat)

Vilnius Biofuel Power Plant is a waste-to-energy plant in Vilnius, Lithuania. The plant produces 40% of all annual heating requirements for the city of Vilnius.

It was built next to the decommissioned Vilnius Combined Heat and Power Plant and utilises some of its infrastructure.
