= Pažaislis =

Part of Kaunas

Coordinates: 54°53′N 24°01′E

Pažaislis is a neighborhood ("territory") of Kaunas, Lithuania, within its Petrašiūnai eldership. It includes the Pažaislis Monastery.

== History ==
Originally, there were two places named Pažaislis in the same area. One of them was a folwark owned by Krzysztof Zygmunt Pac. By the end of the 19th century it had 6 households with some 50–60 persons. Another was a manor across Neman. Originally it was owned by the Oborski family and Pac bought it from a Samuel Jan Oborski in 1664. Initially, a wooden hermitage of Camaldolese was built there by Krzysztof Pac in 1664, on the hill called Mons Pacis in Latin (a hint to the Pac family; Literal trans'ation: "Peace Mountain"; Lithuanian: Taikos kalnas, but it may also be read "Pac's Mountain"). Eventually it grew into the monastery. The same year Pac transferred the ownership of the whole Pożajście to Camaldolese and henceforth the place was known as Mons Pacis. In 1667 Pac further transfers to Camaldolese several other manors ( Duszmiany, Jackówek, etc.).

With the construction of the monastery the settlement grew and eventually became the seat of the Pažaislis volost. Pažaislis was incorporated into Kaunas in 1946.

A significant part of the neighborhood is occupied by the park named Pažaislis heath. It is part of the Kauno Marios Regional Park.

By the monastery, within the heath of Pažaislis, grows the Peace Mountain Oak, a natural heritage object. It "succeeded" the original Pažaislis Oak, which was dying and removed from the list of natural monuments.

During the construction of the Kaunas Reservoir nearly all its territory northeast of the monastery was flooded. During the flooding the Peace Mountain naturally formed a peninsula, on which the monastery resides now.

== Gallery ==
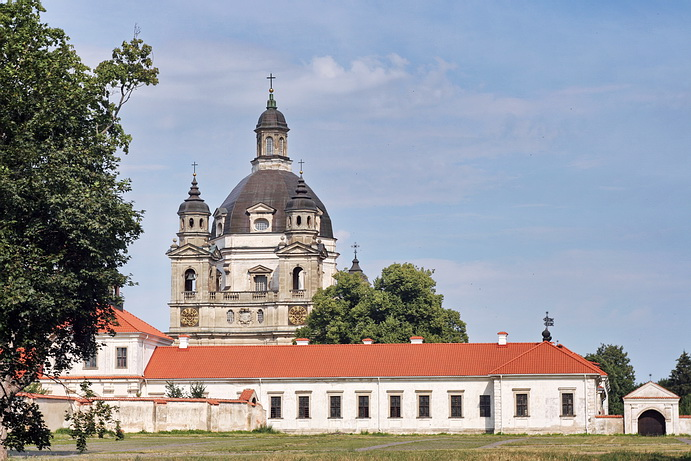
Pažaislis Monastery

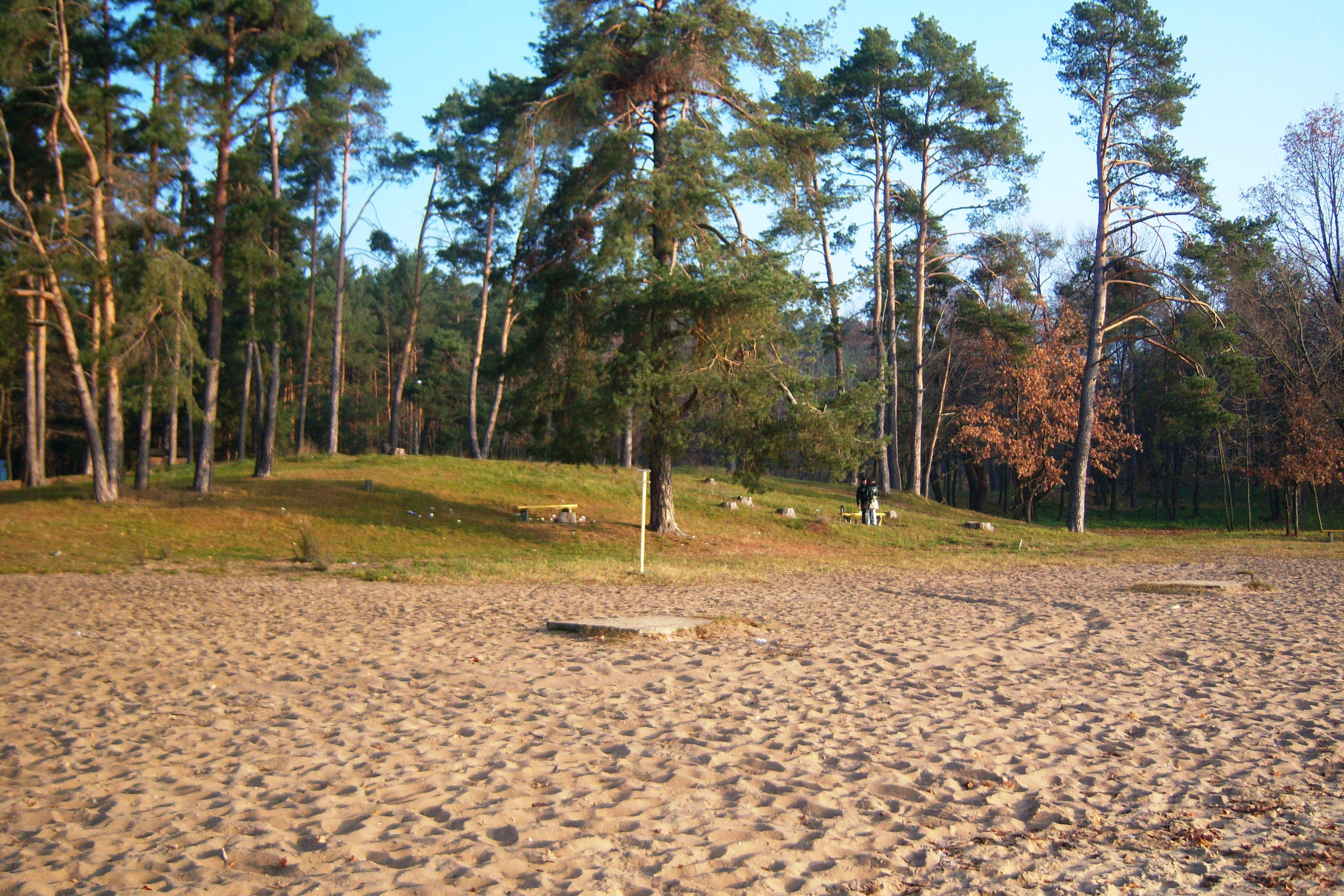
Pažaislis heath

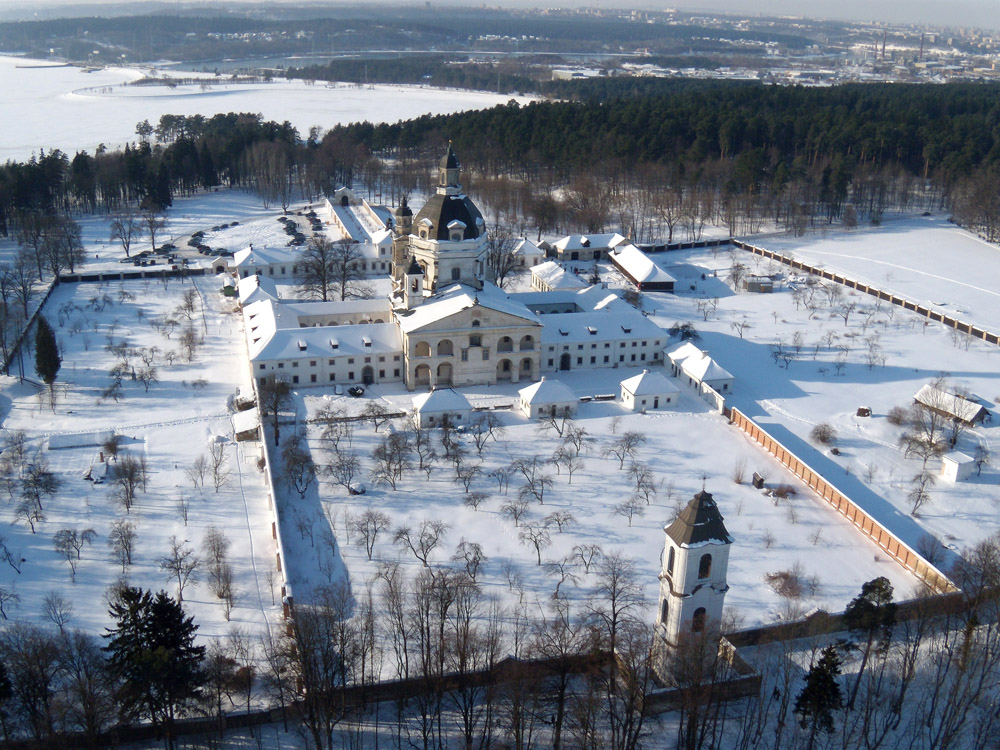
Monastery and heath aerial view

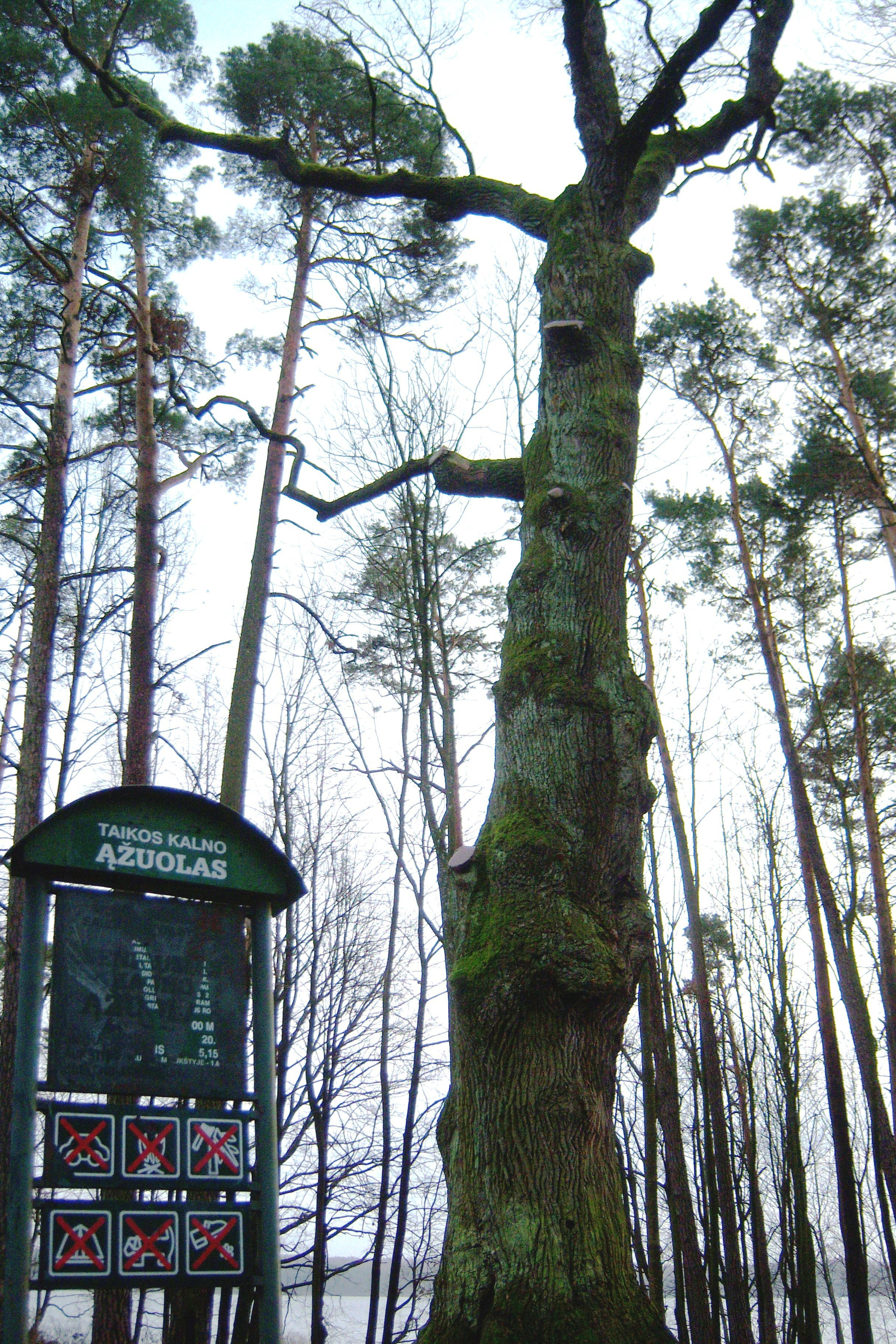
Peace Mountain Oak

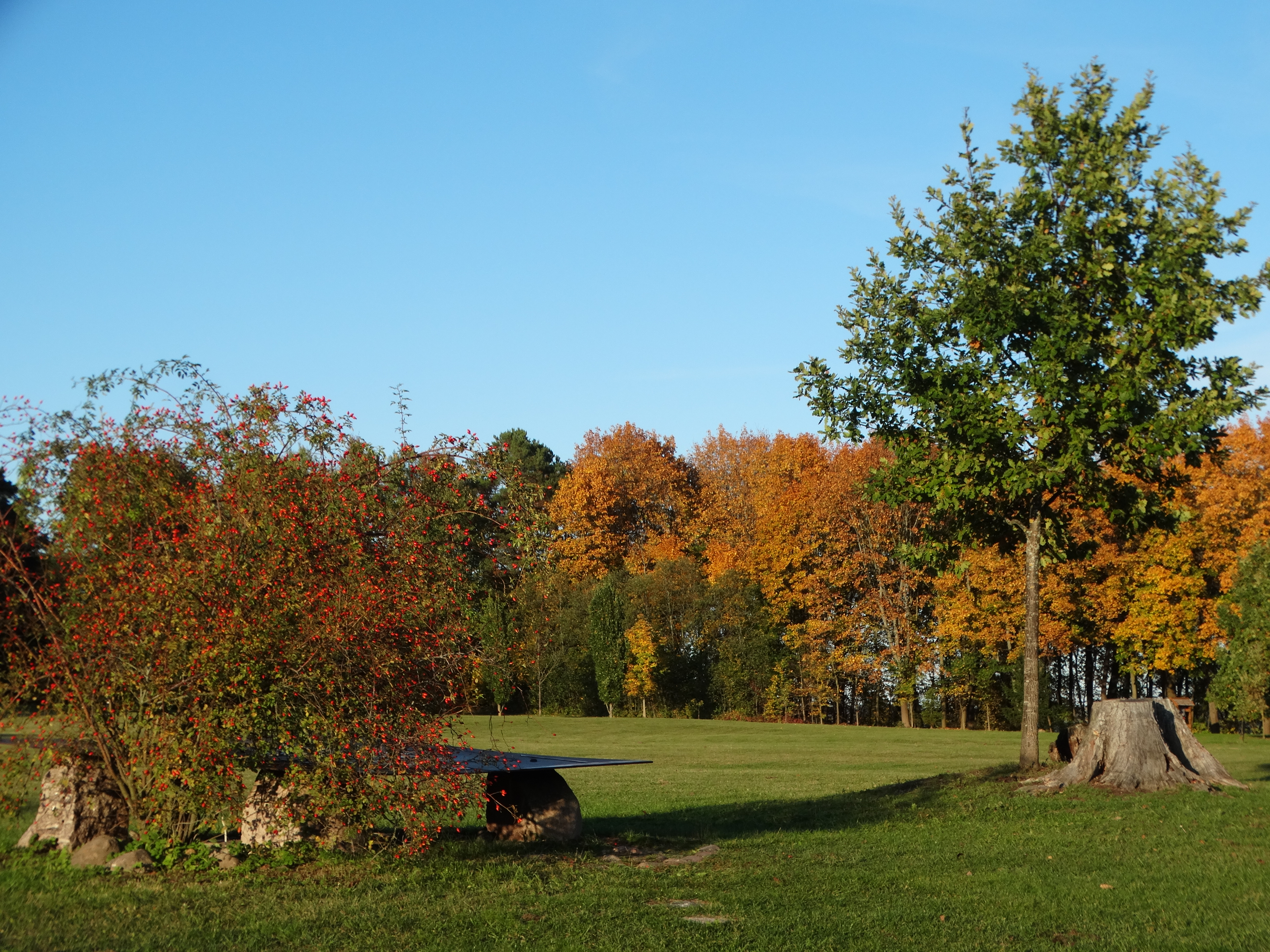
Remnants of Pažaislis Oak

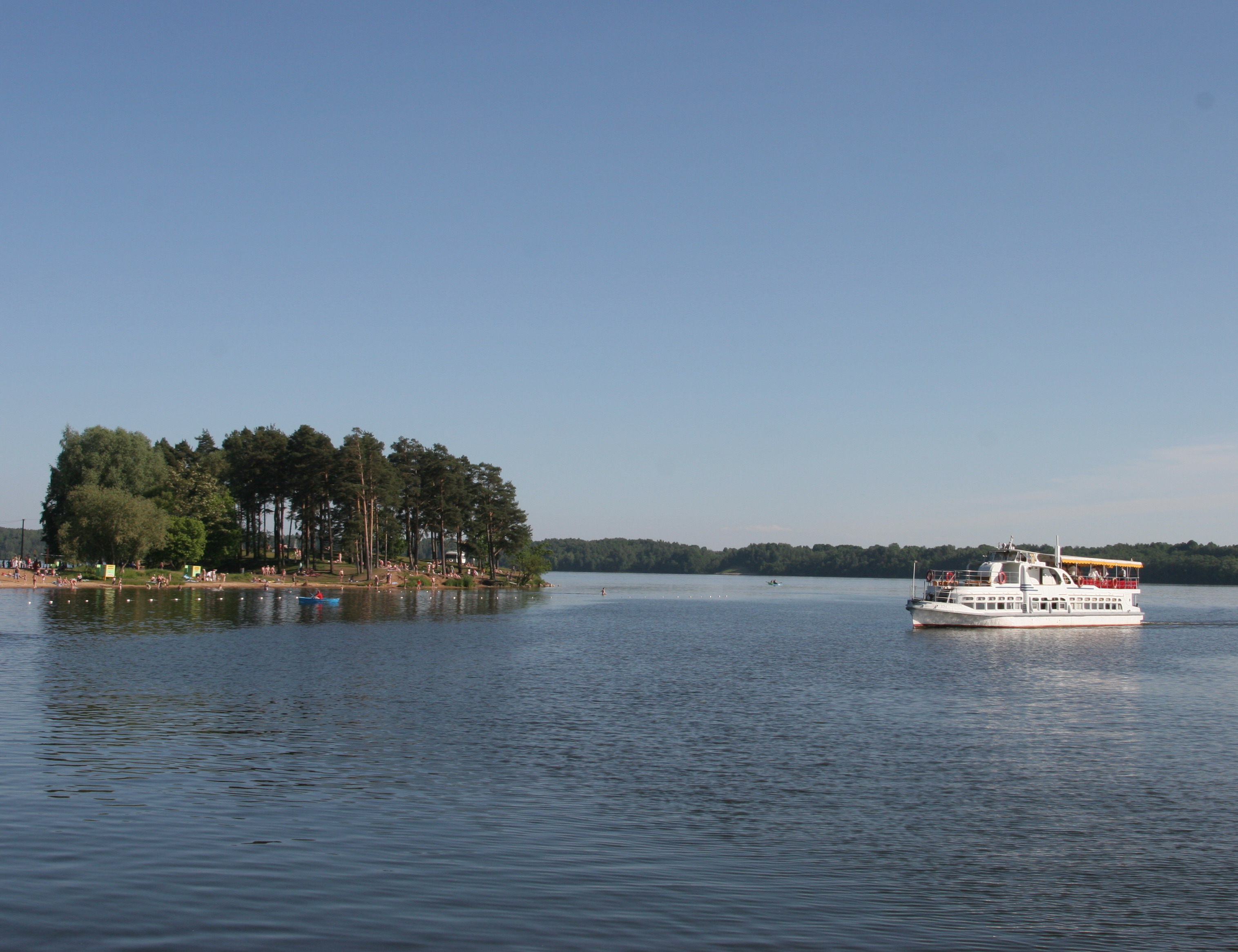
Pažaislis Yacht Club

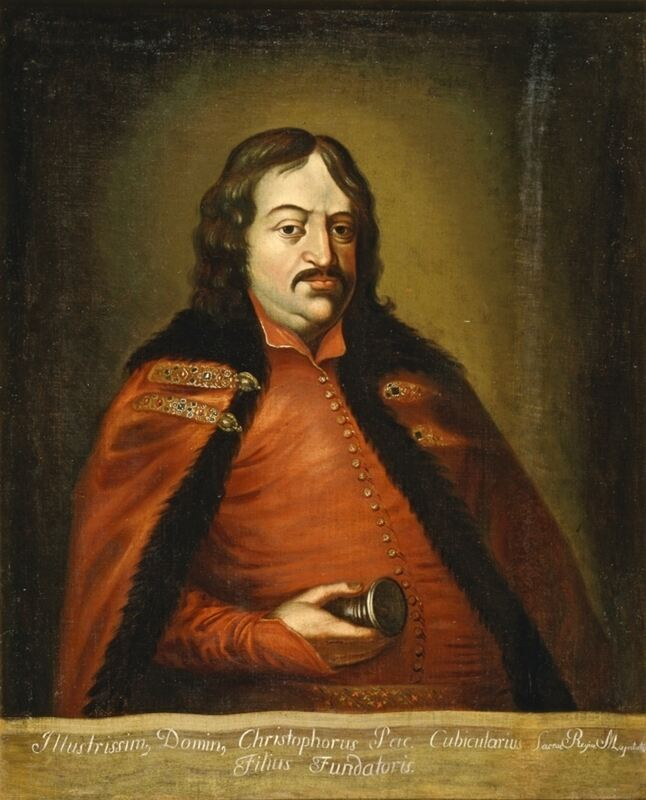
Krzysztof Zygmunt Pac
