= Gastilonys =

- Village
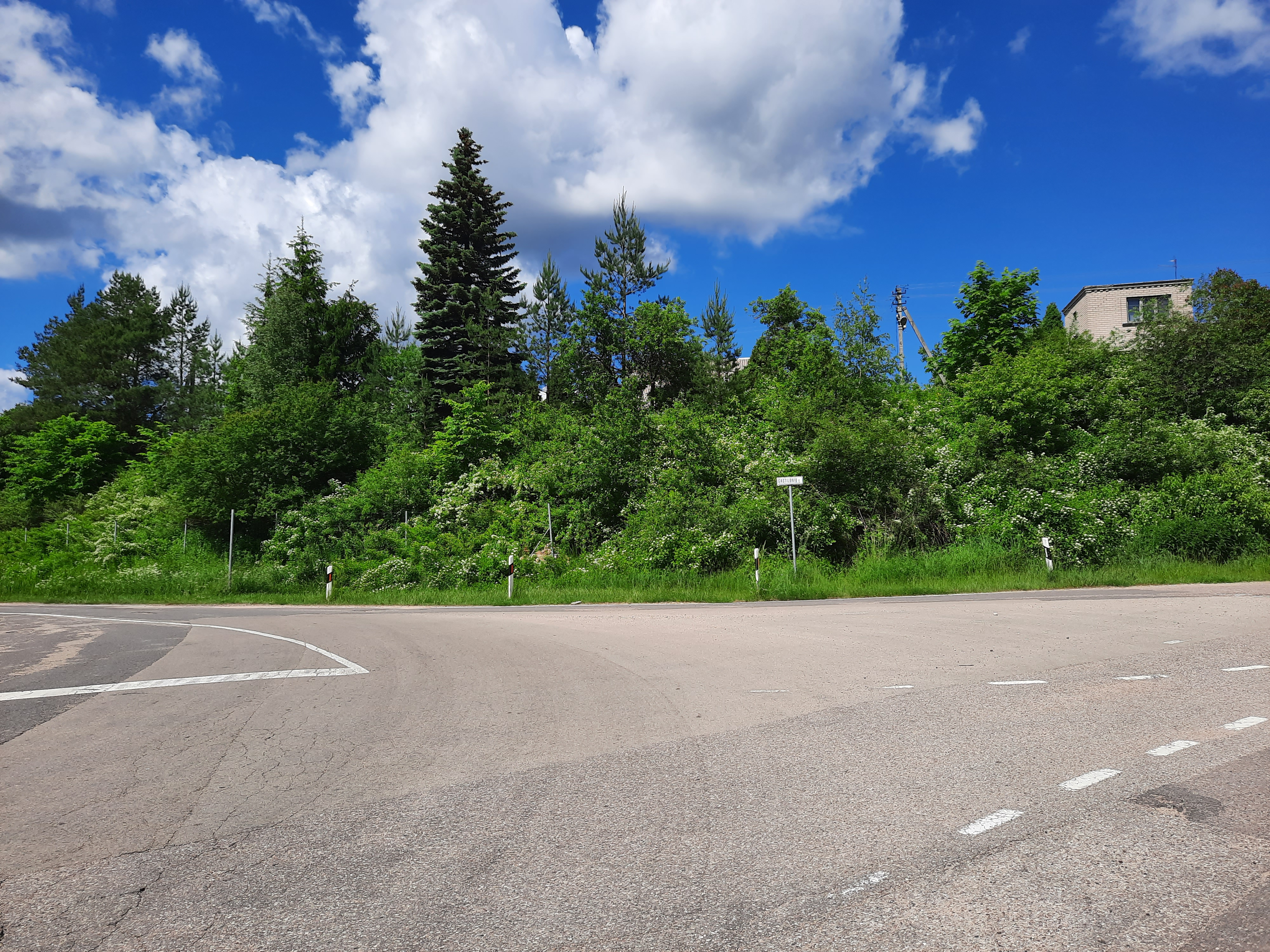
- Road leading to Grabučiškės

- Location of Gastilonys
- Coordinates: 54°52′40.8″N 24°8′38.4″E
- Country: Lithuania
- Ethnographic region: Aukštaitija
- County: Kaunas County
- Municipality: Kaišiadorys district municipality
- Eldership: Rumšiškės eldership

Population (1923)
  - Total: 228
- Time zone: UTC+2 (EET)
  - Summer (DST): UTC+3 (EEST)

Gastilonys is a former village in the Kaišiadorys District Municipality, Lithuania, located 1 kilometer south of Grabučiškės, on the right bank of the Kaunas Reservoir.

The Gastilonys Botanical-Zoological Reserve has been established in the village, where Gastilonys oak grows.

== History ==
The village used to be on the right bank of the Neman, east of Mozūrai. In 1959, Kaunas was flooded during the construction of the Kaunas Hydroelectric Power Plant, creating the Kaunas Reservoir.

=== Origin of the name ===
The name of the village comes from the surname Gastila.
