= Lietuvos Dujos =

- Industry: Oil and gas
- Founded: 1961
- Defunct: January 1, 2016
- Fate: Merged into Energijos Skirstymo Operatorius
- Successor: Energijos Skirstymo Operatorius
- Headquarters: Vilnius, Lithuania
- Products: Natural gas
- Parent: Lietuvos Energija

AB Lietuvos Dujos was a natural gas company in Lithuania. It was established in 1961 as an integrated gas company for import, transmission, distribution and sale of natural gas. After privatization in the 1990s, its major shareholders became Gazprom and E.ON Ruhrgas.

In 2002, the privatization process of Lietuvos Dujos started. June 2002 German Ruhrgas AG and E.ON Energie AG consortium acquired 34% of the shares of Lietuvos Dujos (the value of the transaction is EUR 116 million). Lt). March 2004 another 34% of the shares were acquired by the Russian company OAO Gazprom (the transaction is valued at EUR 100 million). Lt.) and a long-term gas supply contract (until 2015) was signed with it. In 2004, 128.2 million shareholders. Litas increased the authorized capital of the company. The company's shares were listed on the Nasdaq Vilnius stock exchange.

In 2009, the company operated around 1,800 km of trunk pipelines and 7,900 km of distribution pipelines, and employed around 1,820 people. In 2013, its transmission business was spun-off into a separate company Amber Grid. In 2014, Gazprom and E.ON sold their stakes to the state-owned energy company Lietuvos Energija. On 1 January 2016, Lietuvos Dujos was merged into Energijos Skirstymo Operatorius.
