= National Lithuanian Electricity Association =

- Nacionalinė Lietuvos elektros asociacija
- Formation: 6 June 2011; 15 years ago
- Type: trade organization
- Purpose: Electricity
- Headquarters: Vilnius, Lithuania
- Members: 4 members
- Official language: Lithuanian
- Website: www.nlea.lt

National Lithuanian Electricity Association was established on 6 June 2011.

NLEA represents Lithuania in Eurelectric.

== Members ==
1. LESTO
2. Lietuvos energija
3. Litgrid
4. Technologijų ir inovacijų centras

== See also ==
- Lithuanian Electricity Association
