= Visaginas Nuclear Power Plant =

Proposed nuclear power plant in Lithuania

Visaginas nuclear power plant
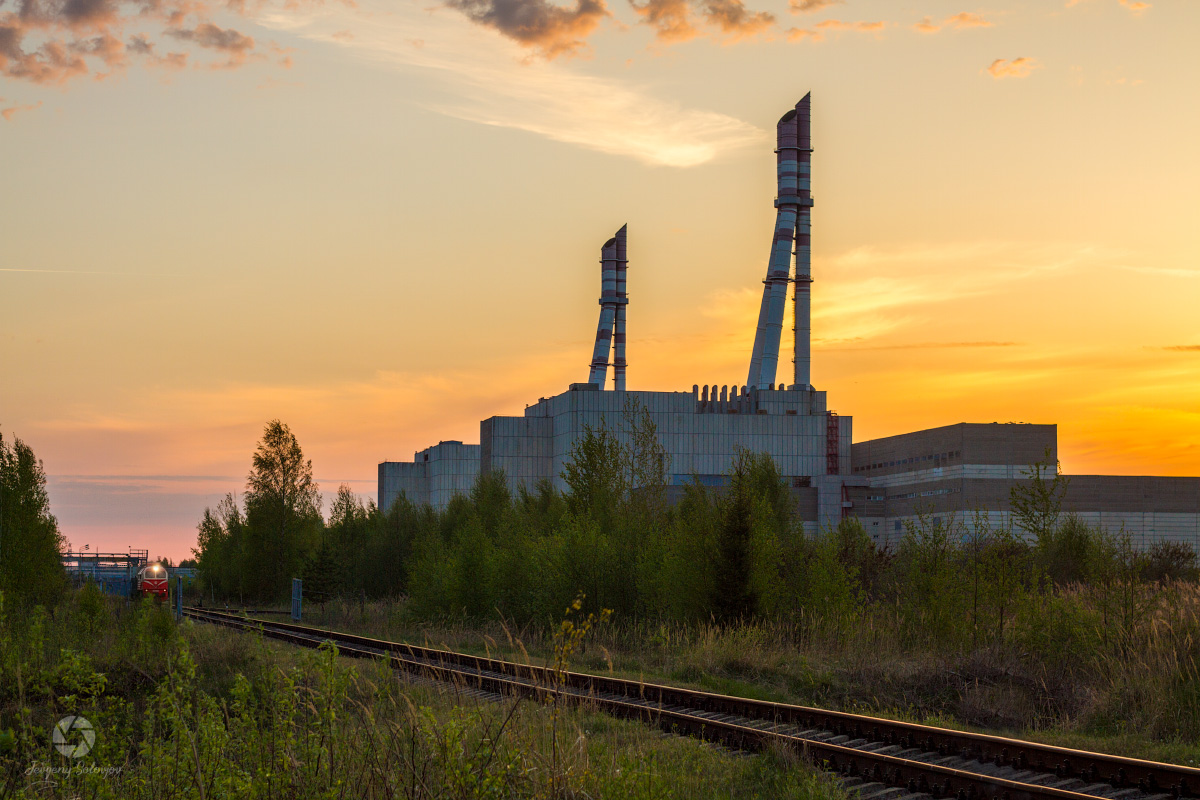
- Official name: Visagino atominė elektrinė
- Country: Lithuania
- Location: Visaginas Municipality
- Coordinates: 55°36′20.52″N 26°34′33.03″E
- Status: Cancelled
- Construction cost: €5 billion

Power generation
- Nameplate capacity: 3,400 MW

External links
- Website: www.vae.lt/en/

Visaginas Nuclear Power Plant was a planned nuclear power plant project in Lithuania. It was proposed to be built at the site of the closed Ignalina Nuclear Power Plant, which was shut down on 31 December 2009 in accordance with Lithuania's accession agreement to the European Union. The two reactors of the Ignalina plant are currently undergoing a decommissioning process.

After a 2012 referendum found that 62.7% of the electorate was against the project, Belarus started construction of the Belarusian nuclear power plant, which will lie geographically very close to Visaginas. According to the instigator of the Visaginas proposal, former energy minister Arvydas Sekmokas, the Visaginas Nuclear Power Plant proposal is "dead".

== History ==
Discussions concerning the building of a new nuclear power plant started in the 1990s and continued in the 2000s. By the accession agreement to the EU, Lithuania took on an obligation to decommission the reactors of the Ignalina Nuclear Power Plant.

On 1 December 2005, during his visit to Estonia, Lithuanian Prime Minister Algirdas Brazauskas met with the CEO of Eesti Energia, Sandor Liive, to discuss Eesti Energia's participation in the nuclear power plant project. On 26 January 2006, in the conference in Vilnius, the representatives of all three Baltic states discussed the realization study for construction of a new power station in the region. On 27 February 2006, at the meeting in Trakai, the Prime Ministers of Lithuania, Latvia and Estonia signed a communiqué which invited state-owned energy companies in Lithuania, Latvia and Estonia to invest in the design and construction of a new nuclear power plant in Lithuania on the basis of agreed terms and conditions applicable to each party involved. On the basis of this communiqué, on 8 March 2006, during a meeting in Ignalina, the heads of Lietuvos Energija, Eesti Energia and Latvenergo signed a memorandum of understanding on the preparation for construction of a new nuclear reactor in Lithuania. On 8 December 2006, Poland was invited to join the project.

On 28 June 2007, Lithuania's parliament adopted a law on building a new nuclear power plant, the formal start of the project. On 4 July 2007, the President of Lithuania Valdas Adamkus signed the law and it became effective on 10 July 2007. The law also stipulated creation of a "national investor" to gain investments for the new nuclear power plant. The talks between the government and privately owned NDX Energija on the establishment of the "national investor" company started on 30 November 2007. The creation of the national investor—LEO LT—was agreed between the Government of Lithuania and NDX Energija on 20 December 2007. Lithuanian Parliament approved the agreement on 1 February 2008 and the Lithuanian President Valdas Adamkus signed the law on 12 February 2008. However, LEO LT was dissolved at the end of 2009 and the responsibilities for construction of the nuclear power plant took over the special project company Visagino atominė elektrinė. A tender for finding a strategic investor was launched in December 2009.

On 15 November 2007, the environmental impact assessment program was approved. On 30 July 2008, the planned new nuclear power plant was officially named Visaginas Nuclear Power Plant.

On 14 July 2011, Lithuania Ministry of Energy announced that it planned to sign a contract with GE Hitachi Nuclear Energy as strategic investor by the end 2011.

On 14 October 2012, an advisory referendum on constructing a new nuclear plant found 62.7% of the participating Lithuanian electorate against and 34.1% for.

On 30 July 2014, Lithuanian Energy Ministry and Hitachi signed a memorandum, declaring intentions to jointly perform preparatory work for setting up an interim project company.

In 2016, the instigator of the Visaginas proposal, former energy minister Arvydas Sekmokas, said the proposal was "dead".

== Technical description ==
Depending on the findings of the environmental impact assessment, the capacity of the power plant would have been up to 3,400 megawatts and it would likely have consisted of two reactors. Depending on the choice of reactor, the power plant would have been built by 2018–2020. The project was expected to cost between €3–5 billion.

== Project company ==
The project was developed by Visagino atominė elektrinė, a special project company. A majority of shares in the project company were owned by the strategic investor, GE Hitachi. In addition to the strategic investment, Lithuania retained a 34% interest in the project. Estonian, Latvian, and Polish companies participated in the project as regional partners.

== Environmental impact assessment ==
The environmental impact assessment was carried out by the consortium of Pöyry Energy Oy and Lithuanian Energy Institute. The EIA program was approved on 15 November 2007 and the EIA report was published on 27 August 2008. The whole EIA process was finished on 27 March 2009 and the report was approved by Ministry of Environment on 21 April 2009 by allowing construction of the plant up to 3,400 megawatts. The Environmental Impact Assessment approval was appealed by a coalition of NGOs (Community Atgaja from Lithuania, the Latvian Green Movement, CEE Bankwatch Network and Greenpeace).

== See also ==
- LitPol Link
