= Šiauliai–Jelgava power line =

Power transmission line

Location
- Country: Lithuania; Latvia
- General direction: north–south–north (bidirectional)
- From: Šiauliai
- Passes through: Mūša station
- To: Jelgava

Ownership information
- Partners: Litgrid; Augstsprieguma tikls

Construction information
- Commissioned: 26 March 1962

Technical information
- Type: overhead power line
- Current type: HVAC
- AC voltage: 330 kV
- No. of circuits: 1

The Šiauliai–Jelgava power line is an electricity link (interconnector) in the Baltic transmission system between Lithuania and Latvia.

The overhead power line is one of seven interconnections between the two countries and one of the four 330 kV power transmission lines between Lithuania and Latvia. Other links between Lithuania and Latvia include Panevėžys–Aizkraukle power line, Visaginas–Līksna power line and Klaipėda–Grobiņa power line.

== History ==
In 1956, the Lithuanian national electricity grid was established with a link between the Petrašiūnai Power Plant in Kaunas and the Rekyva Power Plant in Šiauliai. Šiauliai (Lithuania) and Jelgava (Latvia) were connected in 1962 creating the first ever transmission link between the two neighbouring countries. It was also the first ever 330 kV power line in Lithuania.

In 1997, a 93.2 kilometres (57.9 mi) long link with a voltage of 330 kV to the Lithuanian city Telšiai was added to the Šiauliai–Jelgava power line.

== See also ==
- List of high-voltage transmission links in Lithuania
