= Elektrėnai Reservoir =

Reservoir in Lithuania

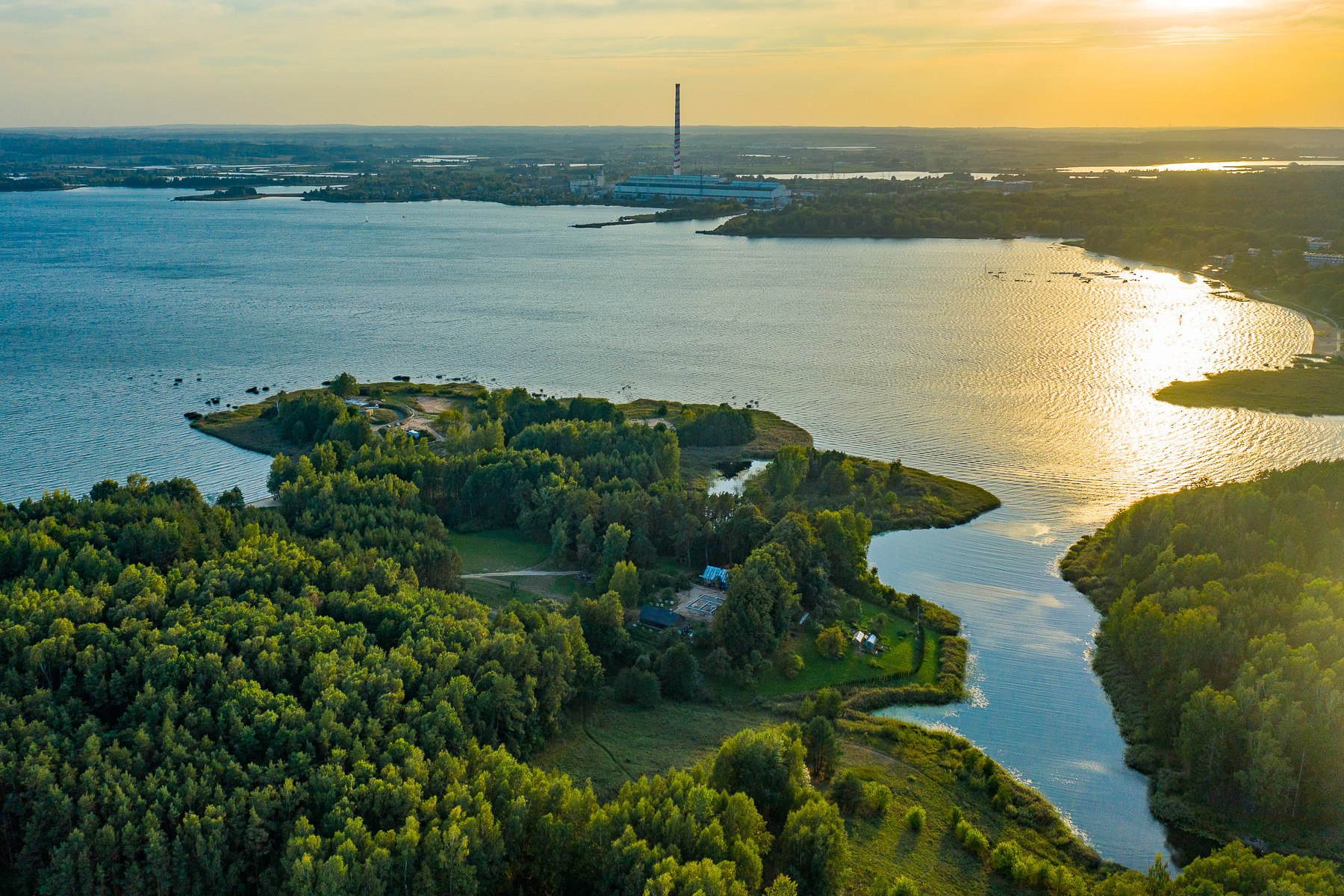
- Elektrėnai Reservoir with Elektrėnai power plant in the distance

- Location within Lithuania
- Coordinates: 54°45′20″N 24°40′29″E
- Type: Artificial lake / reservoir
- Primary inflows: Strėva River, and 9 other rivulets
- Primary outflows: Strėva River
- Basin countries: Lithuania
- Max. length: 11 km (6.8 mi)
- Max. width: 3.1 km (1.9 mi)
- Surface area: 1,264 ha (3,120 acres)
- Max. depth: 31 m (102 ft)
- Shore length^{1}: 34.1 km (21.2 mi)
- Islands: 18 islands cover 50.5 ha (125 acres)
- Settlements: Elektrėnai
- ^{1} Shore length is not a well-defined measure.

Elektrėnai Reservoir (Lithuanian: Elektrėnų marios), located south of the city of Elektrėnai, Lithuania, is the third-largest artificial lake in Lithuania. It was created in 1961 by damming the Strėva River. It supplies cooling water to the 1,800 MW Elektrėnai Power Plant. A number of villages drowned when the reservoir was created; over 140 households were relocated. The reservoir also covered eight other lakes.

The reservoir covers about 1,264 hectares, with depths of over 30 meters.

== Sources ==
- Elektrėnai, Vilnius: Jandrija, 2006
