= Vilnius Combined Heat and Power Plant =

Power plant in Vilnius, Lithuania

Vilnius CHP Plant
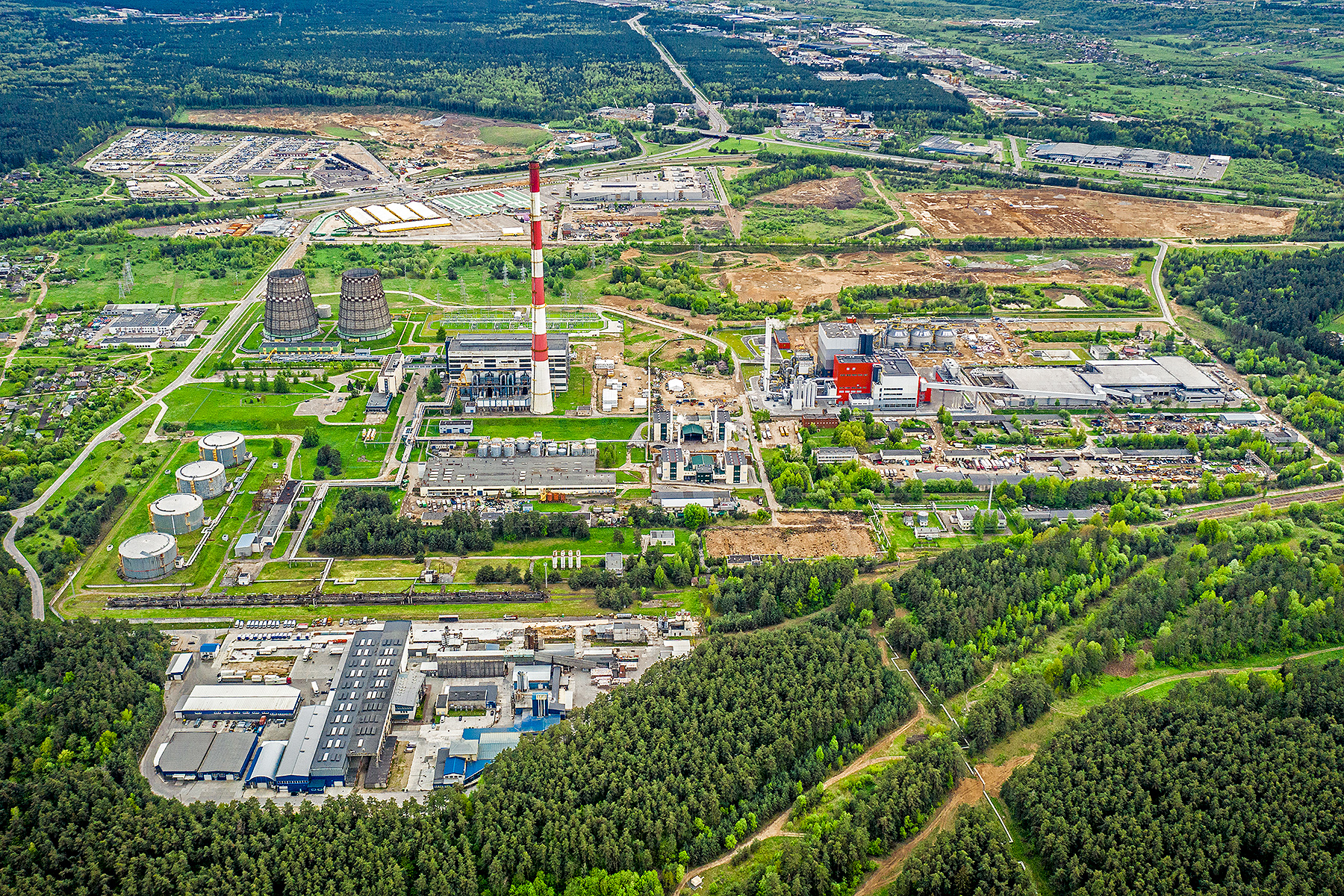
- Official name: Vilniaus termofikacinė elektrinė
- Country: Lithuania
- Location: Vilnius
- Coordinates: 54°40′4″N 25°9′25″E
- Status: Decommissioned
- Construction began: 1976
- Commission date: 1983
- Decommission date: 2016
- Owner: Ignitis Group

Thermal power station
- Primary fuel: Natural gas
- Secondary fuel: Mazut
- Cogeneration?: Yes

Power generation
- Units operational: 2 × 180 MW
- Nameplate capacity: 360 MW

External links
- Website: https://ignitisgamyba.lt/
- Commons: Related media on Commons

Vilnius Combined Heat and Power Plant or Vilnius Power Plant-3 was a power plant in Vilnius, Lithuania.

Vilnius Combined Heat and Power Plant has a capacity of 603 MW heating power and 360 MW electric power. It was considered the most polluting electric power plant in Lithuania. As a consequence, Vilnius Combined Heat and Power Plant was closed in 2016. In 2016 a new waste-to-energy Vilnius Biofuel Power Plant was built next to the CHP plant.

In July 2024, equipment from Vilnius Power Plant-3 was transferred to Ukraine to aid rebuilding energy infrastructure in war-torn regions.

== See also ==
- List of power stations in Lithuania
