= Energijos skirstymo operatorius =

Electricity and gas distribution company

Energijos Skirstymo Operatorius AB (ESO)
- Company type: Private
- Traded as: Nasdaq Baltic: ESO1L
- ISIN: LT0000130023
- Industry: Electricity; Natural gas
- Predecessors: LESTO AB; Lietuvos dujos
- Founded: 1 January 2016
- Headquarters: Vilnius, Lithuania
- Services: Electricity and gas distribution
- Revenue: 604,000,000 euro (2018)
- Net income: 15,700,000 euro (2018)
- Number of employees: 2,454 (2018)
- Parent: Ignitis
- Website: www.eso.lt

Energijos Skirstymo Operatorius AB (ESO) is an electricity and gas distribution company in Lithuania. It was established on 1 January 2016 through merger of the Lithuanian electricity distribution network operator LESTO AB and a gas company Lietuvos dujos. ESO is controlled by a state-owned group of energy companies Ignitis Group which owns 94.98% of shares. Its shares are traded on NASDAQ OMX Vilnius.

ESO is a member of National Lithuanian Electricity Association.
