= Strėva =

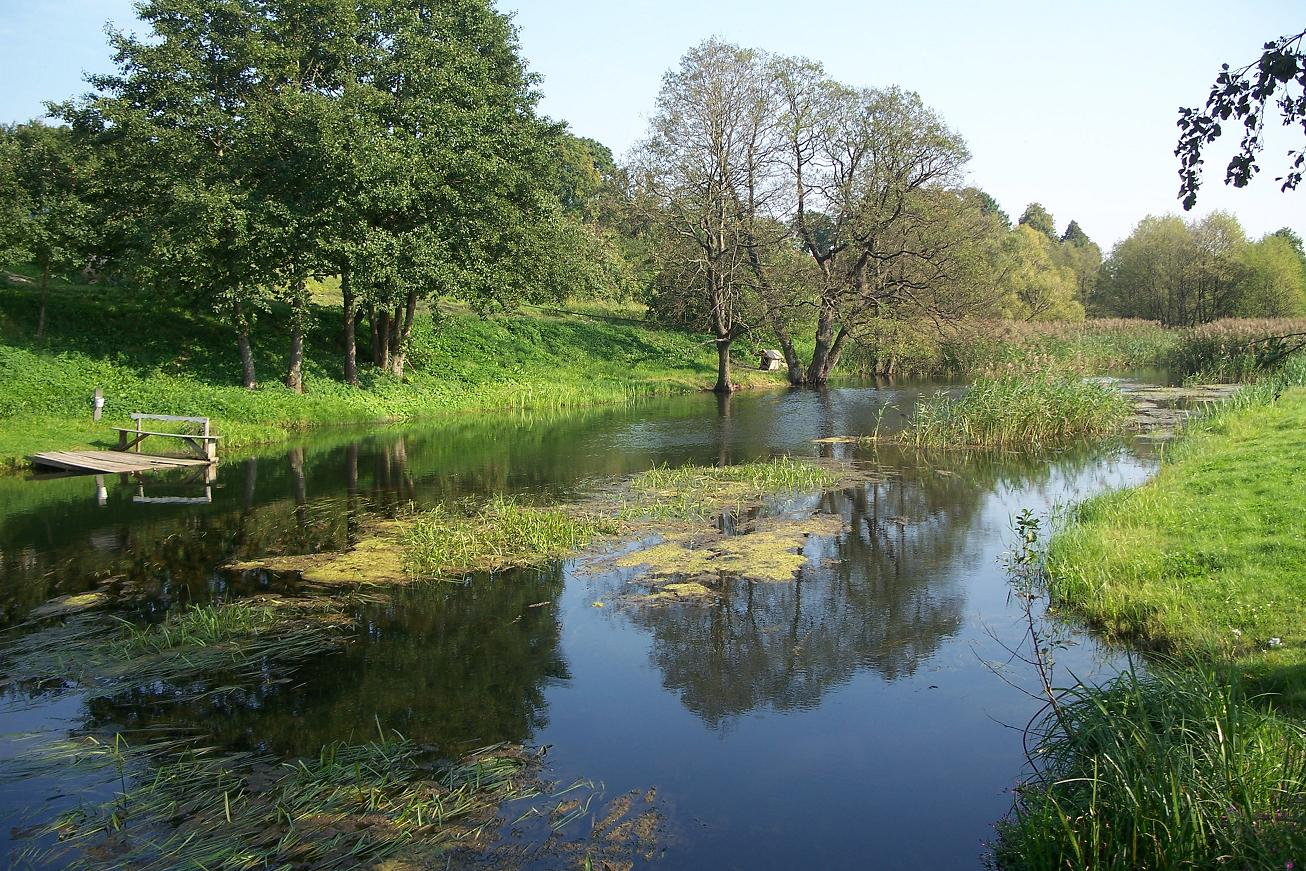
- The Strėva near Semeliškės

Location
- Country: Lithuania

Physical characteristics
- Source
  - location: 5 km (3.1 mi) east of Aukštadvaris, Trakai district municipality
- Mouth: Kaunas Reservoir
  - coordinates: 54.801909°N 24.244355°E
- Length: 73.6 km (45.7 mi)
- Basin size: 759 km^{2} (293 sq mi)
- Discharge
  - average: 7.5 m^{3}/s (260 cu ft/s)

Basin features
- Progression: Kaunas Reservoir→ Neman→ Baltic Sea

The Strėva (German: Strebe) is a river in Trakai and Kaunas district municipalities, Lithuania. In 1348, the Battle of Strėva between the Grand Duchy of Lithuania and the Teutonic Knights was fought on the frozen river. In 1962, the river was impounded to create the Elektrėnai Reservoir, the third-largest artificial lake in Lithuania. The Strėva flows through Elektrėnai, Žiežmariai, Semeliškės. A 2001 study found the Strėva to be one of the cleanest rivers in the Neman basin in Lithuania.

Variant forms of spelling for Strėva or in other languages: Reka Strava, Strava, Streva, Strėva.
