= Lithuanian Electricity Association =

National trade organization

- Lietuvos elektros energetikos asociacija
- Formation: 5 June 1998; 28 years ago
- Type: trade organization
- Purpose: Electricity
- Headquarters: Vilnius, Lithuania
- Members: 45 members
- Official language: Lithuanian
- Website: www.leea.lt

The Lithuanian Electricity Association was established on 5 June 1998, consisting of 45 electricity production, transmission, distribution and energy supply companies, construction organizations and other associated power structures as well as individual economic operators involved in energy production, supply and power facility designing activities.

In 2001, LEA was one of the members who founded the Lithuanian Committee for World Energy Council, representing Lithuania in the World Energy Council.

== See also ==
- National Lithuanian Electricity Association
