= Lithuanian District Heating Association =

- Lietuvos šilumos tiekėjų asociacija
- Formation: 24 February 1998; 28 years ago
- Type: public organization
- Purpose: District heating
- Headquarters: Vilnius, Lithuania
- Members: 42 members
- Official language: Lithuanian
- Website: www.lsta.lt

Lithuanian District Heating Association (Lithuanian: Lietuvos šilumos tiekėjų asociacija) is an organization that represents Lithuanian district heat utilities, organizations and others associated energy structures in the district heating sector in Lithuania.

LDHA was established on 24 February 1998. Members of association produce and supply around 95-99 % of the total heat through the district heating network in Lithuania.

LDHA has 42 members, 31 of the total membership comprise district heating companies and 11 companies whose activities are closely linked to the heat sector.
