= Kaunas Reservoir =

- Location within Lithuania

- Schematic map of Kaunas Reservoir region
- Coordinates: 54°51′10″N 24°10′02″E
- Type: reservoir
- Primary inflows: Nemunas River
- Primary outflows: Nemunas River
- Basin countries: Lithuania
- Max. width: 3.3 km (2.1 mi)
- Surface area: 63.5 km^{2} (24.5 sq mi)
- Max. depth: 22 m (72 ft)
- Settlements: Kaunas, Rumšiškės

Kaunas Reservoir (Lithuanian: Kauno marios, Kaunas Lagoon, Kaunas Sea) is the largest Lithuanian artificial lake, created in 1959 by damming the Nemunas River near Kaunas and Rumšiškės. It occupies 63.5 square kilometers, which is about 0.1% of the total territory of Lithuania. The reservoir supports the operations of the Kaunas Hydroelectric Power Plant. Its waters cover the Nemunas valley from the river's confluence with Strėva River to the dam, a distance of about 25 kilometers. At its widest, the reservoir is 3.3 kilometers across and its greatest depth is 22 meters.

When the Nemunas was dammed in 1959-1960, the river water rose by 20 metres in 9 months, and at that time there were 35 villages and 700 homes in the flooded area of the lagoon, whose inhabitants were forcibly evicted by the Soviet government.

The reservoir also supports the operations of 900MW Kruonis Pumped Storage Plant, which is situated near confluence with Strėva River.

In 1992, in order to protect the local environment and cultural heritage, Kaunas Reservoir Regional Park was established. A yacht club operates in the park.

== Gallery ==
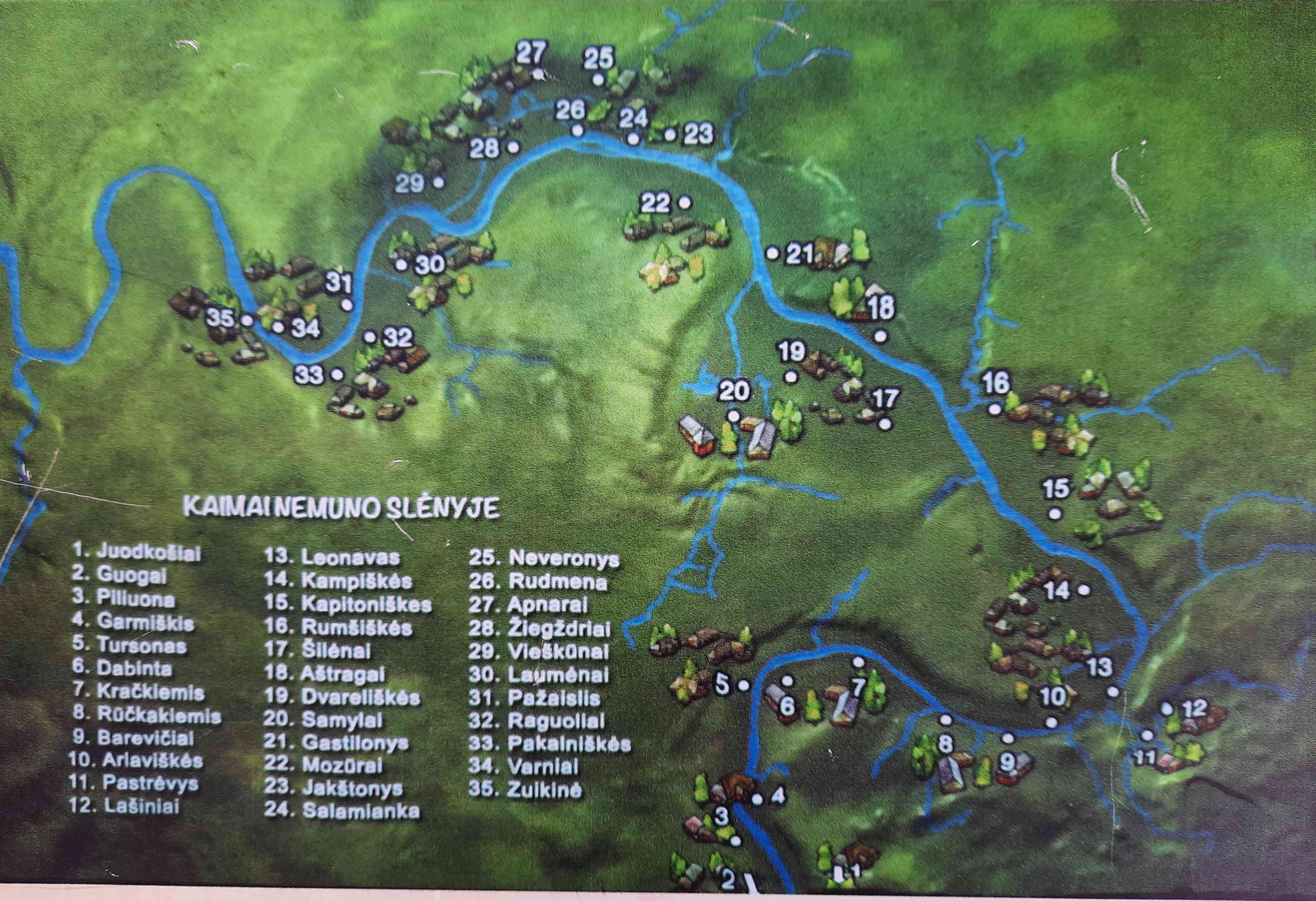
Map of flooded villages

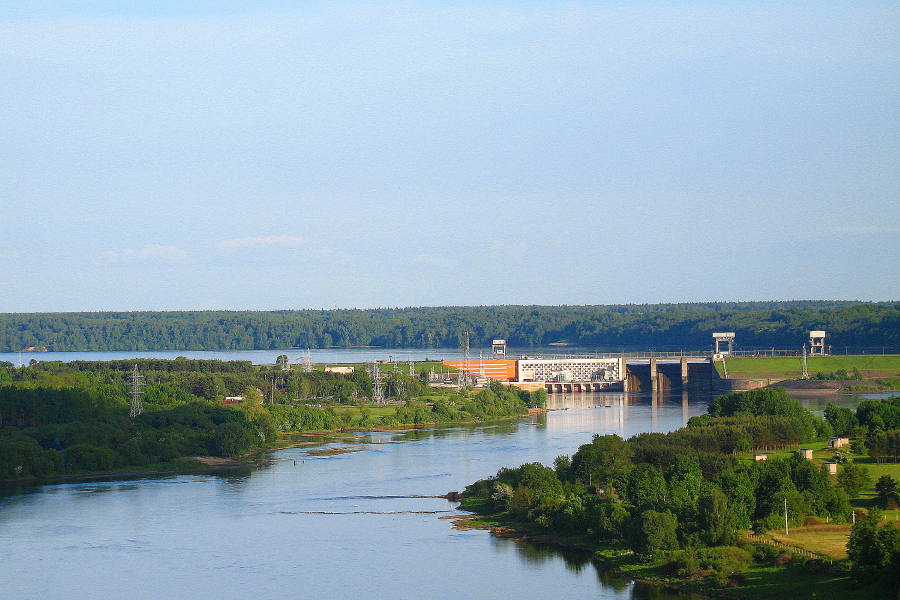
Hydroelectric power plant

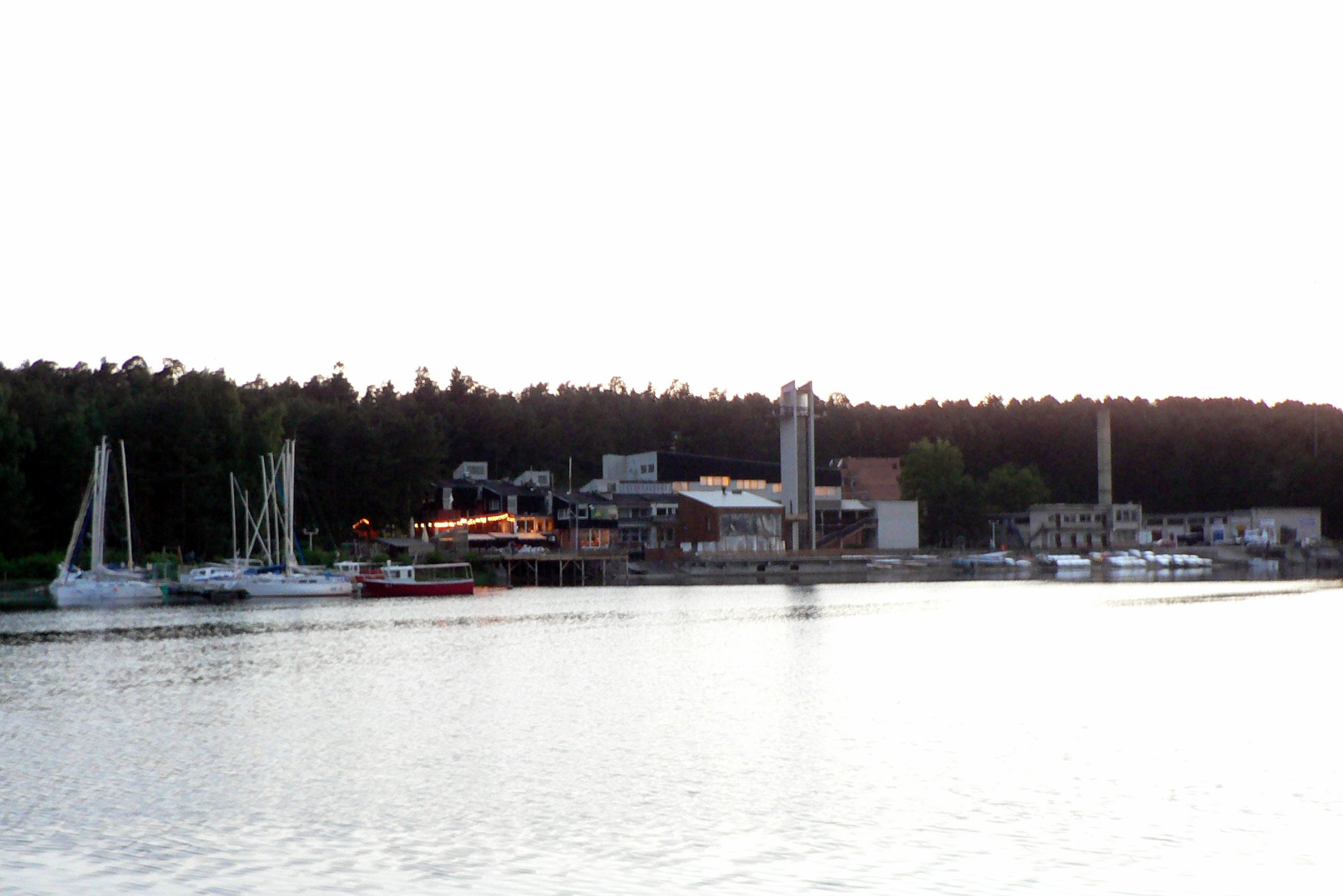
Kaunas Yacht Club

== Sites flooded by the Kaunas Reservoir ==
In anticipation of the reservoir's creation, 721 farms and villages were moved to various locations.

- Apnarai
- Arlaviškės
- Aštragas
- Bartkūnai (Kaišiadorys)
- Dabinta
- Dovainonys moved southeast
- Dvareliškės (Kaunas)
- Garmiškė
- Gastilonys, depopulated
- Guogai
- Jakštonys
- Juodkošiai
- Kalniškės (Kaunas)
- Kampiškės
- Kapitoniškės
- Kračkiemis
- Lašiniai (Kaišiadorys)
- Laumėnai
- Leonavas (Kaunas)
- Maisiejūnai
- Mozūrai, the northern part was flooded, while the southern part was joined to the Samylai village
- Naujos Dvareliškės
- Pakalniškiai (Samylai)
- Pažaislis
- Piliuona moved south
- Rudmena
- Rumšiškės; the entire town was relocated 2km northeast to location of the former villages Byliškės and Vajakiškės
- Rumšiškės mound, a 1st millennium archaeological site
- Salamenka
- Senos Dvareliškės
- Šilėnai (Samylai)
- Tursonas
- Varniai (Kaunas)
- Vieškūnai
- Žiegždriai
