= Elektrėnai Power Plant =

Power plant in Elektrėnai, Lithuania

- Official name: Elektrėnų kompleksas
- Country: Lithuania
- Location: Elektrėnai
- Coordinates: 54°46′15″N 24°38′34″E
- Status: Operational
- Construction began: 1960
- Commission date: 1972
- Owner: Ignitis
- Operator: Ignitis Gamyba AB
- Employees: 700

Thermal power station
- Primary fuel: Natural gas
- Secondary fuel: Heavy fuel oil

Power generation
- Units operational: 2 × 300 MW, 1 × 455 MW
- Nameplate capacity: 1055 MW

External links
- Website: ignitisgamyba.lt
- Commons: Related media on Commons

The Elektrėnai Power Plant or Elektrėnai Complex (Lithuanian: Elektrėnų kompleksas) is a gas- and fuel-oil-fired 1,055 MW electricity generating station near Elektrėnai, Lithuania, about 50 kilometres (31 mi) west of the capital, Vilnius. It is operated by Ignitis gamyba AB, a subsidiary of Ignitis.

== History ==
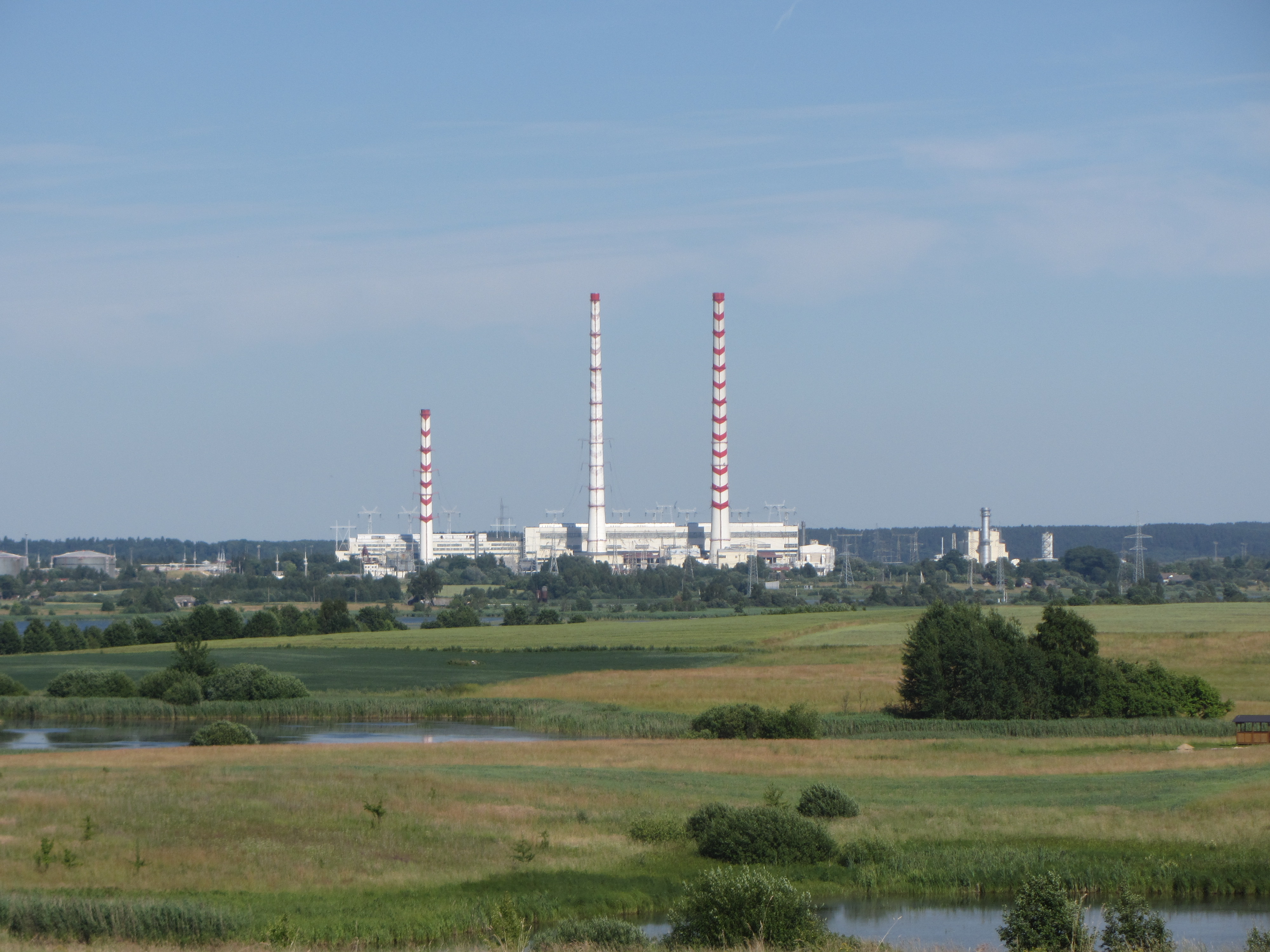
Power plant in 2015, before the demolition of the old chimneys

The plant was built in stages between 1960 and 1972. The Strėva River was dammed to supply it with cooling water, creating the Elektrėnai Reservoir. In 2008, the plant comprised eight units fired with natural gas. In the past, it used heavy fuel oil and, for a brief period in 1990s, a bitumen-based fuel known as Orimulsion imported from Venezuela. It was designed as a base load plant, and generated about 10 TWh per year until 1992. Its operations were then reduced to about 5% of its capacity, since it acted only as a reserve in the Lithuanian power system.

After the shutdown of the Ignalina nuclear power plant in 2009, the plant became the primary source of Lithuania's electrical power. Since the plant did not meet European Union environmental guidelines, improvement projects have been proposed. A flue-gas desulfurization project was completed in September 2008. In December 2007, Ministry of Economy announced that a new 400 MW combined cycle unit would be built at the site as well. The cost of the new unit was estimated at €252 million; 57% of the funding was planned to be supplied by the European Union, 33% by the plant, and the remaining 10% by the National Ignalina Decommissioning Fund. In 2012, a 9th unit was opened, which cost 377 million euros. It was built by a Spanish company Iberdrola Ingenieria y Construccion.

The plant supplies district heating to the town of Elektrėnai, established in 1962, originally to support its workers.

== Units ==
Unit	Commissioned	Power	Status
1	30 December 1962	150 MW	Decommissioned
2	4 November 1963	150 MW	Decommissioned
3	12 September 1964	150 MW	Decommissioned
4	18 August 1965	150 MW	Decommissioned
5	22 June 1967	300 MW	Decommissioned
6	30 June 1968	300 MW	Decommissioned
7	29 December 1971	300 MW	Inactive; in reserve
8	28 September 1972	300 MW	Inactive; in reserve
9	23 October 2012	455 MW	Active

== See also ==
- List of power stations in Lithuania
