= Kruonis =

- Town
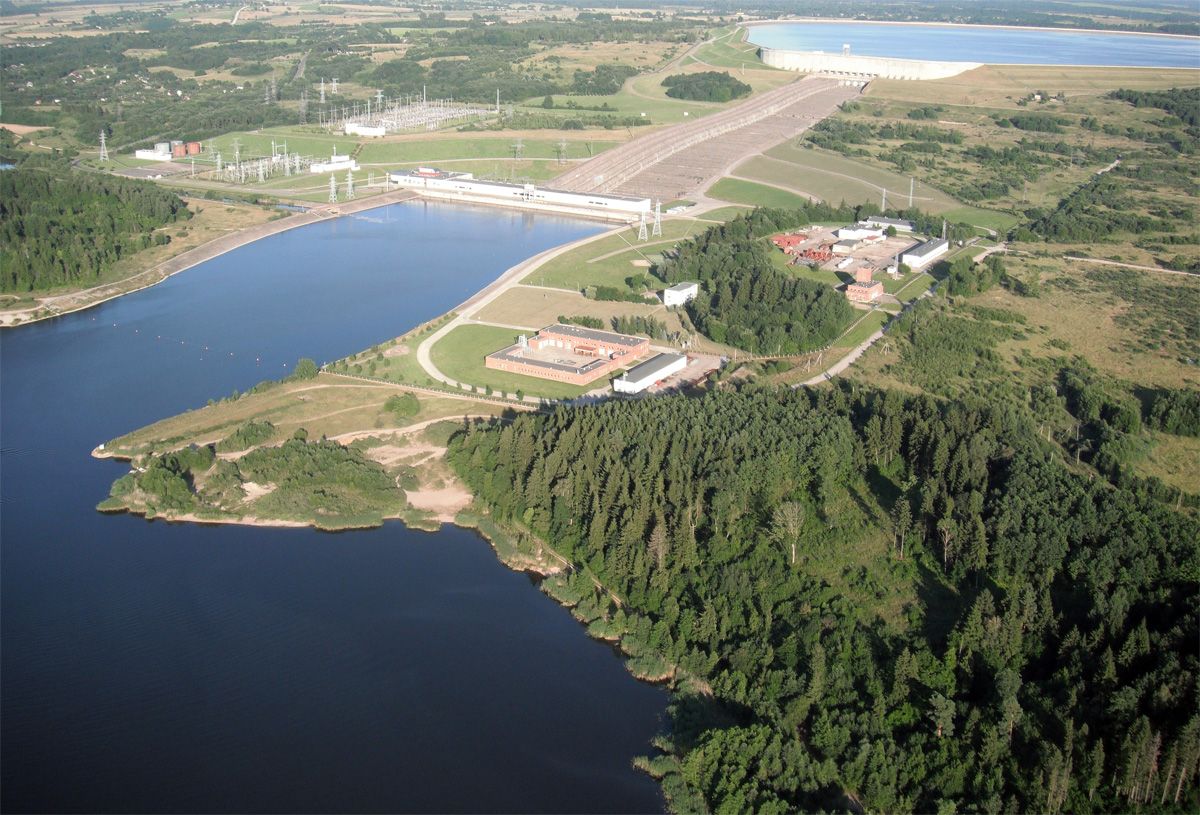
- Kruonis Pumped Storage Plant

- Coat of arms

- Location in Lithuania
- Coordinates: 54°45′30″N 24°14′40″E
- Country: Lithuania
- Ethnographic region: Aukštaitija
- County: Kaunas County

Population (2011)
  - Total: 661
- Time zone: UTC+2 (EET)
  - Summer (DST): UTC+3 (EEST)

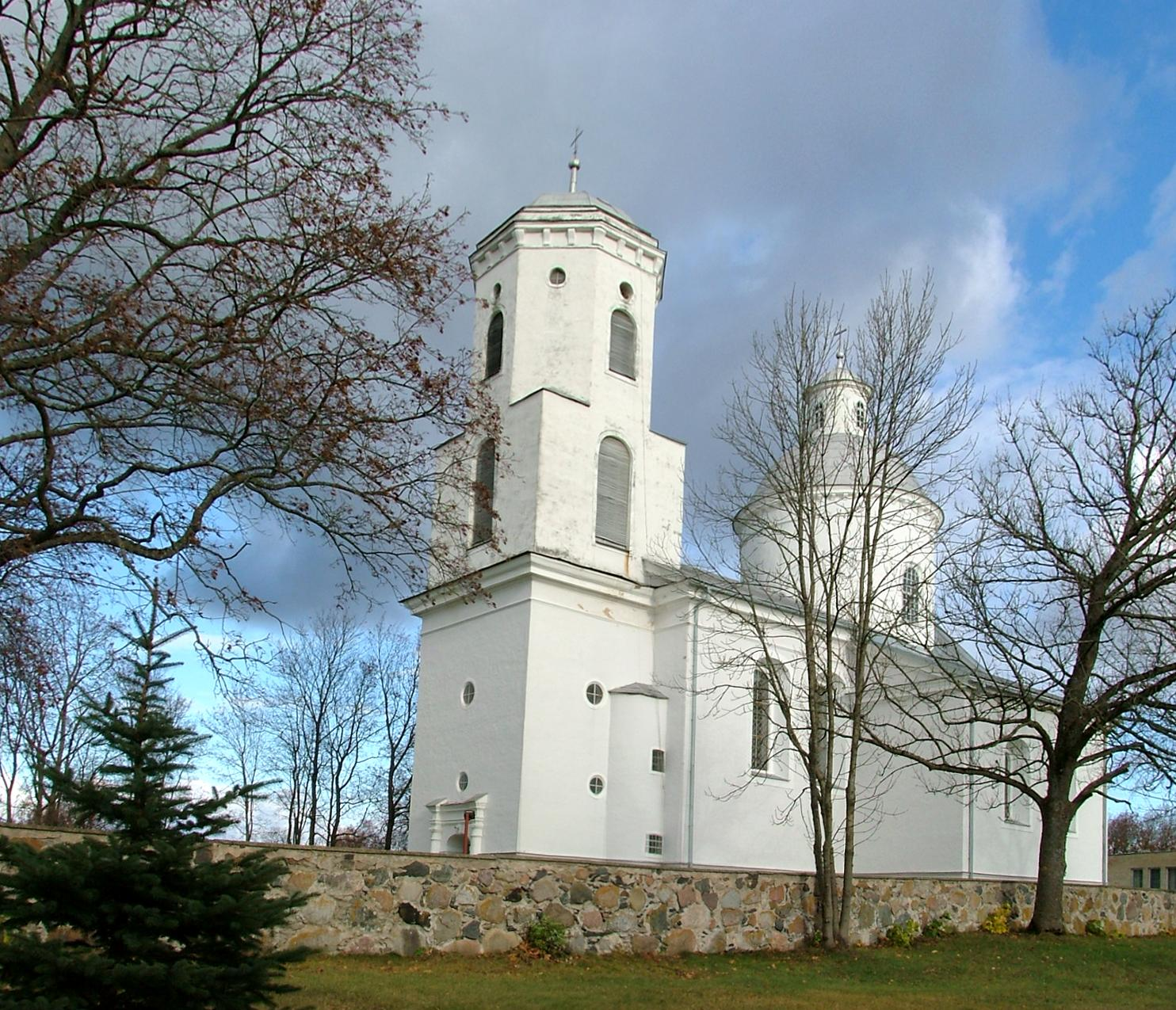
Kruonis church

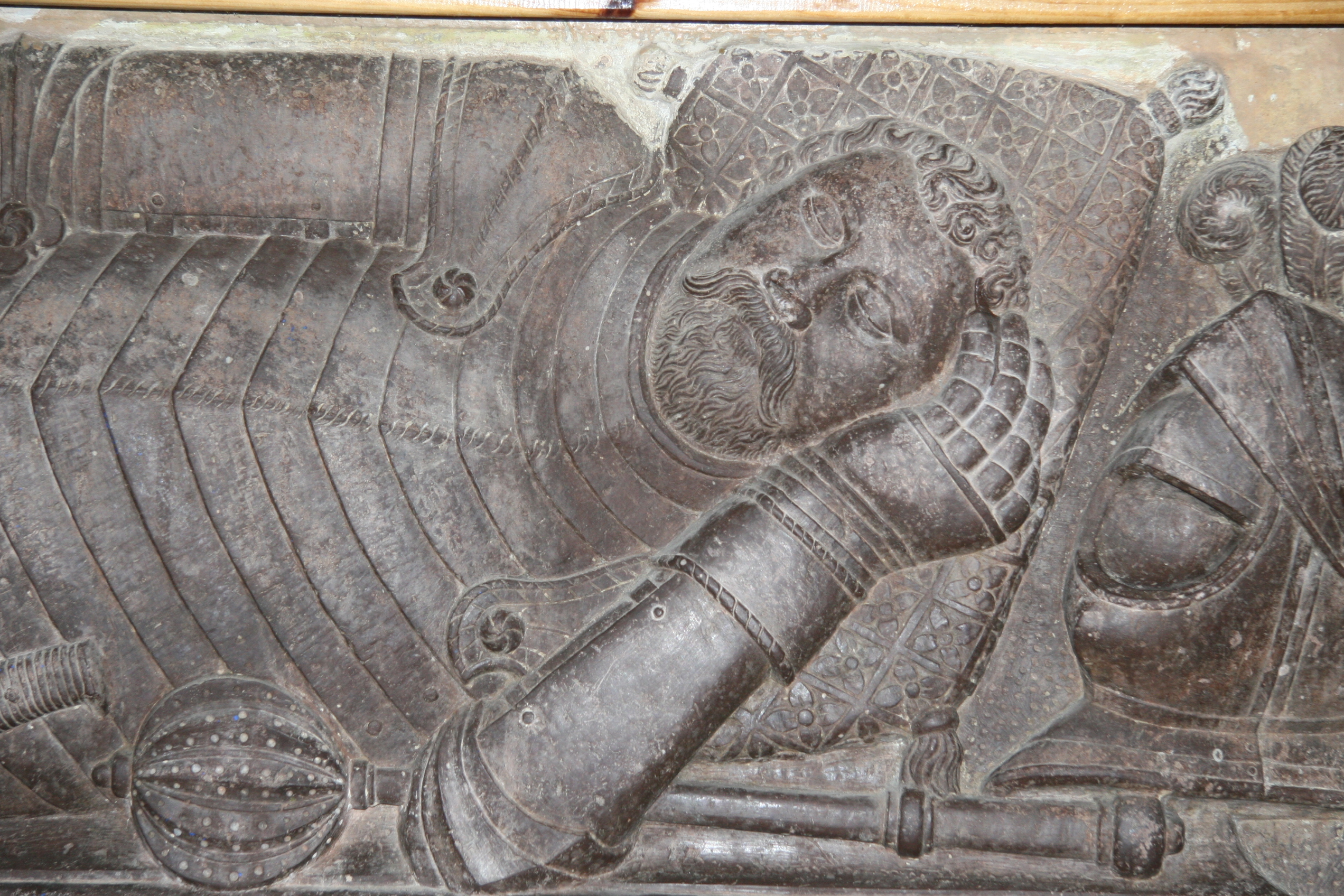
Bohdan Ogiński tombstone in the church of Kruonis

Kruonis (Polish: Kronie, Yiddish: קראָן, Kron) is a small town, located 37 km (23 mi) east of Kaunas, in Kaunas County, central Lithuania. The name of Kruonis comes from a small creek Kruonė. In 2011 it had a population of 661. The center of Kruonis is a state-protected urbanistic monument. The only in the Baltic States Kruonis Pumped Storage Plant (the KPSP) is situated 3 km (1.9 mi) north of Kruonis. Each year a music festival Renesanso naktys Kruonyje (The Nights of Renaissance in Kruonis) takes place in the church where the classical music of the composers of 16th-17th centuries being performed.

== History ==
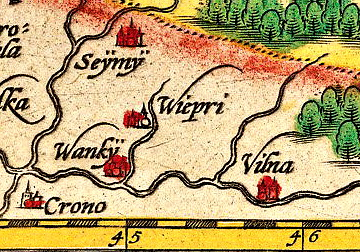
Kruonis (Crono) in the old map of Livonia - Livoniae nova descriptio, 1573

In the 15th century, a small settlement started to establish itself around the Kruonis' manor of the Grand Duke of Lithuania. The first church was built in Kruonis by Kazimieras Jogailaitis in 1472. It was built in the Catholic cemetery, using wood. Current Catholic church is located in the building which was built as a Uniate church in 1626 by the colonel of the Grand Duchy of Lithuania, distinguished in the battles with the Muscovy, Cossacks and Livonia, Podkomorzy of Trakai Bohdan Ogiński. It was a first Uniate church in Lithuania – its architecture is a rare blend of the styles of Lithuanian Renaissance and Byzantine architecture. In 1628–1629, by the church a monastery of Basilian monks was established. In the beginning of the 17th century, the palatial Renaissance manor was built, but did not survive up to this day, except some ruins – it was badly damaged in 1812 during Napoleonic Wars. The people of Kruonis were active participants of the January Uprising. Many of them after deported to the remote territories in Russia and were replaced by the colonists from Russia which were transferred to Kruonis. The Catholic church was closed in 1866 and demolished by Russian authority as a reaction to January Uprising. In the beginning of the 20th century cultural and social life revived – a branch of the Lithuanian Catholic Women Society (Lietuvių katalikių moterų draugija) was established in 1913, Lithuanian spectacles were shown, Kruonis had a choir.

On 18 July 1920, near Kruonis, during the Lithuanian Wars of Independence Lithuanian army disarmed the Polish brigade, took 400 soldiers into captivity, confiscated 6 cannons and 254 horses.

In July 1941, 19 Kruonis Jews were murdered in a mass execution. On August 15, 1941, some Kruonis Jews, mostly men, were taken in the direction of Kaunas and murdered, together with Jews from Darsūniškis, in the Gojus Forest, by Lithuanian nazis from Kruonis. At the end of summer 1941, Rollkommando Hamann and policemen from Pakuonis shot 99 Jewish women, children, and old people from Darsūniškis, Kruonis, and Pakuonis in Darsūniškis.

After the Soviet occupation in the surroundings of Kruonis Lithuanian partisans of The Great Fight (Didžiosios Kovos) military district were active. It is estimated that in the Gojus Forest there are 40–60 partisans murdered and buried by the MGB-NKVD. Soviet occupants deported 25 people of Kruonis.

== Industry ==
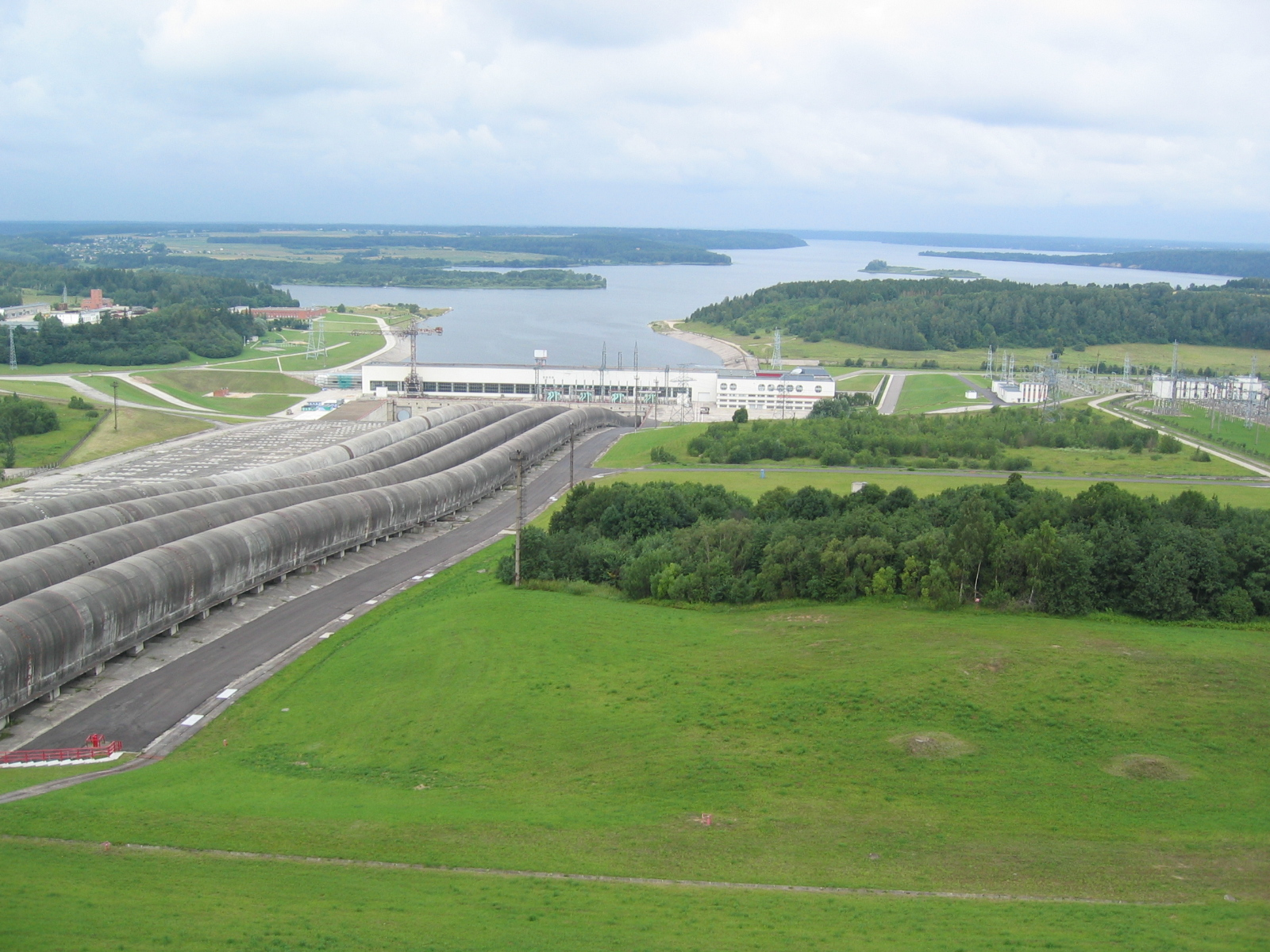
Kruonis Pumped Storage Plant

Kruonis PSP Industrial Park and Kruonis Technology Park were created as the location, infrastructure, and low energy costs fit quite well for establishing data centers.
