= Kruonis Pumped Storage Plant =

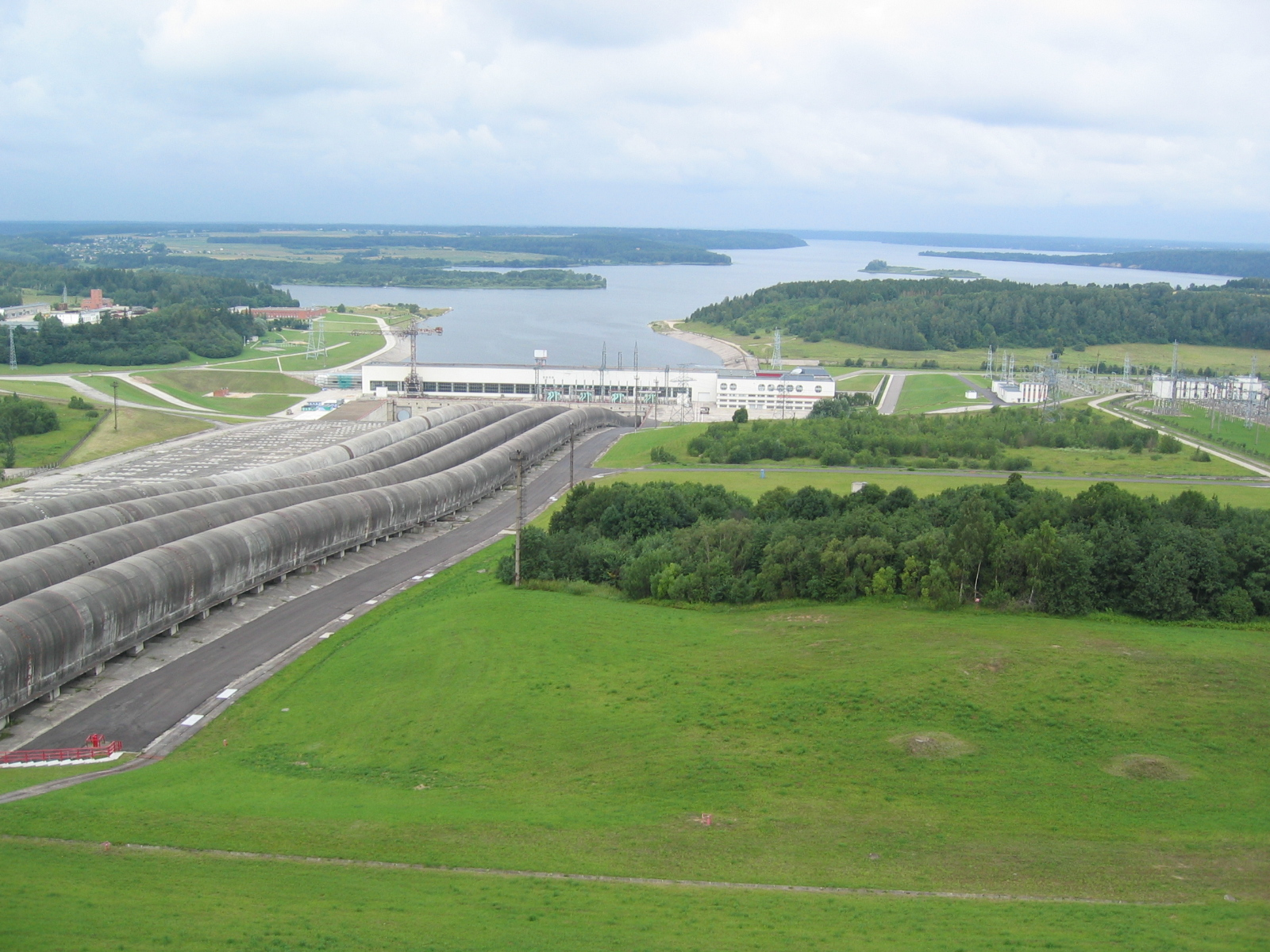
- Country: Lithuania
- Location: Kruonis
- Coordinates: 54°47′56″N 24°14′51″E
- Status: Operational
- Construction began: 1978
- Opening date: 1992
- Owner(s): AB „Ignitis gamyba“

Upper reservoir
- Creates: Kruonis Upper
- Total capacity: 48,000,000 m^{3} (39,000 acre⋅ft)

Lower reservoir
- Creates: Kaunas Reservoir
- Total capacity: 460,000,000 m^{3} (370,000 acre⋅ft)

Power Station
- Hydraulic head: 103.5 m (340 ft)
- Pump-generators: 4 × 225 MW reversible Francis-type
- Installed capacity: 900 MW

Kruonis Pumped Storage Plant (the KPSP) is a pumped storage hydroelectric power plant located near Kruonis, Lithuania, 34 km (21 mi) east of Kaunas. Its main purpose is to provide grid energy storage. It operates in conjunction with the Kaunas Hydroelectric Power Plant. During periods of low demand, usually at night, Kruonis PSHP raises water from the lower Kaunas reservoir to the upper one using cheap surplus energy. The station is designed to have an installed capacity of 1,600 MW but only four 225 MW generators are currently operational. With a fully filled upper reservoir the plant can generate 900 MW for about 12 hours.

The KPSP uses hydro-resources of artificial water pools existing at different geographical levels.

The electricity from this power plant is supplied to a 330 kV electricity line to Elektrėnai, where the largest fossil fuel plant in Lithuania is operating, and Kaunas. At times of surplus electricity generation, the KPSP uses the surplus electricity to pump water from the lower pool to the upper pool.

At times of electricity output deficit, the Kruonis PSP operates as a regular hydro power plant, letting water flow from the upper pool to the lower pool to generate additional electricity. Kruonis Plant is the only pumped-storage station in the Baltic states.

The Kruonis PSP Industrial Park and Kruonis Technology Park were created as the location, infrastructure and low electricity price are attractive for data centers.

A neighbourhood for workers of the Kruonis pumped storage plant was built in the 1980s and early 1990s in Elektrėnai, doubling the size of the town.

== See also ==
- List of pumped-storage hydroelectric power stations
- List of power stations in Lithuania
