= Kauno Marios Regional Park =

Regional park in Lithuania

Coordinates: 54°52′N 24°7′E

- IUCN category V (protected landscape/seascape)
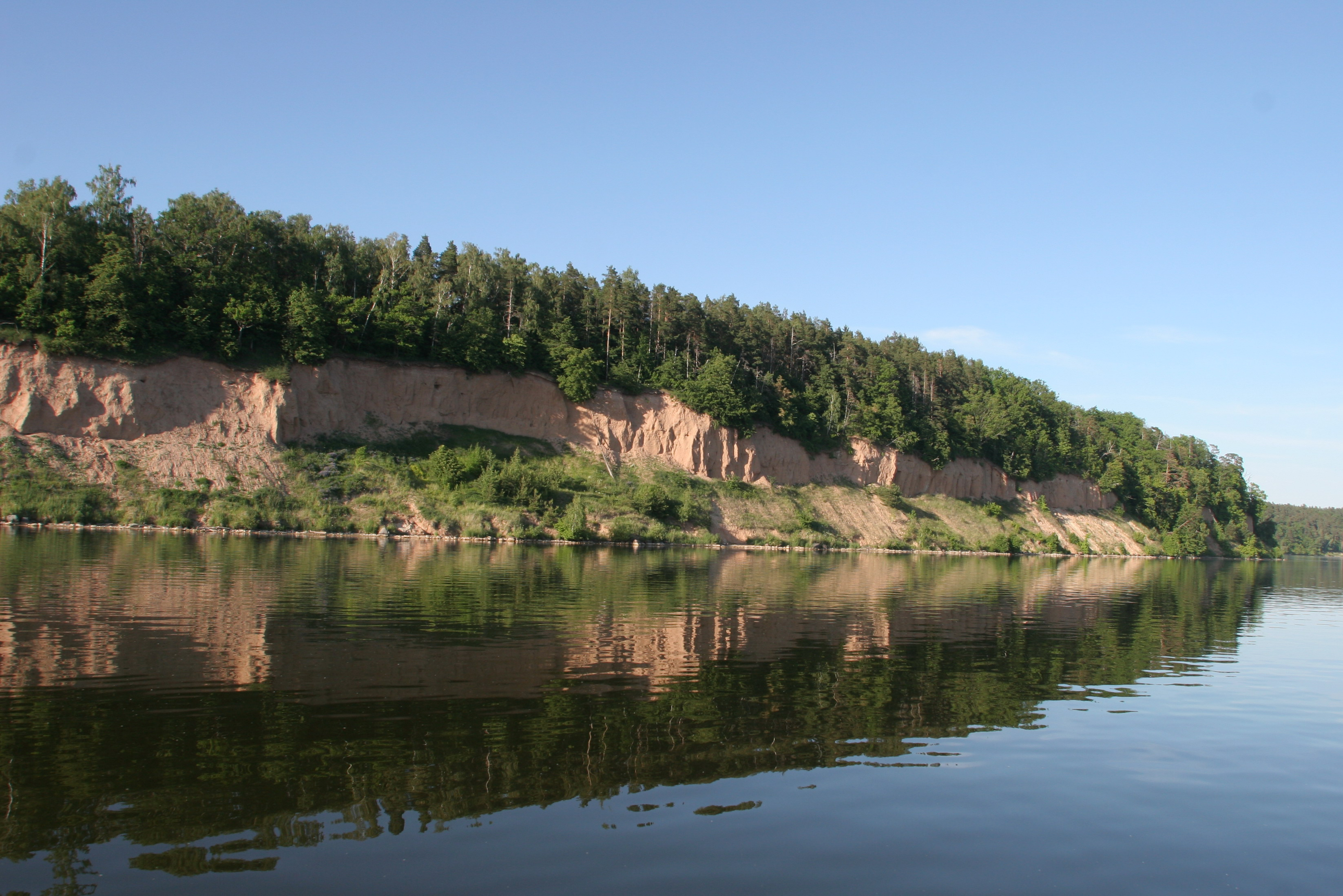
- Kauno marios reservoir
- Location: Kaunas County, Lithuania
- Nearest city: Kaunas
- Area: 101,730 ha (251,400 acres)
- Established: 1992
- Website: www.kaunomarios.lt

Kauno Marios Regional Park was established in 1992 with the purpose to protect the unique lower landscape of Kaunas Reservoir, its natural ecosystem, and cultural heritage. It covers a total area of 101.73 km² (water - 51.45 km², forests - 38.78 km²) and is one of the 30 regional parks in Lithuania.

The man-made Kaunas Reservoir altered the local landscape and now one can see newly formed exposures, altered mouths of tributaries to the Neman River (Lithuanian: Nemunas) (what local people now call fiords). The shallower edges of the reservoir are becoming swampy and attract almost all known species of water birds in Lithuania. Old pine forests at Rumšiškės and Dabinta are rich in plant and animal diversity. Here lives one of the biggest population of edible dormice.

Besides the reservoir itself, the area includes Arlaviškis botanical reserve famous for its juniper valley, Girionys Park, a landscape park established on the bank of Kaunas Reservoir, in the eastern edge of Kaunas. It is the biggest park by area and the richest by its number of tree species in Lithuania. The total area of the park together with the village Girionys is 130 ha. Trees in the park have been planted to commemorate the considerable events and famous foresters as well. Since 1963 a tradition among Kaunas Forestry college graduates has been established: every year students plant the oak in this grove. The eastern part of the park leans to Raguoliai pine stand. This forest (81 ha) and protective plantings of Kaunas Reservoir slopes (39 ha) are managed as forest park, so today the total area of the park reaches 250 ha.

Cultural heritage objects include Pažaislis monastery, a 17th-century baroque architecture masterpiece which hosts an annual Pažaislis Music Festival, open-air museum in Rumšiškės covering 175 ha, Salomėja Nėris museum in Palemonas which hosts annual Poetry Spring. There are also more than 20 historical and archeological monuments. Pakalniškiai, Vieškūnai, Lašiniai, Samylai, Dovainoniai hillforts and Dovainoniai/Kapitoniškiai, Maisiejūnai/Surgantiškiai tumulusses are located in the park.

== Gallery ==
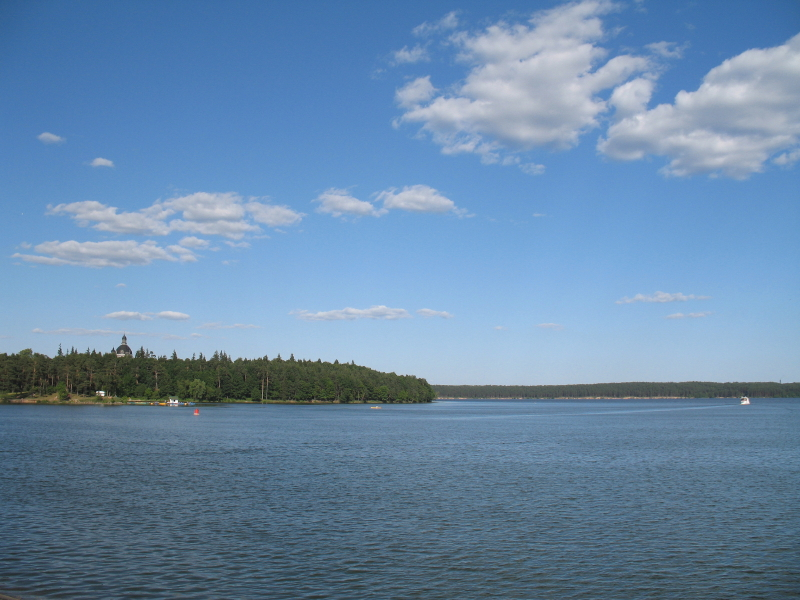
Kauno marios reservoir

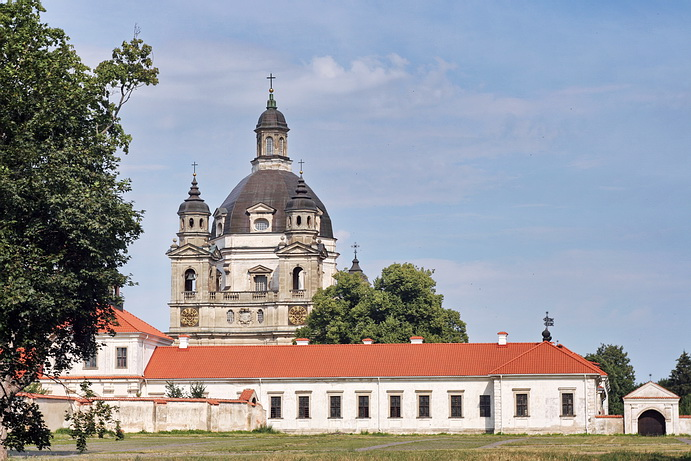
Pažaislis monastery in the Kauno Marios Regional Park

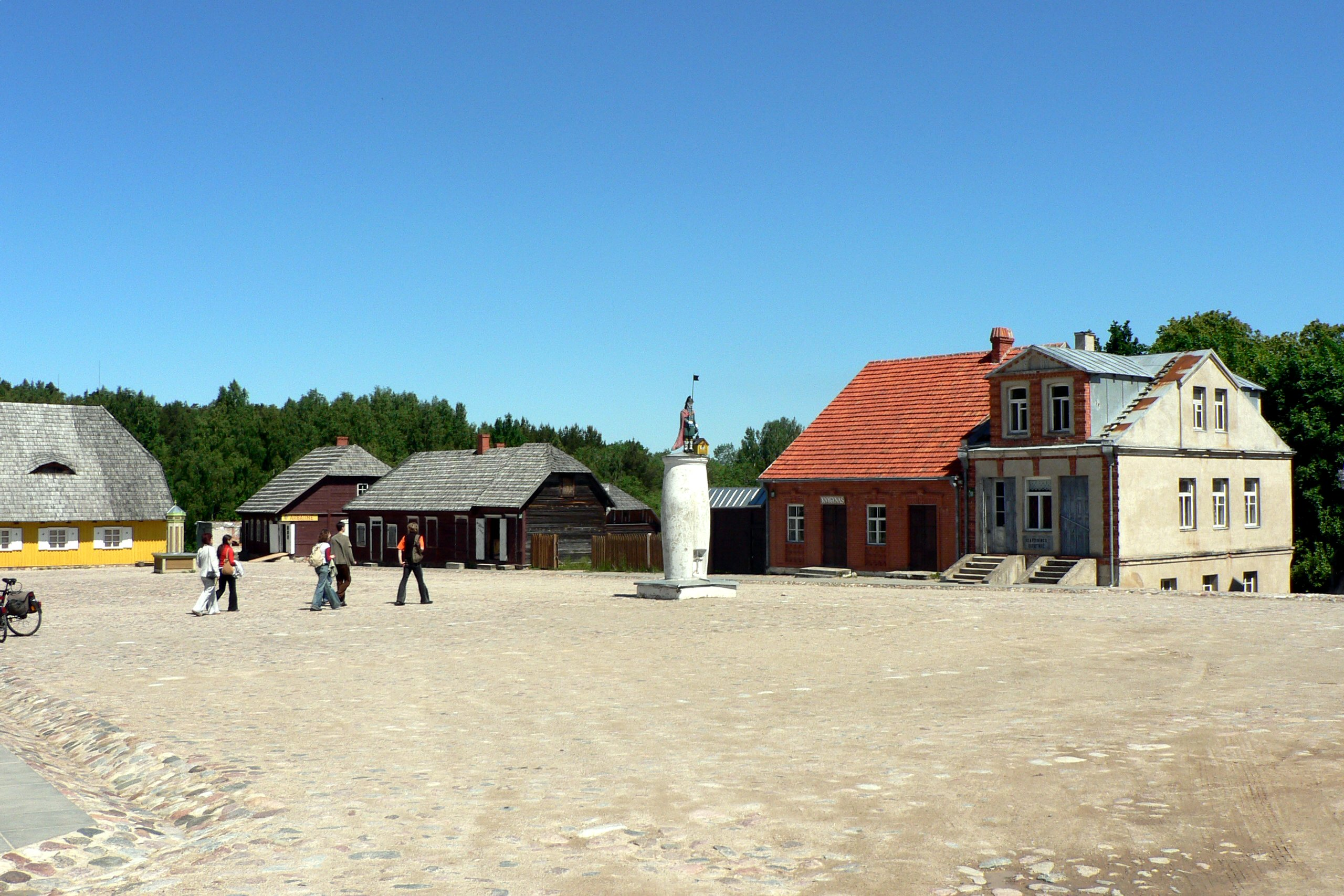
Ethnographic museum in Rumšiškės
