= Ignitis =

Energy holding company based in Lithuania

Ignitis grupė AB

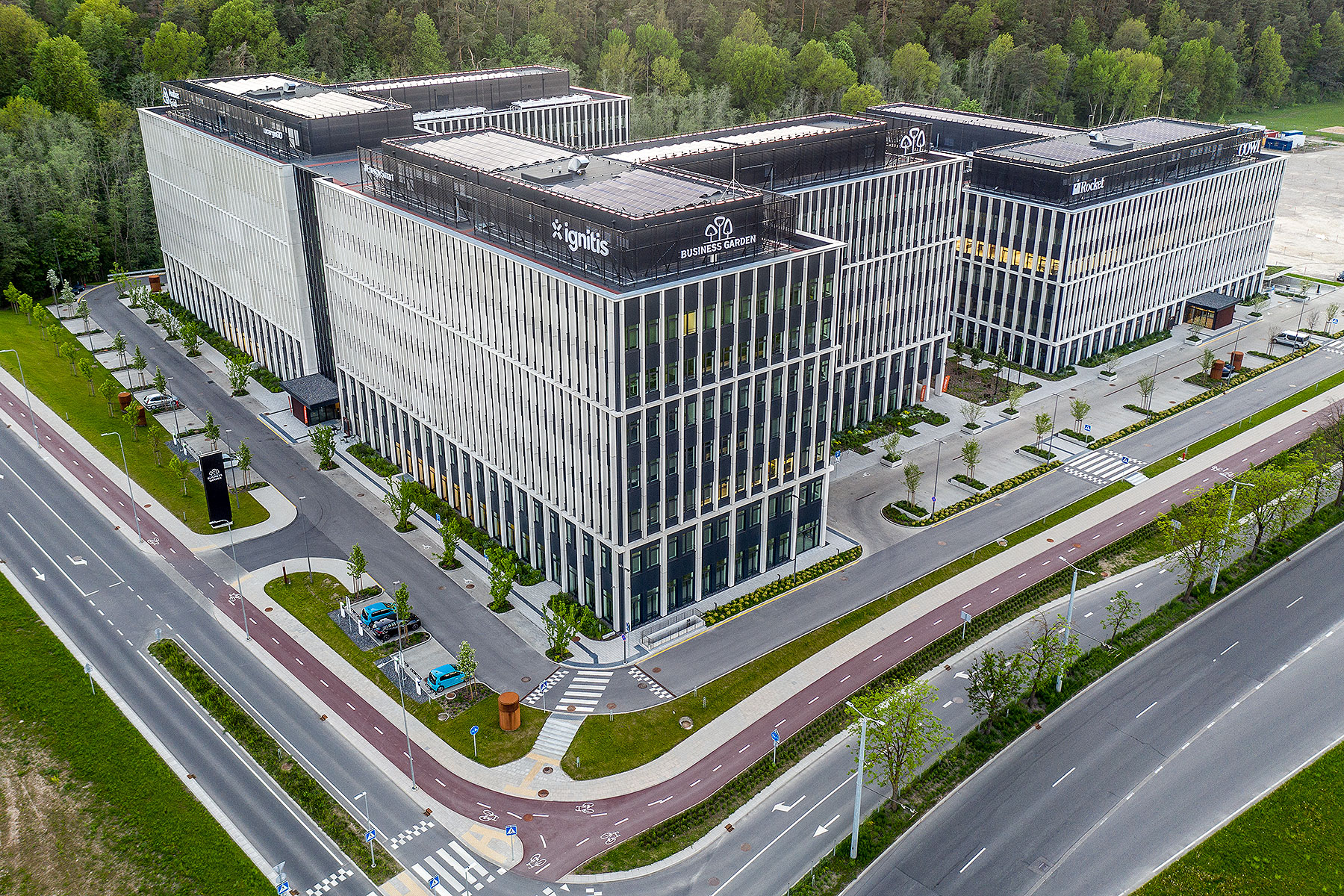
- Ignitis Group office in Vilnius
- Type: State-owned enterprise
- Traded as: LSE: IGN
- ISIN: XS1646530565; XS1853999313
- Industry: energy industry
- Predecessor: Lietuvos energija
- Founded: 26 March 1991
- Founder: Ministry of Energy
- Headquarters: Vilnius, Lithuania
- Area served: Lithuania; Latvia; Estonia; Poland; Finland
- Key people: Darius Maikštėnas (CEO); Alfonso Faubel (Chairman of Supervisory Board)
- Products: Electric power Heat; Natural gas
- Revenue: ▲€2.5 billion (2025)
- Operating income: ▼€315.4 million (2025)
- Net income: ▼€225.7 million (2025)
- Total assets: ▲€6.2 billion (2025)
- Total equity: ▲€2.4 billion (2025)
- Owner: Ministry of Finance
- Number of employees: 4,851
- Parent: Finance Ministry of Lithuania
- Subsidiaries: Energijos skirstymo operatorius
- Website: ignitisgrupe.lt

Ignitis Group (Ignitis grupė AB; former name: Lietuvos Energija UAB) is a state-owned energy holding company located in Vilnius, Lithuania. The Group’s core business is focused on operating Lithuania’s electricity distribution network (Networks) and managing and developing its Green Generation Portfolio (Green Generation). The Group also manages strategically important reserve capacities (Reserve Capacities) and provides services to its customers (Customers & Solutions), including the supply of electricity and natural gas, solar, e-mobility, energy efficiency and innovative energy solutions for private and business customers.

Ignitis Group shares are predominantly owned by the Ministry of Finance of the Republic of Lithuania, with the current Chairman of the Board and CEO of the company being Darius Maikštėnas. It is the fifth largest company in the Baltics.

The initial public offering was made on 7 October 2020. Ignitis Group shares are listed in Nasdaq Vilnius and London Stock Exchange.

== History ==
Lietuvos Energija was founded in 1991. It was a vertically integrated state-owned enterprise that owned and operated all electrical and heating businesses in Lithuania apart from the Ignalina Nuclear Power Plant. In 1997, the company was registered as Lietuvos Energija AB and it was partly privatized. The government kept 86.5% of the shares while 8.5% was privatized to the company's workers, and 5% to the Swedish company Vattenfall. In 2002, power generation companies AB Lietuvos Elektrinė and AB Mažeikių Elektrinė, and distribution grid companies AB Rytų skirstomieji tinklai and AB Vakarų skirstomieji tinklai were separated from Lietuvos Energija. In 2007, Lietuvos Energija acquired a stake in UAB Geoterma, the owner and operator of the Klaipėda Geothermal Demonstration Plant.

In 2008, Lietuvos Energija was transferred to newly established energy holding company LEO LT. After dissolution of LEO LT in 2010, Lietuvos Energija became a subsidiary of UAB Visagino Atomine Elektrine, a state-owned project company of the Visaginas Nuclear Power Plant. At the same year, the company acquired Lietuvos Elektrinė, another subsidiary of Visagino Atomine Elektrine. In September 2012, the transmission system operator Litgrid and the electricity market operator Baltpool were separated from Lietuvos Energija and spun off to the state-owned company EPSO-G.

In 2013, Lietuvos Energija AB changed its name to Lietuvos Energijos Gamyba AB, and its parent company UAB Visagino Atominė Elektrinė has changed its name to Lietuvos Energija UAB.

In October 2017, Lietuvos Energija acquired the Vilnius Combined Heat and Power Plant (Vilnius Power Plant-3) from Vilniaus šilumos tinklai. In 2018, Lietuvos Energija bought Lithuanian wind park operators UAB Vejo Vatas and UAB Vejo Gusis with a 34-MW wind portfolio. It also acquired a 50-MW wind park project in Poland.

On 5 September 2019, Lietuvos Energija was renamed Ignitis Group. Lietuvos Energijos Tiekimas, Energijos Tiekimas, Gilė and Litgas were merged to form Ignitis UAB. Lietuvos Energijos Gamyba became Ignitis Gamyba and Lietuvos Energija Renewables became Ignitis Renewables. Other subsidiaries, except Energijos Skirstymo Operatorius, were also renamed accordingly.

In 2020, Ignitis Group implemented the initial public distribution of shares (English IPO), after which its shares were listed on the Nasdaq Vilnius stock exchange. The IPO raised 450€ million EUR capital while the state continues to control a 74.99% controlling share package.

On September 9, 2021, Ignitis Group acquired 100% of the capital of Ignitis Gamyba after delisting the later from Nasdaq Vilnius alongside Energijos skirstymo operatorius. In July 2024, Ignitis transferred equipment from its TPP-3 Vilnius thermal power plant to support Ukraine's energy infrastructure as part of the Baltics states mission to support the freedom.

=== Investment in renewable energy across the Baltic countries ===
In 2023, Copenhagen Infrastructure Partners and Ignitis won the tender in an auction to develop offshore wind farms in the Liivi 1 and Liivi 2 areas for Estonia in the Baltic Sea. In November 2024, the Group announced its intent to participate in second tender to develop 700 MW offshore wind capacity in the Baltic Sea off the coast of Lithuania. It will attempt to identify a partner for the project. This followed Ignitis' win of the first tender in 2023 with a partner.

The company also plans significant investment in Latvia. The company has announced plans to invest €178 million in solar energy in Latvia through three solar farms in Kuldīga and Bauska. Ignitis plans to invest at least €700 million in solar and wind projects in Latvia. It also plans an investment of €115 million to develop the largest fast-charging network for electric cars in Latvia by 2026.

The company manages investment in renewable energy through its subsidiary, Ignitis Renewables.

== Operations ==

Ignitis Gamyba (100% stake owned by Ignitis Group) owns the Elektrėnai Power Plant, the Kruonis Pumped Storage Plant and the Kaunas Hydroelectric Power Plant. Meanwhile, the Vilnius Combined Heat and Power Plant is 100% owned directly by Ignitis Group. Ignitis supplies electricity through Energijos Skirstymo Operatorius AB (100% stake owned by Ignitis Group) and natural gas through Ignitis UAB. Its subsidiary UAB Ignitis Renewables is responsible for the wind and solar energy projects. In addition to Lithuania, Ignitis operates in Estonia, Latvia, Poland, and Finland.
