= Kaunas Hydroelectric Power Plant =

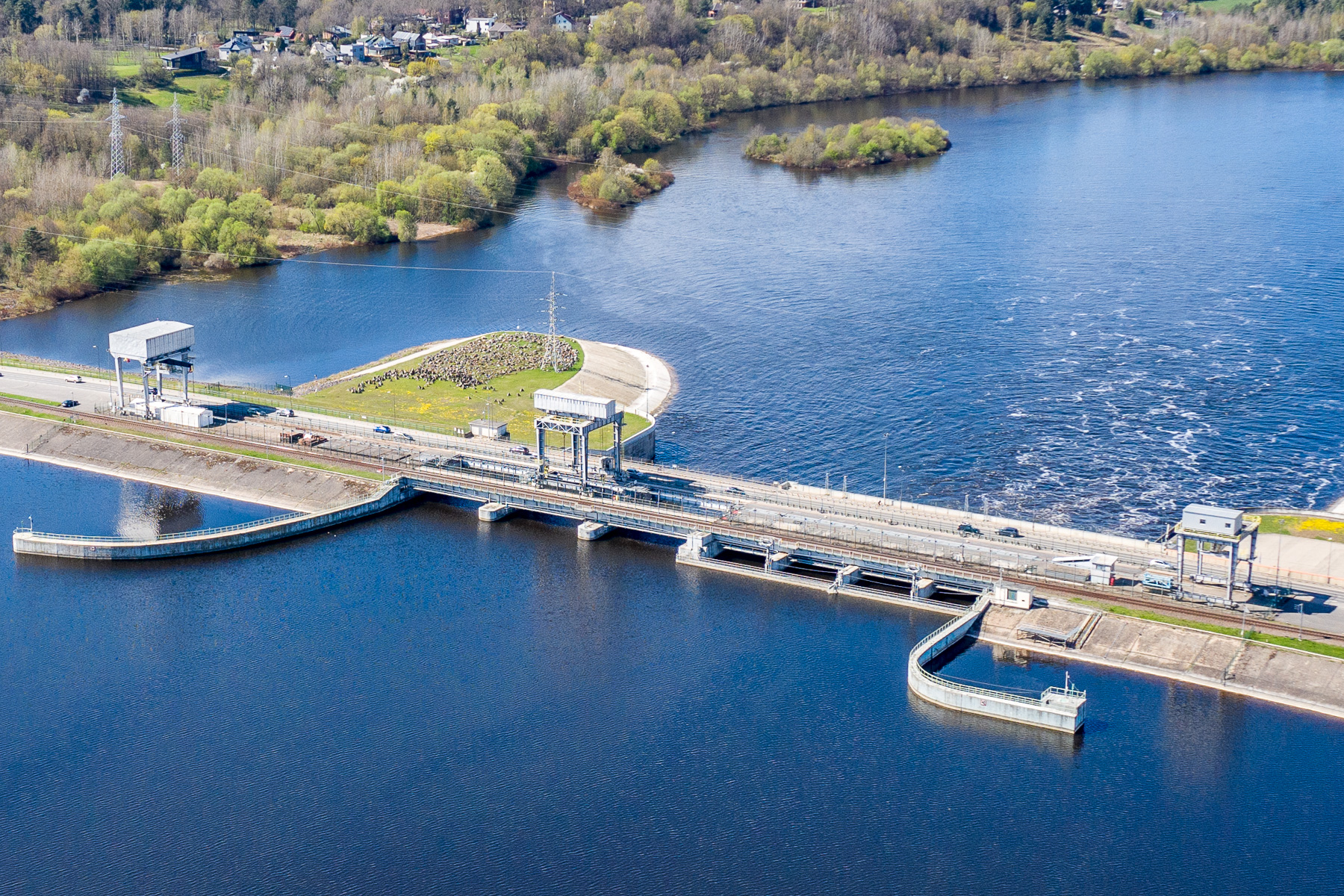
- Aerial view in 2023
- Interactive map of Kaunas Hydroelectric Power Plant
- Official name: Kauno Hidroelektrinė
- Country: Lithuania
- Location: Kaunas
- Coordinates: 54°52′27″N 23°59′56″E
- Status: Operational
- Construction began: 1955
- Owner: Ignitis grupė

Power Station
- Commission date: 1959
- Type: Conventional
- Turbines: 4
- Installed capacity: 100.8 MW
- Capacity factor: 26.0% (2020)
- 2020 generation: 230 GW·h

The Kaunas Hydroelectric Power Plant (Lithuanian: Kauno Algirdo Brazausko hidroelektrinė) is a hydroelectric power plant located on the Nemunas River about 7.4 kilometres (4.6 mi) southeast of Kaunas, Lithuania. It was completed in 1960 and its dam created the Kaunas Reservoir. Owned by Ignitis Group, it operates in conjunction with the Kruonis Pumped Storage Plant.

The plant consists of 4 turbines each rated at 25.2 MW for a total power of 100.8 megawatts. It supplies about 4% of the electrical demand in Lithuania, in 2020 its production was 0.23 TWh.

A renovation was begun in 2005, with work to be performed in partnership with the multinational conglomerate Alstom. The first phase was completed in November 2008; completion is scheduled for the end of 2009.

== See also ==
- List of power stations in Lithuania
