= 2023 Lithuania–Latvia pipeline explosion =

Explosion on 13 January 2023

- Area around Pasvalys District
- Date: 13 January 2023
- Time: c. 16:57 (EET, UTC+2)
- Location: Joniškėlis Street, Pasvalio Vienkiemiai, Pasvalys District Municipality, Panevėžys County, Lithuania; 56°3′21.6″N 24°22′15.6″E
- Type: Gas explosion
- Motive: Accidental (presumed)
- Participants: Under investigation
- Deaths: 0
- Injuries: 0

On 13 January 2023, an explosion occurred on the Lithuania–Latvia Interconnection in Pasvalio Vienkiemiai, Pasvalys District Municipality, Lithuania.

At 16:57, Police department of Pasvalys District received the call about the fire in Pasvalio Vienkiemiai village. Flames reached up to 50 m in height and could be seen at a distance of at least 17 km. As a precaution the entire village of Valakėliai was evacuated. As a result Lithuania stopped natural gas transit to Latvia, while consumers in northern Lithuania were supplied by alternative pipelines. 18km of pipeline was disconnected from the main grid to allow gas to burn out. Firefighters extinguished the flames around 21:00 local time. By midnight Lithuania restored gas transit between Lithuania and Latvia at reduced capacity.

== Cause ==
According to the Amber Grid Chief Executive, they do not have evidence that the explosion was an attack, however said that it will be investigated.

On 14 January 2023, representative of Panevėžys County Police Office confirmed that the cause is current under investigation in line with Lithuanian Penal Code's article 278 punishable by prison sentence up to 5 years.

== Explosion ==
At 16:57, Police department of Pasvalys District received the call about the fire in Pasvalio Vienkiemiai village after a locals heard a loud noise. Flames reached up to 50 m in height and could be seen at a distance of at least 17 km. Buildings within 1km radius overheated above 100 C, therefore firefighters had to cool down the buildings with water. Firefighters used drone to scan the area and monitor fire spreading.

18km of pipeline was disconnected from the main Amber Grid system to allow gas to burn out. Fire stopped at around 21:00 local time.

== Evacuations ==
Nearby village of Valakėliai was instructed to evacuate completely. Temporary rescue centre was established in Joniškėlis Gabrielė Petkevičaitė-Bitė Gymnasium building with 120 beds provided for the ones seeking shelter. On 14 January 2023, locals returned to Valakėliai village.

Locals from villages of Paberžiai and Balsiai were advised to evacuate and temporary shelter in Pasvalys Lėvens primary school. Pasvalys District Municipality officials encourages outside of evacuation zone to close all doors and windows and remain calm.

== Transport ==
All traffic via KK150 national route in Pasvalys District was closed and traffic diverted via rural gravel roads. Due high temperature from the flames the surface of KK150 road was damaged and at least 2km of road was no longer suitable for use.

== Repairs ==
On 14 January 2023, Gintautas Gegužinskas, Pasvalys District mayor confirmed that it will take minimum a week to repair the damaged Lithuania–Latvia Interconnection.

On 16 January 2023 13:30 local time, the repairs were fully finished and gas supply to Latvia restored at full capacity. Lithuania exporting up to 90 GWh per day of natural gas to Latvia via the pipeline after the repairs.
