= List of main natural gas pipelines in Lithuania =

Biggest pipelines in Lithuania.

The following page lists biggest natural gas pipelines in Lithuania.

First natural gas pipeline in Lithuania was built in 1961 from Ivatsevichy to Vilnius.

Name	Towns	Coordinates	Max. Discharge (per annum)	Years	Notes
Gas Interconnection Poland–Lithuania	(Poland) Rembelszczyzna, (Lithuania) Jauniūnai		2.3 billion m^{3}	2022	
Klaipėda–Jurbarkas pipeline	(Lithuania) Klaipėda, (Lithuania) Jurbarkas			2013	Supply from Klaipėda LNG FSRU
Klaipėda–Kuršėnai pipeline	(Lithuania) Klaipėda, (Lithuania) Kuršėnai		2 billion m^{3}	2015	Supply from Klaipėda LNG FSRU
Klaipėda–Panevėžys pipeline	(Lithuania) Klaipėda, (Lithuania) Šiauliai, (Lithuania) Panevėžys		Various		Supply from Klaipėda LNG FSRU
Lithuania–Latvia Interconnection	(Latvia) Riga, (Lithuania) Vilnius		4.58 billion m^{3} (planned)	1962	To be expanded
Minsk–Kaliningrad Interconnection	(Belarus) Minsk, (Lithuania) Vilnius, (Russia) Kaliningrad		2.5 billion m^{3}		Transit
Pabradė–Visaginas pipeline	(Lithuania) Pabradė, (Lithuania) Visaginas			2005	Supply to Nuclear Power Heat Plants
