= Klaipėda–Kuršėnai pipeline =

Natural gas pipeline

- Map of Klaipėda–Kuršėnai pipeline

Location
- Country: Lithuania
- Direction: east-west, west-east
- Start: Klaipėda, Lithuania
- To: Kuršėnai, Lithuania
- Runs alongside: Klaipėda–Panevėžys pipeline

General information
- Type: natural gas
- Operator: Amber Grid
- Construction started: 2014
- Commissioned: 2 October 2015

Technical information
- Length: 110 km (68 mi)
- Maximum discharge: 2 billion cubic metres per annum (71×10^{9} cu ft/a)
- Diameter: 800 mm (31 in)

Klaipėda–Kuršėnai pipeline (Lithuanian: Dujotiekis Klaipėda-Kuršėnai) is a natural gas pipeline serving as capacity expansion that connects Klaipėda LNG FSRU with northern Lithuania.

== History ==
Project started in 2013, when Lithuanian parliament agreed to nationalise 550 private territories for project building. In 2014 construction works began.

On 2 October 2015 Klaipėda–Kuršėnai pipeline was officially opened for commission. Total cost of the construction was 63.7 million €.

In April 2022 President of Lithuania Gitanas Nausėda announced that Lithuanian national gas transmission operator Amber Grid and Lithuania has completely stopped purchasing the Russian gas and the transmission system has been operating without Russian gas imports since the beginning of April with no intention to receive the Russian gas in the future via Minsk–Kaliningrad Interconnection. Lithuania became the first EU country to end imports of Russian gas following the 2022 Russian invasion of Ukraine. As a result, Klaipėda–Kuršėnai pipeline and Klaipėda–Jurbarkas pipeline become main pipelines fulfilling Lithuania's gas demand via Klaipėda LNG FSRU.

== See also ==
- List of main natural gas pipelines in Lithuania
