= Daujėnai Eldership =

Eldership of Lithuania

The Daujėnai Eldership (Lithuanian: Daujėnų seniūnija) is an eldership of Lithuania, located in the Pasvalys District Municipality. In 2021 its population was 999.
