= Pušalotas Eldership =

Eldership of Lithuania

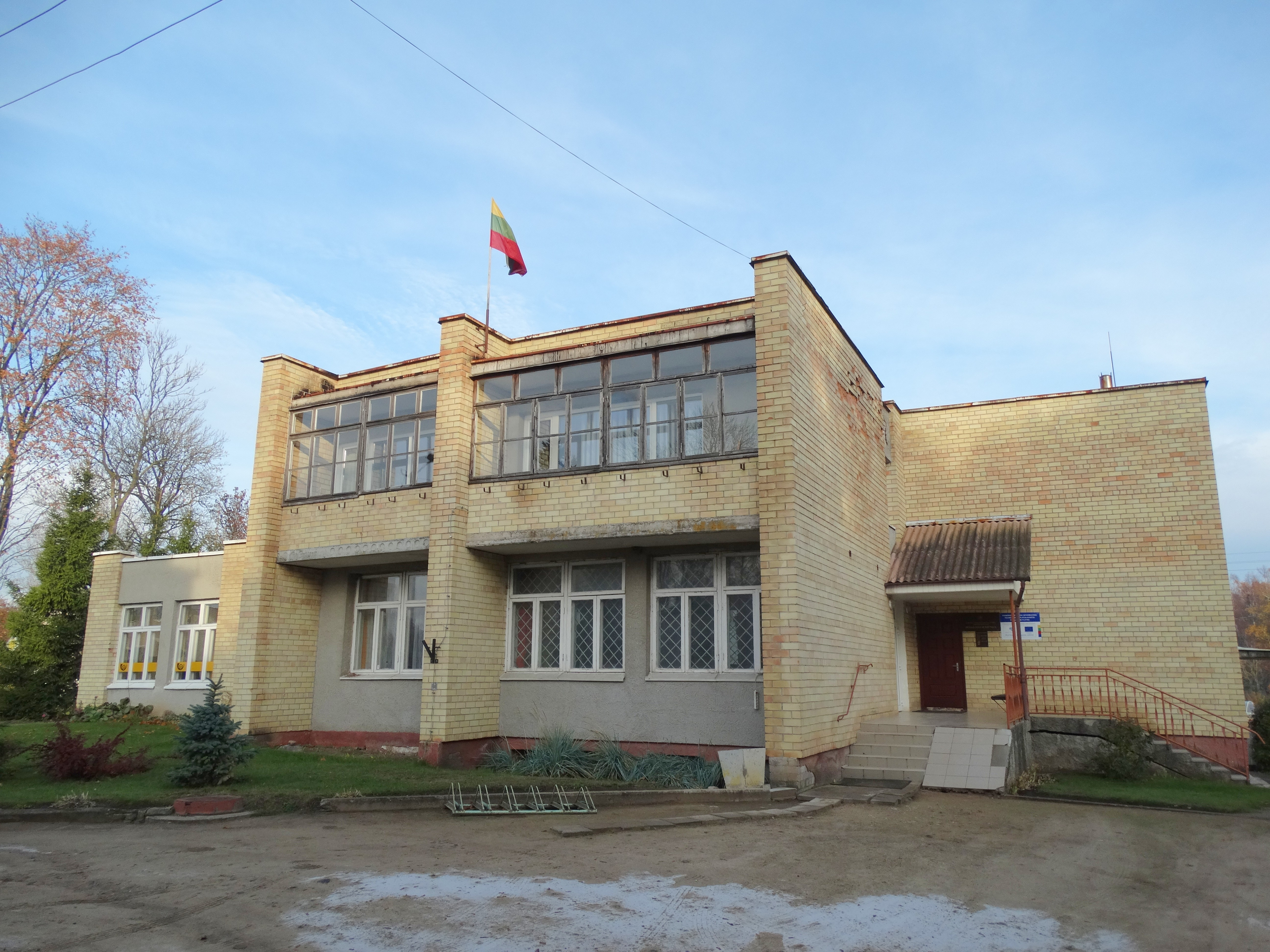
Pušalotas

The Pušalotas Eldership (Lithuanian: Pušaloto seniūnija) is an eldership of Lithuania, located in the Pasvalys District Municipality. In 2021 its population was 1348.
