= Poland–Lithuania (disambiguation) =

The Polish–Lithuanian Commonwealth was a bi-confederal state in Central and Eastern Europe from 1569 until 1795.

Poland–Lithuania may also refer to:

- Polish–Lithuanian union, from 1385 until 1569
- Lithuania–Poland border

== See also ==
- Lithuania–Poland relations
- LitPol Link, an electricity link between Poland and Lithuania
- Gas Interconnection Poland–Lithuania
- General Confederation of the Kingdom of Poland, an attempt to restore the political system of the Polish–Lithuanian Commonwealth between 1812 and 1813
