= Valakėliai =

- Village
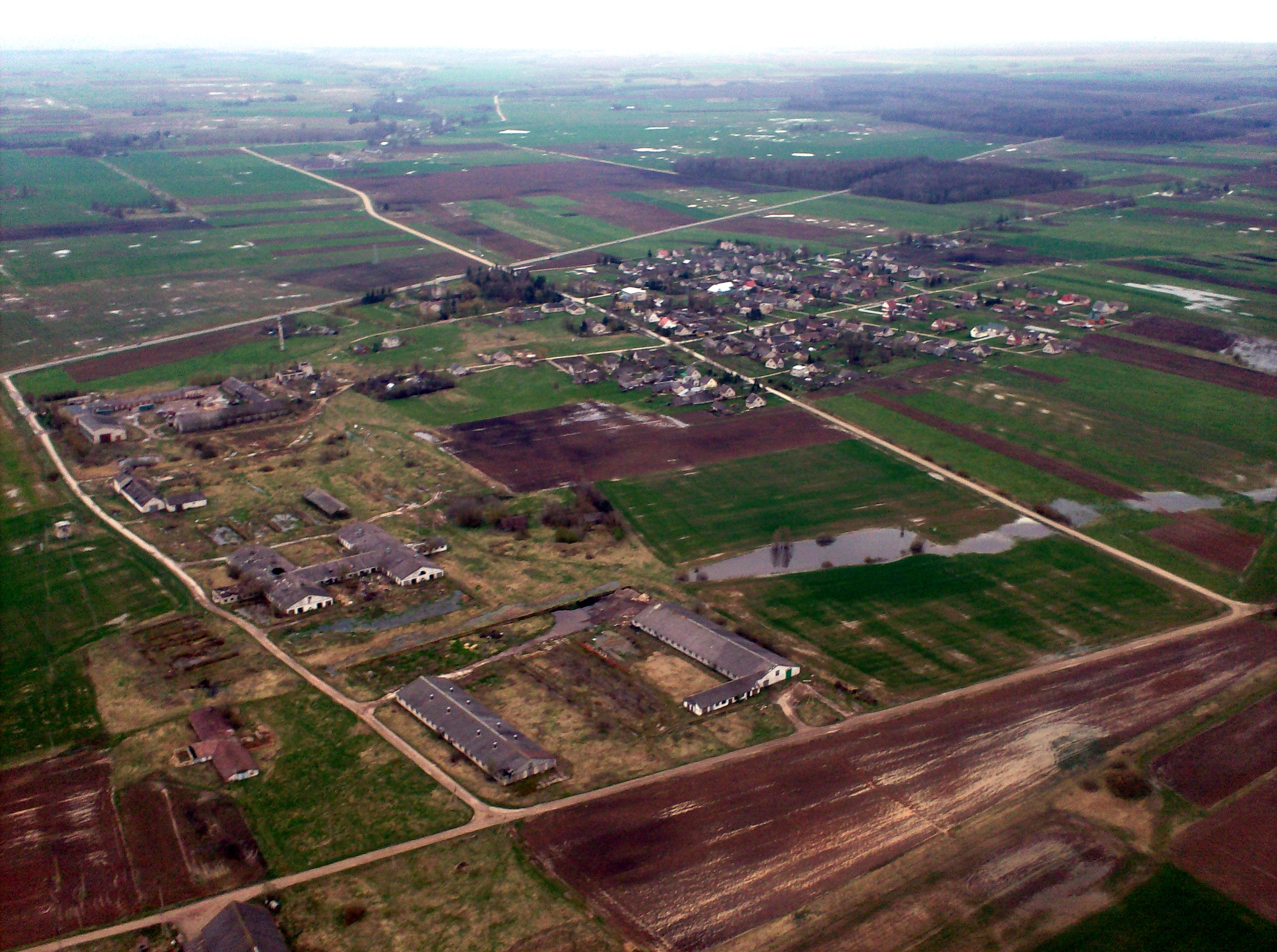

- Location within Lithuania
- Coordinates: 56°3′3.6″N 24°20′6″E
- Country: Lithuania
- County: Panevėžys County
- Municipality: Pasvalys District Municipality
- Eldership: Pasvalys Circuit eldership

Population (2021)
  - Total: 254
- Time zone: UTC+2 (EET)
  - Summer (DST): UTC+3 (EEST)

Valakėliai is a village in Panevėžys County, in northeastern Lithuania. According to the 2021 census, the village had a population of 254 inhabitants.

== History ==
In 1964, the Valakėliai Elementary School was opened.

On 13 January 2023, an explosion occurred at the Lithuania–Latvia Interconnection pipeline system by the nearby Pasvalio Vienkiemiai village. As a precaution, the entire village of Valakėliai was evacuated.

== Demography ==
Historical population

Year	Pop.	±% p.a.
1923	98	—
1959	57	−1.49%
1970	122	+7.16%
1979	228	+7.20%

Year	Pop.	±% p.a.
1989	330	+3.77%
2001	339	+0.22%
2011	320	−0.58%
2021	254	−2.28%

Source: 1902, 1923, 1959 & 1970, 1979, 1989, 2001, 20112021

== Transport ==
KK150 national road goes through the village with connections to Šiauliai, Pakruojis and Pasvalys.
