= Pasvalio Vienkiemiai =

- Village
- Location within Lithuania
- Coordinates: 56°3′21.6″N 24°22′15.6″E
- Country: Lithuania
- County: Panevėžys County
- Municipality: Pasvalys District Municipality
- Eldership: Pasvalys Rural Eldership

Population (2021)
  - Total: 27
- Time zone: UTC+2 (EET)
  - Summer (DST): UTC+3 (EEST)

Pasvalio Vienkiemiai is a village in Panevėžys County, in northeastern Lithuania. According to the 2021 census, the village had a population of 27 inhabitants.

== History ==
On 13 January 2023, an explosion occurred at the Lithuania–Latvia Interconnection pipeline system within the territory of the village. As a precaution, the entire nearby village of Valakėliai was evacuated.

== Demography ==
Historical population

| Year | Pop. | ±% p.a. |
|---|---|---|
| 1923 | 565 | — |
| 1959 | 343 | −1.38% |
| 1970 | 404 | +1.50% |
| 1979 | 339 | −1.93% |

| Year | Pop. | ±% p.a. |
|---|---|---|
| 1989 | 206 | −4.86% |
| 2001 | 224 | +0.70% |
| 2011 | 183 | −2.00% |
| 2021 | 27 | −17.42% |

Source: 1902, 1923, 1959 & 1970, 1979, 1989, 2001, 20112021

== Transport ==
KK150 national road goes through the village with connections to Šiauliai, Pakruojis and Pasvalys.
