= Pumpėnai Eldership =

Eldership of Lithuania

The Pumpėnai Eldership (Lithuanian: Pumpėnų seniūnija) is an eldership of Lithuania, located in the Pasvalys District Municipality. In 2021 its population was 1991.
