= Kiaulės Nugara =

Lithuanian island

Coordinates: 55°39′30″N 21°8′18″E

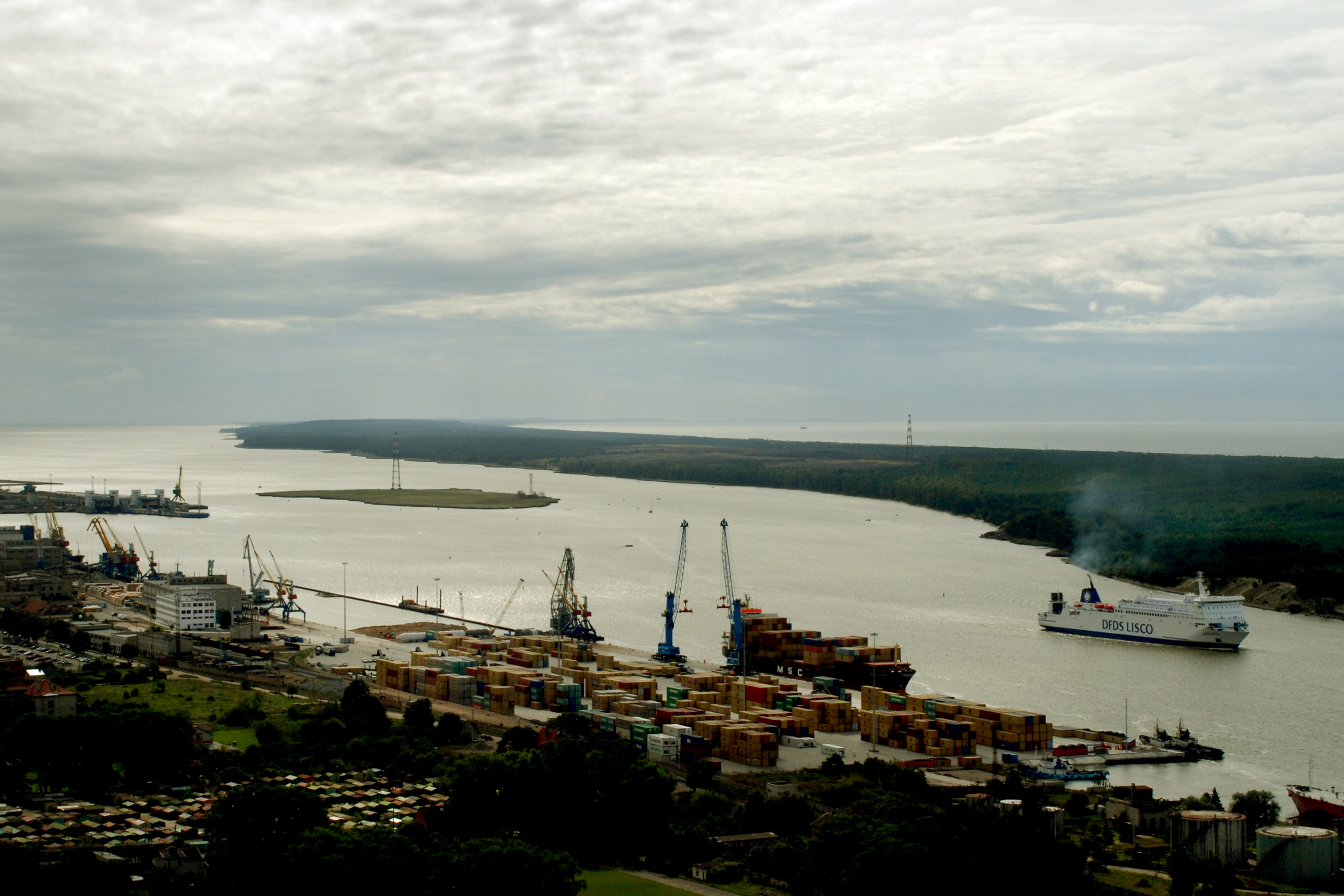
Kiaulės Nugara on the left

Kiaulės Nugara is an island in the Curonian Lagoon, Port of Klaipėda, Lithuania. The name of island means the back of a pig in the Lithuanian language.

One of the biggest islands of Lithuania, its length is around 800 meters and its width around 200–300 meters. The island is used for the electric power transmission station between Klaipėda and Curonian Spit. Sailing between the island and ferry terminal is not allowed, because of electric cables which hang at a height of only nine meters.

At the end of 2014, Klaipėda LNG FSRU planned to start working on the island.
