= Vaškai Eldership =

Eldership of Lithuania

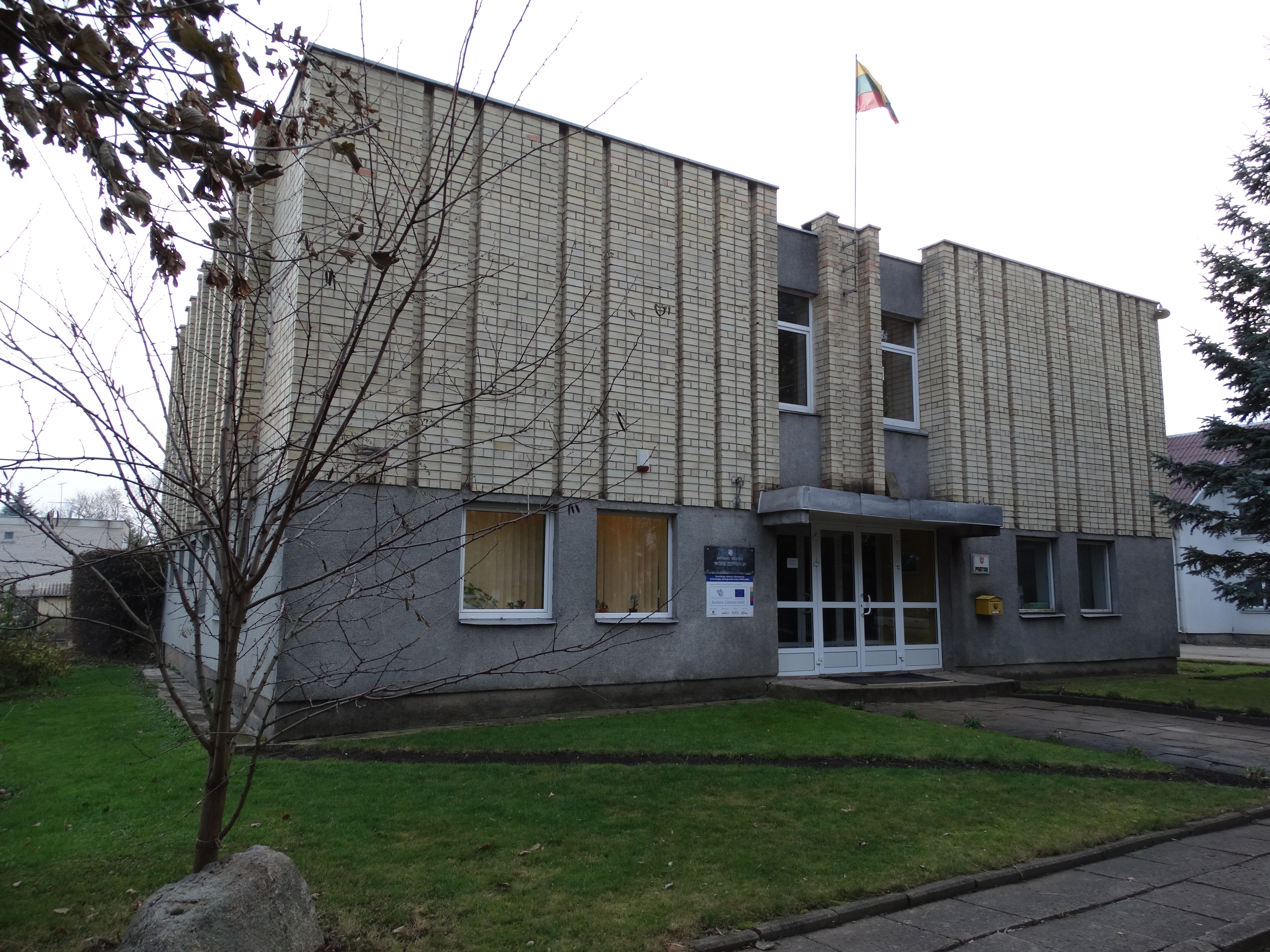
Vaškai Seniūnija in Lithuania

The Vaškai Eldership (Lithuanian: Vaškų seniūnija) is an eldership of Lithuania, located in the Pasvalys District Municipality. In 2021 its population was 1963.
