= Lithuania–Latvia Interconnection =

Natural gas pipeline

- Map of Lithuania–Latvia Interconnection

Location
- Country: Lithuania; Latvia
- Direction: south-north, north-south
- Start: Vilnius, Lithuania
- Passes through: Pasvalys, Lithuanian-Latvian border
- To: Riga, Latvia

General information
- Type: natural gas
- Partners: Amber Grid; Conexus Baltic Grid
- Construction started: 1962

Technical information
- Maximum discharge: 4.58 billion cubic metres per annum (162×10^{9} cu ft/a) (planned)
- Diameter: 500 mm (20 in)

Lithuania–Latvia Interconnection (Lithuanian: Lietuvos-Latvijos dujotiekis, Latvian: Lietuvas–Latvijas gāzes vada starpsavienojums) is a natural gas pipeline which connects Lithuania and Latvia.

== History ==
Gas pipeline from Lithuanian border to Iecava with the diameter of 500 mm was built in 1962. It is the oldest pipeline in Latvia. In 2013 construction works for enhancement of capacity of interconnection was finished. New discharge capacity will allow transmissions of 6.48 million cubic metres per day from Lithuania to Latvia and 6.24 million cubic metres per day from Latvia to Lithuania. The pipeline is linked with Estonia–Latvia Interconnection.

=== Enhancement ===
ELLI (Enhancement of Latvia-Lithuania interconnection) was included into the third PCI List adopted by the European Commission on 24 November 2017, in the Baltic Energy Market Interconnection Plan Gas priority corridor. After completion, transmission of natural gas capacity between two countries will roughly double.

The expansion is set to start operating in 2022–2023.

=== Explosion ===
On 13 January 2023 an explosion happened in part of the pipeline by Pasvalio Vienkiemiai village, Pasvalys District Municipality. Open fire reached up to 50 m in height. As a precaution the entire village of Valakėliai was evacuated. As a result Lithuania stopped natural gas transit to Latvia.

On 16 January 2023, the repairs were fully finished and gas supply to Latvia restored at full capacity. After the repairs Lithuania were exporting up to 90 GWh per day of natural gas to Latvia via the pipeline.

== See also ==
- Gas Interconnection Poland–Lithuania
- List of main natural gas pipelines in Lithuania
