= Saločiai Eldership =

Eldership of Lithuania

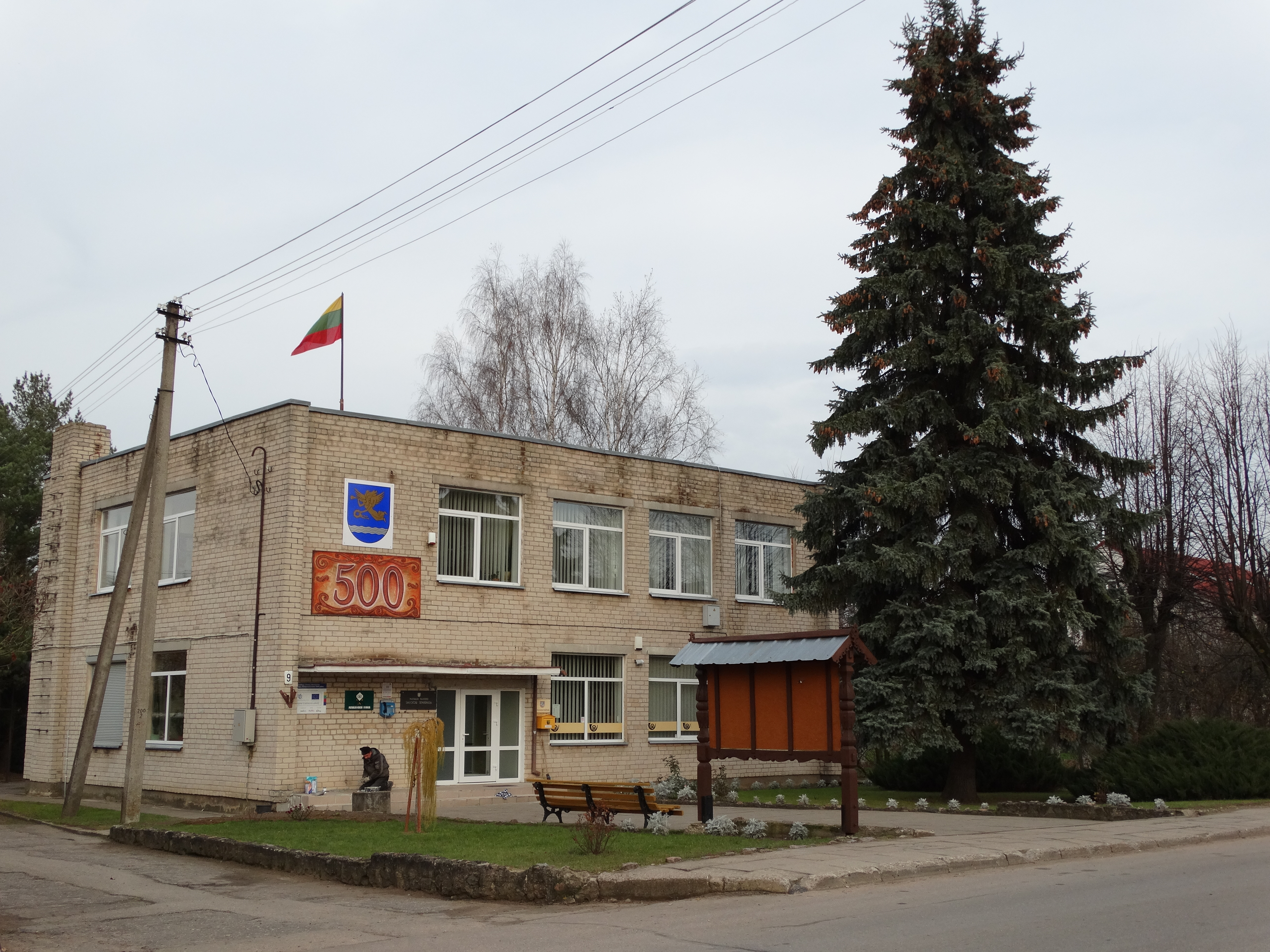
Eldership in 2014

The Saločiai Eldership (Lithuanian: Saločių seniūnija) is an eldership of Lithuania, located in the Pasvalys District Municipality. In 2021 its population was 2181.
