= Krinčinis Eldership =

Eldership of Lithuania

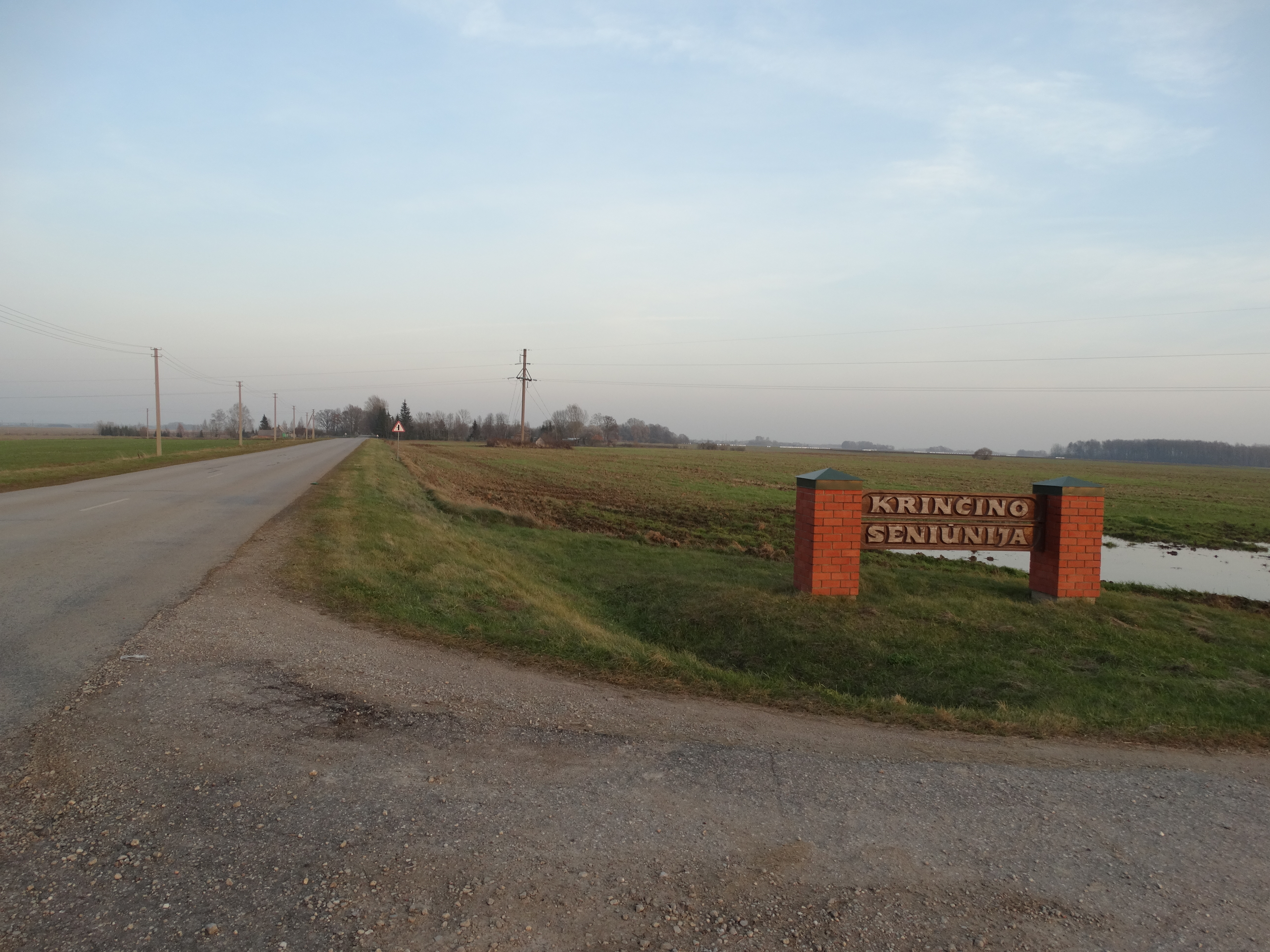
Krinčino Seniūnija, Pasvalys District, Lithuania

The Krinčinis Eldership (Lithuanian: Krinčino seniūnija) is an eldership of Lithuania, located in the Pasvalys District Municipality. In 2021 its population was 1591.
