= Jauniūnai natural gas compression station =

Gas compressor station in Lithuania

Coordinates: 54°57′44″N 24°59′52″E

Jauniūnai natural gas compression station is a gas compressor station in Lithuania, located in Jauniūnai, Širvintos District Municipality. Capacity at the station is 34.5 MW.

The station will be the end point of the planned Gas Interconnection Poland–Lithuania.

== History ==
Due to increasing natural gas consumption in Lithuania the existing gas compression station was not sufficient to service demand. In 2007 the Lithuanian National Energy Strategy Act was adopted with a new natural gas compression station project included. Jauniūnai was selected due mainly to its location along the Minsk-Vilnius pipeline, the Vilnius-Kaunas-Kaliningrad pipeline and two threads of the Vilnius-Panevėžys-Riga pipeline.

In 2009 construction works started and were finished in 2010. The cost of construction was estimated at 200 million litas.
