= Panevėžys natural gas compression station =

Natural gas compression station in Panevezys, Lithuania

Coordinates: 55°47′12″N 24°22′48″E

Panevėžys natural gas compression station is the older of two operating gas compressor stations in Lithuania, located in the City of Panevėžys. The operator is AB Amber Grid. The capacity of the station is 7.7 MW.

== History ==
Panevėžys natural gas compression station started operations in 1974.

== Directions and use ==
Panevėžys NGCS was adapted to work in 3 directions:

- West Way - (Lithuania) Klaipėda
- North Way - (Latvia) Riga
- South Way - (Lithuania) Vilnius

Currently it is mostly used for Klaipėda direction. The station can be adapted for reverse flow operation.
