= Port of Klaipėda =

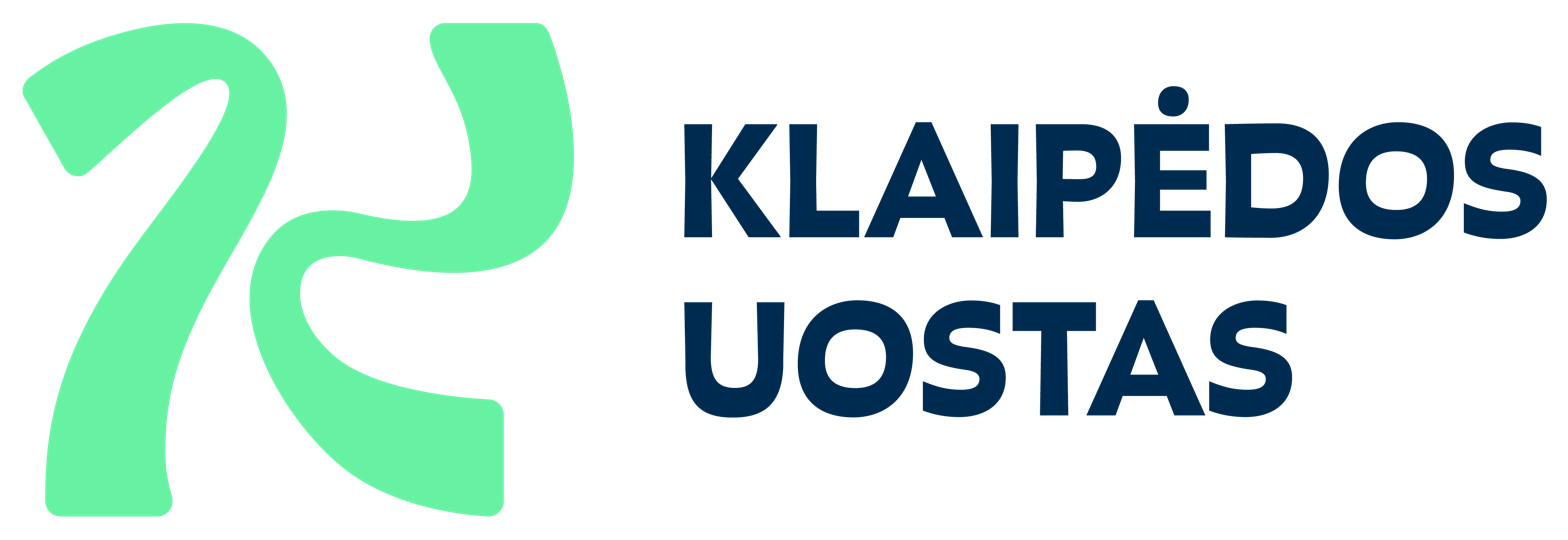

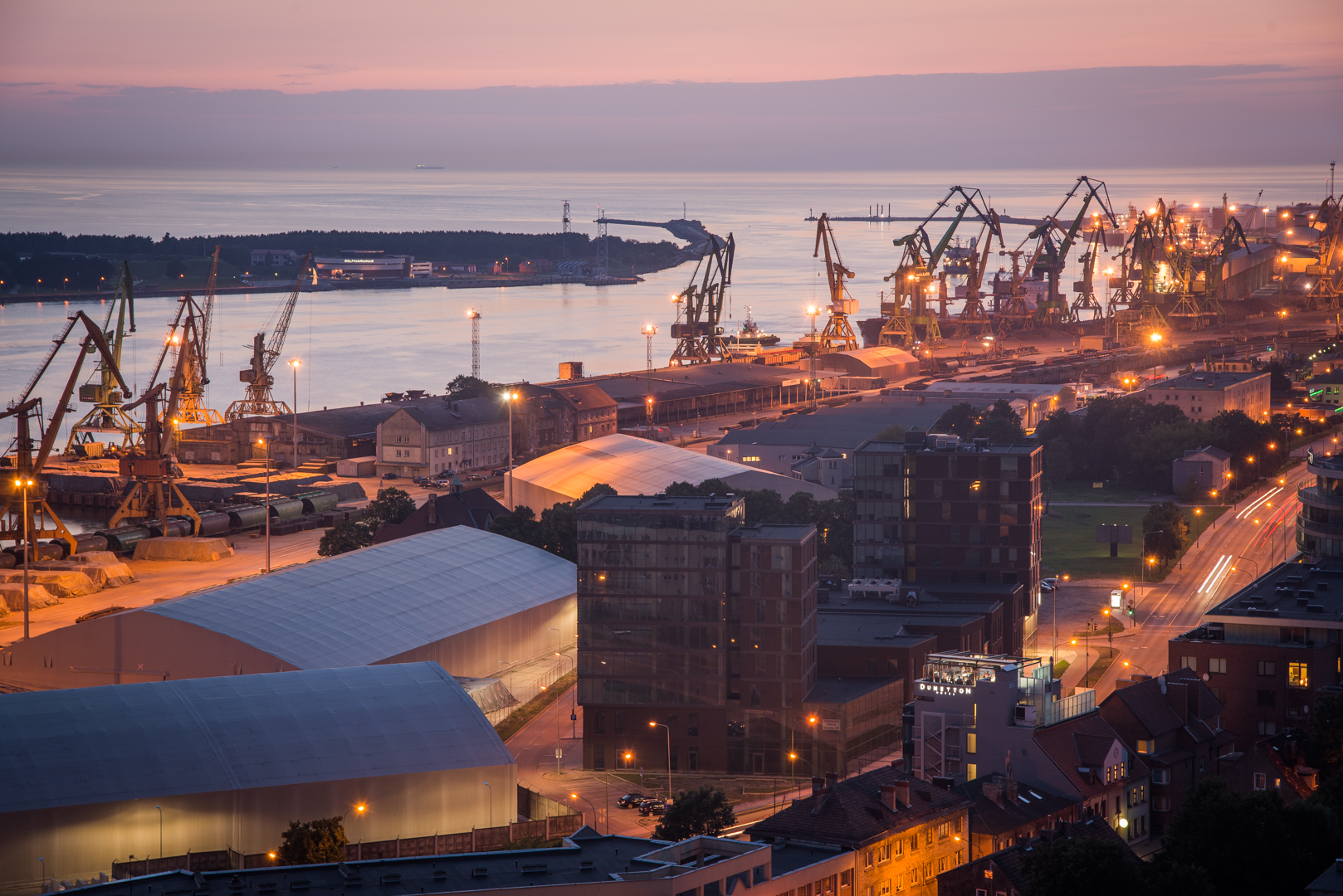
- Interactive map of Port of Klaipėda
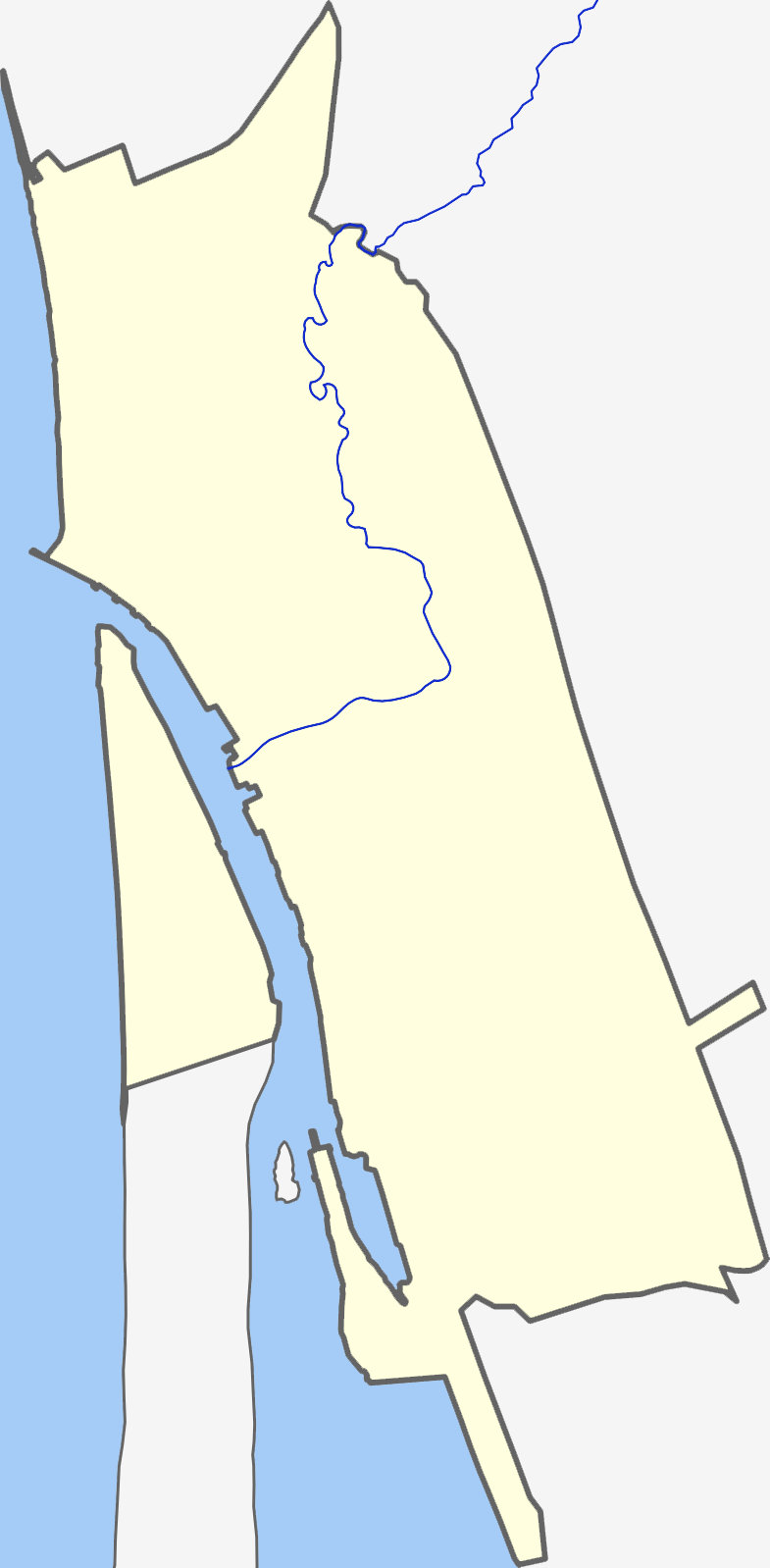
- Location in Klaipėda

Location
- Country: Lithuania
- Location: Klaipėda, Lithuania
- Coordinates: 55.717778°N 21.1125°E
- UN/LOCODE: LTKLJ

Details
- Opened: 1252
- Owned by: Government of Lithuania
- Chief Executive Officer: Algis Latakas

Statistics
- Vessel arrivals: 5 314 (2025)
- Annual cargo tonnage: 39 million (2025)
- Annual container volume: 1 309 000 TEU (2025)
- Passenger traffic: 76 620 (2025)
- Website portofklaipeda.lt

The Port of Klaipėda (Lithuanian: Klaipėdos uostas) is a seaport located in Klaipėda, Lithuania. It is one of the few ice-free ports in northernmost Europe. It serves as a port of call for cruise ships as well as freight transport. Regular cargo and passenger ferry lines connect to German and Swedish ports Kiel, Travemünde, Rostock, Karlshamn and Trelleborg.

Main deepsea container lines operating in Klaipėda port are: Maersk, MSC, CMA-CGM, Happag-Lloyd, One, Evergreen, OOCL, Cosco.

Shortsea carriers operating in Klaipėda port: Unifeeder, ViaSea, X-press.

== History ==
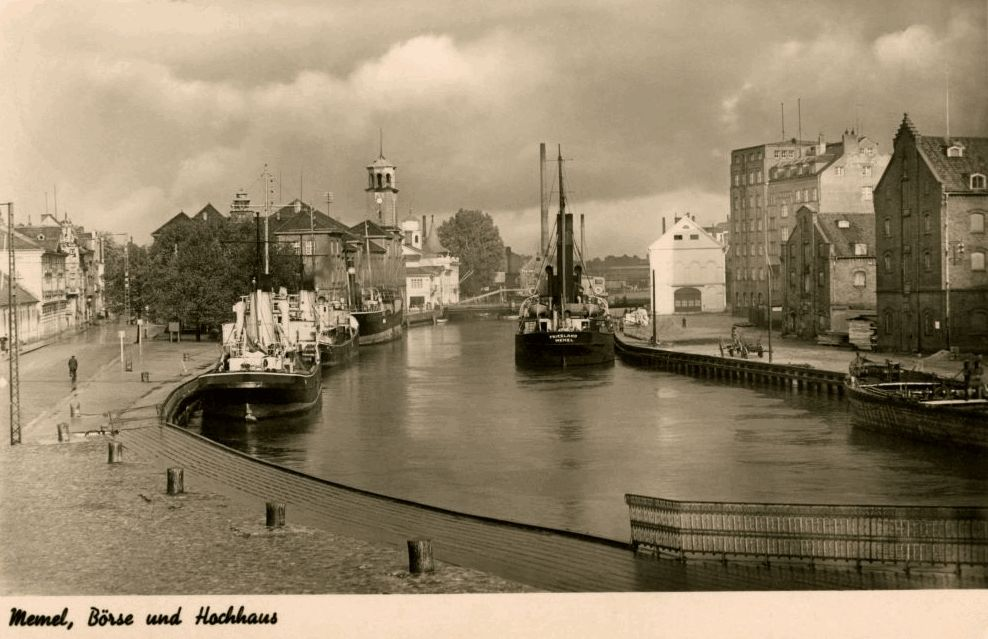
The old port of Klaipėda in early 20th century

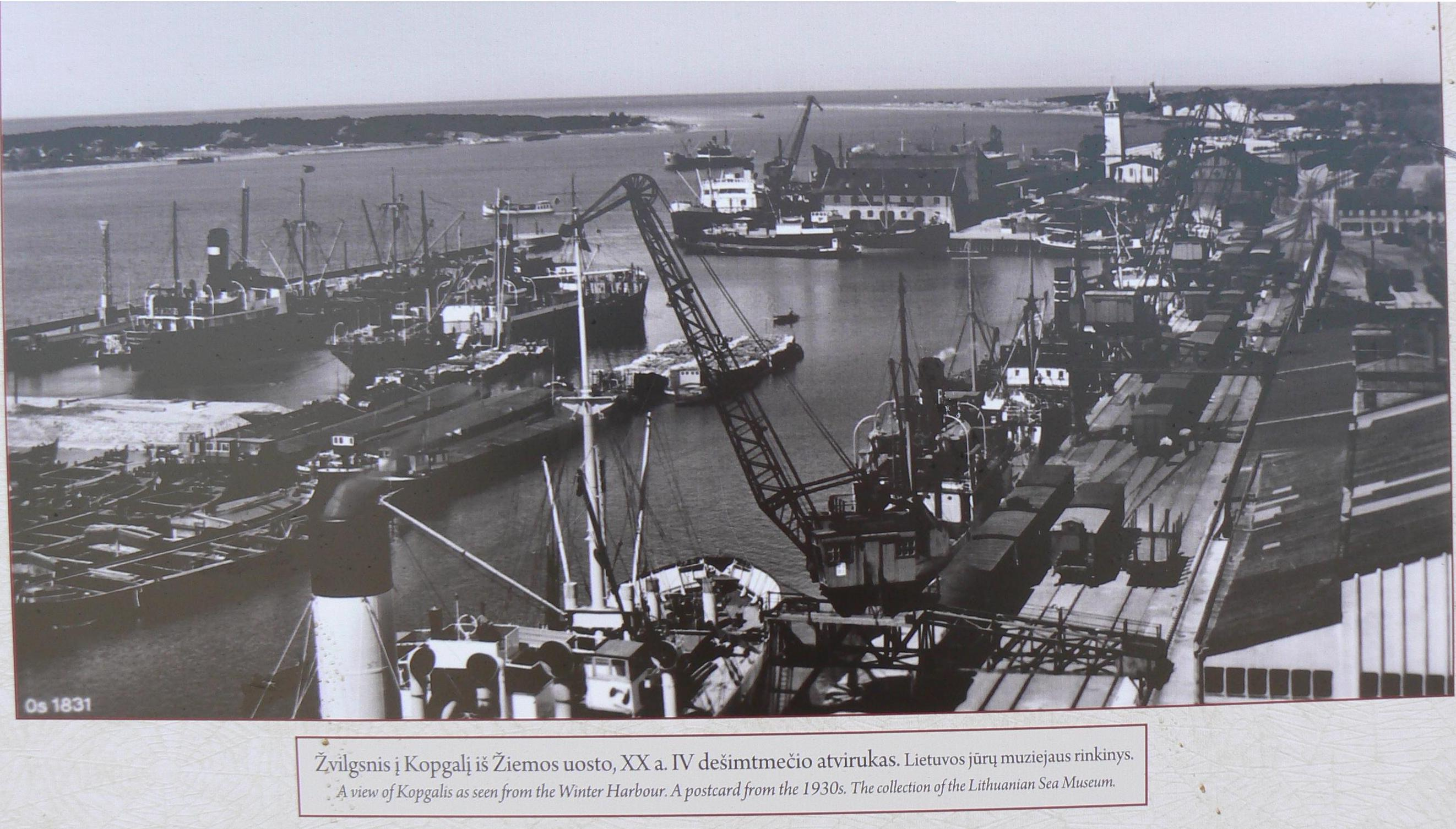
Winter Harbour, Kopagalis district of Klaipėda, 1930s

The city of Klaipėda (Memel) has been involved in maritime trade as early as the 13th century, and probably during prehistoric times, since it is located on the Amber Road. For several centuries its administration as well as its merchants defended the port and it was heavily fortified. In the Grand Duchy of Lithuania, most of the trade was handled via the Port of Danzig, Port of Königsberg and Port of Riga. Therefore, Klaipėda emerged as a major trading port only in recent centuries. At the beginning of the 20th century the port was transferred to the jurisdiction of the Ministry of Transport of Lithuania. Before World War I, the major cargo was timber. During the 20th century, mineral and cellulose enterprises were established in Lithuania, and became port commodities. Infrastructure supporting the fishing and shipbuilding industries were also built.

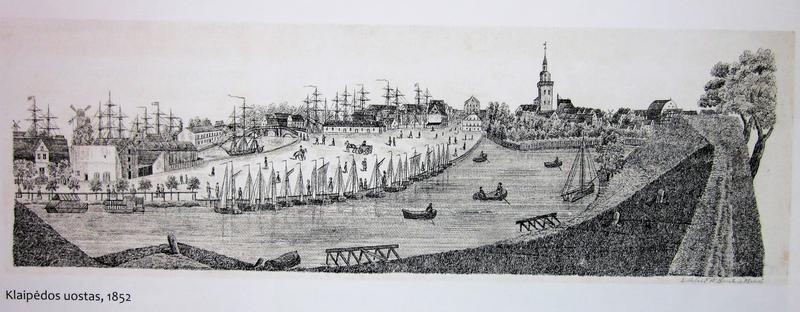
Port in 1852

== Current operations ==
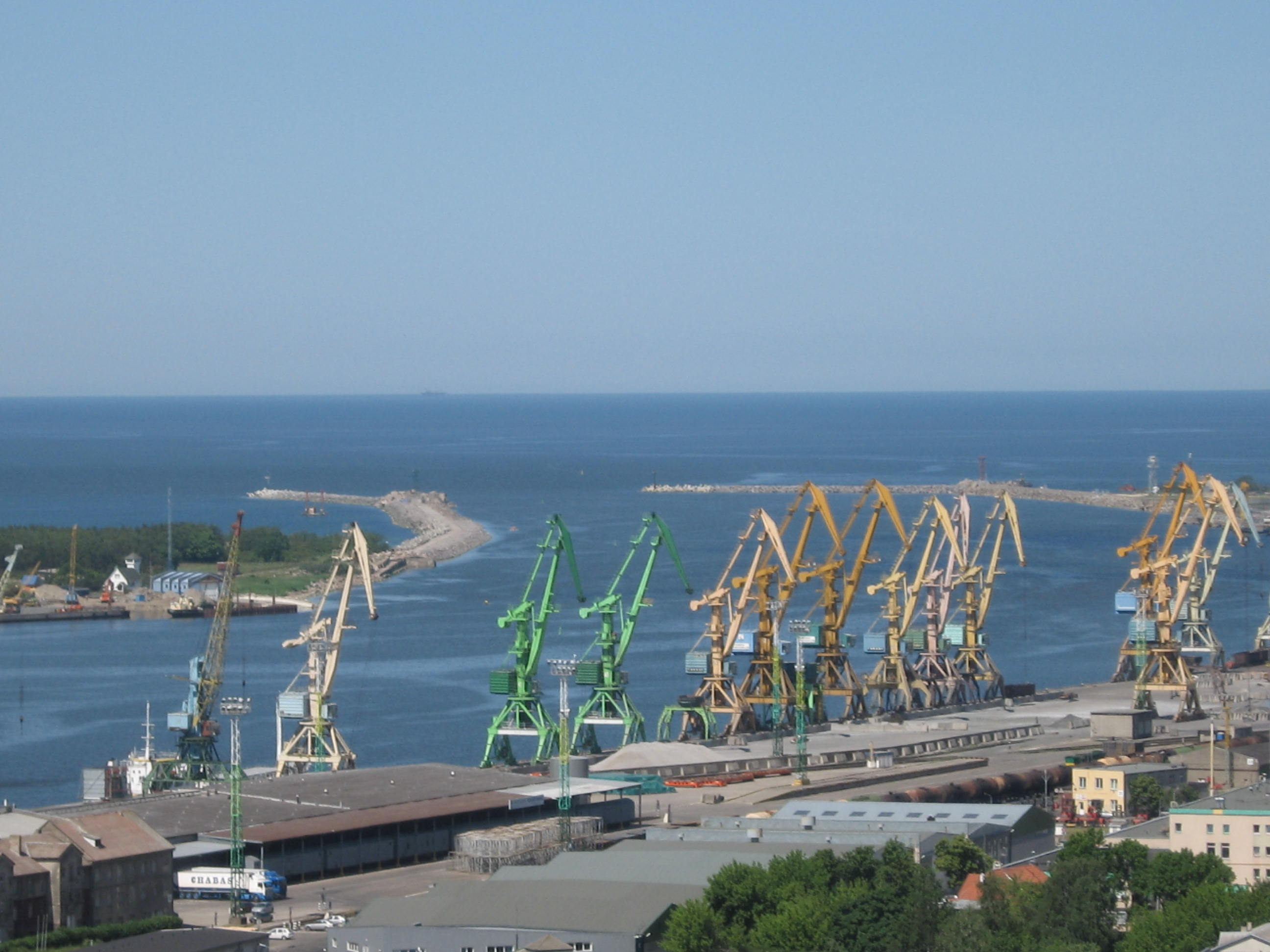
The port of Klaipėda handled more than 46 million tons of cargo in 2018

Klaipėda State Seaport Authority (Lithuanian: Klaipėdos valstybinio jūrų uosto direkcija) was established in 1991, soon after the restoration of Lithuania's independence. It administers the port and supports its integration into the larger scheme of Lithuanian transport. The Port Authority is responsible for the maintenance, reconstruction and modernisation of the port infrastructure, while loading and unloading operations are managed by separate independent terminals. The port's land and infrastructure belong to the state, but some privatisization is underway.

The Port of Klaipėda is the most northerly ice-free port in the Eastern part of the Baltic Sea. The port can accommodate ships of up to 400 meters in length with draughts of up to 14.3 meters. The port is served by two railway stations and a highways which together link Klaipėda to Kaunas, Vilnius and cities in the nearby countries, such as Minsk, Kyiv and Moscow.

In 1997, 16.13 million tons of cargo were handled at the port, increasing to over 31 million tons in 2010. About 321,000 international passengers transhipped the port of Klaipėda in 2010, on ferries servicing Kiel and Mukran in Germany, Åhus in Sweden, and Copenhagen and Fredericia in Denmark.

In 2015, the Port Authority hired Austrian company Strabag for dredging the shipping channel to the depth of 15 metres.

In 2023, the shipping channel was deepened to 15.5 metres.

In August 2023, it was announced that ~115 million euros will be invested in the infrastructure of offshore wind power plants in the port of Klaipėda.

2023, like 2022, was a successful year for the port in terms of container handling. Annual load exceeded 1 million teu.

On 5 June 2026 Port of Klaipėda opened Lithuania's first green hydrogen production and supply station. Facility uses a 2.25 MW polymer electrolyte membrane (PEM) electrolyser and is projected to produce approximately 127 tonnes of hydrogen annually at full capacity. The hydrogen is intended to fuel passenger cars and heavy-duty transport, as well as a hydrogen-powered waste-collection vessel and a Toyota Mirai operated by the port authority.

Some of the major companies or objects operating in the port:

- BLRT Western Shipyard
- DFDS Seaways
- Limarko laivininkystės kompanija
- Klaipėda LNG FSRU
- Klaipėdos jūrų krovinių kompanija (KLASCO)
- Klaipėdos Smeltė AB
- Klaipėdos Nafta

Annual cargo turnover, million tonnes
2000	2001	2002	2003	2004	2005	2006	2007	2008	2009
19.40	17.24	19.74	21.19	20.25	21.79	23.61	27.36	29.88	27.86
2010	2011	2012	2013	2014	2015	2016	2017	2018	2019
31.28	36.59	35.24	33.42	36.41	38.51	40.14	43.17	46.58	46.22
2020	2021	2022	2023						
47.79	45.62	36.12	32.7						

== Gallery ==
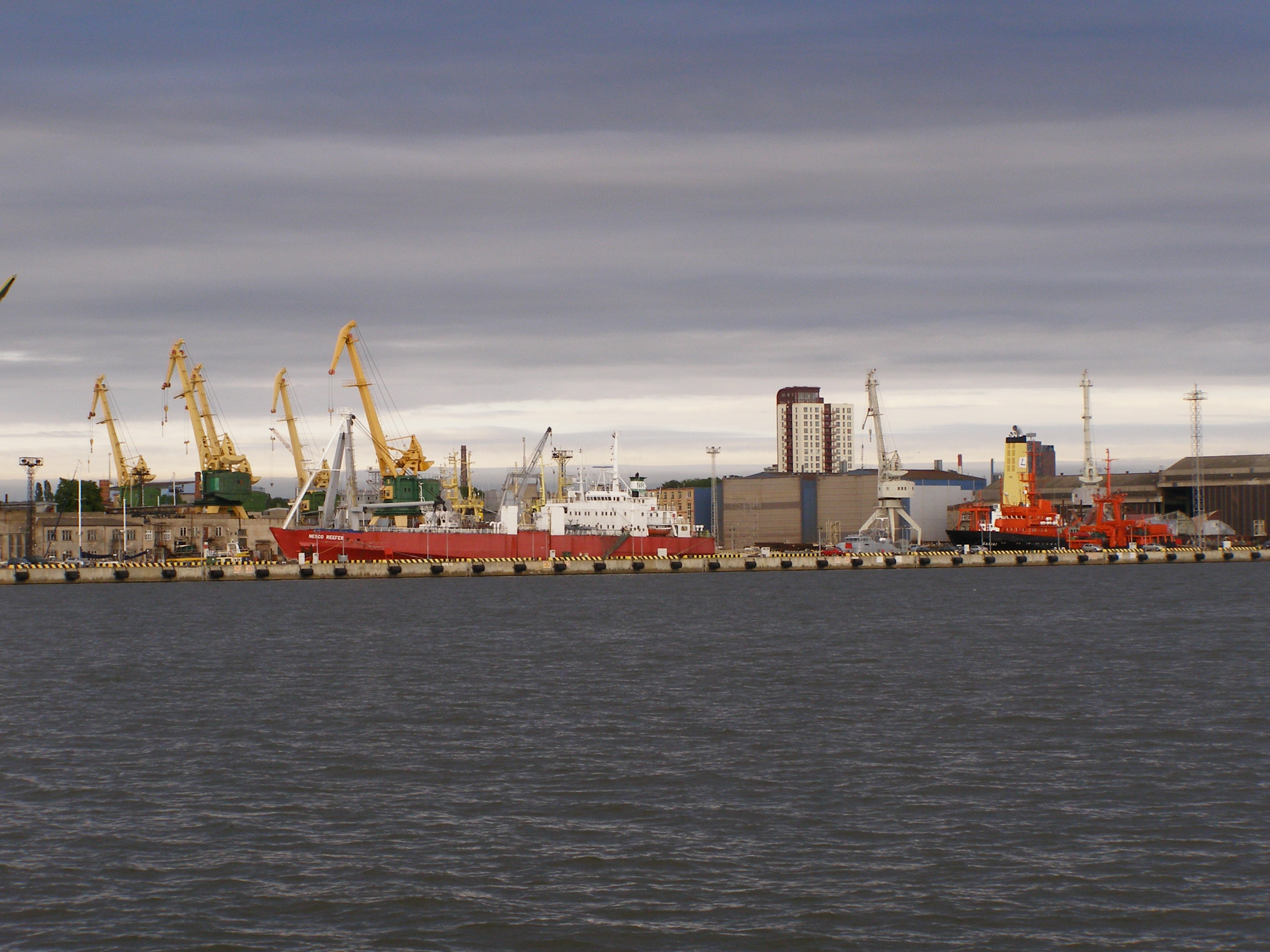
Ships in the port

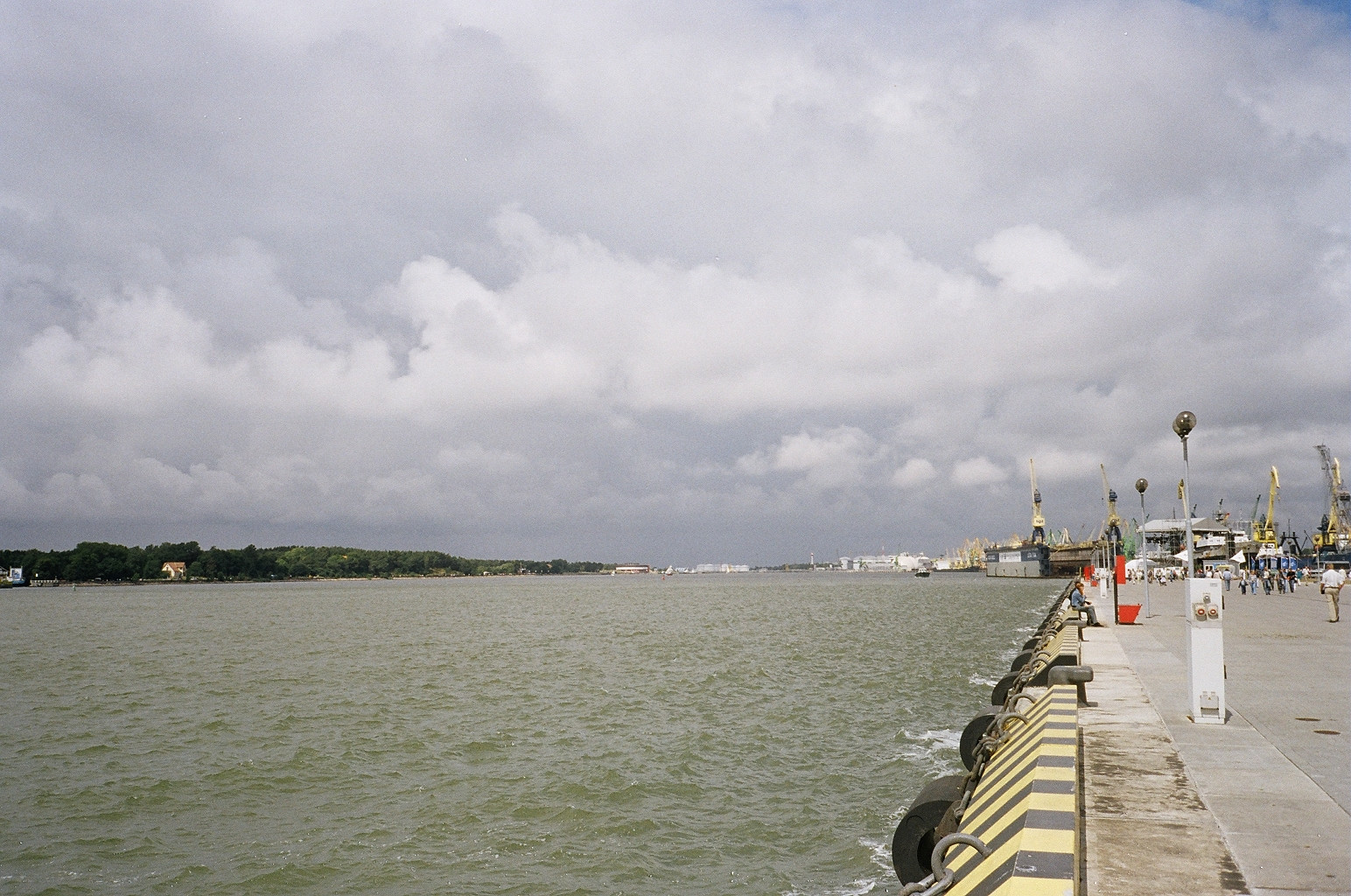
Embankment of the cruise ship terminal

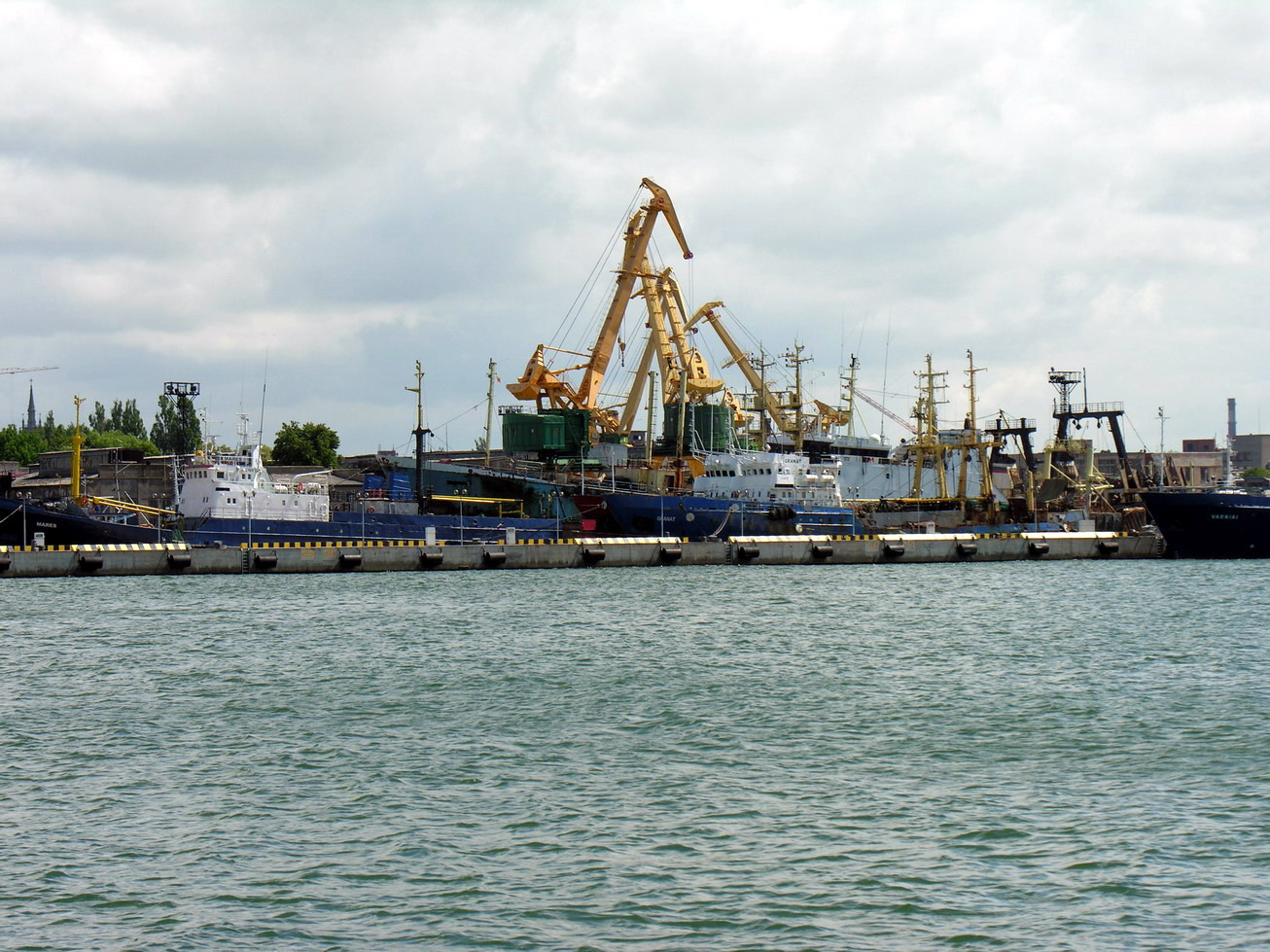
Cargo loading

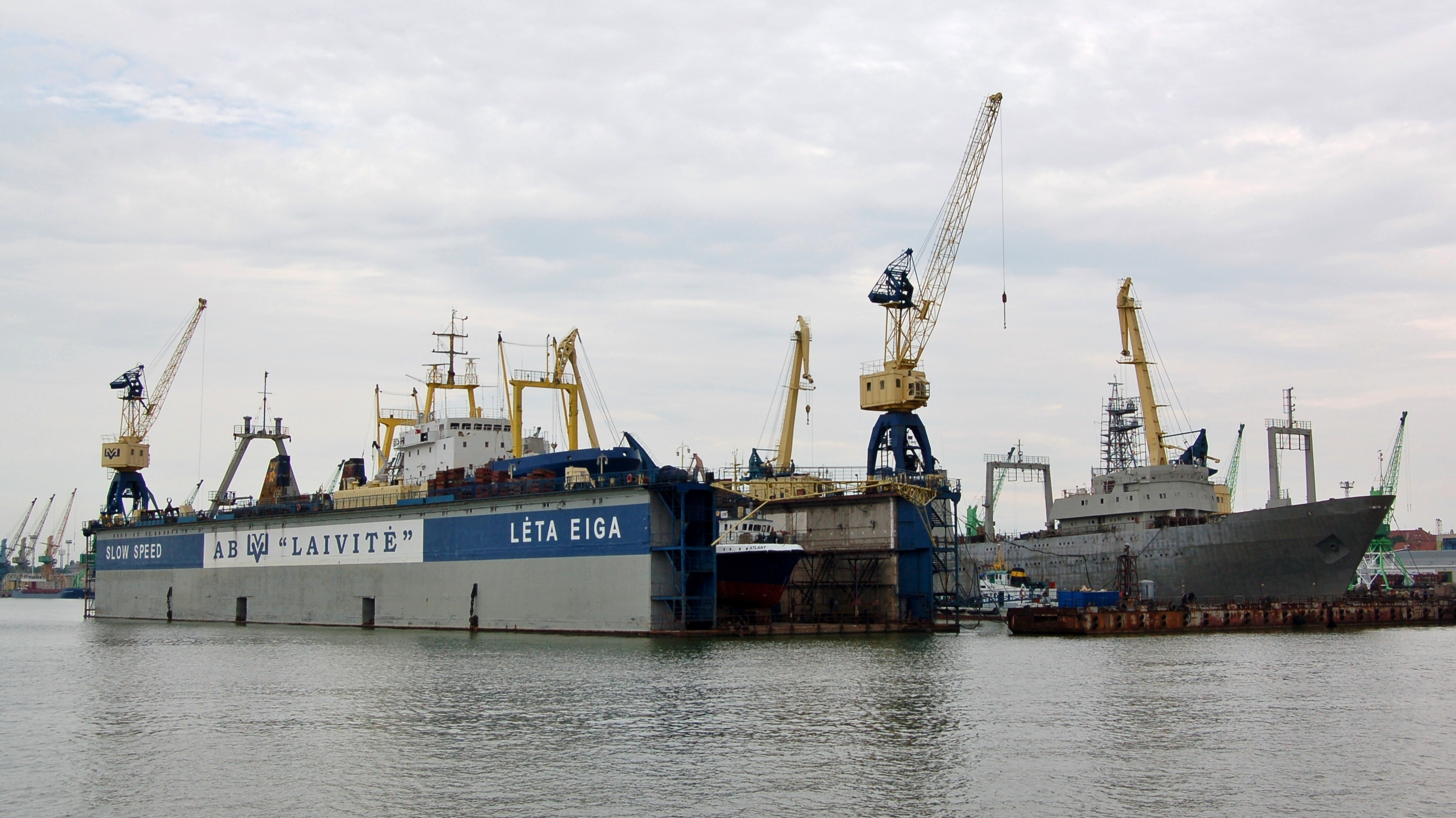
Harbour

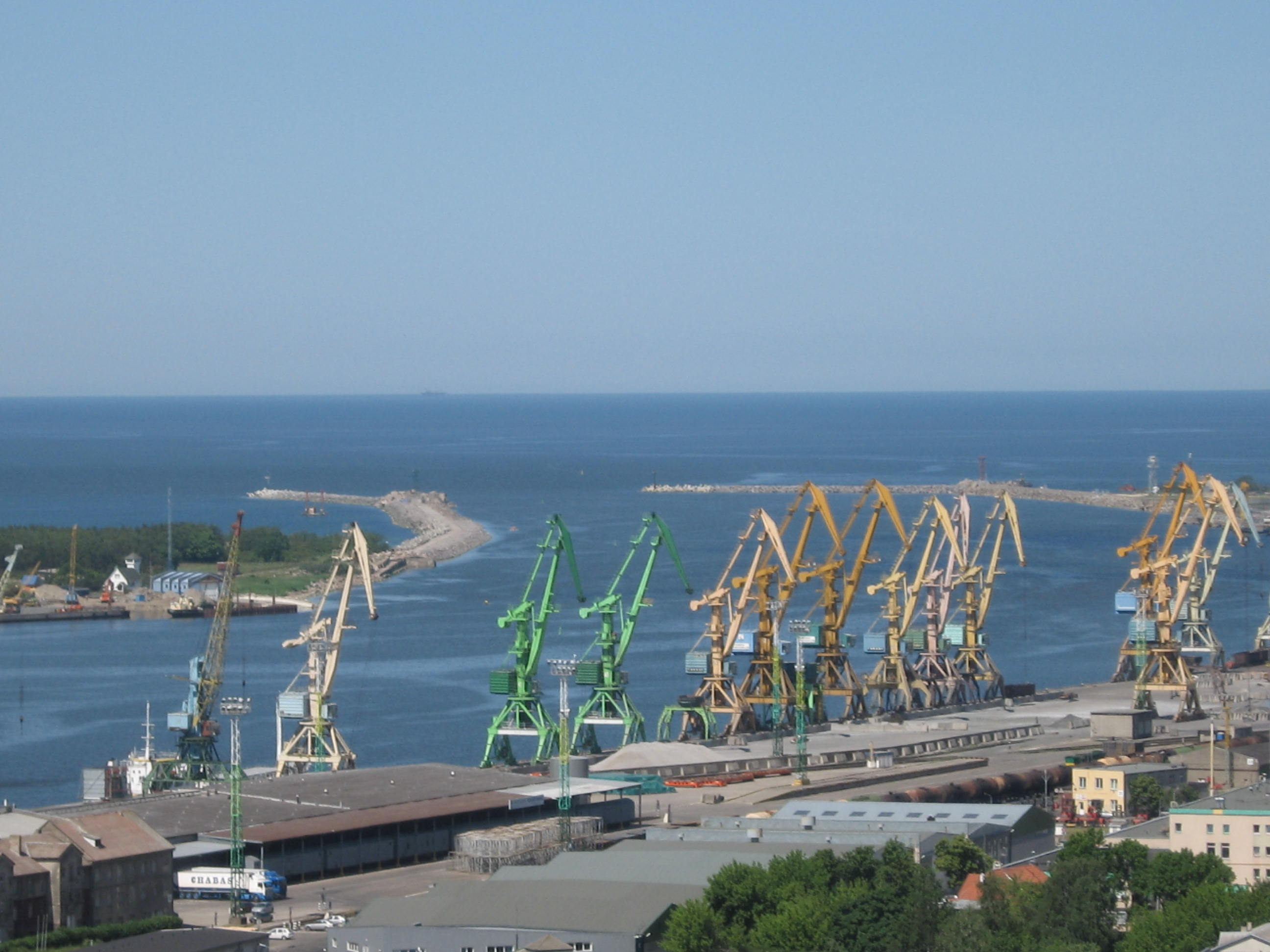
Sea gate

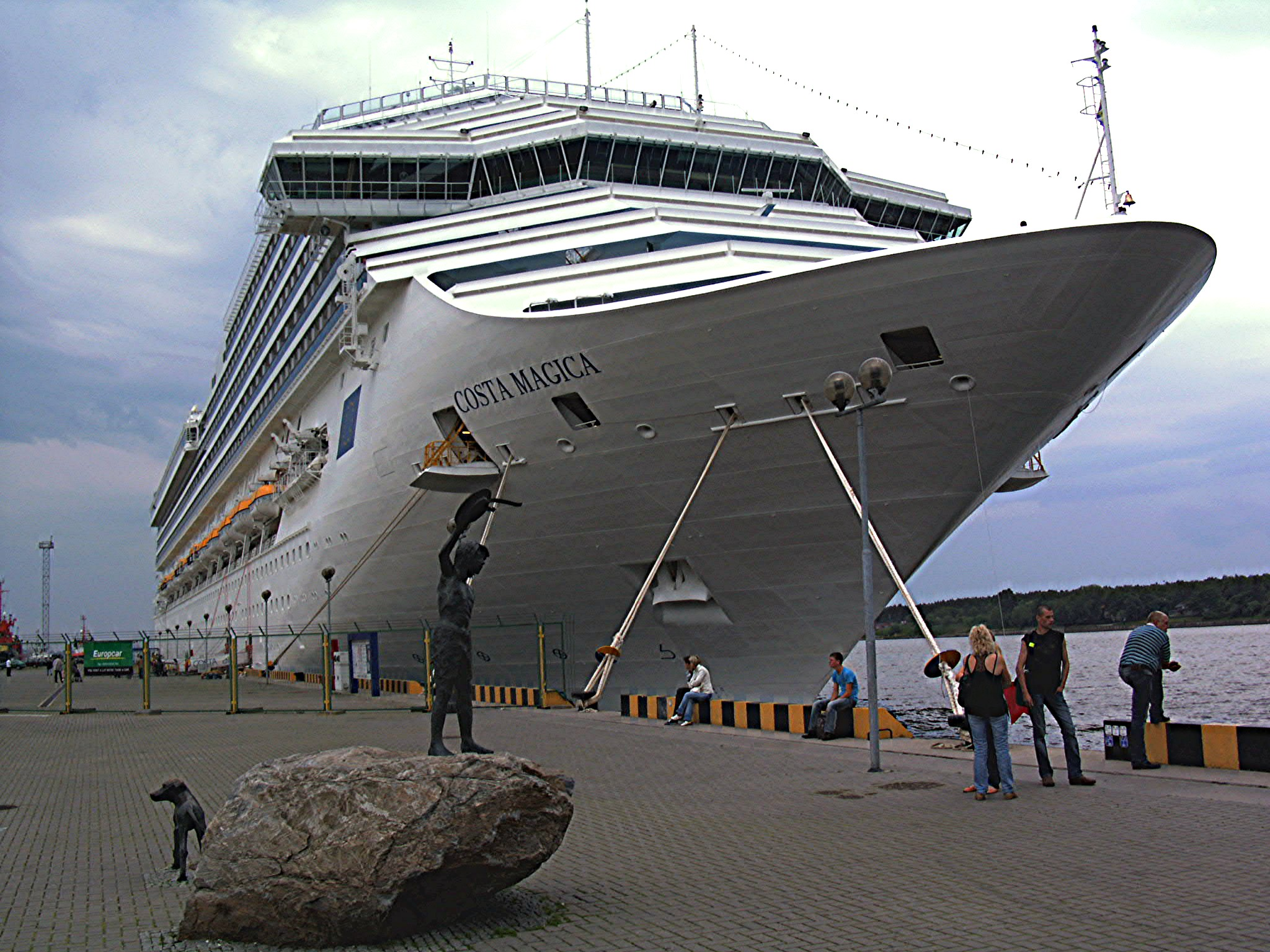
Cruise ship Costa Magica visiting the port

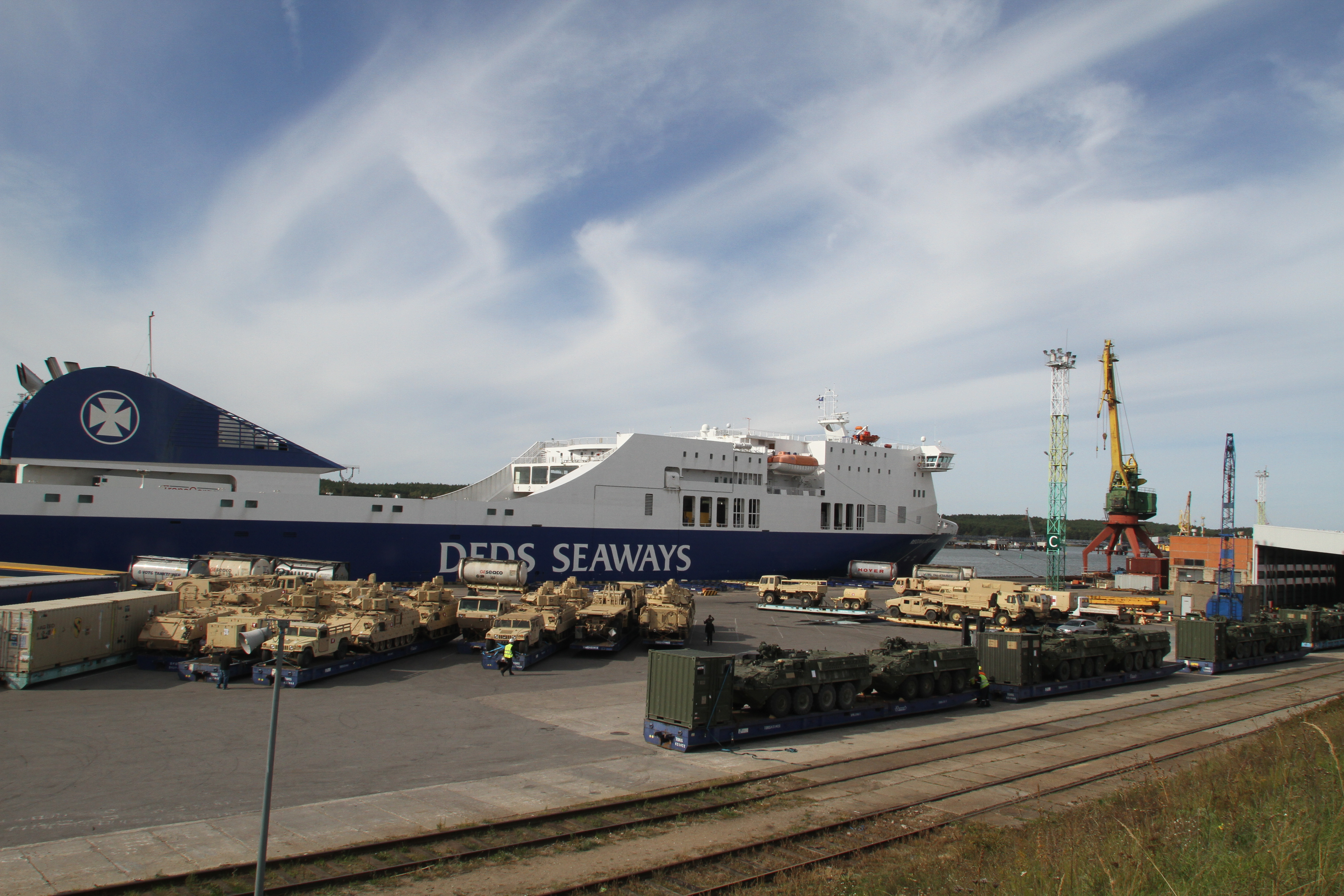
US military equipment transferred as part of Operation Atlantic Resolve

== See also ==
- History of Klaipėda
- Ports of the Baltic Sea
