= Klaipėda LNG terminal =

LNG terminal in Lithuania

Coordinates: 55.664457°N 21.137649°E

Klaipėda liquefied natural gas floating storage and regasification unit terminal
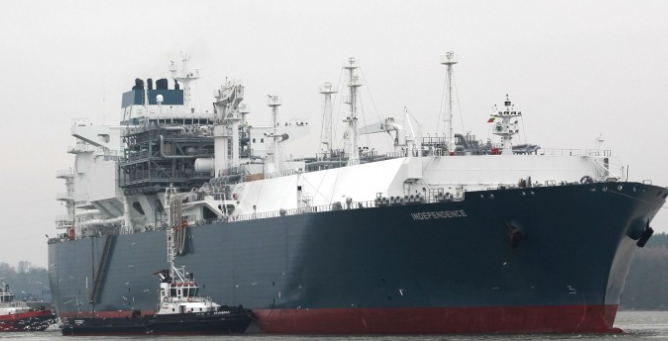
- Main vessel of the terminal
- Interactive map of Klaipėda liquefied natural gas floating storage and regasification unit terminal

Location
- Country: Lithuania
- Location: Kiaulės Nugara, Klaipėda

Details
- Opened: 2014
- Owned by: KN Energies
- Type of Harbor: liquified natural gas terminal
- No. of berths: 1 (Platform for LNG tankers)

Statistics
- Website knenergies.lt/en/

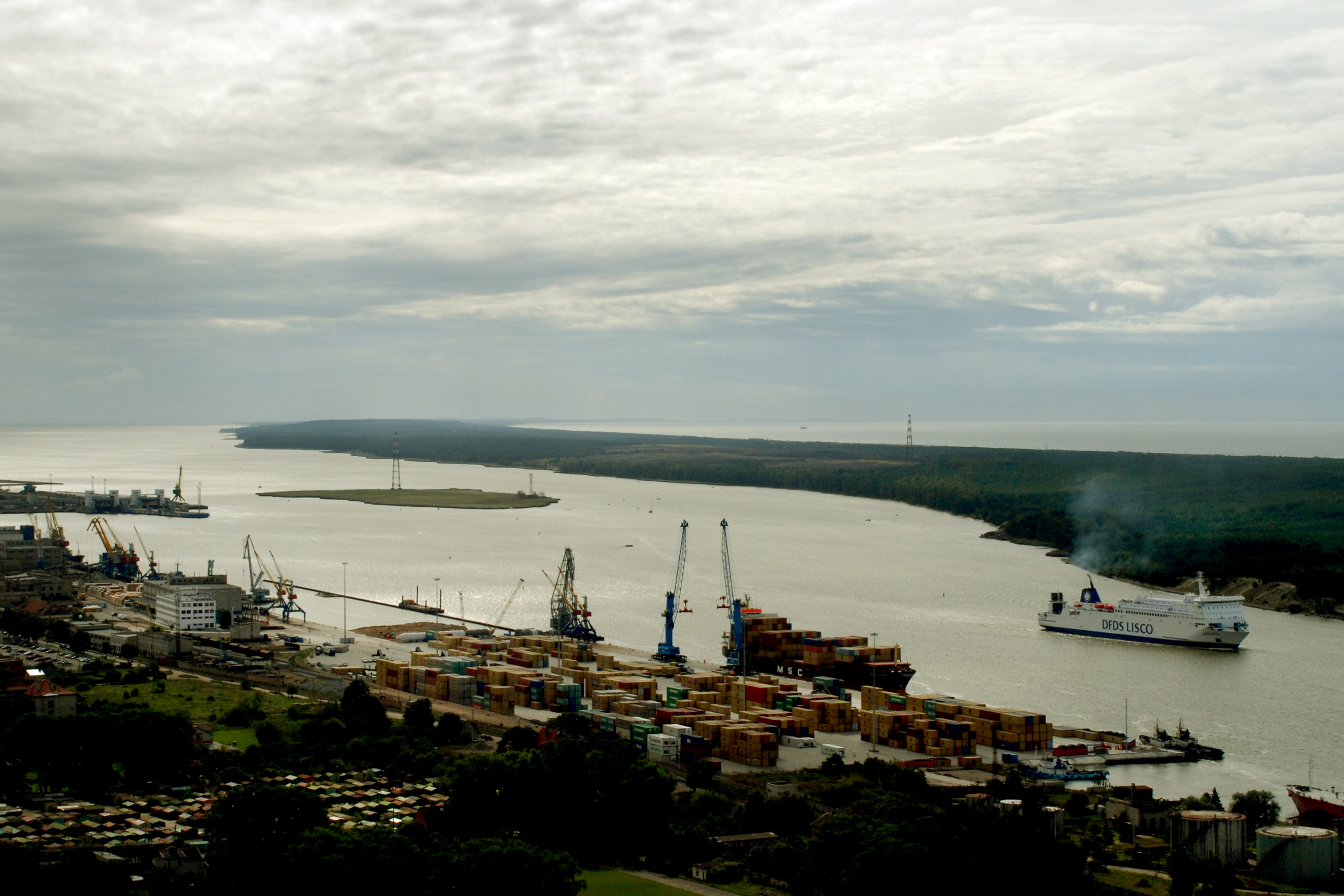
Terminal was built in island of Kiaulės Nugara (left center) in Klaipėda port (old pic).

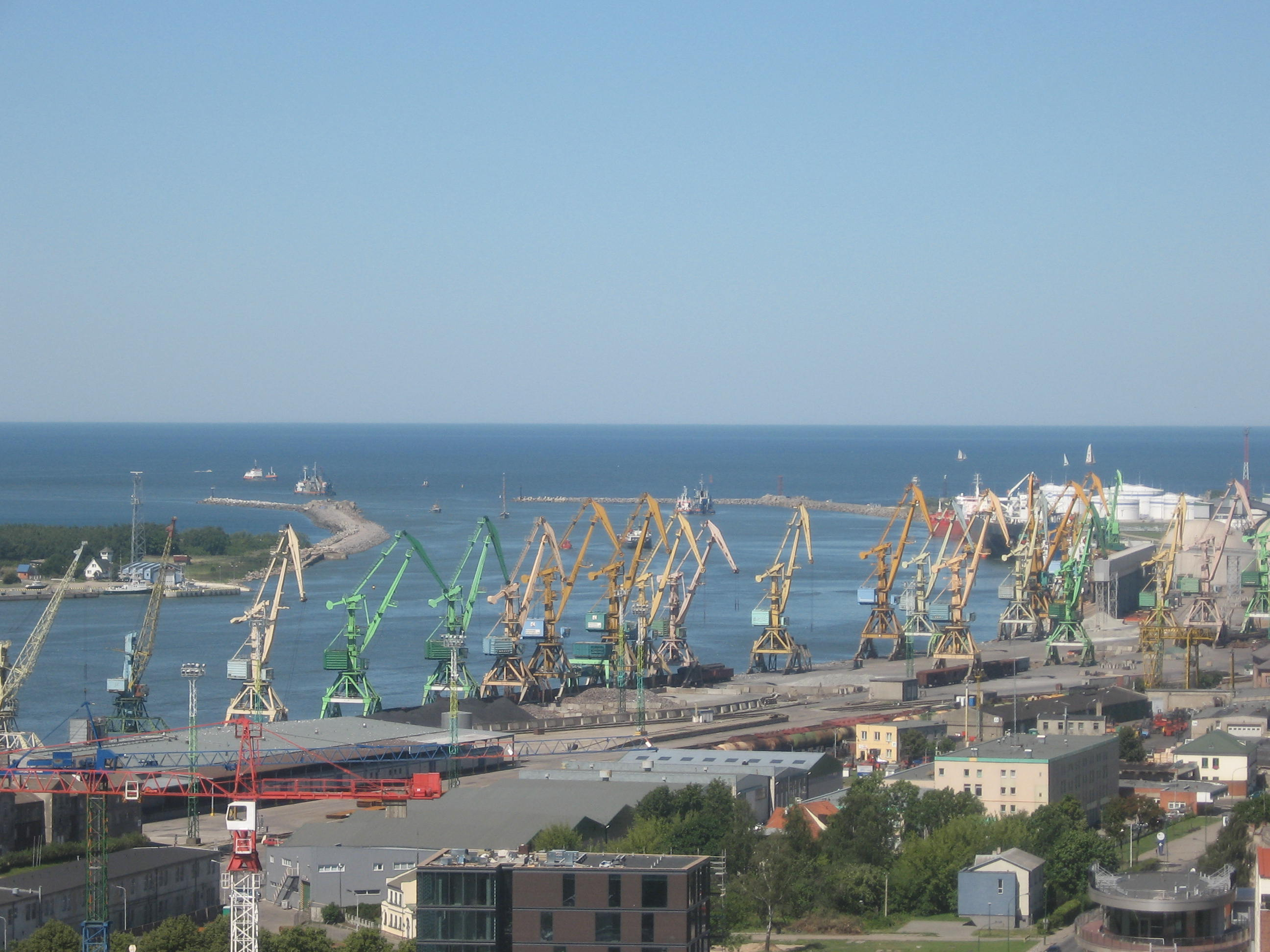
Terminal is located in Northern part of Port of Klaipėda (not in picture).

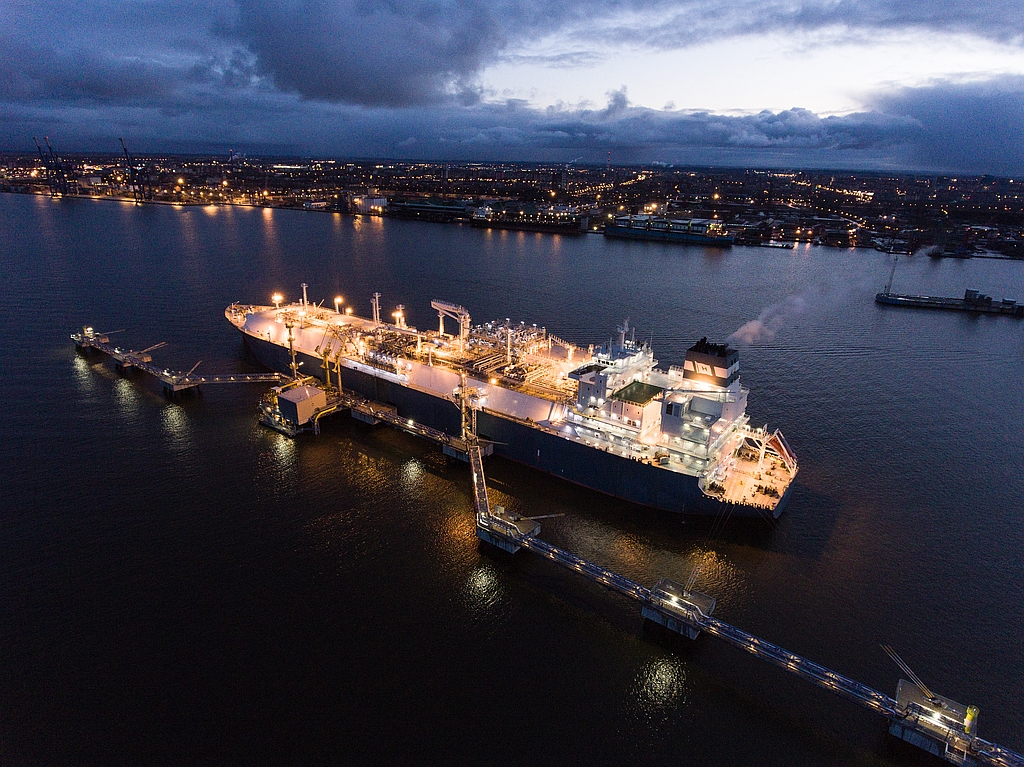
FSRU Independence in the port of Klaipėda

Klaipėda LNG terminal (Lithuanian: Klaipėdos suskystintų gamtinių dujų terminalas) is a liquefied natural gas import terminal in the port of Klaipėda, Lithuania. It cost US$128 million to construct. The developer and owner of the project is KN Energies.

The terminal started operating on 3 December 2014. After the completion of the Klaipėda LNG FSRU, Lithuania became the fifth country in the world to use FSRU technology for liquefied natural gas.

== History ==
On 22–27 January 2014 pilot test was conducted in order to assess the FSRU Independence's performance and seaworthiness. Later on the vessel sailed to the sea and the ship's sea trial lasted nearly a week. Earlier, in the beginning of January the ship's propulsion system was tested, later crew safety equipment and other range of testing conducted. It was delivered in March 2014 and was reached the terminal on 27 October 2014.

In June 2014 supplying platform was finished to be built in Kiaulės Nugara. It is one of the four main elements of 450-metre (1,480 ft) length embankment (together with mounting and mooring field, steel bridges and high-pressure gas platform).

On 27 October 2014 the main vessel arrived to Klaipėda's Port. The welcoming ceremony of Independence arrival was broadcast live by national broadcaster LRT televizija, while the ship was greeted by Lithuanian President Dalia Grybauskaitė. Representatives from Latvia, Estonia, Norway, the United States, Finland, Sweden and European Council also participated at the opening.

On 3 December 2014 the terminal started operating.

On 27 October 2017, LNG Distribution Station at Klaipėda Port started operating. Station is dedicated to create a comprehensive LNG logistics chain in the Baltic region.

On 7 January 2019, the world's largest liquefied natural gas bunkering vessel Kairos, owned by KN and German company Nauticor, was launched at that time. The ship's main activity in Klaipėda port is to transport LNG from the LNG terminal to LNG distribution station. In September 2019, Klaipėdos Nafta sold its shares in Kairos, the company that owns the bunkering vessel Kairos.

On 6 December 2024, the Klaipėda LNG terminal operator, the state-owned KN Energies (formerly Klaipėdos Nafta), officially bought the FSRU from the Norwegian company Höegh Evi (formerly Hoegh LNG) for US$153.5 million, and the same day the FSRU was registered in the Lithuanian Register of Sea Ships. At the takeover ceremony, the Lithuanian state flag was hoisted on the FSRU and homeport changed from Singapore to Klaipėda.

== Storage and regasification vessel ==
FSRU Independence, an LNG carrier built by Hyundai Heavy Industries, is designed as a floating LNG storage and regasification unit for the terminal. It is leased from Höegh LNG for 10 years with an option of buyout. In December 2024, the FSRU was sold to the Lithuanian company KN Energies.

FSRU Independence has a maximum capacity to handle of 3.75 billion cubic metres per annum (132 billion cubic feet per annum) of natural gas, while it has four storage tanks with total capacity of 170,000 cubic metres (6,000,000 cu ft). Lithuania also has access to the Inčukalns underground gas storage facility in Latvia.

== Supply ==
Equinor was contracted to supply LNG for five years to cover the minimum operational need of the terminal. In 2015, Equinor was to supply 540 million cubic metres (19 billion cubic feet) of natural gas. The first test cargo was delivered on 28 October 2014 by LNG tanker Golar Seal. Gas was originating from the Snøhvit field (Melkøya LNG plant). It was imported by Litgas, a subsidiary of Lietuvos Energija.

At the beginning of 2016, a renewed contract was signed with a change in the price formula, a reduction in the annual volume of gas supplied, and an extension of the contract duration until the end of 2024. At the end of 2024, it was decided not to renew this contract.

== Awards ==
At the 8th European Gas Conference 2015 in Vienna, Austria Klaipėda LNG FSRU won the Project of the Year award.

== Supporting infrastructure ==
Previously Klaipėda was only connected to one main pipeline of Klaipėda–Panevėžys pipeline within Lithuanian gas grid.

To ensure continuous supply of gas from Klaipėda LNG FSRU to Lithuanian gas market, additional main gas pipelines built, connecting to the terminal:

- Klaipėda–Jurbarkas pipeline, opened in 2013.
- Klaipėda–Kuršėnai pipeline, opened in 2015.

== See also ==
- Energy in Lithuania
- Gas Interconnection Poland–Lithuania – Natural gas pipeline
- List of LNG terminals
- Świnoujście LNG terminal – LNG terminal in Poland
- Inkoo LNG terminal – LNG terminal in Finland
