= Minsk–Kaliningrad Interconnection =

Natural gas pipeline connecting Belarus, Lithuania and Russia

Minsk–Kaliningrad Interconnection Minsko–Kaliningrado dujotiekis
- Map of Minsk–Kaliningrad Interconnection; Minsko–Kaliningrado dujotiekis

Location
- Country: Belarus; Lithuania; Russia
- Direction: east-west
- Start: Minsk, Belarus
- Passes through: Belarus-Lithuania border, Vilnius, Jonava, Kaunas, Šakiai, Lithuania-Russia border
- To: Kaliningrad, Russia

General information
- Type: natural gas
- Partners: Amber Grid; Gazprom
- Commissioned: 1988

Technical information
- Maximum discharge: 2.5 billion cubic metres per annum (88×10^{9} cu ft/a)
- Diameter: 700 mm (28 in)

The Minsk–Kaliningrad Interconnection (Minsko–Kaliningrado dujotiekis) is a natural gas pipeline interconnection between Kaliningrad Oblast of Russia, Lithuania and Belarus. Currently, it is the only pipeline supplying natural gas to Kaliningrad Oblast.

Lithuania has a contract with Gazprom on gas transit to Kaliningrad via pipeline until 2025.

== History ==
The construction of the pipeline was completed in 1988.

In 2005, Gazprom built the Krasnoznamenskaya compressor station.

In 2009, the second line of the pipeline was finished, which allowed the expanded maximum discharge of up to 2.5 billion cubic metres annually.

In 2016, a 25 km gas pipeline branch to Chernyakhovsk and an automated gas distribution station were put into service.

In October 2017, Gazprom completed the construction of two gas pipeline branches stretching to the towns of Gusev and Sovetsk.

In April 2022, President of Lithuania Gitanas Nausėda announced that Lithuanian national gas transmission operator Amber Grid and Lithuania have completely stopped purchasing Russian gas, and the transmission system has been operating without Russian gas imports since the beginning of April with no intention to receive the Russian gas in the future via Minsk–Kaliningrad Interconnection.

== Connection to Jonava ==
In 2019, Amber Grid renovated a gas distribution station in Jonava, Lithuania. The new station's capacity expanded to 2.3 billion cubic metres per annum (81×10^{9} cu ft/a) and supplied the Achema plant in Jonava, the largest consumer of natural gas in Lithuania. In October 2021 the proposed reconstruction project for the Jonava link was released.

Jonava connection within Minsk–Kaliningrad Interconnection

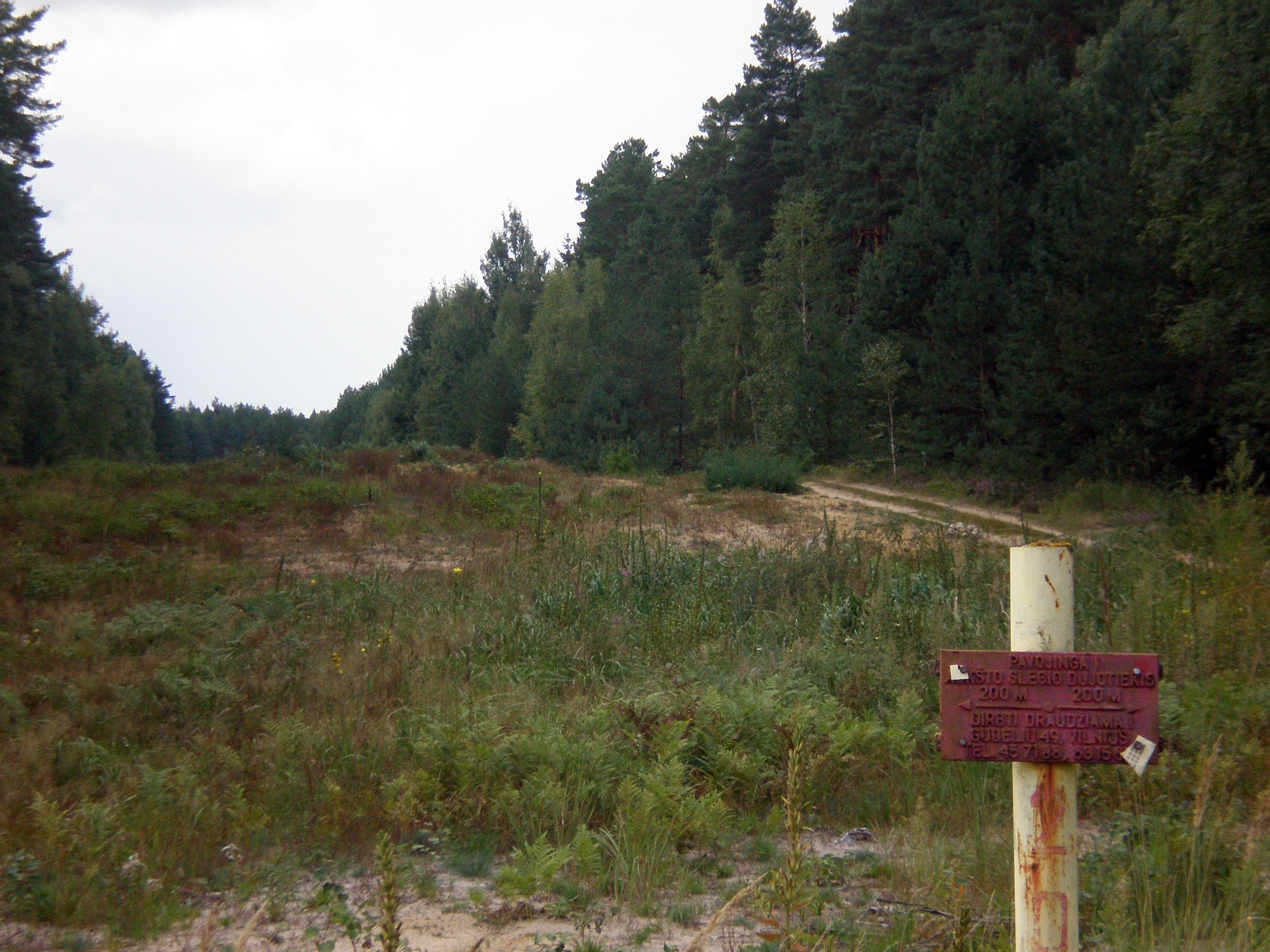
Pipeline near Gaižiūnai

== See also ==
- Gas Interconnection Poland–Lithuania
- Lithuania–Latvia Interconnection
