= KN Energies =

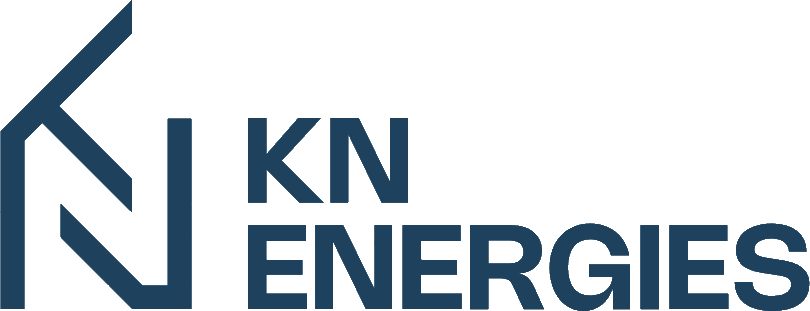
- Type: State controlled
- Traded as: Nasdaq Baltic: KNE1L
- Industry: Oil and gas industry
- Founded: 1994
- Headquarters: Klaipėda, Lithuania
- Key people: Darius Šilenskis (CEO)
- Services: Oil and LNG terminals operator
- Revenue: ▲€105.2 million (2025)
- Operating income: ▲€21 million (2025)
- Net income: ▲€18.2 million (2025)
- Owner: Ministry of Energy (Lithuania) (72.47%); Other shareholders (27.53%)
- Number of employees: 416 (2025)
- Website: knenergies.lt

KN Energies (Klaipėdos Nafta until 2024) is a liquid energy product and LNG terminals operator based in Klaipėda, Lithuania. The company was founded in 1994. The company operates the Klaipėda, Subačius and Marijampolė liquid energy products terminals, Klaipėda LNG terminal, Klaipėda small-scale LNG reloading station, other LNG terminals in Brazil and Germany. Since 2015 company have been actively engaged in the development of numerous LNG projects worldwide providing LNG business development services.

== Klaipėda Liquid Energy Products Terminal ==
The Klaipėda Liquid Energy Products Terminal was commissioned on 27 November 1959 and its exported fuel oil from Soviet oil refineries in Yaroslavl, Perm, and Ryazan. As of today, the main customer of the terminal is the ORLEN Lietuva oil refinery in Mažeikiai. The terminal served also crude oil shipments to Belarus.

== LNG terminal ==
KN Energies is an operator of the Lithuanian LNG terminal and owner of its floating storage and regasification unit FSRU Independence. The consultant of the project was Fluor Corporation. The terminal was launched on December 3, 2014. The terminal is using a liquefied natural gas floating storage and regasification unit with a capacity up to 3.75 billion cubic metres (132 billion cubic feet) of natural gas per year.
