= FSRU Independence =

Lithuanian floating LNG import terminal

Coordinates: 55.664457°N 21.137649°E

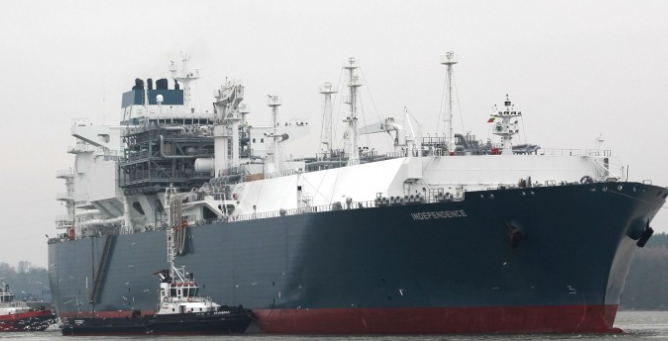
- FSRU Independence

History
- Name: FSRU Independence
- Owner: „KN Energies”, Klaipėda, Lithuania
- Port of registry: Klaipėda, Lithuania
- Builder: Hyundai Heavy Industries
- Cost: Ca. $330,000,000 USD
- Yard number: 2549
- Laid down: 2012
- Launched: 2014
- In service: 2014
- Identification: Call sign: 9V7190; IMO number: 9629536; MMSI number: 563614000
- Status: In service

General characteristics
- Type: LNG carrier
- Tonnage: 109,793 GT; 36,732 NT; 82,028 DWT
- Length: 294 m (964 ft 7 in)
- Beam: 46 m (150 ft 11 in)
- Draft: 12.6 m (41 ft 4 in)
- Propulsion: Dual fuel diesel electric
- Speed: 18 knots (33 km/h; 21 mph)
- Capacity: 170,000 m^{3} (6,000,000 cu ft)
- Notes: To be used for ten years as a floating LNG storage and regasification unit as an LNG imported terminal in Lithuania.

FSRU Independence, delivered in March 2014 is a LNG carrier designed as a floating LNG storage and regasification unit (FSRU) owned by KN Energies (previously owned by Höegh Evi) to be used as a LNG import terminal in Lithuania. The vessel can store 170,000 m^{3} (6,000,000 cu ft) of natural gas and can supply all of Lithuania's need for natural gas. The vessel started operating in the autumn of 2014.

Built by Hyundai in South Korea, it arrived at Klaipėda on 27 October 2014, after a five-month cruise.

Charterer KN Energies has made a decision to purchase the FSRU from its owner Leif Höegh & Co no later than December 2024 which marks the end of 10-year term lease agreement executed between the parties.

On 6 December 2024, the Klaipėda LNG terminal operator, the state-owned KN Energies (formerly Klaipėdos Nafta), officially bought the FSRU from the Norwegian company Höegh Evi (formerly Hoegh LNG) for USD 153.5 million, and the same day the FSRU was registered in the Lithuanian Register of Sea Ships. At the takeover ceremony, the Lithuanian state flag was hoisted on the FSRU and homeport changed from Singapore to Klaipėda.

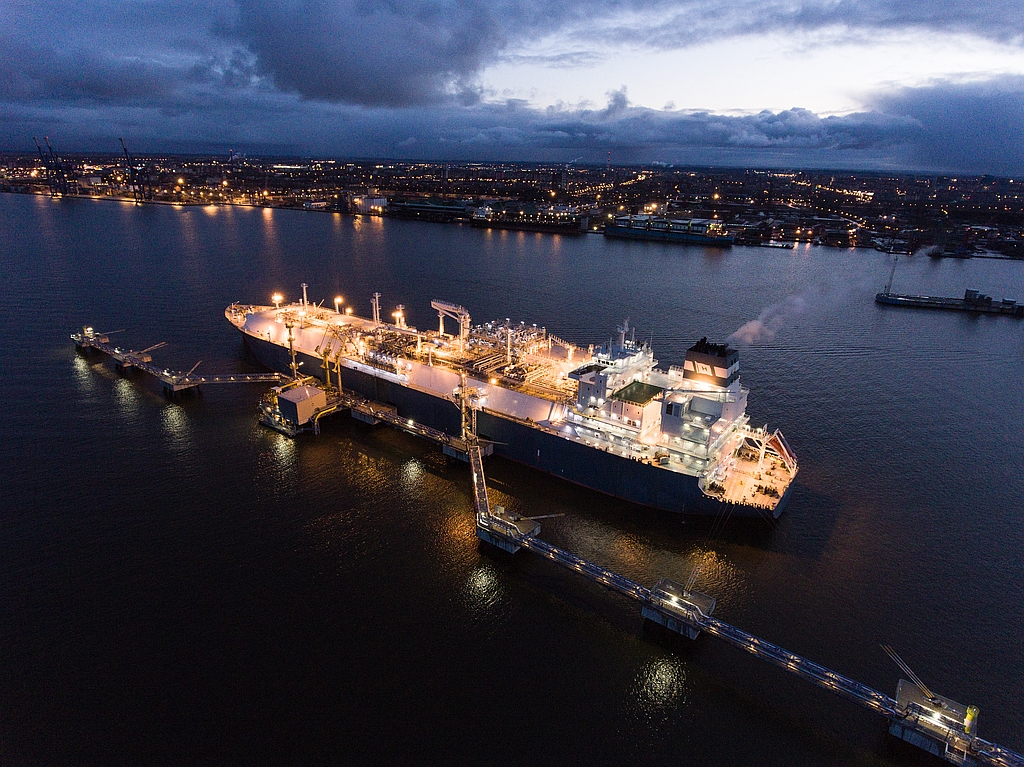
FSRU Independence in the port of Klaipėda
