= Jauniūnai =

- Village
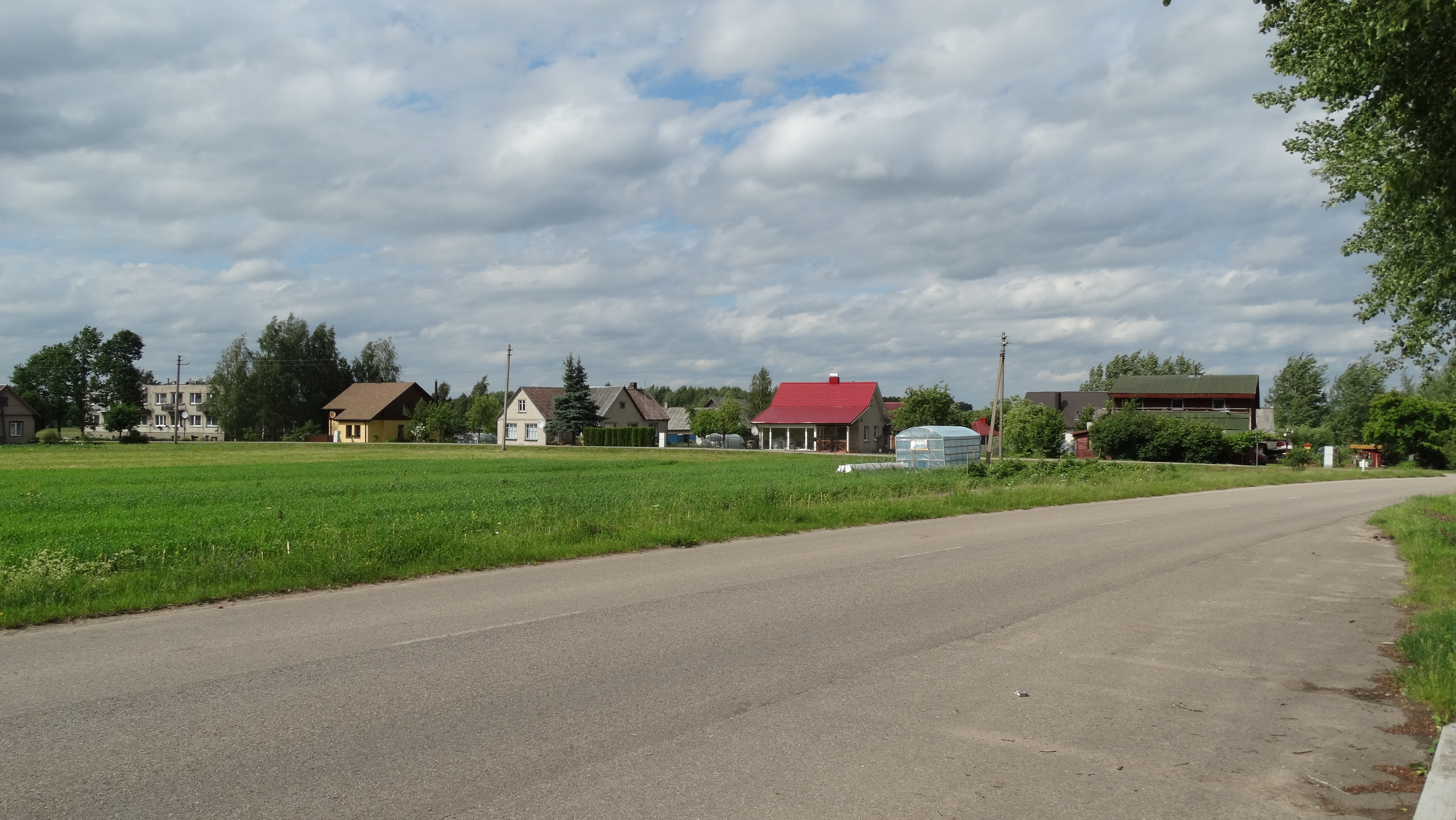
- Jauniūnai eldership, Širvintos District, Lithuania

- Location of Glitiškės
- Coordinates: 54°56′20″N 25°00′50″E
- Country: Lithuania
- County: Vilnius County
- Municipality: Širvintos district municipality
- Eldership: Jauniūnai eldership

Population (2011)
  - Total: 165
- Time zone: UTC+2 (EET)
  - Summer (DST): UTC+3 (EEST)

Jauniūnai is a village in the Širvintos District Municipality, Lithuania. It is near the A2 highway and European route E272. It had 185 residents at the time of the 2001 census.

Jauniūnai has a natural gas compression station, which is why the village was selected as the terminus of the planned Lithuania–Poland pipeline.
