= Amber Grid =

Lithuanian gas transmission company

AB Amber Grid
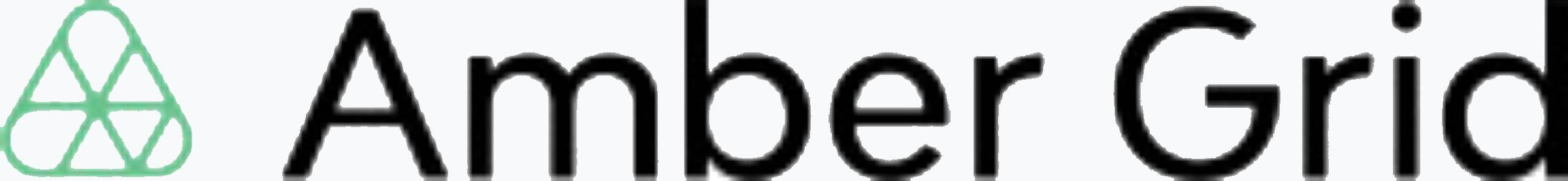

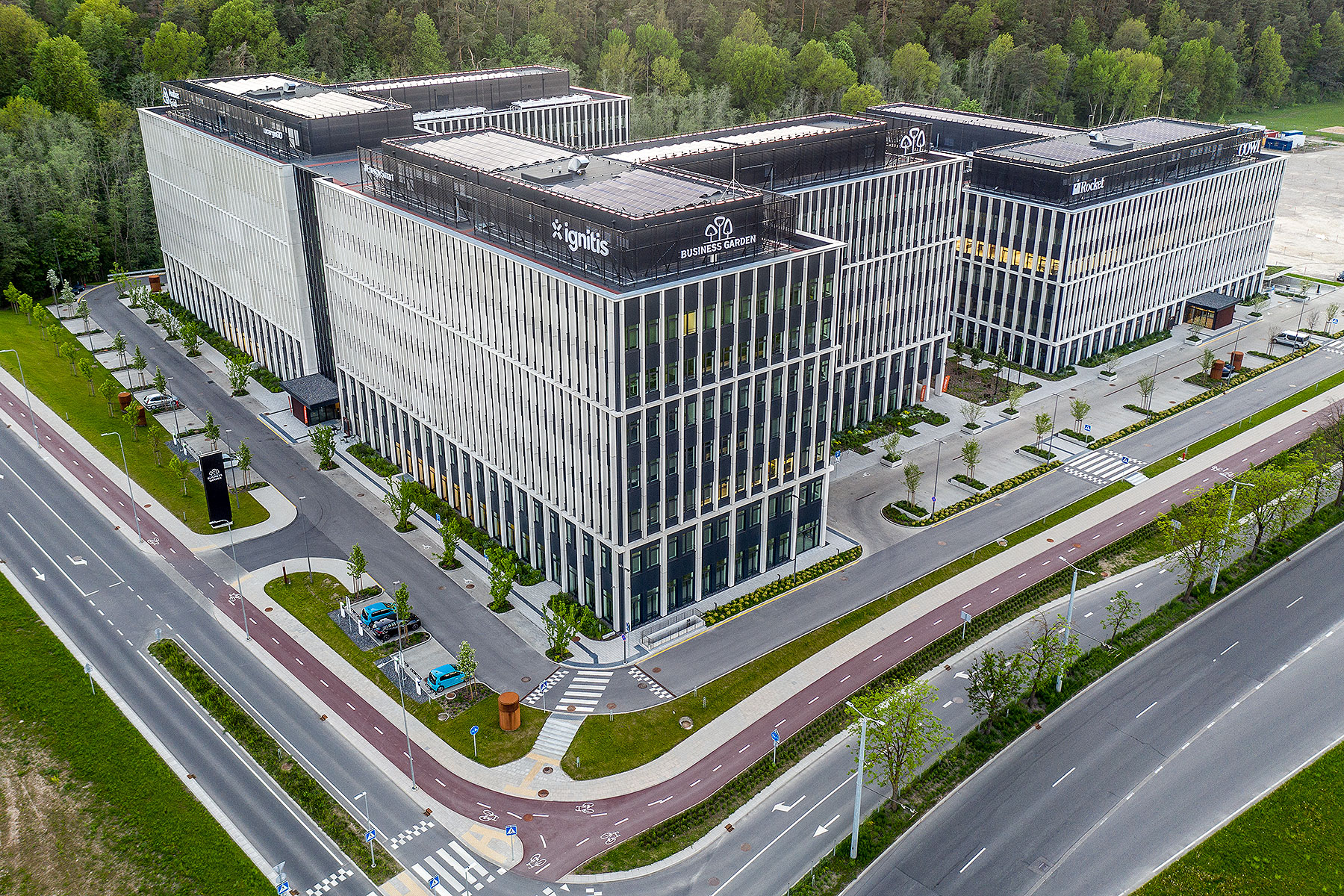
- Amber Grid headquarters in Vilnius
- Company type: Joint stock company
- Traded as: Nasdaq Baltic: AMG1L
- Industry: Energy
- Founded: 2013
- Headquarters: Vilnius, Lithuania
- Key people: Nemunas Biknius (Chairman); Saulius Bilys (CEO)
- Products: Natural gas transmission
- Revenue: €66.983 million (2022)
- Owner: Ministry of Energy
- Number of employees: 349
- Website: www.ambergrid.lt

Gas pipeline network in Lithuania

AB Amber Grid is the main natural gas transmission operator in Lithuania. It was established in 2013 by spin-off of gas transmission operations from the gas company Lietuvos Dujos.

Amber Grid owns all main pipelines in Lithuania, including natural gas compressor stations and natural gas metering and distribution stations.

Amber Grid is a member of the European Network of Transmission System Operators for Gas (ENTSOG).

In April 2022, President of Lithuania Gitanas Nausėda announced that Lithuanian national gas transmission operator Amber Grid and Lithuania has completely stopped purchasing Russian gas and the transmission system has been operating without Russian gas imports since the beginning of April with no intention to receive Russian gas in the future via Minsk–Kaliningrad Interconnection. Lithuania became the first EU country to end imports of Russian gas following the 2022 Russian invasion of Ukraine.

== See also ==
- Gas Interconnection Poland–Lithuania
- Lithuania–Latvia Interconnection
