= Gas Interconnection Poland–Lithuania =

Natural gas pipeline

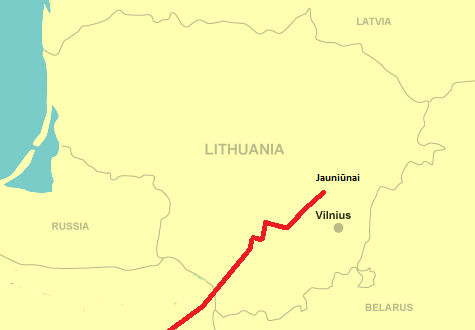
- Map of Gas Interconnection Poland–Lithuania

Location
- Country: Lithuania; Poland
- Coordinates: 54°57′44″N 24°59′52″E
- Start: Hołowczyce, Poland
- Passes through: Lithuania–Poland border
- To: Jauniūnai, Širvintos DM, Lithuania

General information
- Type: Natural gas
- Partners: Amber Grid; Gaz-System
- Contractors: Izostal, Alvora, Šiaulių dujotiekio statyba
- Construction started: January 2020
- Commissioned: 1 May 2022

Technical information
- Length: 508 km (316 mi)
- Maximum discharge: 2.3 billion cubic metres per annum (81×10^{9} cu ft/a)
- Diameter: 700 mm (28 in)
- Compressor stations: Jauniūnai natural gas compression station

Gas Interconnection Poland–Lithuania (GIPL) is a gas pipeline between Poland and Lithuania. The pipeline was commissioned and started commercial operation on 1 May 2022. The length of the pipeline is 508 km (316 mi) and the natural gas can flow both directions. The pipeline will run from Jauniūnai natural gas compression station (GCS) in eastern Lithuania to the Hołowczyce GCS station in eastern Poland.

The project was implemented by gas transmission system operators AB Amber Grid (Lithuania) and Gaz-System SA (Poland). The completion of GIPL integrated Lithuania, together with the other two Baltic states and Finland, into the European Union (EU) gas transmission system.

== History ==
GIPL in Lithuania's major pipelines system (red)

Although the idea of gas interconnection between Poland and Lithuania can be traced as early as 1992, more active preparatory works started in 2008–2009. At that time, Poland considered interconnection with neighbouring states and construction of an LNG terminal in Swinoujscie. During these years the first analysis on connecting Polish and Lithuanian gas networks was conducted. From 2011 to 2013, a business case analysis and feasibility study was conducted. On 5 November 2014, part of the project in the territory of Lithuania was recognised as an important economic project for the state. On 11 November 2014 the European Commission decided to fund the project with €306 million through the Connecting Europe Facility fund. Before that, in August 2014, the EU Agency for the Cooperation of Energy Regulators (ACER) at the request of project promoters made a decision on cross-border cost allocation between Poland, Lithuania, Latvia and Estonia. On 29 August 2015, environmental impact assessment procedures for GIPL in the territory of Lithuania were finalized.

At first, the route of GIPL was planned to connect Rembelszczyzna GCS, which is located near Warsaw, to Jauniūnai GCS. However, in 2016, Poland informed Lithuania about the difficulties with the needed extension of Rembelszczyzna GCS and proposed an alternative routing of GIPL to connect Jauniūnai GCS with Hołowczyce GCS, which is near the Belarusian border. The change stipulated a shorter route and lower investments into infrastructure. On 27 September 2016, all permissions for the part of the GIPL project on Lithuanian territory were obtained. In May 2018 natural gas transmission system operators of Poland, Lithuania, Latvia and Estonia signed agreement detailing the procedures on how ACER decision on GIPL cross-border cost allocation should be implemented. In the summer of 2018, Amber Grid announced procurement of the construction and gas pipes supply (in Lithuanian territory). In June 2019, it was announced that steel pipes would be provided by Polish company Izostal. In July 2019 company Alvora together with partner Šiaulių dujotiekio statyba were chosen as contractors for GIPL construction in Lithuanian territory.

In February 2022, Amber Grid announced that the commercial operation with limited capacity will start 1 May 2022. The full capacity will be available from October 2022 onwards.

== Technical details ==
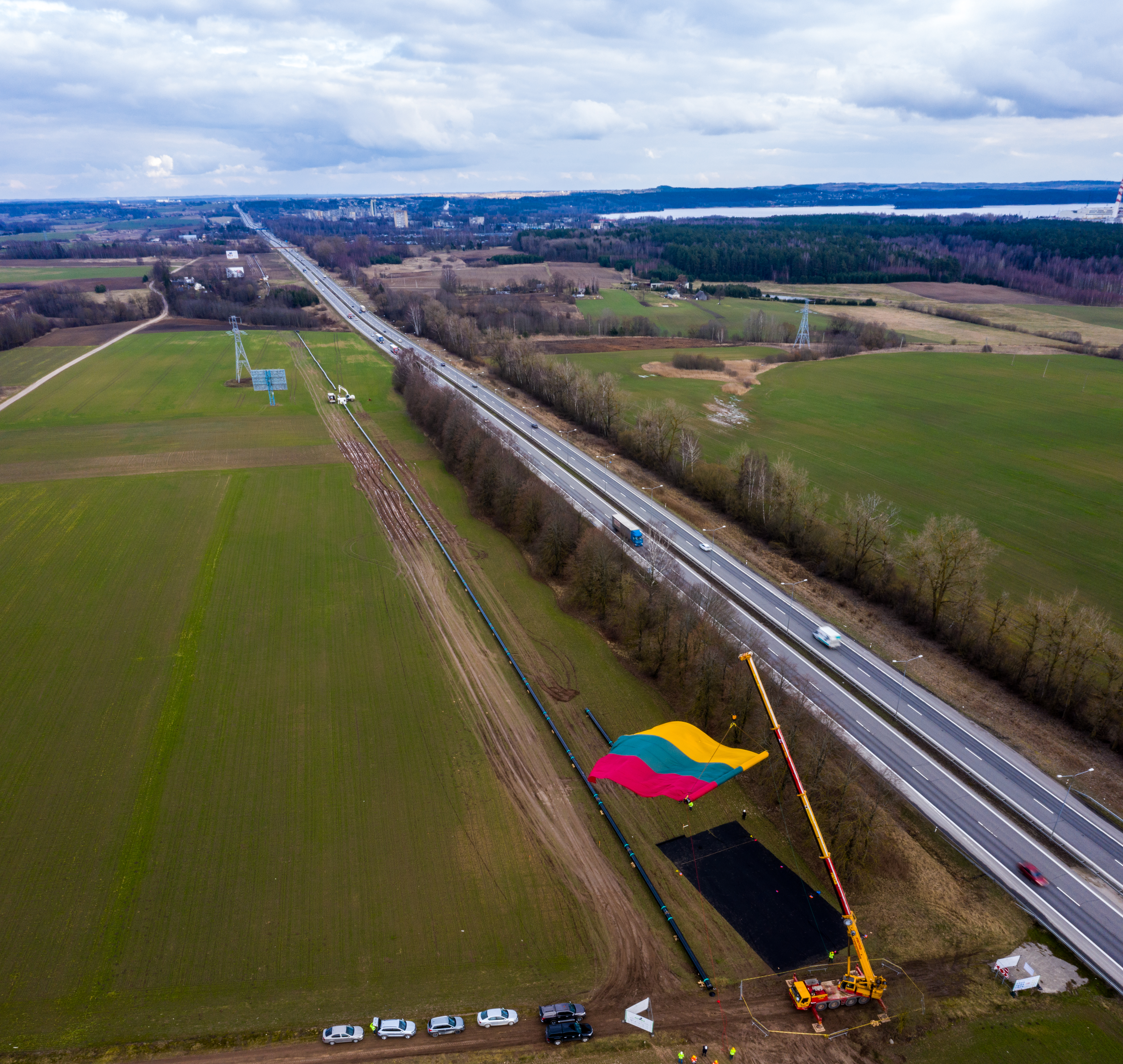
Construction of the gas interconnection in 2020.

The length of GIPL is 508 km (316 mi), the diameter of pipes is 700 mm (28 in). Gas pipeline stretches from Jauniūnai GCS in Lithuania to Hołowczyce GCS in Poland. The length of the pipeline in Poland amounts to 343 km (213 mi), while in Lithuania – to around 165 km (103 mi). The interconnection capacity from Poland to Lithuania is 27 TWh/year or 2.4 bcm/year, while from Lithuania to Poland the interconnection capacity is 21 TWh/year or 1.9 bcm/year. The designed pressure in the Polish territory is 8.4 MPa, while in the Lithuanian territory – 5.4 MPa.

== Price and financing ==
Altogether the price of GIPL project was around 500 million euros. The project was co-financing with EU Connecting Europe Facility developments funds worth 306 million euros. Following the decision of the EU Agency for the Cooperation of Energy Regulators (ACER), the Baltic countries covered €86 million of Poland's costs in the project. Lithuania paid €55 million of that, Latvia €29 million, and Estonia €1.5 million.

== Significance ==
In 2015, the European Commission has recognised GIPL project as a Project of Common Interest (PCI). Before the pipeline was built, Baltic countries and Finland could only receive pipeline gas from Russia. The only access to alternative gas sources and suppliers in the region was liquified natural gas import with FSRU Independence, which started operating in 2014, in Klaipėda, Lithuania. After GIPL was commissioned, Baltic countries and Finland were integrated into the EU gas transmission network and the Baltic region gained access to more alternative gas sources with enhanced security of supply and competition. In 2019, it was estimated that GIPL capacity would be able to satisfy more than 40 percent of annual natural gas demand in the Baltic countries and Finland.

== See also ==
- 2022 Russia–European Union gas dispute – Fossil fuel financing-related conflicts
- Harmony Link – Planned electricity link between Lithuania and Poland
- List of main natural gas pipelines in Lithuania
- List of high-voltage transmission links in Lithuania
- List of natural gas pipelines
- LitPol Link – Electricity link between Poland and Lithuania
