= Pasvalys District Municipality =

Coordinates: 56°03′29″N 24°23′06″E

Pasvalys District Municipality Pasvalio rajono savivaldybė
- Municipality
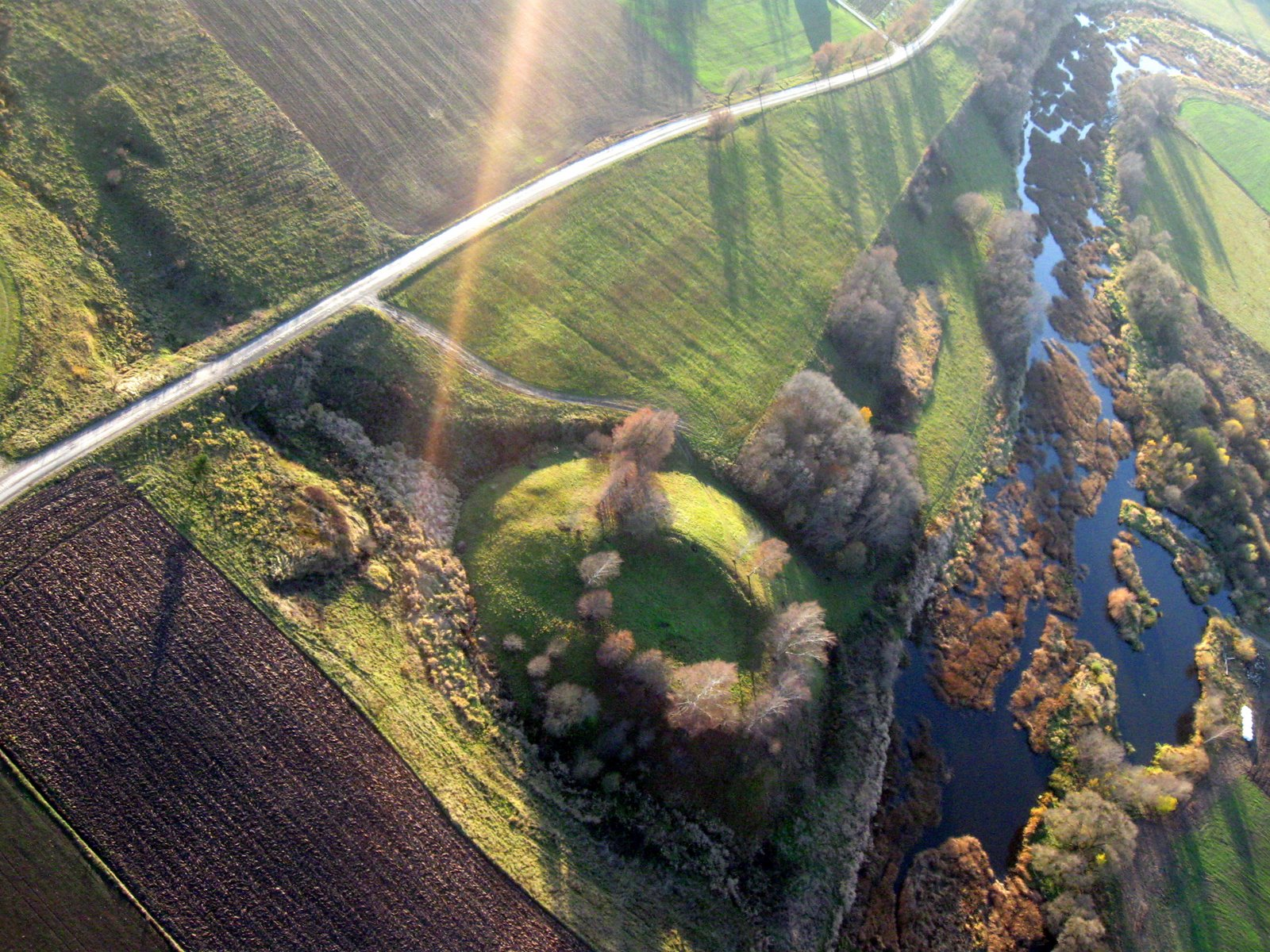
- Migoniai mound

- Coat of arms

- Location of Pasvalys district municipality within Lithuania

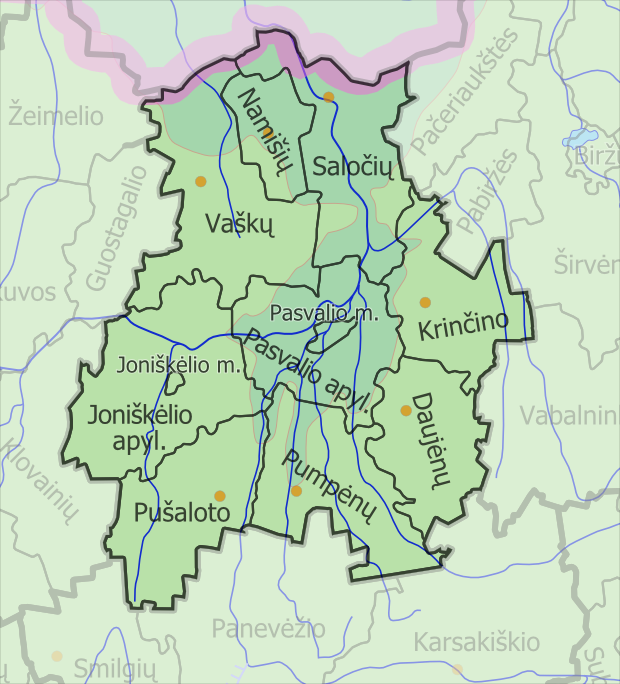
- Map of Pasvalys district municipality
- Country: Lithuania
- Ethnographic region: Aukštaitija
- County: Panevėžys County
- Capital: Pasvalys
- Elderships: 11

Area
  - Total: 1,289 km^{2} (498 sq mi)
  - Rank: 27th

Population (2021)
  - Total: 23,148
  - Rank: 36th
  - Density: 17.96/km^{2} (46.51/sq mi)
  - Rank: 37th
- Time zone: UTC+2 (EET)
  - Summer (DST): UTC+3 (EEST)
- Telephone code: 451
- Major settlements: Pasvalys (pop. 6,361)
- Website: www.pasvalys.lt

Pasvalys District Municipality is one of 60 municipalities in Lithuania.

== Structure ==
District structure:

- 2 cities – Joniškėlis and Pasvalys;
- 7 towns – Daujėnai, Krikliniai, Krinčinas, Pumpėnai, Pušalotas, Saločiai and Vaškai;
- 398 villages.

Population of largest elderships of Pasvalys District Municipality (2001):

- Pasvalys – 8709
- Joniškėlis – 1477
- Pumpėnai – 952
- Saločiai – 913
- Pušalotas – 885
- Vaškai – 688
- Mikoliškis – 617
- Ustukiai – 615
- Narteikiai – 603
- Pajiešmeniai – 603
