= List of power stations in Lithuania =

The following page lists the largest power stations in Lithuania.

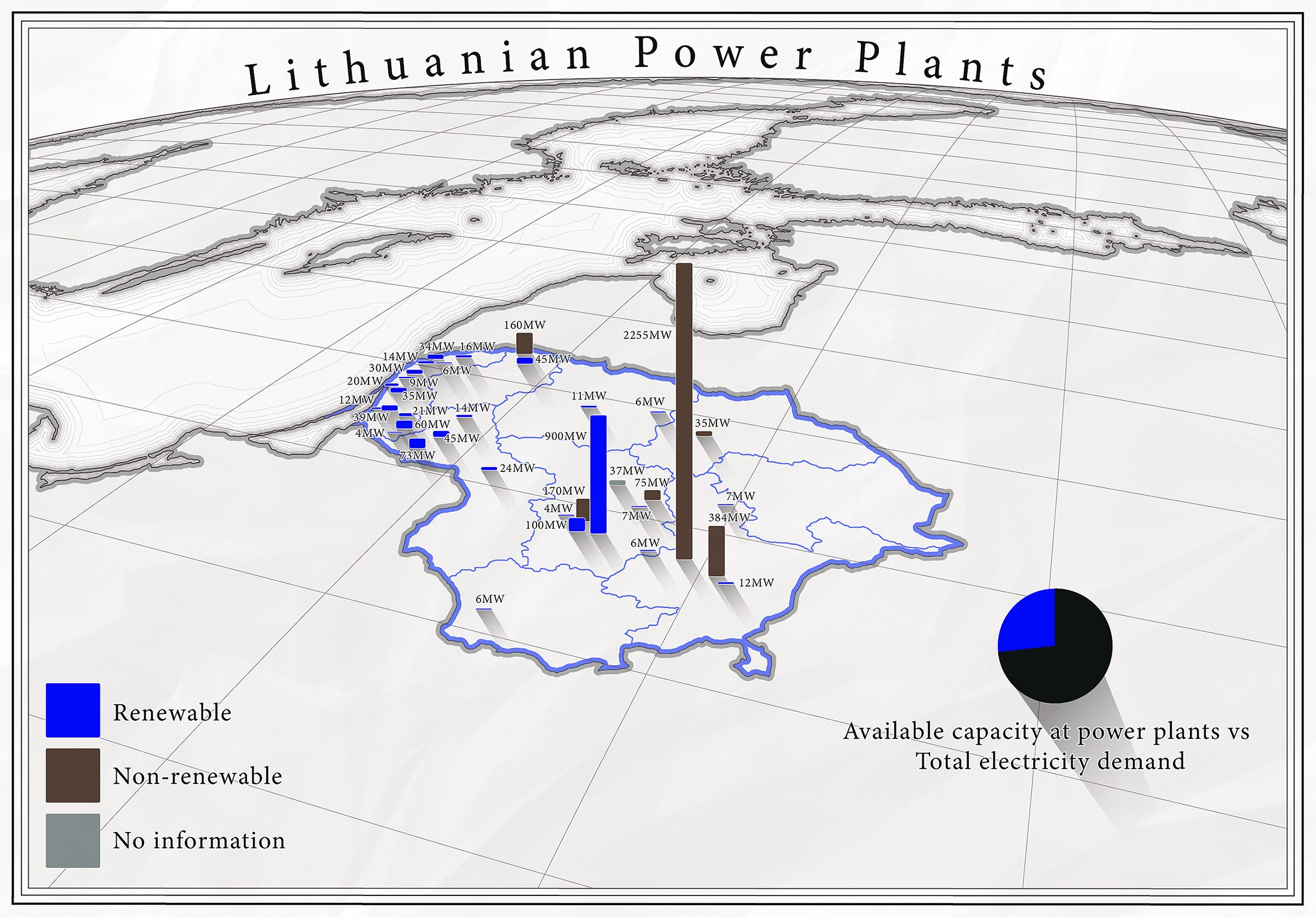
Map showing power production in Lithuania. (2019)

Name	Town	Coordinates	Type	Capacity	Years	Notes
Achema Power Plant	Jonava		Fossil fuel	75 MW	2006-present	Serves Achema factory
Ignalina Nuclear Power Plant	Visaginas	55.6055297°N 26.5624094°E	Nuclear	3000 MW	1984–2009	Two RBMK reactors. Decommissioned in 2009.
Elektrėnai Power Plant	Elektrėnai	54.7697761°N 24.647913°E	Fossil fuel	2255 MW	1962–present	Units 7-9 operational
Klaipėda Combined Heat and Power Plant	Klaipėda		Biomass	20 MW	2013–present	Supplies 50 MW heat power
Klaipėda Geothermal Demonstration Plant	Klaipėda	55.6844741°N 21.2017894°E	Geothermal	35 MW	2004–2017	
Kaunas Hydroelectric Power Plant	Kaunas	54.8739893°N 23.9994836°E	Hydroelectric	100 MW	1960–present	Created Kaunas Reservoir
Kruonis Pumped Storage Plant	Kruonis	54.7990769°N 24.2470837°E	Hydroelectric	900 MW	1992–present	4 units, 225 MW each
Lifosa Power Plant	Kėdainiai			37 MW		Serves Lifosa factory
Panevėžys Combined Heat and Power Plant	Panevėžys		Fossil fuel	35 MW	2008–present	
Petrašiūnai Thermal Power Plant	Kaunas		Fossil fuel	8 MW	1930–present	District-heating plant
Šiauliai Biomass Power Plant	Šiauliai		Biomass	11 MW	2012–present	Provides 27 MW heat power to Šiauliai
Vilnius Combined Heat and Power Plant	Vilnius	54.6677508°N 25.1558805°E	Fossil fuel	384 MW	1951–2016	
Vilnius Heat Plant	Vilnius		Fossil fuel	12 MW	1951–present	913 MW heating power
Vilnius Power Plant	Vilnius		Fossil fuel		1903–1998	The first power station in Lithuania. No longer active.
Kaunas Combined Heat and Power Plant	Kaunas	54.9211614°N 24.0188169°E	Fossil fuel	170 MW	1975–present	
Mažeikiai Combined Heat and Power Plant	Mažeikiai	56.38425°N 22.1841002°E	Fossil fuel	160 MW	1979–present	Serves oil refinery ORLEN Lietuva
Others				Fossil - 31 MW, Hydro - 101 MW, Wind - 1832 MW, Solar 2408 MW, Biomass - 161 MW		

== See also ==
- List of power stations in Europe
- List of largest power stations in the world
