= Petrašiūnai Thermal Power Plant =

Thermal power plant in Kaunas, Lithuania

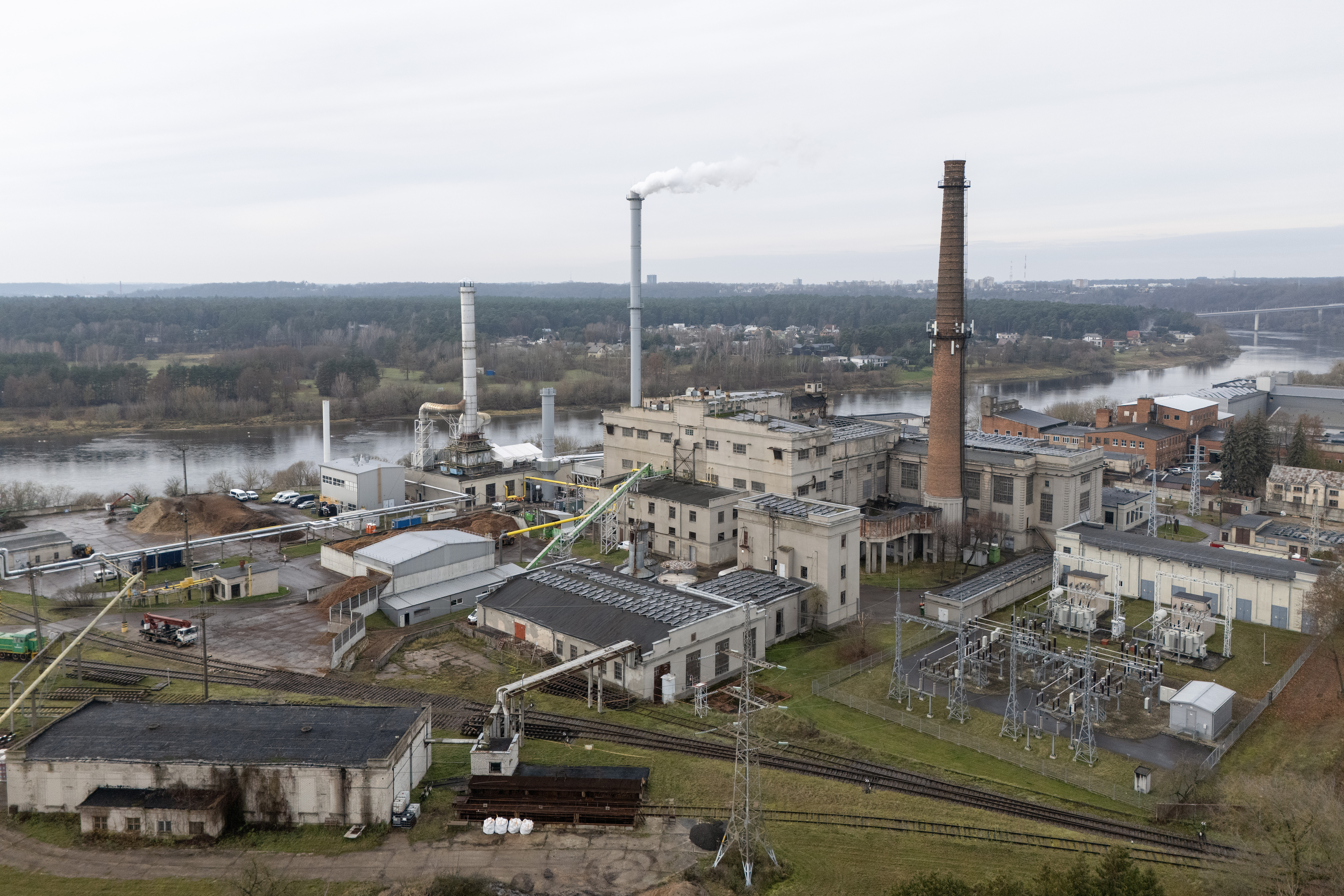
- Official name: Petrašiūnų šiluminė elektrinė
- Country: Lithuania
- Location: Kaunas
- Coordinates: 54°53′24″N 23°59′24″E
- Status: Operational
- Commission date: 1930
- Operator: AB Kauno energija

Thermal power station
- Primary fuel: Natural gas
- Secondary fuel: Biomass
- Tertiary fuel: Mazut
- Cogeneration?: Yes
- Thermal capacity: 314.6 MW

Power generation
- Nameplate capacity: 8 MW

Petrašiūnai Thermal Power Plant (Petrašiūnų šiluminė elektrinė) is a thermal power station in the Petrašiūnai district of Kaunas, Lithuania. It supplies heat for the Kaunas district heating network and generates electricity for the national grid. The plant has an installed thermal capacity of 314.6 MW and an electrical capacity of 8 MW, making it one of the main heat production sites operated by AB Kauno energija.

The plant was commissioned on 11 November 1930 as a steam power station and became one of Lithuania's largest electricity producers. By the late 1930s it operated three steam turbines, including a 10 MW unit added in 1938. The facility was destroyed by retreating German forces in 1944 but rebuilt and returned to service in 1946.

Between 1951 and 1958 four 12 MW turbines were added, and from 1963 to 1966 the plant was converted into a combined heat and power station. In 1975 it was integrated operationally with the nearby Kaunas CHP Plant. Since 1997 it has been owned and operated by AB Kauno energija, which has modernised the site with new biomass-fired boilers, a gas- and oil-fired peak-load unit, and an 80.6 m steel chimney completed in 2022.

Recent upgrades include an absorption heat pump installation and, in 2024, the commissioning of a 450 kW organic Rankine cycle turbine generating electricity from waste heat.

== See also ==
- List of power stations in Lithuania
