= Birutis =

- Lithuanian surname
- m.: Birutis
- f.: (unmarried): Birutytė
- f.: (married): Birutienė

Birutis' is a Lithuanian-language surname.

- Laurynas Birutis, Lithuanian basketballer
- Šarūnas Birutis, Lithuanian politician
