= Lifosa Power Plant =

Power plant in Kėdainiai, Lithuania

- Official name: Lifosos elektrinė
- Country: Lithuania
- Location: Kėdainiai
- Coordinates: 55°16′13″N 24°1′5″E
- Status: Operational
- Operator: Lifosa

Power generation
- Nameplate capacity: 37 MW

Lifosa Power Plant is a power plant in Kėdainiai, Lithuania. Its primary use is to serve the Lifosa factory.

In 2014, it had installed capacity of 37 MW.

== See also ==
- List of power stations in Lithuania
