= Kaunas Railway Tunnel =

Railway tunnel in Lithuania

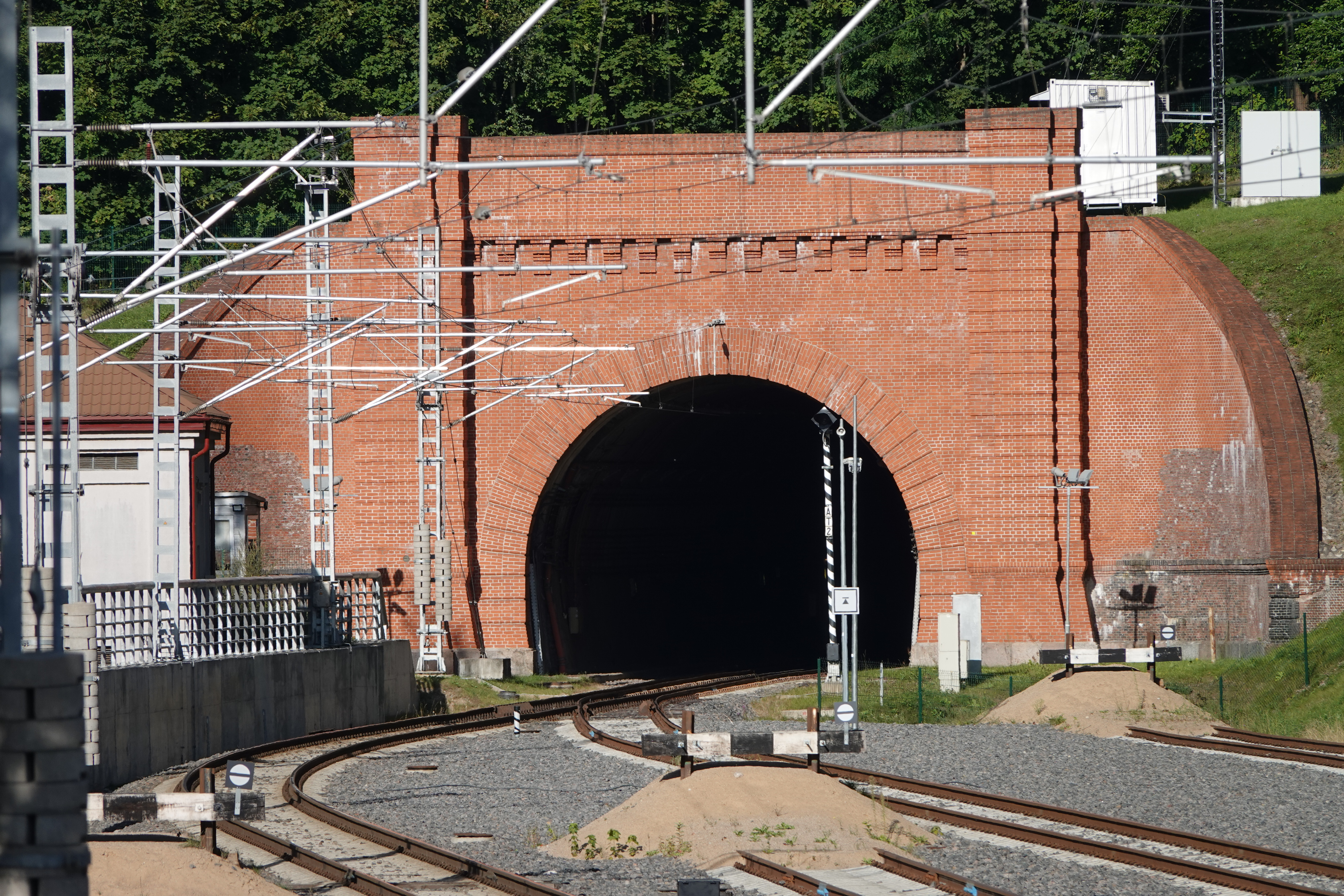
- Tunnel in 2022
- Interactive map of Kaunas Railway Tunnel

Overview
- Official name: Kauno geležinkelio tunelis
- Line: Vilnius–Kaunas Railway
- Location: Kaunas, Lithuania
- Coordinates: 54°53′30″N 23°56′31″E

Operation
- Work began: 1859
- Opened: 1862

Technical
- Length: 1,285 m (4,216 ft)
- Track gauge: 1,520 mm (4 ft 11 27/32 in); 1,435 mm (4 ft 8 1/2 in)
- Tunnel clearance: 6.6 m (22 ft)
- Width: 8.8 m (29 ft)

Kaunas railway tunnel (Lithuanian: Kauno geležinkelio tunelis) is one of the two railway tunnels existing in Lithuania and the only railway tunnel operating in the Baltic states. Passenger trains are operating between Vilnius and Kaunas through this tunnel. The length of the tunnel is 1,285 metres (0,803 miles), height – 6,6 metres, width – 8,8 metres. Kaunas railway tunnel was included into the Registry of Immovable Cultural Heritage Sites of the Republic of Lithuania in 1996.

== Background ==
After the Russian Empire lost the Crimean War, the importance of tactical use of modern inventions, such as railways was realised. In February 1851 the Tsarist Government of Russia made a decision to build the Saint Petersburg–Warsaw railway with a length of approximately 1,250 kilometres. It was built in Russian gauge. Starting from 1858 the railway line connecting Saint Petersburg and Warsaw was being built quite intensively. The government of Prussia addressed Russia asking permission to start building a railway from Virbalis, which was situated near its border, towards Lentvaris through Kaunas. However, the terrain around Kaunas' centre is hilly and unfavorable for the direct rail passage. The main and most complicated objects were the tunnel and largest in Lithuania railway bridge over the Nemunas river. The construction of the tunnel started on 15 May 1859, whereas the construction of the bridge started a bit earlier – at the end of April, 1859. The railway from Virbalis to Kaunas was also being built.

== Construction ==
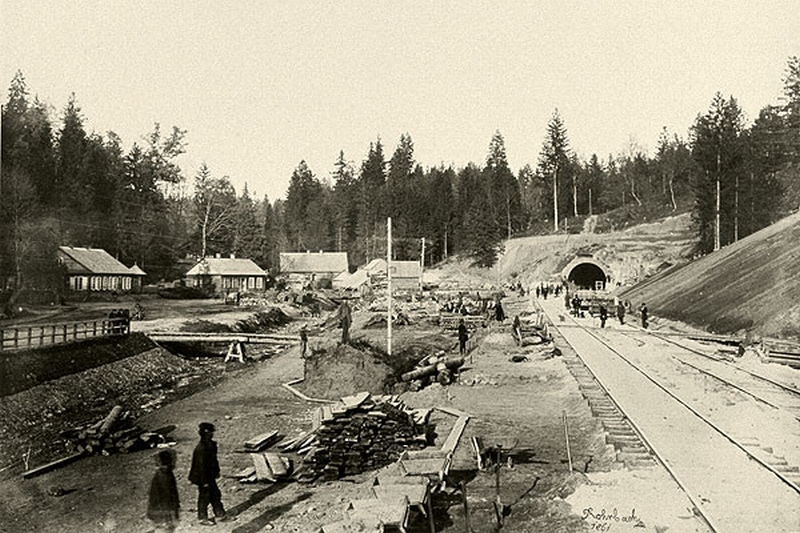
Construction of the tunnel

Kaunas railway tunnel was built from 1859 till 1861. The construction was surveyed by the French engineer G. F. Perrot, as well as Polish-Lithuanian engineer Stanisław Kierbedź. For construction works has been hired Ernest Goüin et Cie. company from Paris. The tunnel was dug from both sides in a 30-metre-high hill, under the residential area of Šančiai of Kaunas. The tunnel's diameter has the shape of a horseshoe. The upper part was made of bricks (stonework), the lower part, which is used as a basement, is made of granite stones. Seven pits were built at the time of construction of tunnel. Through them the steam machines could eliminate the excavated soil. Ernest Goüin et Cie also built two brickyards in Šančiai and Petrašiūnai areas, because especially good quality bricks were needed for the tunnel arches, water passes and other constructions. The summer of 1860 was rainy, therefore many produced bricks were found to be defective. In order to proceed with the construction, the bricks were bought and delivered from the Netherlands and Germany. The construction of the tunnel was finished on 15 November 1861. The exploitation of the railway bridge over the Nemunas river started on 4 February 1862. The tunnel started operating in spring, 1862.

== Operation history ==
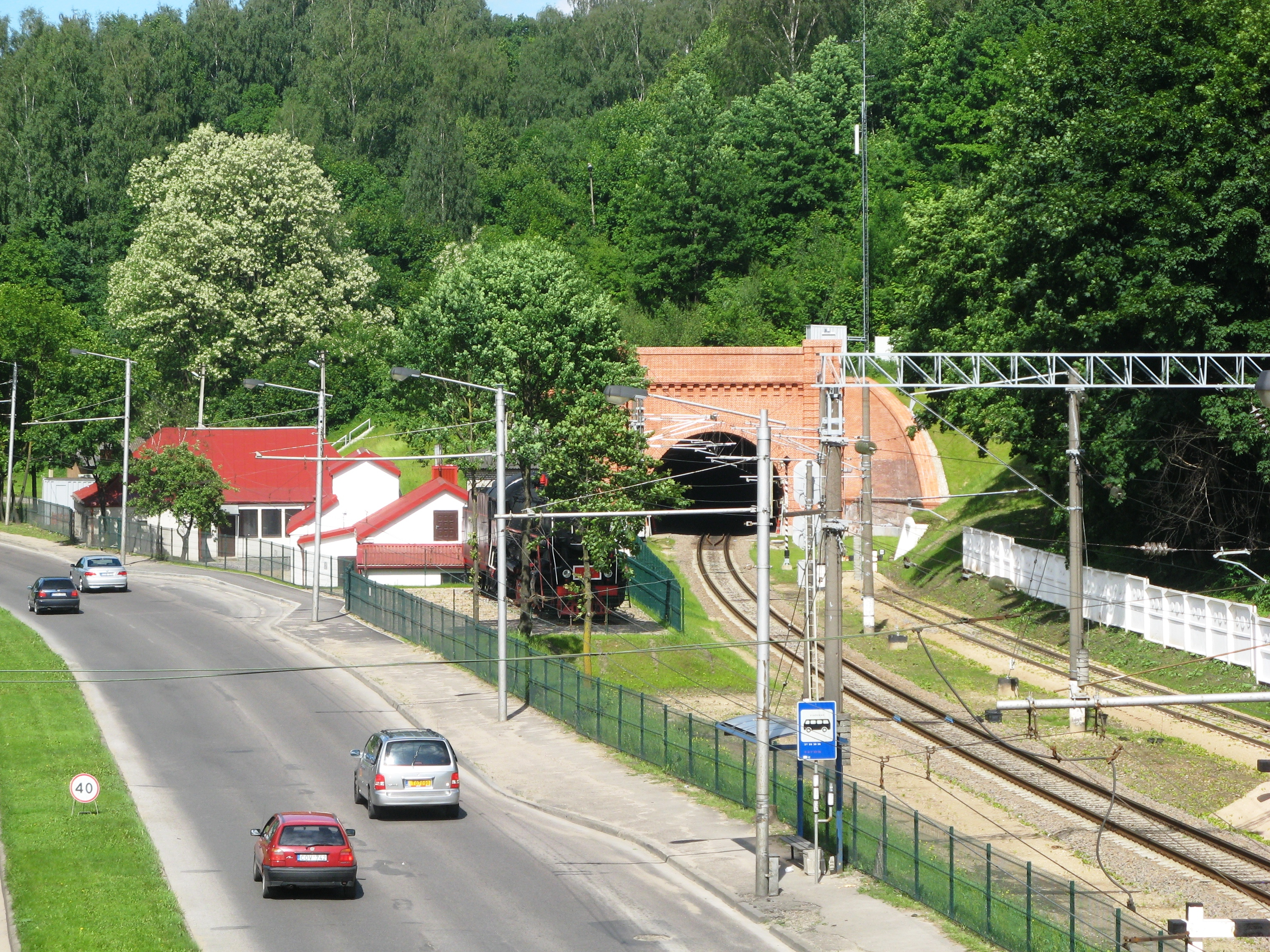
Tunnel view in 2010

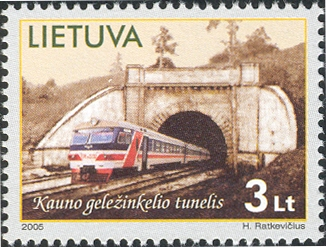
Post stamp with the tunnel

The tunnel was opened for traffic in 1862. It was on the Lentvaris - Kaunas - Virbalis branch towards Prussia, of the Saint Petersburg–Warsaw railway. The tunnel's gauge was rebuilt to standard gauge by the Germans during World War I. The Kaunas tunnel was bombed by the retreating armed forces of Germany on 30 July 1944. The biggest explosion deformed a 100-metre-long section of the tunnel. The Soviet army rebuilt the tunnel in 1,5 months later in 1944. The explosions changed the hydrological condition of the tunnel. Water began to deform the tunnel in 1947-1948. Minor reconstruction was carried out in 1949. A train accident occurred in the tunnel in 1963. It was determined to leave one rail track, instead of two in 1964. Passenger locomotives were completely replaced by electric locomotives in 1975. As the last repairs on the tunnel had only been made in 1972, railway traffic was not safe due to the existing emergency state of the tunnel, thus, the speed of the traffic was limited to 40 km/h. In 2002−2003 the Danish company Niras made adjustments to the feasibility study, and an application for European Union assistance was made in accordance with the conclusions drawn by this company. The tunnel reconstruction project was launched in 2007.

The tunnel was reconstructed between 2008 and 2009. It was closed to rail traffic on 1 February 2008 and passenger traffic from Vilnius direction through Kaunas was diverted from central Kaunas Railway Station to a small station in Petrašiūnai. Reinforced concrete was installed in its vaults and walls, its portals were rebuilt, and its drainage was improved. The reconstruction also included installing lighting in the tunnel, the provision of smoke and water sensors along with a fire alarm system connected to the central control unit. The powerful fire extinguishing system was installed during the reconstruction of the tunnel. The pipes built underneath the tunnel are immediately filled with 35 cubic metres of water which is then sprayed via special sprinklers that line the tunnel. It is complemented by an efficient hazard monitoring system. The new communication system makes it possible to call for help in case of an emergency. The tunnel was opened after major reconstruction on 17 November 2009. After the reconstruction, the speed limit of the traffic in Kaunas tunnel has been increased to 83 km/h.
