= Mindaugas Kvietkauskas =

Lithuanian politician (born 1976)

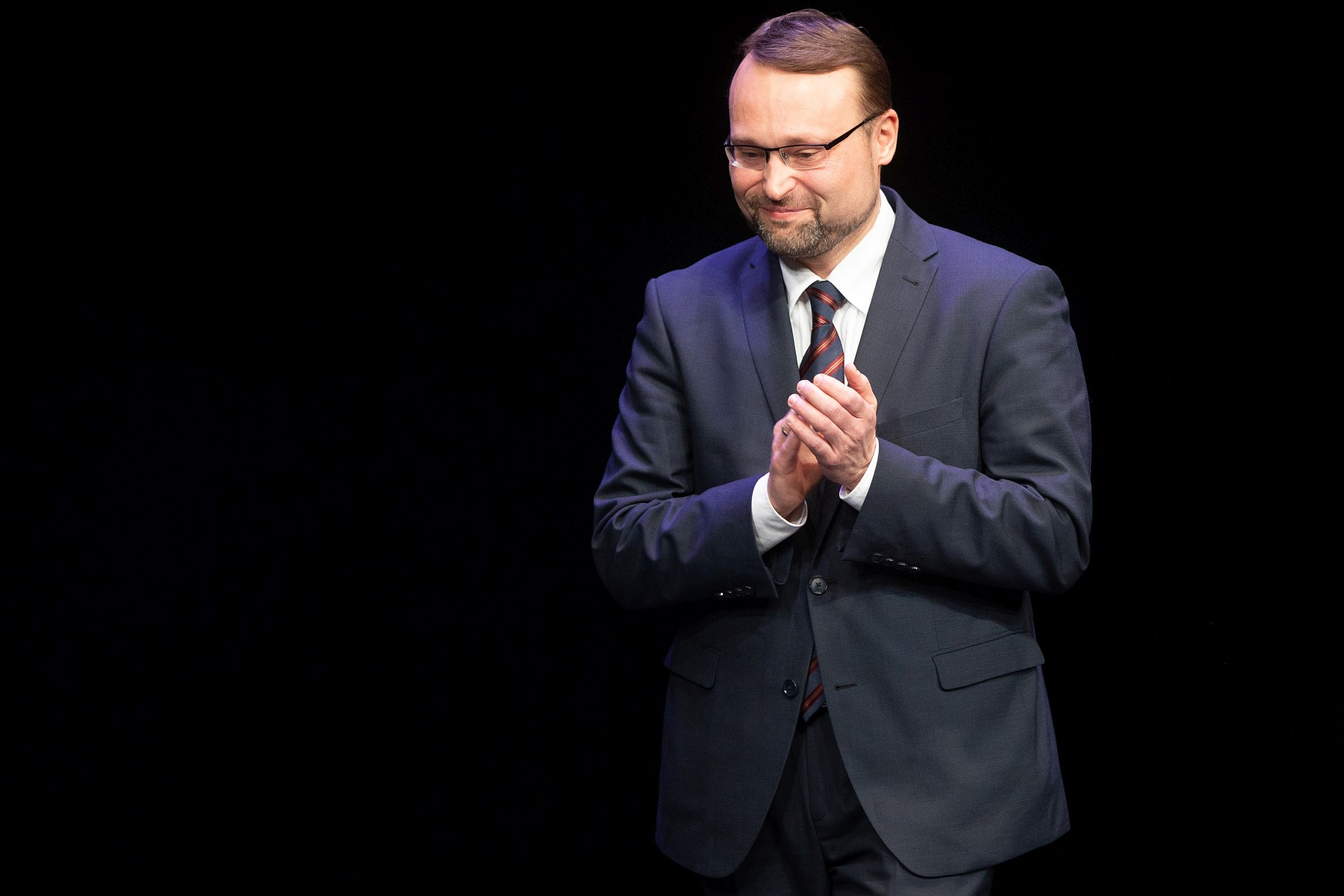

Minister of Culture
- In office 11 January 2019 – 11 December 2020
- Prime Minister: Saulius Skvernelis
- Preceded by: Liana Ruokytė-Jonsson
- Succeeded by: Simonas Kairys

Personal details
- Born: 27 May 1976 (age 49)

Mindaugas Kvietkauskas (born 27 May 1976) is a Lithuanian politician. He served as Minister of Culture in the Skvernelis Cabinet led by Prime Minister Saulius Skvernelis from 11 January 2019 to 11 December 2020.

Political offices
Preceded by Liana Ruokytė-Jonsson	Minister of Culture; 2019–2020	Succeeded by Simonas Kairys
