= Ministry of Culture (Lithuania) =

Government ministry of Lithuania

- Kultūros ministerija (in Lithuanian)

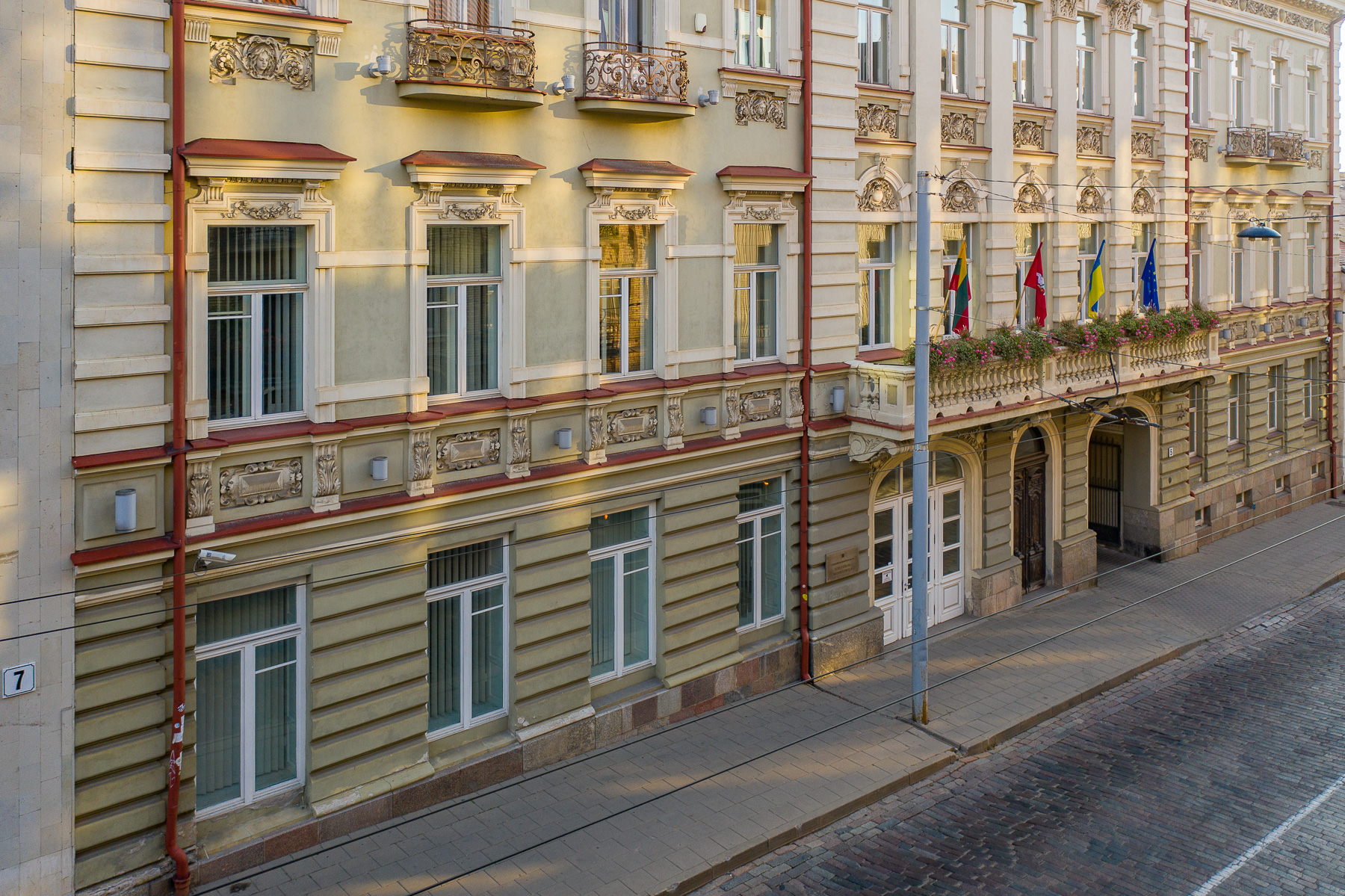

Ministry overview
- Formed: 8 June 1994; 32 years ago
- Jurisdiction: Government of Lithuania
- Headquarters: J. Basanavičiaus 5, Naujamiestis, 01118 Vilnius
- Employees: 114 permanent employees (January 2021)
- Annual budget: ▲€431 million (2024)
- Minister responsible: Vaida Aleknavičienė
- Website: lrkm.lrv.lt

Map
- 54°40′48.6″N 25°16′35.5″E

The Ministry of Culture of the Republic of Lithuania (Lithuanian: Lietuvos Respublikos kultūros ministerija) is a governmental body of the Republic of Lithuania. Its mission is to formulate and implement state cultural policies supporting professional and amateur art, theatre, music, fine arts, cinema, museums, libraries, and written publications, to guard copyright and copyright-related interests, and to protect cultural values.

== History ==
The Ministry of Culture was formally established on 8 June 1994, following the government's decision in 1993 to split it off from the Ministry of Culture and Education. Its first minister was Dainius Trinkūnas.

== Activities ==
The ministry awards prizes including Lithuanian National Prize for Culture and Arts for achievements in the arts and culture, the Martynas Mažvydas Award for scholarly research, National Jonas Basanavičius Award for outstanding achievements related to ethnicity, also awards to young creators, librarians, translators, etc.

The Top Prize of the Ministry of Culture of the Republic of Lithuania is the honorary badge "Nešk Savo Šviesą Ir Tikėk". It is an acknowledgment of many years of work in the field of culture and arts, of creativity and its promotion.

Prizes of the Ministry of Culture for the most significant international awards in the field of culture were launched in 2019. Among the first laureates are the group of opera Sun & Sea (Marina) creators Rugilė Barzdžiukaitė, Vaiva Grainytė, and Lina Lapelytė together with curators Rasa Antanavičiūtė and Lucia Pietrouisti, as well as the group of the documentary Bridges of Time creators and operatic soprano Asmik Grigorian.

== Departments ==
The Department of Cultural Heritage is the department of the ministry responsible for protecting and documenting cultural property and maintaining historical preservation.

== Functions ==
The Ministry of Culture performs the following functions within the framework of Lithuanian legislation:

- Drafting legislation on cultural activities;
- Drafting concepts and programs supporting the development of various forms of art, and coordinating their implementation;
- Allocating funds to museums, libraries, and organizations that support visual, musical, and performance arts
- Coordinating activities on behalf of copyright and related rights;
- Coordinating state public information policy;
- Assuring the accounting of, and protection of, cultural values;
- Development and implementing international cultural programs, and drafting international agreements pertaining to these programs;
- Initiating regional cultural development strategies.

== Ministers ==
Christian Democratic Party Democratic Labour Party Labour Party Liberal and Centre Union Liberal Movement Liberal Union National Resurrection Party Social Democratic Party Independent

Part of Ministry of Education and Culture from 17 January 1990 to 31 March 1993
Ministry of Culture
Term	Minister	Party	Cabinet	Office		
Term	Minister	Party	Cabinet	Start date	End date	Time in office
1	Dainius Trinkūnas (1931-1996)	Democratic Labour Party	Šleževičius	31 March 1993	15 November 1994	1 year, 229 days
2	Juozas Nekrošius (1935-2020)	Democratic Labour Party	Šleževičius	15 November 1994	19 March 1996	1 year, 125 days
3	Juozas Nekrošius (1935-2020)	Democratic Labour Party	Stankevičius	19 March 1996	10 December 1996	266 days
4	Saulius Šaltenis (born 1945)	Christian Democratic Party	Vagnorius	10 December 1996	10 June 1999	2 years, 182 days
5	Arūnas Bėkšta (born 1955)	Independent	Paksas	10 June 1999	11 November 1999	154 days
6	Arūnas Bėkšta (born 1955)	Independent	Kubilius	11 November 1999	9 November 2000	364 days
7	Gintautas Kėvišas (born 1954)	Liberal Union	Paksas	9 November 2000	12 July 2001	245 days
8	Roma Dovydėnienė (born 1956)	Social Democratic Party	Brazauskas	12 July 2001	14 December 2004	3 years, 155 days
9	Vladimiras Prudnikovas (born 1949)	Labour Party	Brazauskas	14 December 2004	18 July 2006	1 year, 216 days
10	Jonas Jučas (born 1952)	Liberal and Centre Union	Kirkilas	18 July 2006	9 December 2008	2 years, 144 days
11	Remigijus Vilkaitis (born 1950)	National Resurrection Party	Kubilius	9 December 2008	1 July 2010	1 year, 204 days
12	Arūnas Gelūnas (born 1968)	Independent	Kubilius	1 July 2010	13 December 2012	2 years, 165 days
13	Šarūnas Birutis (born 1961)	Labour Party	Butkevičius	13 December 2012	13 December 2016	4 years, 0 days
14	Liana Ruokytė-Jonsson (born 1966)	Independent	Skvernelis	13 December 2016	21 December 2018	2 years, 8 days
15	Mindaugas Kvietkauskas (born 1976)	Independent	Skvernelis	21 December 2018	11 December 2020	1 year, 356 days
16	Simonas Kairys (born 1984)	Liberal Movement	Šimonytė	11 December 2020	Incumbent	5 years, 240 days
