= Panevėžys Combined Heat and Power Plant =

Gas-fired power plant in Panevėžys, Lithuania

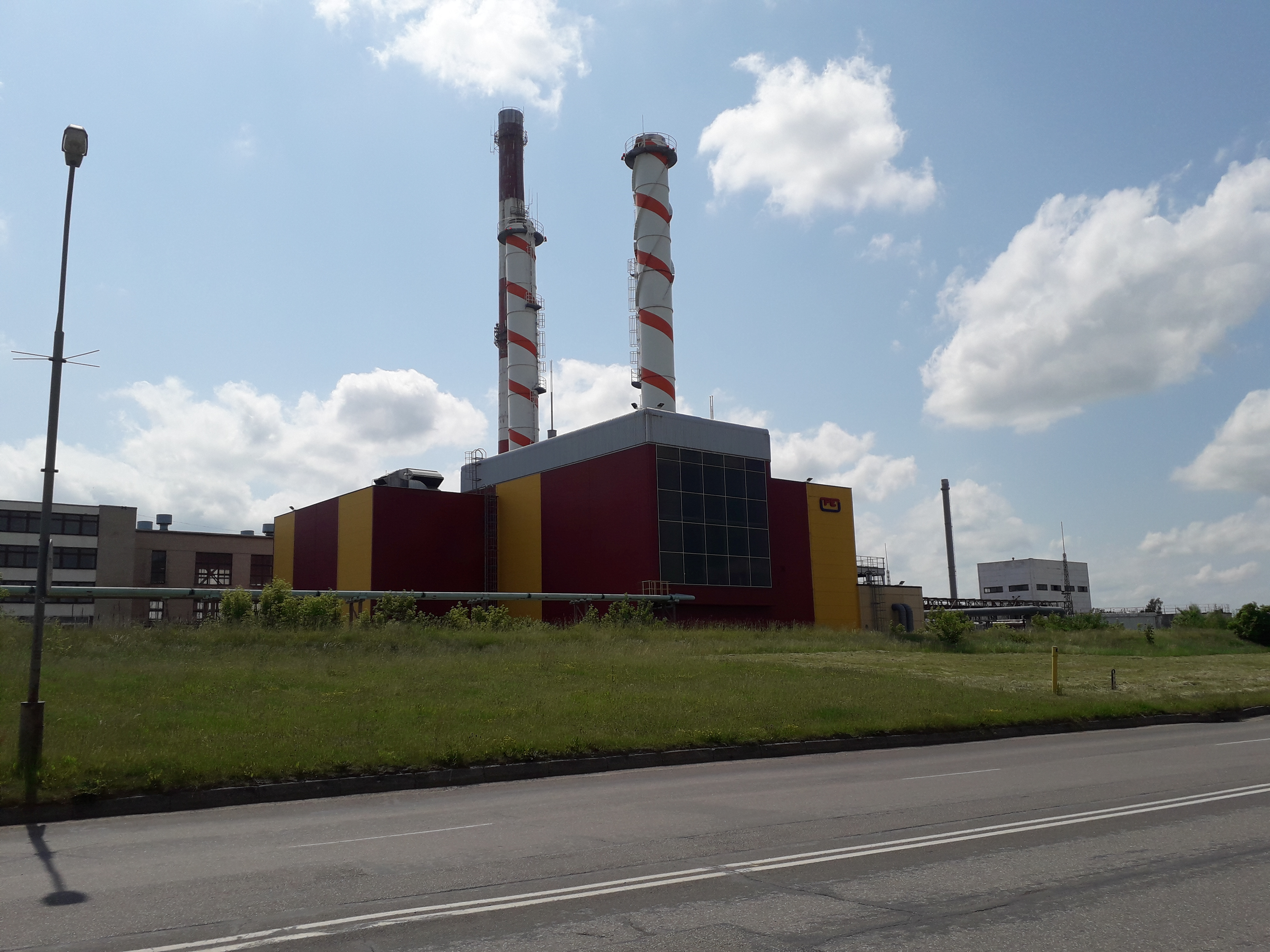
- Official name: Panevėžio termofikacinė elektrinė
- Country: Lithuania
- Location: Panevėžys
- Coordinates: 55°44′50″N 24°23′11″E
- Status: Operational
- Construction began: 2006
- Commission date: 2008; 18 years ago
- Construction cost: 130+ mil. LTL
- Operator: Panevėžio Energija

Thermal power station
- Primary fuel: Natural gases

Power generation
- Annual net output: 235 GWh (power); 230 GWh (heat)

Panevėžys Combined Heat and Power Plant is a natural gas-fired power plant in Panevėžys, Lithuania.

== See also ==
- List of power stations in Lithuania
