= Achema Power Plant =

Power station in Lithuania

- Official name: Achemos elektrinė
- Country: Lithuania
- Location: Jonava
- Coordinates: 55°4′51″N 24°20′9″E
- Status: Operational
- Operator: Achema

Thermal power station
- Primary fuel: Natural gas

Power generation
- Nameplate capacity: 75 MW

Achema Power Plant is a natural gas-fired power plant in Jonava, Lithuania. Its primary use is to serve Achema factory.

The first cogeneration power plant was built in 2006, second in 2011. As of 2014 Achema Power Plant had installed capacity of 75 MW.

== See also ==
- List of power stations in Lithuania
