= Šarūnas Birutis =

Lithuanian politician

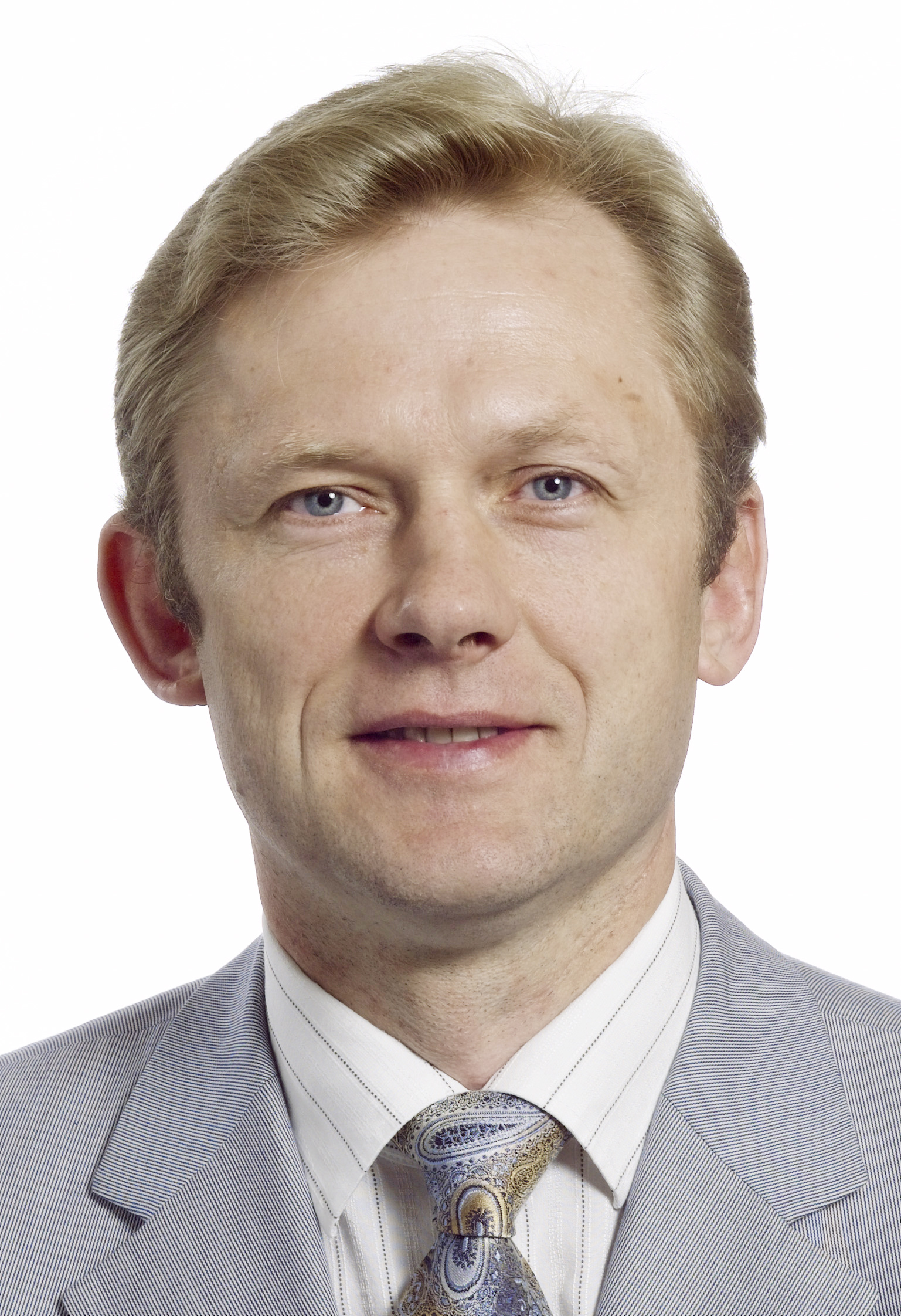

Minister of Culture
- In office 12 December 2024 – 25 September 2025
- Prime Minister: Gintautas Paluckas; Rimantas Šadžius (acting)
- Preceded by: Simonas Kairys
- Succeeded by: Ignotas Adomavičius
- In office 13 December 2012 – 13 December 2016
- Prime Minister: Algirdas Butkevičius
- Preceded by: Arūnas Gelūnas
- Succeeded by: Liana Ruokytė Jonsson

Member of European Parliament for Lithuania
- In office 2004–2009

Personal details
- Born: 20 September 1961 (age 64) Šiauliai, Lithuania
- Party: Labour Party

Šarūnas Birutis (born September 20, 1961, in Šiauliai) is a Lithuanian politician. He was the Lithuanian minister of culture in the Gintautas Paluckas-led government since 2024. He earlier served as a member of the European Parliament from 2004 to 2009, and was part of the Alliance of Liberals and Democrats for Europe.

== Early life ==
Šarūnas Birutis was born on 20 September 1961 in Šiauliai in Šiauliai county. He completed his schooling from J. Janonis Secondary School in Šiauliai in 1979. In 1984, he received a bachelor's degree in economics from Vilnius University. In 2003, he obtained a master's degree in law from Law University of Lithuania in 2003.

== Career ==
=== Business ===
While studying for his degree in economics, he worked in the finance division in the state academic drama theatre from 1982 to 1984. After his studies, he was employed by the Kaunas Combined Heat and Power Plant in the planning division in 1984. In 1986, he joined the administration of Kaunas city committee in a finance supervisory role. After working there till 1990, he ventured into private business, and established the Lithuanian Writers Union Publishing House. During the time, he also worked on establishing the tourism industry in Lithuania. He also served as the president of the Baltic-Indian Chambers of Commerce and the vice-president of the Lithuanian-Indian Forum.

=== Politics ===
In 1999, Birutis joined the Ministry of Economy as the head of the small and medium business division. He served as the representative of the Lithuanian Union of Industrial Employers from 2002 to 2003. He was appointed as the ember of the State Commission on Gambling Supervision by the prime minister in 2003. He was part of the delegation that negotiated for the accession of Lithuania into the European Union. In 2004, he was elected to the European Parliament, where he was part of the Alliance of Liberals and Democrats for Europe. He joined the Committee on Industry, Research and Energy and Committee on Internal Market and Consumer Protection, and was a member of the European Energy Forum.

Birutis served as a member of the Vilnius City Council from 2011 to 2012. He was elected to the Parliament of Lithuania in the held in the 2012 Lithuanian parliamentary election as a member of the Lithuanian Social Democratic Party. He was a member of the Committees on foreign affairs, European affairs, human rights, and anti-corruption. He was appointed as the Minister of Culture on 13 December 2012. He served as a member of the parliament till 2016. In 2024, he was re-elected to the parliament, and was re-appointed as the minister of culture.

On 9 June 2025, Minister Birutis announced that the Lithuanian government intends to allocate funds in the next fiscal year for the relocation of Soviet-era soldier remains currently situated in city centers, pending approval of formal procedures and budget inclusion.
