= Klaipėda Combined Heat and Power Plant =

Gren Klaipėda Combined Heat and Power Plant
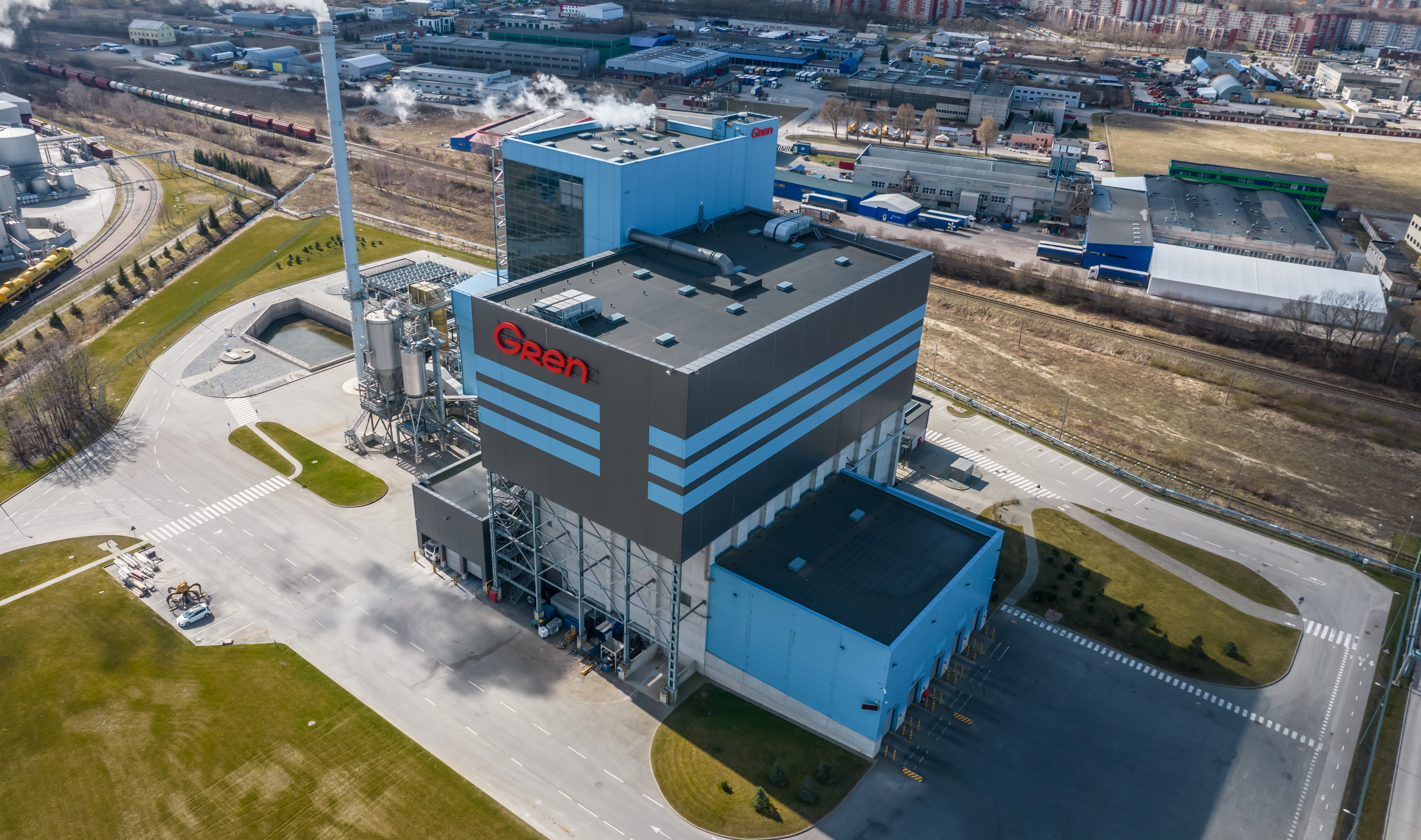
- Official name: Gren Klaipėda termofikacinė elektrinė
- Country: Lithuania
- Location: Klaipėda
- Coordinates: 55°41′2″N 21°12′1.67″E
- Status: Operational
- Construction began: 2011
- Commission date: 2013
- Construction cost: 126 mil. EUR
- Operator: Fortum Heat Lietuva

Thermal power station
- Primary fuel: Biomass

Power generation
- Nameplate capacity: 20 MW
- Annual net output: 140 GWh (power); 400 GWh (heat)

External links
- Website: gren.com/lt

Gren Klaipėda, formerly Fortum Klaipėda, is combined heat and power plant in Klaipėda, Lithuania and it uses biomass and waste to produce energy. Originally built in Klaipėda Free Economic Zone by Fortum Heat Lithuania which belongs to Finnish energy company Fortum.

Lithuanian president Dalia Grybauskaitė and Finnish president Sauli Niinistö both participated in the opening ceremony of the plant in 2013.

== See also ==
- List of power stations in Lithuania
