= Simonas Kairys =

Lithuanian politician

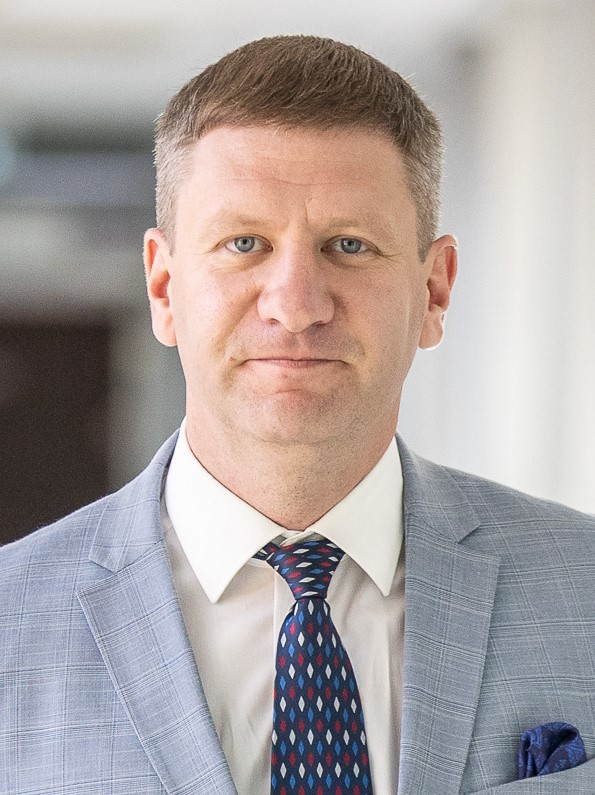

Minister of Culture
- In office 11 December 2020 – 12 December 2024
- Prime Minister: Ingrida Šimonytė
- Preceded by: Mindaugas Kvietkauskas
- Succeeded by: Šarūnas Birutis

Deputy Mayor of Kaunas
- In office 2015–2019

Kaunas City Councillor
- In office 2011–2019

Personal details
- Born: 19 April 1984 (age 42) Telšiai, Lithuania
- Party: Liberal Movement
- Spouse: Deimantė Kairienė
- Education: Vytautas Magnus University; Mykolas Romeris University

Simonas Kairys (born 19 April 1984) is a Lithuanian politician, former Deputy Mayor of Kaunas and Kaunas City Councillor.

On 7 December 2020, he was approved to be the as Minister of Culture in the Šimonytė Cabinet.

== Biography ==
He was born and raised in Telšiai, where he graduated from high school in 2003. In 2007 graduated from Vytautas Magnus University with a bachelor's degree in political sciences. In 2011, he obtained a master's degree in law at Mykolas Romeris University.

== Political career ==
Since 2008 is a Member of Liberal Movement.

Between 2007 and 2011 he worked as an Assistant of the Deputy Mayor of Kaunas, project manager of the Institute of Liberal Thought.

From 2011 to 2019 he was elected a member of Kaunas City Councillor.

Since 2015 until 2019 Kairys worked as the Deputy Mayor of Kaunas.

From 2019 he is Advisor of the Mayor of Kaunas.

== Sources ==
- Rezultatai - vrk.lt
- Simonas Kairys

Political offices
Preceded by Mindaugas Kvietkauskas	Minister of Culture; 2020–present	Incumbent
