= Vilnius Heat Plant =

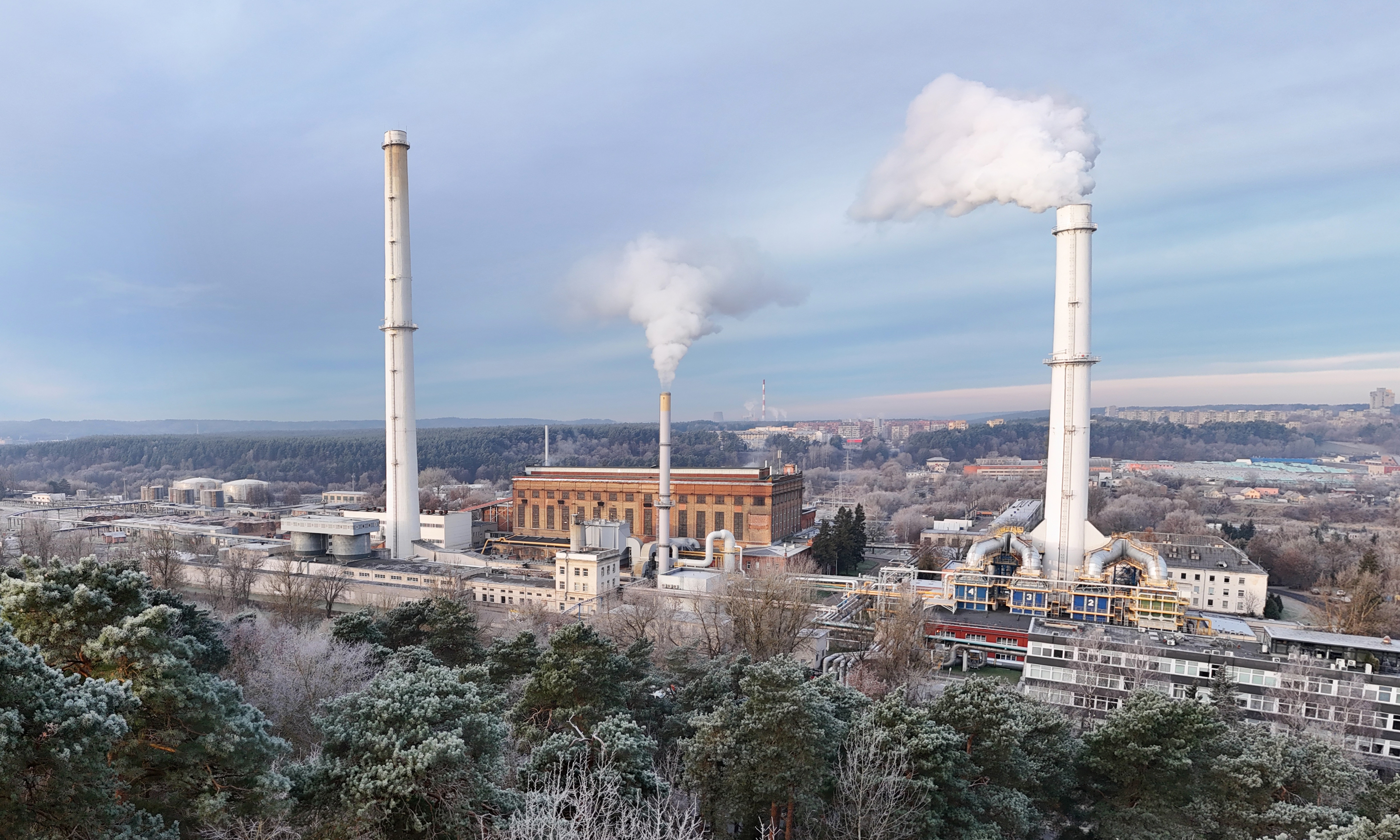
- Vilnius Heat Plant in 2025
- Official name: Vilniaus termofikacinė elektrinė Nr. 2
- Country: Lithuania
- Location: Vilnius
- Coordinates: 54°39′49″N 25°13′54″E
- Status: Operational
- Construction began: 1948
- Commission date: 1951
- Operator: Vilniaus Energija UAB

Thermal power station
- Primary fuel: Natural gas
- Secondary fuel: Mazut
- Cogeneration?: Yes
- Thermal capacity: 913 MW

Power generation
- Nameplate capacity: 24 MW

External links
- Commons: Related media on Commons

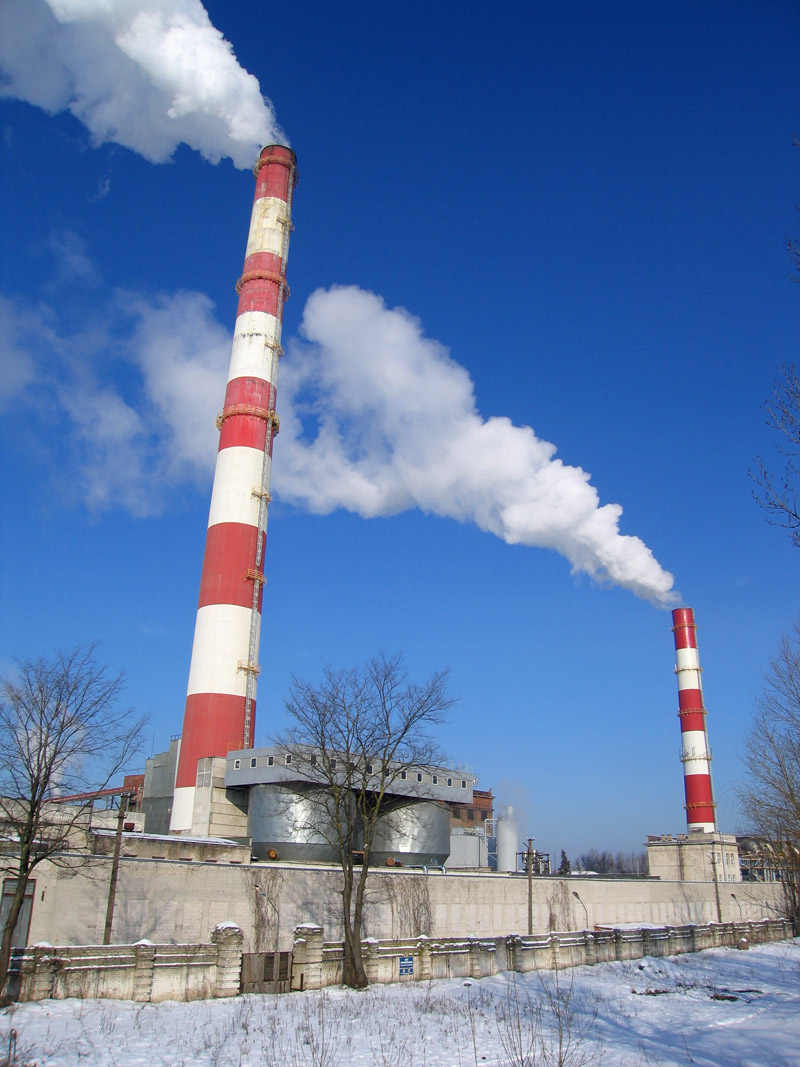

Vilnius Heat Plant or Vilnius Power Plant-2 is a power plant in Vilnius, Lithuania. Its capacity is 913 megawatts (MW) heating power and 24 MW electric power. It is operated by Vilniaus Energija UAB, a subsidiary of Dalkia.

The power plant is fueled by natural gas and heavy fuel oil (mazut). There is a plan to transfer it to biofuel based on a mixture of wood, straw and peat.

== See also ==
- List of power stations in Lithuania
