= Remigijus Vilkaitis =

Lithuanian actor and politician

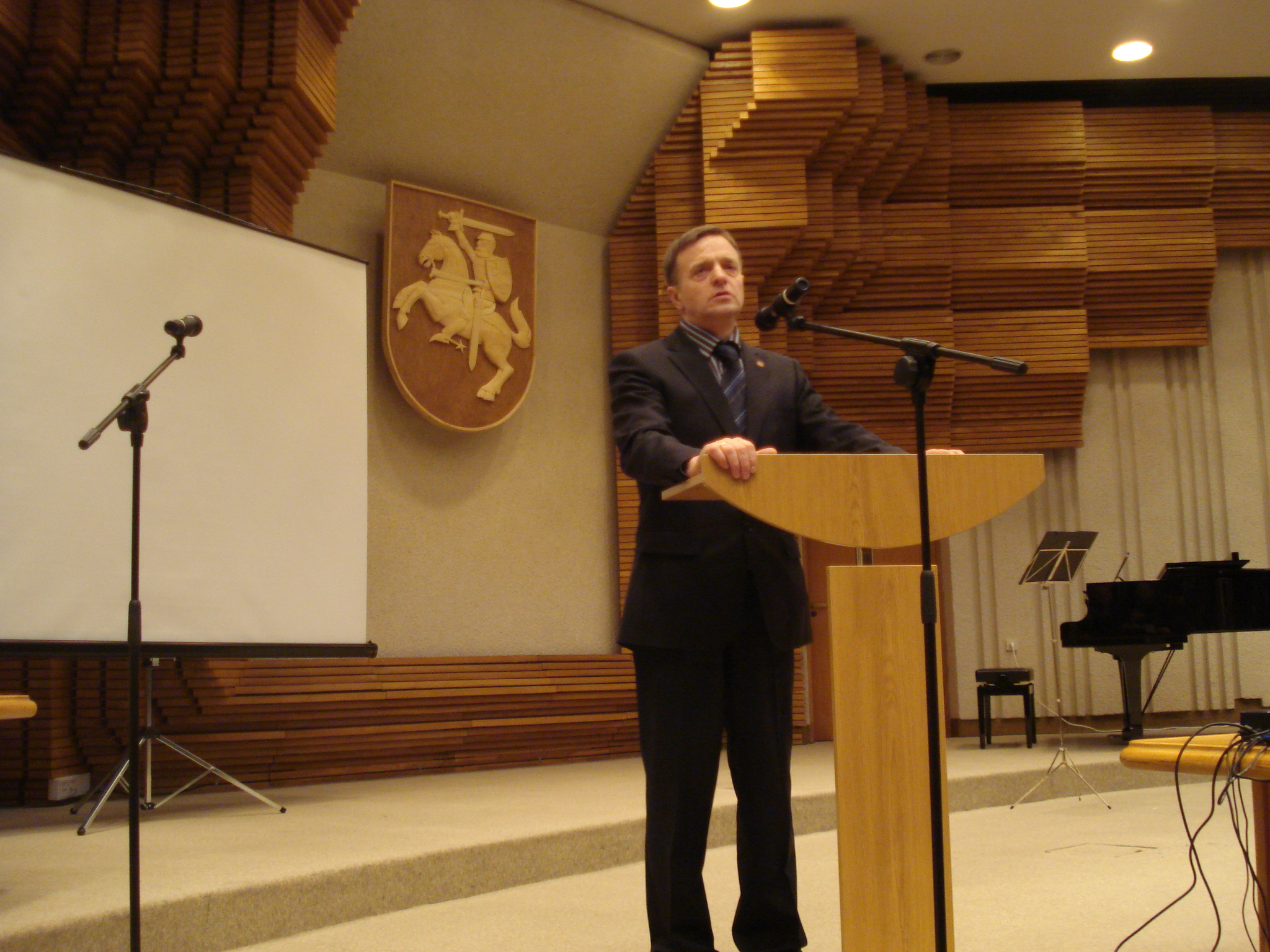
Remigijus Vilkaitis

Remigijus Vilkaitis (born 1950) is a Lithuanian actor and former Minister of Culture of Lithuania.

Since 1975 he has worked at the Vilnius State Youth Theatre. He has participated in performances in US, Australia, Colombia and many European countries. He has conducted and played in more than 10 TV programs and performances and has produced theatre and radio plays. Vilkaitis is also author of two fiction books.

From 2008 to 2010 Vilkaitis was elected as Lithuania's Minister of Culture.
