= Šiauliai Biomass Power Plant =

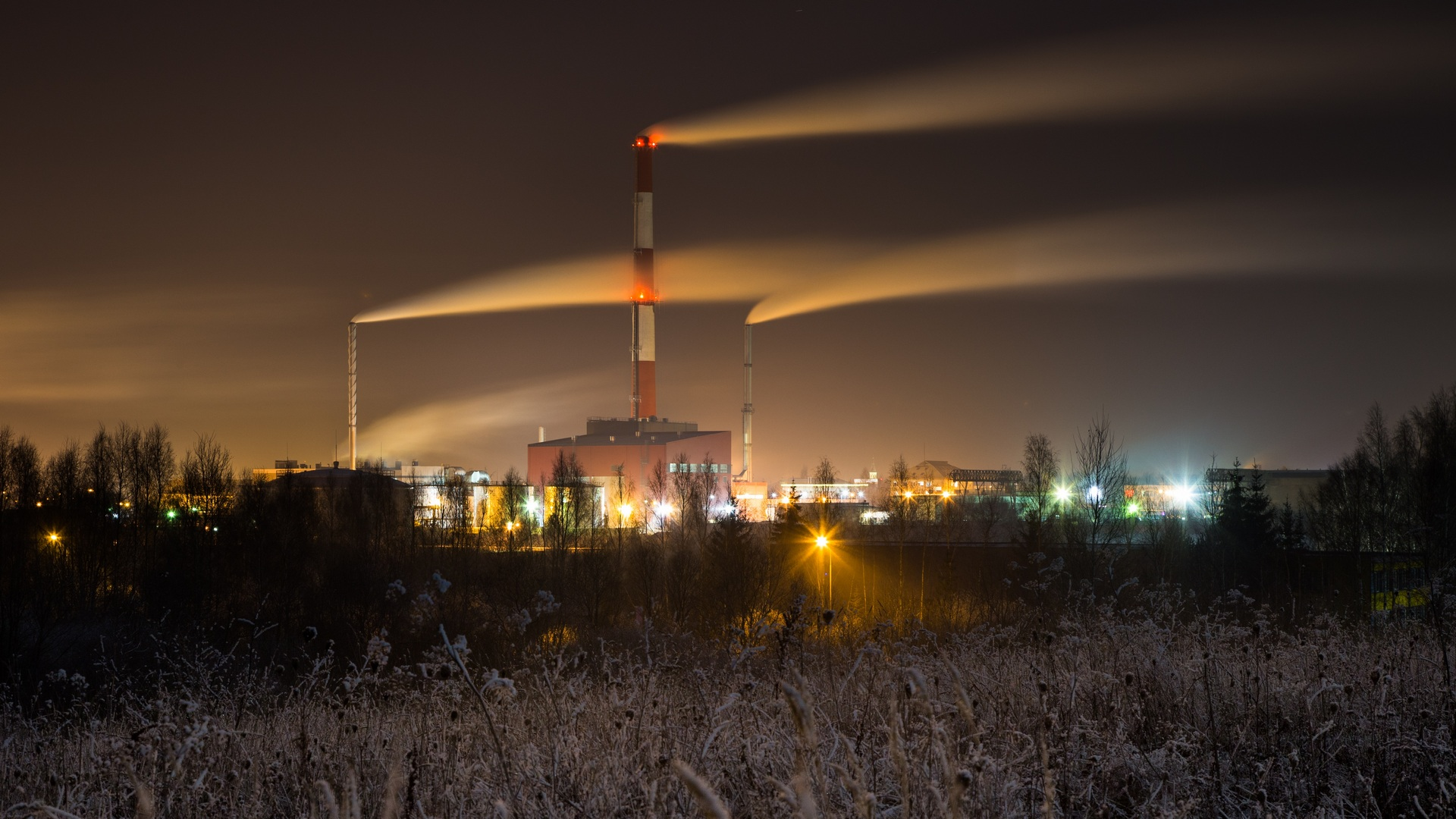
- Country: Lithuania
- Location: Šiauliai
- Coordinates: 55°54′40″N 23°18′44″E
- Status: Operational
- Construction began: 2011
- Commission date: 2012
- Operator: Šiaulių energija

Thermal power station
- Primary fuel: Wood chips
- Cogeneration?: Yes
- Thermal capacity: 40 MW

Power generation
- Nameplate capacity: 11 MW

External links
- Commons: Related media on Commons

The Šiauliai Biomass Power Plant is a biomass combined heat and power plant in Šiauliai, Lithuania. It supplies heat to almost half of Šiauliai and creates 11 MW of electric energy.

Construction started in 2011 and finished in 2012. On 19 July 2012 Power Plant started to work.

== See also ==
- List of power stations in Lithuania
