= Mažeikiai Power Plant =

Gas-fired power plant in Mažeikiai, Lithuania

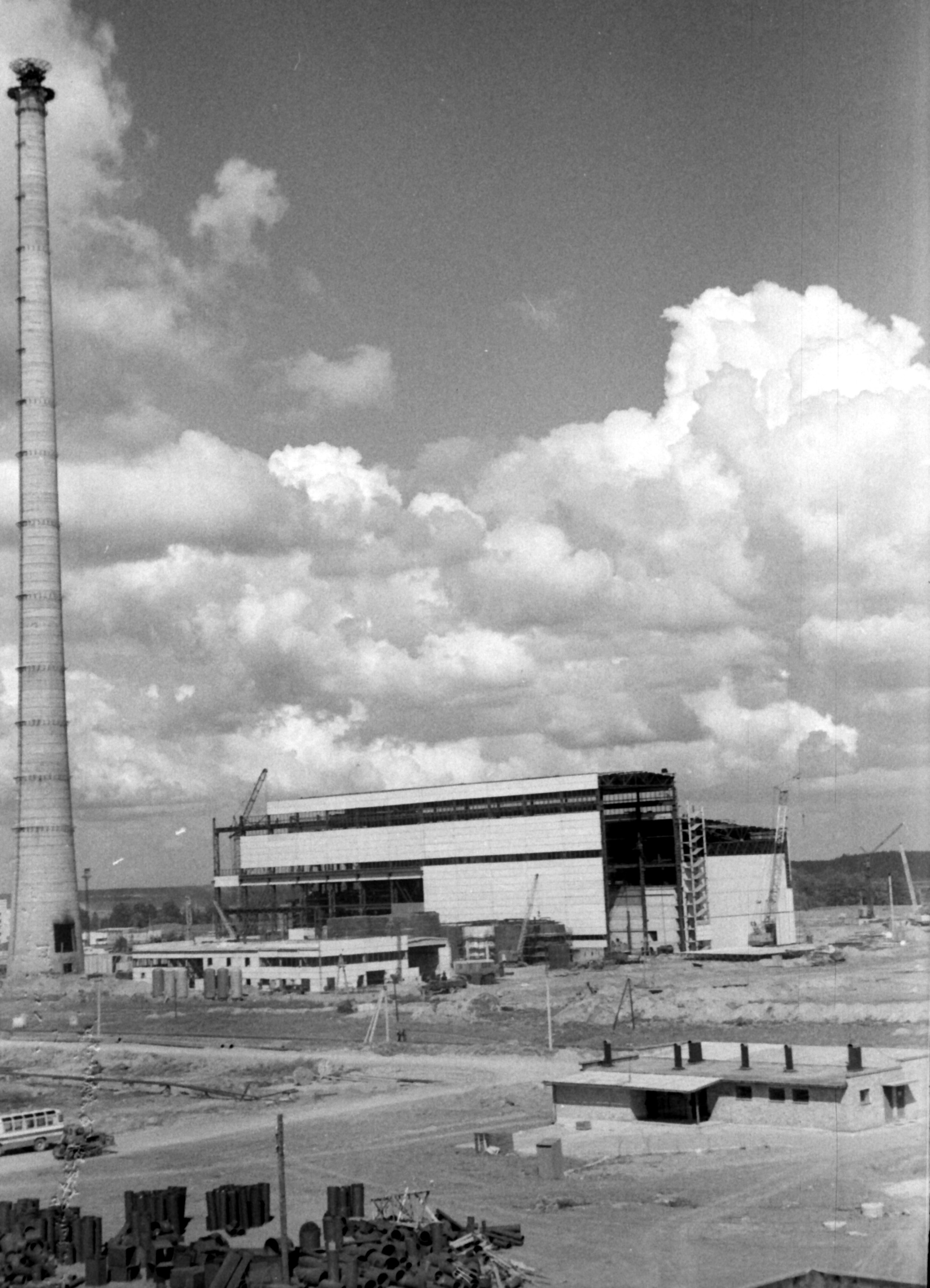
- Official name: Mažeikių elektrinė
- Country: Lithuania
- Location: Mažeikiai
- Coordinates: 56°23′03″N 22°11′03″E
- Status: Operational
- Operator: ORLEN Lietuva

Thermal power station
- Primary fuel: Natural gas
- Secondary fuel: Mazut

Power generation
- Nameplate capacity: 160 MW

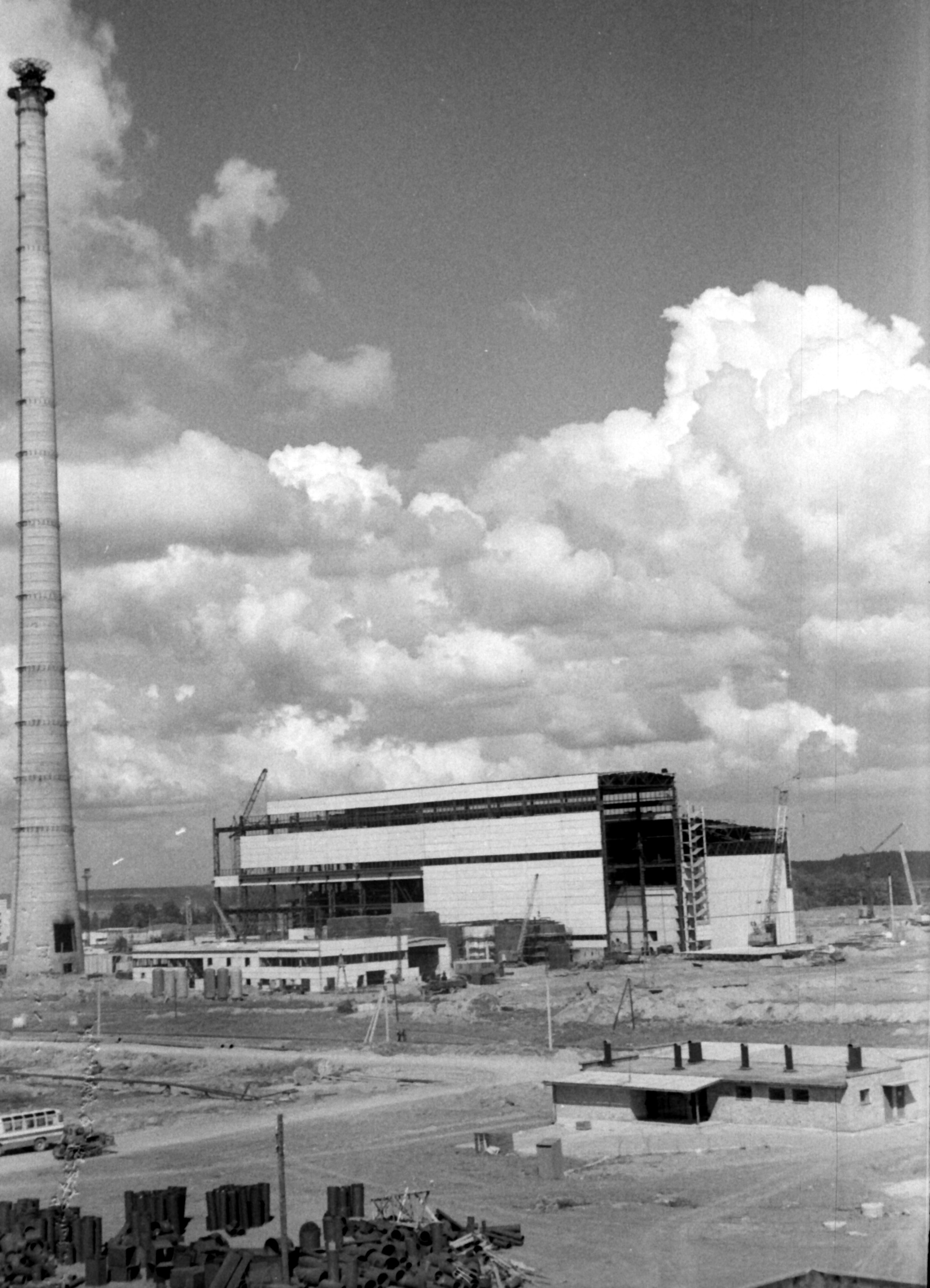

Mažeikiai Power Plant is a natural gas-fired power plant in Mažeikiai, Lithuania. Its primary use is to serve oil refinery ORLEN Lietuva.

== See also ==
- List of power stations in Lithuania
