= Liana Ruokytė-Jonsson =

Lithuanian politician

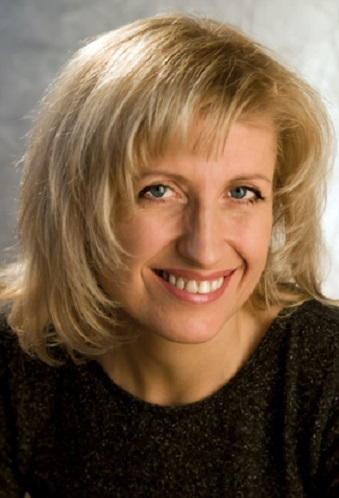

Minister of Culture
- In office 13 December 2016 – 21 December 2018
- Prime Minister: Saulius Skvernelis
- Preceded by: Šarūnas Birutis
- Succeeded by: Mindaugas Kvietkauskas

Personal details
- Born: 1966 (age 59–60)

Liana Ruokytė-Jonsson (born 1966) is a Lithuanian politician. From 13 December 2016 to 21 December 2018, she served as Minister of Culture in the Skvernelis Cabinet led by Prime Minister Saulius Skvernelis.

Political offices
| Preceded by Šarūnas Birutis | Minister of Culture; 2016–2018 | Succeeded by Mindaugas Kvietkauskas |
