= Klaipėda Geothermal Demonstration Plant =

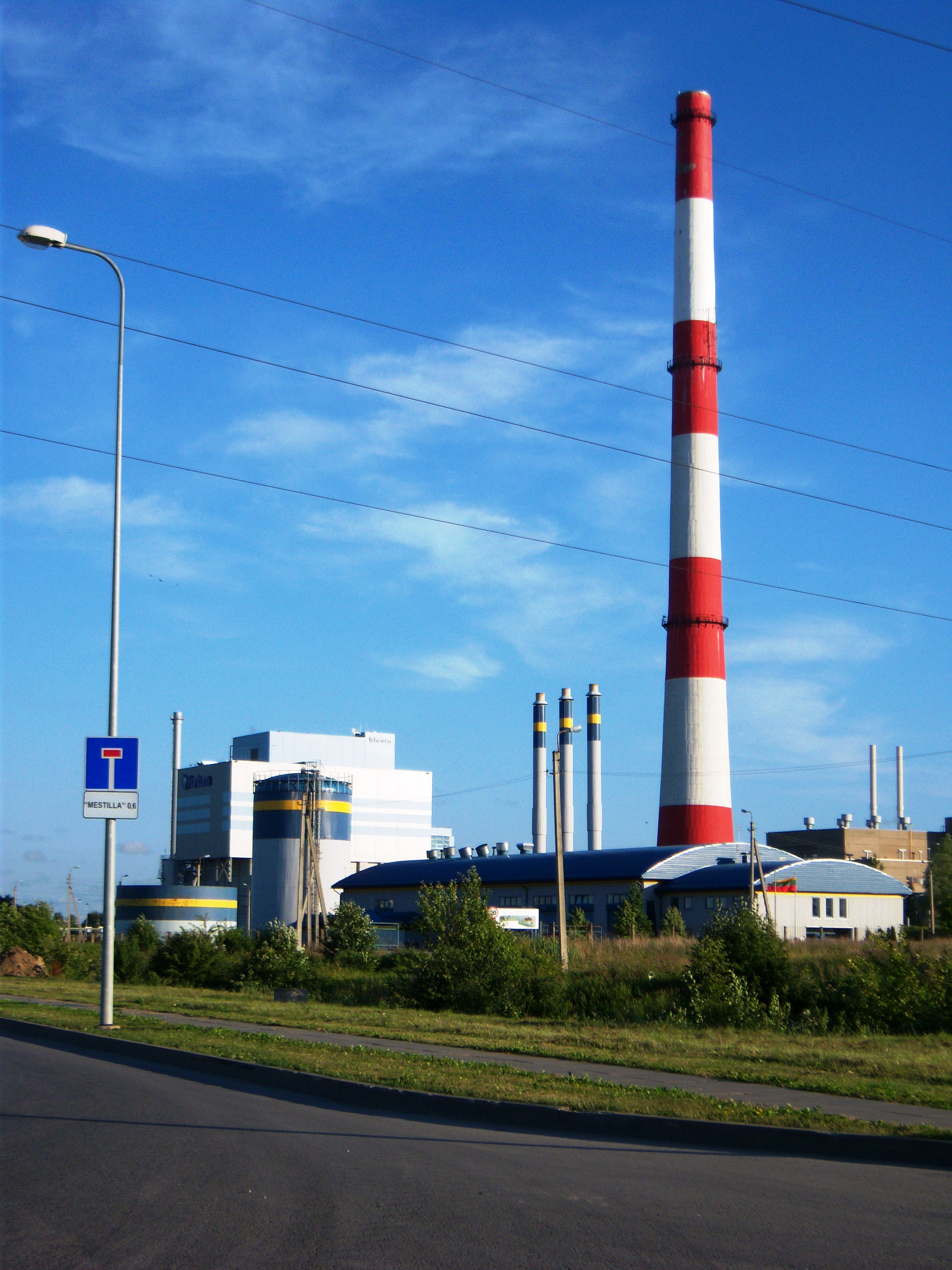
- Country: Lithuania
- Location: Klaipėda
- Coordinates: 55°41′2″N 21°12′4″E
- Status: Decommissioned

Geothermal power station
- Min. source temp.: 38 °C (100 °F)
- Wells: 1
- Max. well depth: 1,100 m (3,600 ft)
- Thermal capacity: 35 MWt

External links
- Website: Geoterma

The Klaipėda Geothermal Demonstration Plant is a geothermal heating plant in Klaipėda, Lithuania, constructed during the late 1990s and early 2000s. It was the first geothermal heating plant in the Baltic Sea region. Its purpose was to reduce carbon dioxide, sulfur dioxide, nitrogen oxide, and particulate emissions in the area, as well as to reduce Lithuania's dependence on foreign energy sources. The plant supplies district heating to the city. Construction was financed by a loan from the World Bank (US$5.9 million) and a grant from the Global Environment Facility (US$6.9 million). The Danish state company Dansk Olie og Naturgas (now Ørsted) provided technical support, and Enterprise Geoterma served as the implementing agency. The total cost of the plant was US$19.5 million. Since 2017 it has been closed due to financial and technical issues and the operating company Geoterma filled for bankruptcy and was liquidated in 2019.

== Background ==
After declaring independence from the Soviet Union, the Baltic States of Lithuania and Latvia were left with an energy sector that was heavily reliant on imported gas, oil, and nuclear fuel sources. In 1996, when the plant project was appraised, domestic energy sources supplied only 2% of Lithuania's heat demand. The states began considering renewable energy projects in response. Between 1992 and 1994 the Government of Denmark financed a study of the geothermal potential in Lithuania and Latvia called Baltic Geothermal Energy Project. Regional aquifers within the Devonian and Cambrian strata were analyzed along with the energy needs and geothermal potential of 12 urban areas: Klaipėda, Palanga, Šiauliai, Šilalė, Šilutė, Gargždai, Radviliškis, and Joniškis in Lithuania, and Liepāja, Riga, Jūrmala, and Jelgava in Latvia. On the basis of this project's findings and other investigations, Klaipėda was chosen as a pilot location. The World Bank had estimated the plant would reduce annual emissions of carbon dioxide (CO_{2}) by 47,800 tons and nitrogen oxides (NO_{X}) by 1 ton if it replaced natural gas as a fuel, and reduce CO_{2} emissions by 51,940 tons, NO_{X} by 11 tons, and sulfur dioxides by 1,160 tons per year if it additionally replaced heavy fuel oil. According to this estimate, the plant would satisfy about 10% of the city's heat demand.

== Plant design and operation ==
The potential for geothermal heating using the source aquifer arises from the Gotland tectonic belt and Polotsk–Kurzeme fault belt interface in the area, which generates thermal anomalies.

The plant uses 38 °C (100 °F) water from a well drilled into a Devonian aquifer about 1,100 metres (3,600 ft) beneath the surface. The heat is extracted using an absorption heat pump, and circulates in a closed loop. It then contributes to the existing district heating system.

During its construction, difficulties arose when gypsum clogged the well's filters, but these problems were overcome, and in 2004 the State Commission confirmed a plant capacity of 35 MWt, of which geothermal constituted 13.6 MWt. 103,000 MWh of heat were produced in 2001, increasing to 215,000 MWh in 2003.

Enterprise Geoterma experienced financial difficulties, coming close to bankruptcy in 2007. The company planned to reconstruct the plant during 2008, possibly adding electrical generating capacity.

Annual production rose from 100 MW_{th} in 2001 to its maximum of 230 MW_{th}, before decreasing to 10 MW_{th} in 2008. It increased to 120 MW_{th} in 2010, then decreased gradually before the plant was shut down in 2017 due to an unfavourable economic environment and problems with injection of used geothermal water. The planned reconstruction of the geothermal plant was seen as the only way to solve the injection problems and restart the plant operation although recent works has shown that poor injector well design was more likely the root cause and that remediation could be easier and cheaper than previously thought. Proposed changes to make the plant economically viable again include drilling a deeper well to access hotter water, modernise the pumps and replace the gas boilers with low-grade biofuel ones.

== See also ==
- List of power stations in Lithuania
