= Railway Bridge, Kaunas =

Bridge in Kaunas, Lithuania

Coordinates: 54°52′53″N 23°55′30″E

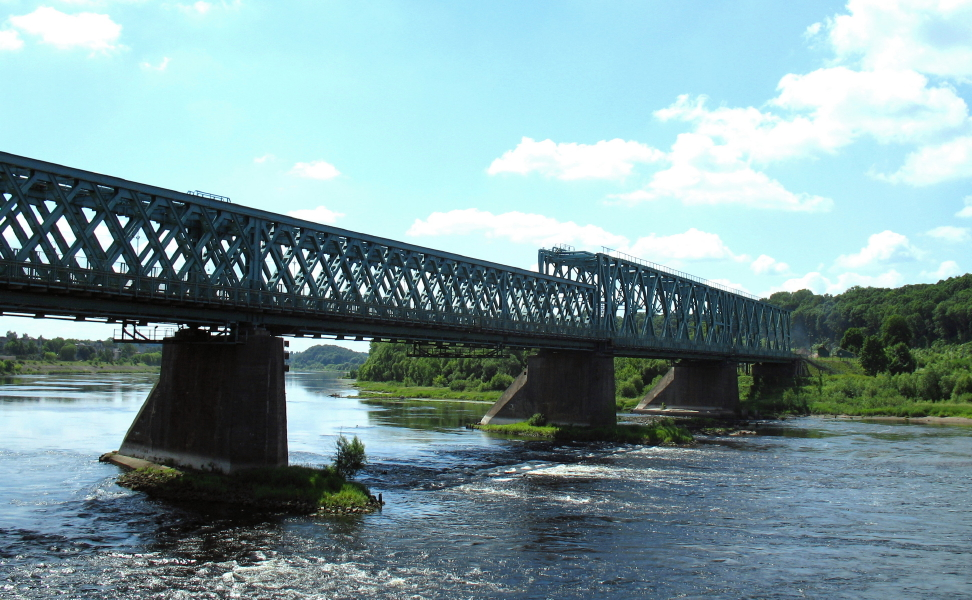
Railway Bridge

Railway Bridge in Kaunas crosses Nemunas river to connect Central Kaunas and lower Freda of Aleksotas district. Because of its green paint, it is often called Green (Lithuanian: Žaliasis). Construction of the bridge started in 1859 and ended in 1862. The usage of the bridge started on the 4 February 1862. Together with central Kaunas Railway Station and Kaunas Railway Tunnel, it forms an important Kaunas railway hub in Lithuania. However, during World War I parts of the bridge were destroyed, but soon afterwards were rebuilt as well as the standard gauge was laid by Germans during World War I. Paul von Hindenburg was among the guests who participated in the opening ceremony of the reconstructed bridge. During World War II, the bridge was blown up several times, but was rebuilt later. Kaunas Railway Bridge was included into the Registry of Immovable Cultural Heritage Sites of the Republic of Lithuania in 1996.
