= Petrašiūnai =

Coordinates: 54°53′N 24°00′E

- Eldership
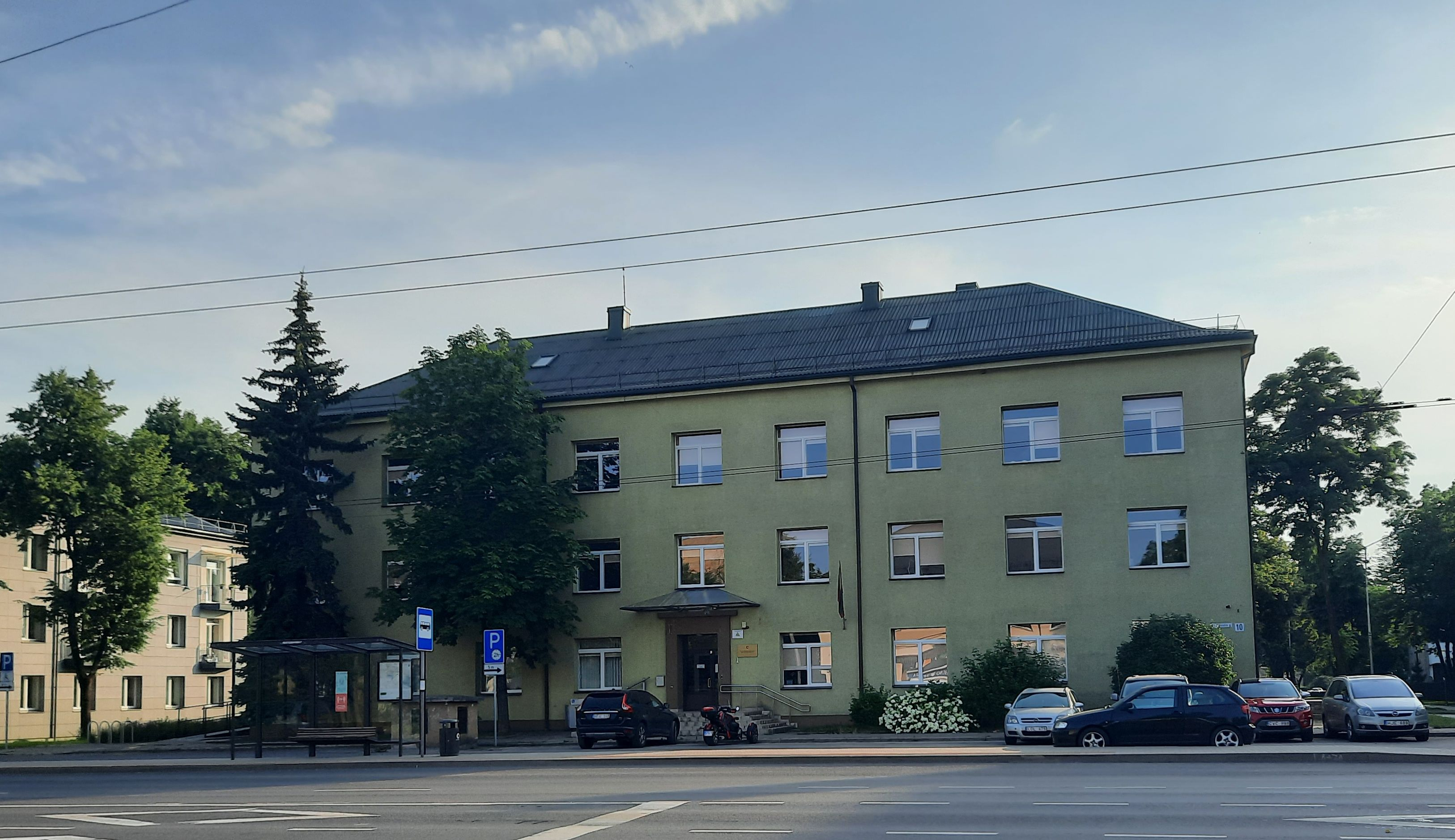
- Petrašiūnai Eldership administration

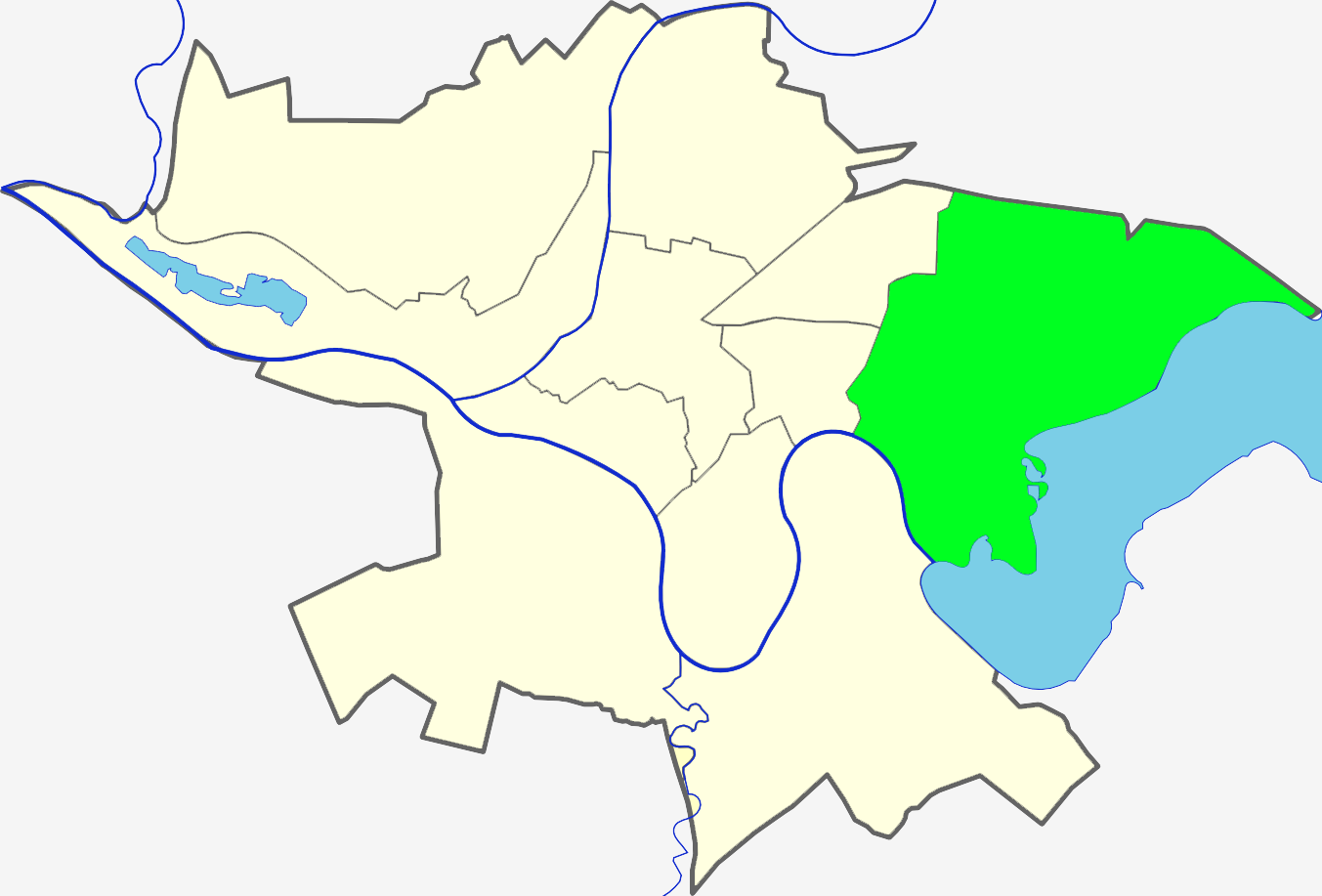
- Location of Petrašiūnai within Kaunas
- Country: Lithuania
- County: Kaunas County
- Municipality: Kaunas city municipality

Area
  - Total: 28.46 km^{2} (10.99 sq mi)

Population (2021)
  - Total: 12,835
  - Density: 451.0/km^{2} (1,168/sq mi)
- Time zone: UTC+2 (EET)
  - Summer (DST): UTC+3 (EEST)

Petrašiūnai is a neighborhood in the eastern part of the Lithuanian city of Kaunas. Part of larger Petrašiūnai elderate which also consists with Amaliai, Palemonas and Naujasodis neighborhoods. In 2006 it occupied about 28.46 km², with a population of about 18,000. Parts of the elderate are on Kaunas Reservoir Regional Park.

Its eponymous estate was established in the 18th century, and it was the center of a volost. In 1946 it was incorporated into the city. The district contains the Petrašiūnai Thermal Power Plant, one of Kaunas’s main heat generation sites. After the Kaunas Hydroelectric Power Plant was built in 1960, it grew rapidly and became one of the city's industrial centers. The elderate borders Kaunas Reservoir and includes Pažaislis monastery ensemble.

The elderate contains the Petrašiūnai cemetery, where many distinguished Lithuanian political and social activists are buried.

== Literature ==
- Petrašiūnai. Lietuviškoji tarybinė enciklopedija, VIII t. Vilnius: Mokslo ir enciklopedijų leidybos institutas, 1981. T.VIII: Moreasas-Pinturikjas, 584 psl.
