= Kaunas Combined Heat and Power Plant =

Natural gas-fired power plant in Kaunas, Lithuania

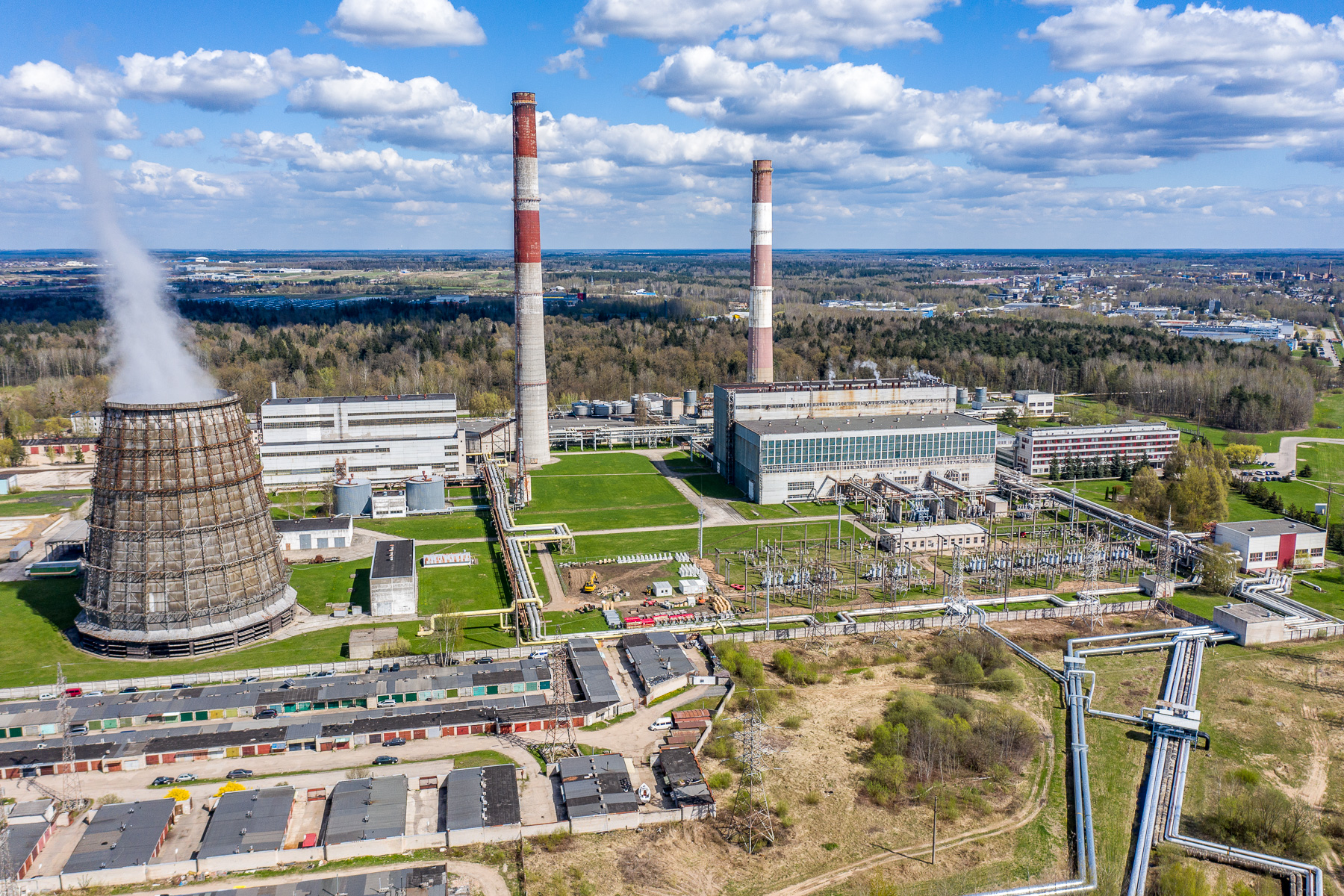
- Official name: Kauno termofikacinė elektrinė
- Country: Lithuania
- Location: Kaunas
- Coordinates: 54°55′14″N 24°01′01″E
- Status: Operational
- Construction began: 1971
- Commission date: 1975
- Operator: Clement Power Venture

Thermal power station
- Primary fuel: Natural gas
- Secondary fuel: Mazut
- Cogeneration?: Yes

Power generation
- Nameplate capacity: 170 MW
- Annual net output: 610.000 MWh (power); 1.540.000 MWh (heat)

External links
- Website: www.kte.lt
- Commons: Related media on Commons

Kaunas Combined Heat and Power Plant (Lithuanian: Kauno termofikacinė elektrinė) is a natural gas-fired power plant in Kaunas, Lithuania.

== See also ==
- List of power stations in Lithuania
