= Lifosa =

Lithuanian phosphate industry company

AB Lifosa
- Company type: Joint-stock company
- Industry: Chemical industry
- Founded: 1963 January 18
- Headquarters: Kėdainiai, Lithuania
- Key people: General Manager Andrii Savchuk
- Products: Diammonium Phosphate (DAP), Monoammonium Phosphate (MAP), Monocalcium Phosphate (MCP), Aluminium Fluoride (AlF3), Phosphoric Acid and technical grade Sulphuric Acid.
- Owner: EuroChem
- Number of employees: According to the 2017 data, in the company work 978 employees
- Website: www.lifosa.com

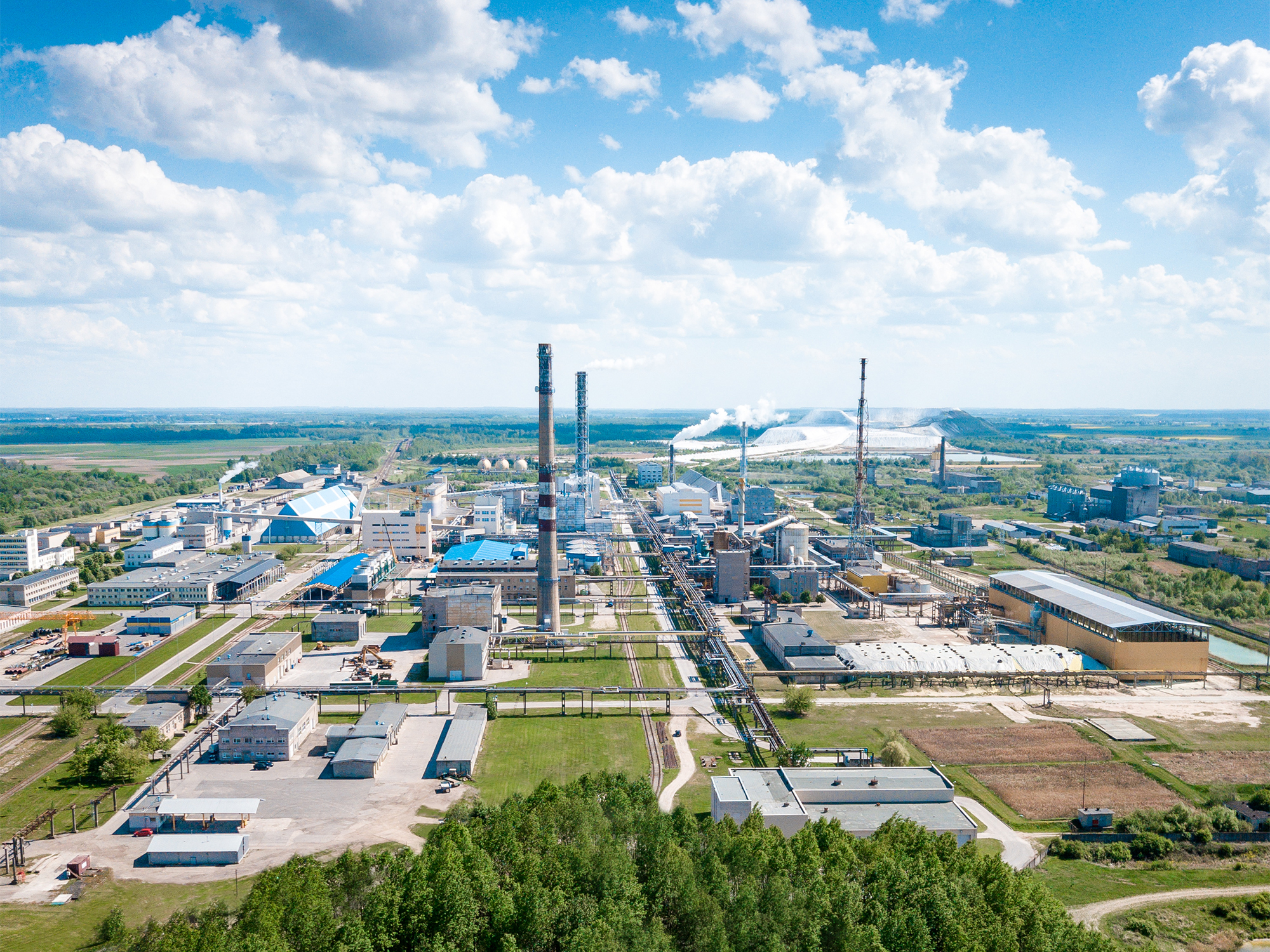
Lifosa, AB plant in Kėdainiai, Lithuania

Joint-stock company "Lifosa" is Lithuanian phosphate industry company, situated in Kėdainiai, the geographical center of Lithuania. AB "Lifosa" is one of the biggest producers of fertilizers in the Eastern Europe, exporting more than 98% of its production. The products are exported to 40-45 countries annually on all continents except Australia. The company also produces heat and power. Most of the produced energy is consumed by the company, the rest of the energy is sold. During the utilization of the heat generated by the production of sulfuric acid, a total of about 100 thousand MWh of the heat energy can be supplied to the city of Kėdainiai or about 250 mln. kWh of electricity can be produced.

== Products ==
- Diammonium phosphate (DAP)
- Monoammonium Phosphate (MAP)
- Aluminium fluoride
- Phosphoric acid
- Technical grade sulphuric acid
- Monocalcium phosphate

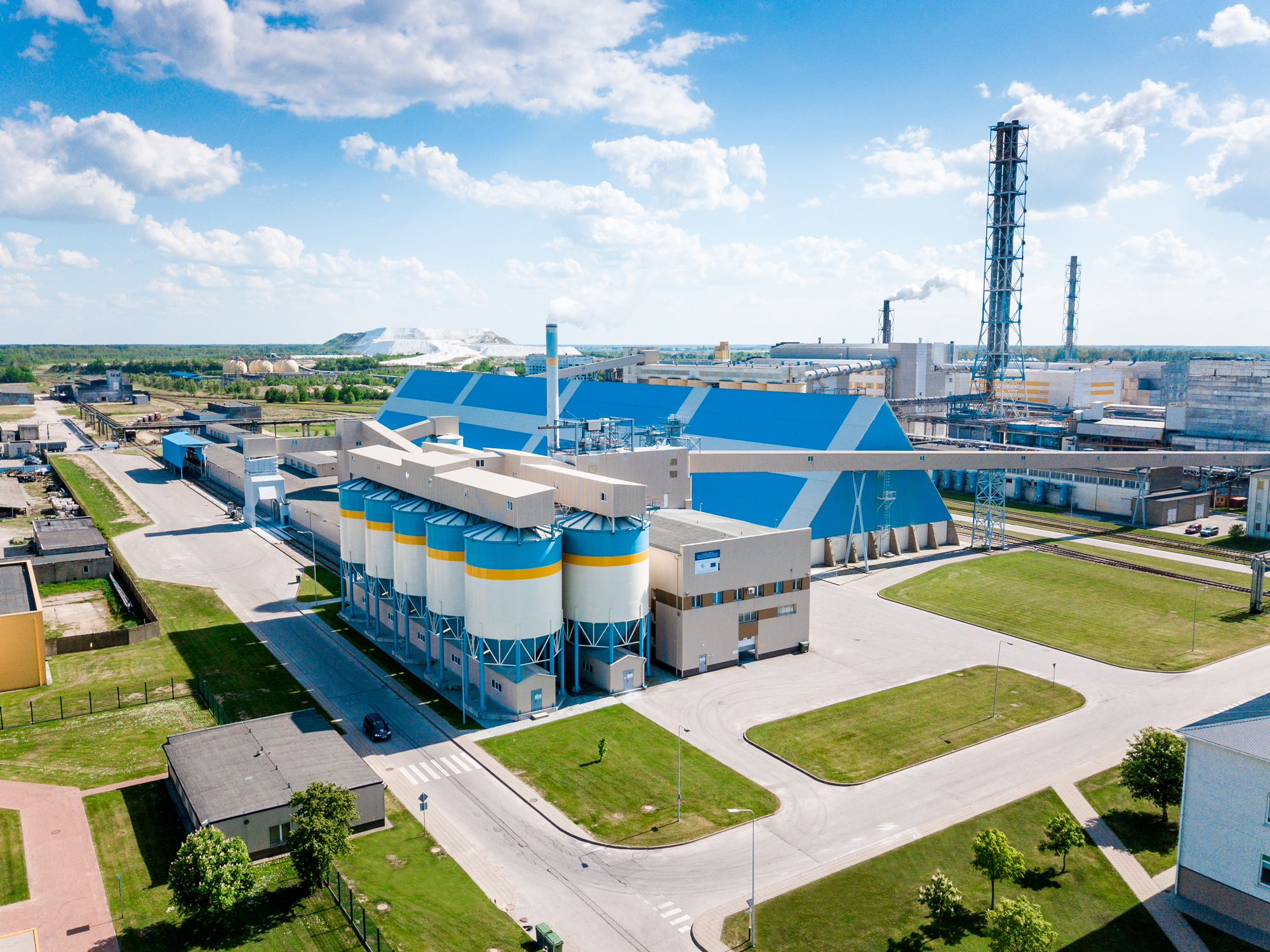
Lifosa, AB plant in Kėdainiai, Lithuania

== History ==
- 1959 ― The start of construction.
- 1963 ― January 18, the opening of the first line for production of sulfuric acid. In September of that year, the second line opened.
- 1963 ― In December, started production of powder and granular super phosphate.
- 1964 ―The launch workshop on the production aluminum fluoride, the third line for production of sulfuric acid.
- 1968 ― The shop for the production of phosphoric acid and Ammophos.
- 1970 ― second shop for the production of granulated super phosphate.
- 1972 ― The start of production of extruded mixtures of phosphorus-potassium fertilizer combination in the shop (before 1990.)
- 1973 ― In December, the fourth line for production of sulfuric acid.
- 1982 ― The opening of the second workshop on the production of phosphoric acid (the old closed for renovation.)
- 1984 ― New shop for aluminum fluoride (old closed.)
- 1985 ― Was opened after reconstruction of the first workshop of phosphoric acid.
- 1986 ― Built and launched a third line production of Ammophos.
- 1988 ― In the autumn the plant has passed the first congress of the Lithuanian Greens. As a result of their demands obsolete lines of sulfuric acid production were closed. After closure, where was sharp reduction in the lung cancer cases in the surrounding area. Introduction of new, modern sulfuric acid line.
- 1996 ― The privatization of the enterprise.
- 2001 ― The start of production of dicalcium phosphate.
- 2002 ― Starts production of mono-calcium phosphate.
- 2002 ― The majority share package was acquired by Swiss company EuroChem.
- 2004 ― Starts production of monodicalcium phosphate production.
- 2007 ― AB "Lifosa" implemented the Project "Utilization of local and recovered process heat at the sulphuric acid unit in power generation process", completed the installation of the Heat Recovery System HRS. The system enables to produce more heat and electricity by more efficiently utilizing the sulphuric acid process heat. The EU structural funds granted the support to this Project.
- 2010 ― The Company invested more than 90 million LTL into the construction of new objects and launching of new equipment and significantly increased the production capacity.
- 2010 ― The longest transporter in Lithuania (880 meters) was built.
- 2012 ― the construction of the multifunctional sports and entertainment complex "Kedainiai Arena" was started. The construction of this complex was financed by AB "Lifosa", the investment amounting to appr. 17 million LTL. Kedainiai Arena was opened August 2013. This was the present of AB "Lifosa" to the city.
- 2013 ― AB "Lifosa" invested 77.4 million LTL into new technologies and environmental protection projects.
- 2014 ― The new converter was installed in Sulphuric acid plant. It made possible to increase the conversion of SO2 (contacting) degree from 99.7% to 99.9%.
- 2017 ― New production plant of soluble crystalline mono-ammonium phosphate (MAP) was started, having the design production capacity of 30 thousand tons per year.
- 2018 ― This year, the company will start to produce another type of completely soluble fertilizer ― urea phosphate.
- 2021 ― in January, a 1 MW solar power plant was opened at the phosphorus fertilizer factory.

== Environmental Protection ==
The environmental activities of AB "Lifosa" are run following the requirements of the environmental legislation and other normative documents currently valid in the Republic of Lithuania. Annually, around 30% of the investment resources are used to implement new environmental projects, develop technologies and rationalize the use of natural resources. Making investments into innovation and modernization of the technological processes, the management of AB "Lifosa" always focuses on environmental issues and efficiency improvement. In 2003, the environmental management system conforming to the requirements of ISO 14001:2004 was implemented in the company.
