= Sixth Seimas =

Sixth Seimas of Lithuania
←	Supreme Council of the Republic of Lithuania	Seventh Seimas of Lithuania	→
- Seimas Palace

Overview
- Legislative body: Seimas
- Jurisdiction: Lithuania
- Term: 1992—1996

The Sixth Seimas of Lithuania was the first parliament (Seimas) elected in Lithuania after it restored independence on 11 March 1990. Elections took place on 25 October 1992, with the second round on 15 November. In a surprisingly decisive outcome, the elections were won by Democratic Labour Party of Lithuania (LDDP), with 73 seats. The result reflected widespread dissatisfaction with the economic situation and the policies of the ruling Sąjūdis political movement in the preceding Supreme Council of Lithuania.

The Sixth Seimas commenced its work on 25 November 1992 and served a four-year term, with the last session on 19 November 1996. Algirdas Brazauskas, the leader of LDDP, became the Speaker of the Seimas, before assuming the role of the President of Lithuania. He was succeeded as the Speaker by his party colleague Česlovas Juršėnas, who served for the rest of the term.

Three LDDP-led governments changed during the term of the Sixth Seimas. The government of Bronislovas Lubys, an independent business manager, served for a short period before the presidential election in 1993. The government of Adolfas Šleževičius was in power for most of the term, but the Prime Minister was forced out after a financial scandal in December 1995. Laurynas Stankevičius led the government for the rest of the term.

The Sixth Seimas adopted a number of laws, mostly related to agricultural reform, implementation of the Constitution of Lithuania and the introduction of Litas as the national currency. Supervision of financial markets was enhanced after a number of early financial institutions collapsed and other financial scandals came to light in 1994. On the other hand, the slow pace of market reforms, failure to restore the ownership of confiscated private property and weak efforts to fight corruption were criticized by the opposition. The chaotic process of privatization of public assets also came under criticism for allowing well-connected individuals and groups to take control of state enterprises.

== Elections ==
In the elections in 1992, 70 members of the parliament were elected on proportional party lists and 71 in single member constituencies. Elections took place on 25 October 1992. In those constituencies where no candidate won outright on 25 October, a run-off was held on 15 November.

The main challenger to the ruling Sąjūdis nationalist movement, which had controlled the Supreme Council since February 1990 and spearheaded the move to independence, was the Democratic Labour Party of Lithuania (LDDP). In the run-up to the elections, Sąjūdis portrayed the opposing political groups as communist and reactionary, opposed to independence and democracy. The LDDP declared their commitment to maintaining foreign policy goals, including joining Council of Europe and agreements with other international organizations, while also promising friendlier relations and better trade with Russia.

The result was a victory for the LDDP, which won 73 seats. Analysts attributed the surprisingly decisive victory to support from farmers and the Russian and Polish minorities, as well as widespread dissatisfaction with the economic situation and the policies of the ruling Sąjūdis political movement, which only managed to win 30 seats.

Party	Abbr.	PR votes	%	Seats		
Party	Abbr.	PR votes	%	PR	Constituency	Total
Democratic Labour Party of Lithuania	LDDP	817,331	44.0	36	37	73
Sąjūdis	LPS	393,500	21.2	17	11	30
Citizens' Charter of the Republic of Lithuania	LRPCH	393,500	21.2	17	2	30
Lithuanian Christian Democratic Party	LKDP	234,368	12.6	10	8	18
Lithuanian Union of Political Prisoners and Deportees	PKTS	234,368	12.6	10	2	18
Lithuanian Democratic Party	DP	234,368	12.6	10	0	18
Social Democratic Party of Lithuania	LSDP	112,410	6.0	5	3	8
Lithuanian Christian Democratic Union	LKDS	66,027	3.6	0	1	1
Young Lithuania		66,027	3.6	0	0	0
Lithuanian Centre Movement	LCJ	46,908	2.2	0	2	2
Association of Poles in Lithuania	LLS	39,772	2.1	2	2	4
Lithuanian Nationalist Union	LTS	36,916	2.0	0	3	3
Independence Party	NP	36,916	2.0	0	1	1
Liberal Union of Lithuania		28,091	1.5	0	0	0
Lithuanian Liberty League		22,034	1.2	0	0	0
National Progress Movement		19,835	1.1	0	0	0
Moderates Movement		13,002	0.7	0	0	0
Socio-Political Movement for Social Justice		9,730	0.5	0	0	0
Lithuanian Liberty Union		7,760	0.42	0	0	0
Lithuanian Movement "Chernobyl"		4,827	0.3	0	0	0
Lithuanian Commonwealth		4,159	0.22	0	0	0
Union of Lithuania's Patriots		1,904	0.1	0	0	0
Independents		–	–	–	1	1
Invalid/blank votes		59,453	–	–	–	–
Total		1,919,027	100	70	71	141
Registered voters/turnout		2,549,952	75.3	–	–	–

== Activities ==
Speaker of the Seimas

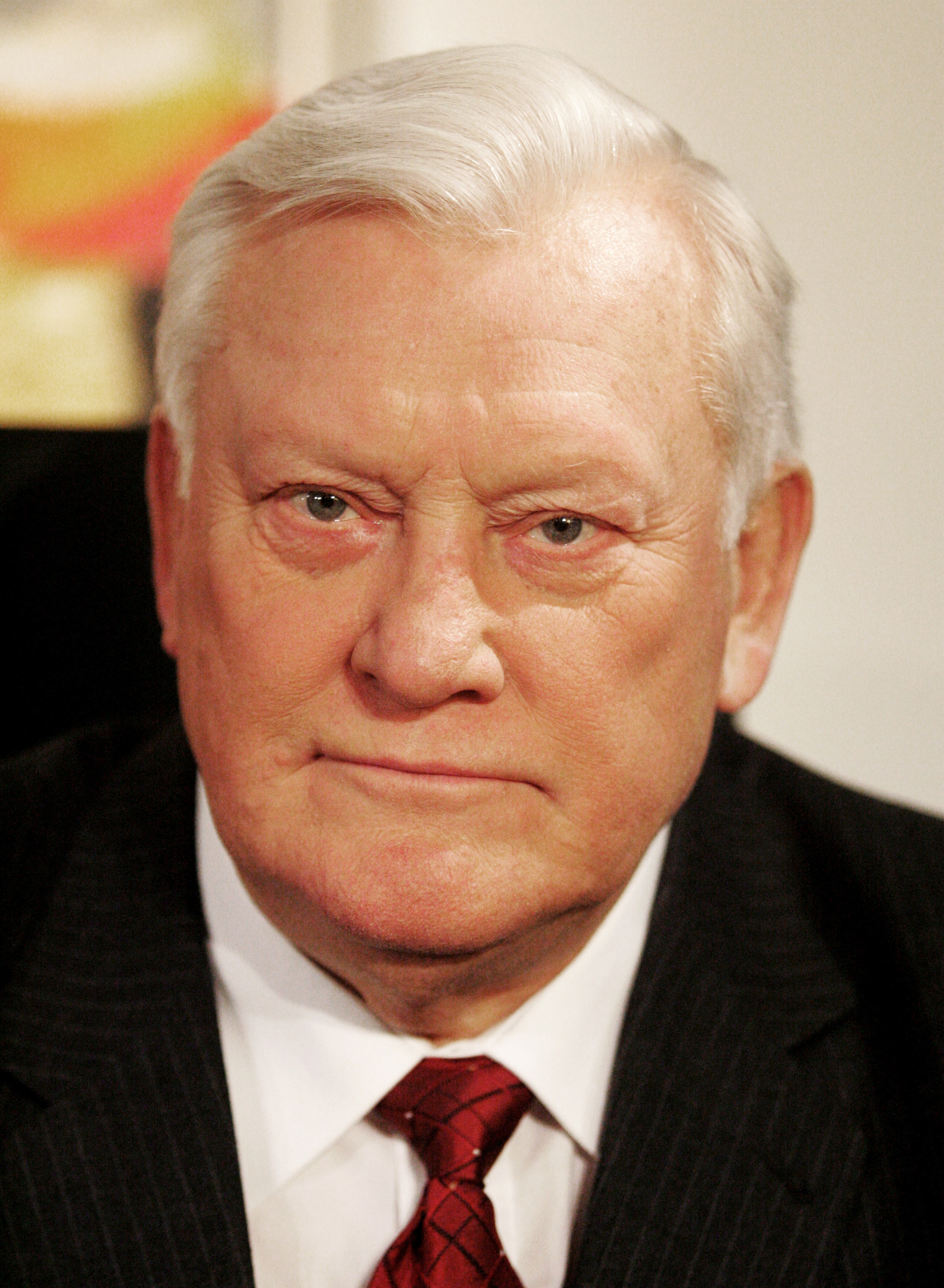
Algirdas Brazauskas (LDDP)
25 November 1992 - 25 February 1993

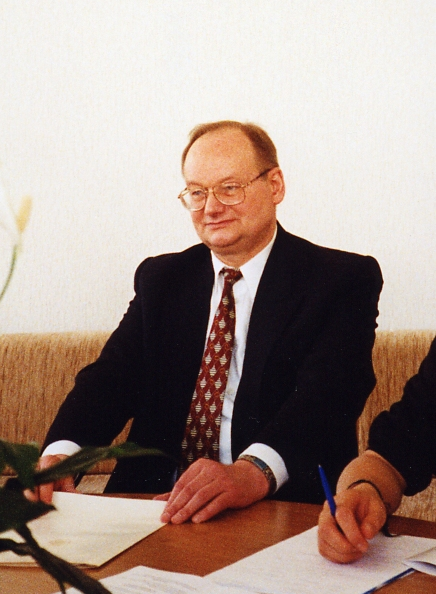
Česlovas Juršėnas (LDDP)
25 February 1993 – 25 November 1996

The newly elected Sixth Seimas first gathered on 25 November 1992. In what was to become a procedural tradition, the first session was presided over by the oldest member of the parliament – Juozas Bulavas. As the new parliament lacked clear procedures governing its work (the Statute of Seimas was only adopted on 26 February 1994), it was decided to follow the regulations of the preceding Supreme Council of Lithuania.

Algirdas Brazauskas was elected as the first Speaker of the Sixth Seimas, supported by 81 of the parliament members. Brazauskas only acted in this capacity for less than a day – as soon as Seimas adopted the necessary legal framework, he assumed the position of acting President of Lithuania, in accordance with the constitution. His deputy, Česlovas Juršėnas became the acting Speaker of the Parliament. After the presidential election early the following year, Brazauskas became the first post-independence President of Lithuania, resigned from the Seimas and Juršėnas was elected as the Speaker for the remainder of the term.

Algirdas Brazauskas proposed Bronislovas Lubys, the managing director of “Azotas” (later Achema), as the Prime Minister of the fifth government. His candidacy was approved by the parliament with 87 votes in favor. It was understood that the government was to be short-lived, as it would have to return its mandate after the presidential elections early in 1993. The government included only three members of LDDP, while nine ministers retained their positions from the previous Sąjūdis-led government. In late 1992 and early 1993 the Seimas adopted the laws implementing the position of the President of Lithuania and governing the elections.

After the presidential elections, Brazauskas put forward economist and businessman Adolfas Šleževičius as the Prime Minister of the sixth government. His candidacy was approved by the Seimas and the government started their work on 16 March 1993, with the stated priorities of creating the foundations for competitive market economy and improving social safety net.

In order to secure monetary stability and control the inflation, Litas was introduced as the national currency of Lithuania, with the circulation starting on 25 June 1993. In 1994, it was pegged to the US Dollar at the rate of 4:1. The introduction of the currency did not soften the growing tensions between the Government, the Seimas and the Bank of Lithuania, which was criticized for its commercial activities and poor supervision of commercial banks. On 10 March 1993, the parliament accepted the resignation of bank's chairman, Vilius Baldišius, replacing him with Romualdas Visokavičius two weeks later. After the Commission for Investigating Financial Crimes, established by the Seimas, uncovered irregularities and illegal transactions in the bank, the Seimas expressed no-confidence in Visokavičius on 19 October 1993, forcing him out and replacing him with Kazimieras Ratkevičius.

Failure to supervise the financial sector, at that point dominated by weak banks and outright financial pyramids that wiped out the savings of a substantial part of the population, was cited by the opposition as one of the reasons for its proposal to express no-confidence in the Government in June 1994, the first such proposal in post-independence Lithuania. Nevertheless, the government survived this and another interpellation on 31 October 1995. The situation changed after the collapse of two commercial banks in December 1995. It emerged that Prime Minister Šleževičius had withdrawn his savings from one of the two banks just days before its collapse. After refusing to resign, he was forced out by the Seimas in a secret-ballot vote on 19 December 1995, with 94 members supporting his ousting. Laurynas Stankevičius, a minister in the Šleževičius cabinet, was approved by the Seimas on 15 February 1996 as the Prime Minister of the seventh government and served until the end of the term of the Seimas.

Almost half of all the laws adopted during the period of the Sixth Seimas were related to agricultural reform, implementation of the Constitution of Lithuania and the introduction of Litas as the national currency. Among other important decisions, the Seimas adopted a structural reform of the judiciary and set up the Constitutional Court. The taxation system was reformed, partly in response to budget deficits that the Sixth Seimas never managed to close, and the Value Added Tax introduced. Dual-layered local government was introduced, with municipal and county administrations sharing the responsibility. Municipal administrations took over functions previously held by powiats, while county administrations took over functions previously held by the central government.

On the other hand, the opposition criticized the successive governments and the ruling majority for the slow pace of market reforms, failure to restore the ownership of confiscated private property and weak efforts to fight corruption.

The privatization program, which had been started already in 1990, was initially criticized by the newly elected parliamentary majority, but soon continued. In a chaotic process, the laws governing privatization were reviewed and changed constantly, but still had loopholes in them that allowed well-connected individuals and financial groups to assume control of government property at fire-sale prices. The second stage of privatization started in July 1995 with Seimas adopting the new Law on Privatization of Government and Municipal Property. The new law attempted to eliminate many of the weaknesses in the privatization process – assets could now be sold only for cash, discounts for employees were eliminated and equal participation rights were granted to local and foreign investors. However, the new law did not meet the expectations and the privatization process remained inefficient and prone to corruption.

The two largest powers in the Sixth Seimas had vastly different views on how the land reform should take place. Sąjūdis (and Homeland Union that emerged from it) focused on returning the agricultural land to those that had lost it in the waves of Soviet collectivization and implemented it as a policy when in power before 1992. LDDP, on the other hand, prioritized maintaining the existing levels of production, which meant ensuring that the land stays in the hands of those who would work it most efficiently. Once in power, LDDP introduced changes to the Law on Land Reform, slowing down the process of restitution and limiting its scope.

In foreign policy, the Sixth Seimas maintained a pro-European stance, despite Sąjūdis warning the electorate that the success of LDDP would inevitably orient Lithuania towards Russia. Instead, the LDDP-led Sixth Seimas proclaimed the continuity of the previous foreign policy. The last of Russian military forces left Lithuania in 1993. Lithuania soon joined the Council of Europe, while maintaining its long-term goals of joining NATO and European Union. Application to NATO for possible membership has been sent in 1994, application to EU has been sent one year later

== Composition ==
=== Leadership ===
The board of the Seimas consisted of the Speaker of the Seimas, his deputies and the chancellor of the Seimas. The functions assigned to these positions and the procedures for their appointment evolved during the term.

Speaker of the Seimas
Name	Party	Term
Algirdas Brazauskas	LDDP	25 November 1992 - 25 February 1993
Česlovas Juršėnas	LDDP	25 November 1992 - 25 February 1993 (Acting)
Česlovas Juršėnas	LDDP	25 February 1993 - 25 November 1996
Deputy Speakers of the Seimas
Name	Party	Term
Česlovas Juršėnas	LDDP	25 November 1992 - 25 February 1993
Aloyzas Sakalas	LSDP	15 December 1992 - 17 June 1993 (Acting)
Aloyzas Sakalas	LSDP	17 June 1993 - 25 November 1996
Egidijus Bičkauskas	LCJ	15 December 1992 - 17 June 1993 (Acting)
Egidijus Bičkauskas	LCJ	17 June 1993 - 25 November 1996
Juozas Bernatonis	LDDP	17 June 1993 - 25 November 1996
Chancellor of the Seimas
Name	Party	Term
Neris Germanas	LDDP	17 June 1993 - 29 October 1996
Juozas Bernatonis	LDDP	5 November 1996 - 25 November 1996 (Acting)

=== Parliamentary groups ===
On the second day of the term, 26 November 1992, the following parliamentary groups were registered: Christian Democrats, Sąjūdis, Citizen Charter, Democratic Labour Party of Lithuania, Social Democrats of Lithuania. While politically aligned, Christian Democrats, Sąjūdis and Citizen Charter formed three separate political groups in the Seimas in order to secure more seats in parliamentary committees. Nevertheless, the alignment fractured, as the Political Prisoners and Deportees and the Democratic Party left the political group of Christian Democrats, while only 23 of the 30 members of Sąjūdis and Citizen Charter joined the parliamentary group of Homeland Union-Lithuanian Conservatives.

The opposition to the government in the Sixth Seimas was twofold: Homeland Union-Lithuanian Conservatives led the radical opposition, relentlessly criticizing the government, while the Social Democrats and the Centre Union formed the moderate opposition. During the term there were several cases of departures or expulsions from both the ruling political group of the Democratic Labour Party and the opposition political groups. However, due to the vast gulf between the ruling and opposition parties, there were few defections across ideological borders.

The following parliamentary groups were active at the end of the term.

Composition of the Seimas at the end of 1992-1996 term.
Name	Abbr.	Members
Democratic Labour Party of Lithuania	LDDPF	71
Homeland Union - Conservatives	TSKF	23
Christian Democrats	KDF	12
Social Democratic Party of Lithuania	LSDPF	7
Lithuanian Nationalist Union	LTSF	4
Association of Poles in Lithuania	LLSF	4
Democratic Party	DPF	3
Freedom of Political Prisoners and Deportees	PKTLF	5
Others	MSNG	8
Vacant seats		4

=== Committees ===
Parliamentary committees are formed to consider draft legislation and can explore and clarify other issues in their area of competence. Eleven committees were active during the Sixth Seimas.

Committees of the Seimas
Agriculture	Budget and Finance	Economy
Environment	National Security	Health, Social Security and Labor
Education, Science and Culture	Foreign affairs	State reforms and municipalities
State and Law	Human and citizen rights and minority affairs	

=== Commissions ===
Permanent of temporary parliamentary commissions are formed to work on a particular question or issue assigned to them by the Seimas.

Permanent commission active during the term of the Sixth Seimas were Ethics, Administration and Petition commissions. Of particular interest in the Sixth Seimas was the Commission for Investigating Financial Crimes, established by the Seimas in 1993 and headed by parliament member Virgilijus Vladislovas Bulovas (later - by Vytautas Juškus). The commission worked to identify loopholes in existing laws that allowed officials and well-connected individuals to take possession of government property and investigated corruption by government officials. The commission also dealt with numerous financial scandals that took place during the term, particularly the failure of several commercial banks at the end of 1995.

Temporary commissions were created to investigate ad-hoc questions. During the term of the Sixth Seimas these questions included the activities of commercial banks, the activities of the House of Signatories, and the decisions of the previous government of Gediminas Vagnorius.

=== Members ===
A total of 147 members served on the Sixth Seimas, including 137 men and 10 women. The vast majority of Seimas members were ethnic Lithuanians. Russian and Polish ethnic minorities, each constituting around 6% of the population in Lithuania, were represented by 3 and 6 members, respectively.

Parliament member	Constituency	Electoral list	Parliamentary group
Zenonas Petras Adomaitis	41 Kelmės	LDDP	LDDPF
Albinas Albertynas	62 Jurbarko	LDDP	LDDPF
Vilija Aleknaitė-Abramikienė	Nationwide	LPS	TSKF
Leonas Alesionka	Nationwide	LDDP	LDDPF
Nijolė Ambrazaitytė	9 Lazdynų	LRPCH	TSKF
Laima Andrikienė	Nationwide	LPS	TSKF
Vytenis Andriukaitis	Nationwide	LSDP	LSDPF
Jonas Algirdas Antanaitis (From 14 October 1995)	Nationwide	LSDP	LSDPF
Kazimieras Antanavičius	31 Gargždų	LSDP	LSDPF, MSNG
Vytautas Arbačiauskas	Nationwide	LDDP	LDDPF
Vytautas Astrauskas	3 Antakalnio	LDDP	LDDPF
Arvydas Bajoras	63 Suvalkijos	LDDP	LDDPF
Alvydas Baležentis	71 Lazdijų-Druskininkų	LTS	LTSF
Juozas Baranauskas	39 Akmenės -Joniškio	LDDP	LDDPF
Antanas Baskas	Nationwide	LDDP	LDDPF, LSDPF
Juozas Bastys (Until 8 October 1994)	Nationwide	LDDP	LDDPF
Julius Beinortas	28 Aukštaitijos	LKDP	KDF
Aleksandras Bendinskas	Nationwide	LDDP	LDDPF
Juozas Bernatonis	Nationwide	LDDP	LDDPF
Egidijus Bičkauskas	7 Justiniškių	LCJ	MSNG
Romualdas Ignas Bloškys	Nationwide	LDDP	LDDPF
Kazys Bobelis	29 Marijampolės	LKDS	MSNG
Vytautas Bogušis	Nationwide	LKDP-LPKTS-DP	KDF
Algirdas Brazauskas (Until 25 February 1993)	59 Kaišiadorių	LDDP	LDDPF
Vanda Briedienė	Nationwide	LKDP-LPKTS-DP	PKTLF
Vytautas Bubnys	67 Prienų	LDDP	LDDPF, MSNG
Antanas Būdvytis	Nationwide	LDDP	LDDPF
Vytautas Algimantas Buinevičius	Nationwide	LDDP	LDDPF
Juozas Bulavas (Until 20 July 1995)	Nationwide	LDDP	LDDPF
Virgilijus Vladislovas Bulovas	Nationwide	LDDP	LDDPF
Sigita Burbienė	6 Šeškinės	LDDP	LDDPF
Vladas Butėnas	32 Šilutės	LDDP	LDDPF
Medardas Čobotas	Nationwide	LKDP-LPKTS-DP	KDF
Rimantas Dagys	Nationwide	LSDP	LSDPF
Kęstutis Dirgėla	19 Danės	LPS	TSKF
Juozas Dringelis	Nationwide	LPS	TSKF
Arūnas Eigirdas (Until 13 April 1993)	Nationwide	LPS	TSKF
Vytautas Einoris (From 25 March 1995)	59 Kaišiadorių	LDDP	LDDPF
Algirdas Endriukaitis	64 Šakių; Nationwide (Note: On 14 April 1993 the Central Electoral Commission declared the previously announced results in three electoral districts invalid, citing the decisions of the Supreme Court of Lithuania. Romualda Hofertienė, elected in the (20) Baltijos single-seat constituency, lost her seat to Irena Šiaulienė. Since Šiaulienė was already a member of the Seimas through the electoral list of LDDP, the next person on the list, Virginijus Ražukas, qualified for a seat. Romualda Hofertienė would later return to the Seimas through the electoral list of LPS after Tautvydas Lideikis died. Stasys Malkevičius ((22) Pajūrio) and Algirdas Endriukaitis ((64) Šakių) lost their single-seat constituencies to Ričardas Žurinskas and Zigmas Povilaitis, but retained their Seimas' seats, as they would have qualified through the electoral list of LPS. Instead, the lowest-ranked members to have qualified through the electoral list of LPS (Arūnas Eigirdas and Juozas Janonis) lost their seats.)	LPS	MSNG
Balys Gajauskas	Nationwide	LKDP-LPKTS-DP	PKTLF
Kęstutis Gaška	70 Varėnos-Eišiškių	LDDP	LDDPF, MSNG
Neris Germanas (Until 29 October 1996)	23 Aušros	LDDP	LDDPF
Bronislavas Genzelis	1 Naujamiesčio	LDDP	LDDPF
Alfonsas Giedraitis	Nationwide	LDDP	LDDPF
Povilas Gylys	51 Utenos	LDDP	LDDPF
Petras Giniotas	21 Marių	LPS	LPS, KDF
Algimantas Antanas Greimas	68 Vilkaviškio	LDDP	LDDPF
Algirdas Gricius	Nationwide	LDDP	LDDPF
Romualda Hofertienė (Until 13 April 1993) (From 15 July 1993)	20 Baltijos; Nationwide	LPS	TSKF
Arvydas Ivaškevičius	25 Dainų	LDDP	LDDPF
Bronislovas Jagminas	Nationwide	LDDP	LDDPF
Povilas Jakučionis	Nationwide	LKDP-LPKTS-DP	PKTLF
Juozas Janonis (Until 13 April 1993)	Nationwide	LPS	TSKF
Egidijus Jarašiūnas (Until 19 March 1996)	26 Nevėžio	LPS	TSKF
Vladimir Jarmolenko	16 Dainavos	LPS	TSKF
Leonardas Kęstutis Jaskelevičius	Nationwide	LDDP	LDDPF
Gema Jurkūnaitė	Nationwide	LDDP	LDDPF
Česlovas Juršėnas	53 Ignalinos-Švenčionių	LDDP	LDDPF
Vytautas Juškus (Until 29 October 1996)	24 Saulės	LDDP	LDDPF
Antanas Kairys	44 Radviliškio	LDDP	LDDPF
Vytautas Kanapeckas	47 Pasvalio-Panevėžio	LDDP	LDDPF
Justinas Karosas	Nationwide	LDDP	LDDPF
Povilas Katilius	15 Kalniečių	LKDP	KDF
Juozapas Algirdas Katkus	13 Centro	LPS	TSKF
Gediminas Kirkilas	Nationwide	LDDP	LDDPF
Feliksas Kolosauskas	49 Anykščių-Kupiškio	LDDP	LDDPF
Kazimieras Vytautas Kryževičius	Nationwide	LKDP-LPKTS-DP	KDF
Kęstutis Kubertavičius	Nationwide	LDDP	LDDPF
Andrius Kubilius	Nationwide	LPS	TSKF
Jonas Kubilius	Nationwide	LDDP	LDDPF
Algirdas Kunčinas	5 Fabijoniškių	LDDP	LDDPF
Elvyra Janina Kunevičienė	33 Šilutės-Šilalės	LPKTS	PKTLF
Kazimieras Kuzminskas	18 Panemunės	LKDP	KDF
Vytautas Landsbergis	Nationwide	LPS	TSKF
Vaclovas Lapė	Nationwide	LPS	TSKF
Tautvydas Lideikis (Until 9 July 1993)	Nationwide	LPS	TSKF
Linas Antanas Linkevičius	Nationwide	LDDP	LDDPF
Juozas Listavičius	Nationwide	LPS	TSKF
Vytautas Liutikas	40 Telšių	LDDP	LDDPF
Albinas Lozuraitis	Nationwide	LDDP	LDDPF
Ryšard Maciejkianiec	57 Vilniaus-Trakų	LLS	LLSF
Valentinas Mačiulis	Nationwide	LDDP	LDDPF
Stasys Malkevičius	22 Pajūrio; Nationwide	LPS	TSKF
Rimantas Markauskas	Nationwide	LDDP	LDDPF
Nikolaj Medvedev	Nationwide	LSDP	LSDPF
Leonas Milčius	65 Kauno-Kėdainių	LTS	LTSF
Gabriel Jan Mincevič	Nationwide	LLS	LLSF
Petras Algirdas Miškinis	Nationwide	LKDP-LPKTS-DP	KDF
Alfonsas Navickas	38 Mažeikių	LDDP	LDDPF
Juozas Nekrošius	42 Raseinių	LDDP	LDDPF
Antanas Nesteckis (Until 16 July 1996)	Nationwide	LDDP	LDDPF
Romualdas Ozolas	Nationwide	LCJ	MSNG
Justas Vincas Paleckis (From 30 August 1995) (Until 13 October 1995)	Nationwide	LSDP	LSDPF
Jonas Pangonis	69 Dzūkijos	LSDP	LSDPF, LDDPF
Petras Papovas	52 Zarasų	LDDP	LDDPF
Algirdas Vaclovas Patackas	14 Žaliakalnio	LPS	LPS, KDF
Kęstutis Povilas Paukštys	17 Pramonės	LPS	TSKF
Gediminas Adolfas Paviržis	2 Senamiesčio	LDDP	LDDPF
Saulius Pečeliūnas	Nationwide	LKDP-LPKTS-DP	DPF
Vytautas Petkevičius	46 Pakruojo-Joniškio	LDDP	LDDPF
Valdas Petrauskas	Nationwide	LKDP-LPKTS-DP	DPF
Vytautas Petras Plečkaitis	Nationwide	LSDP	LSDPF
Artur Plokšto	Nationwide	LLS	LLSF
Algirdas Pocius	Nationwide	LDDP	LDDPF
Zigmas Povilaitis (From 14 April 1993)	64 Šakių	LDDP	LDDPF
Juras Požela	Nationwide	LDDP	LDDPF
Vincentas Pranevičius	60 Jonavos	LDDP	LDDPF
Mykolas Pronckus	35 Plungės	LDDP	LDDPF
Antanas Račas	Nationwide	LPS	TSKF
Everistas Raišuotis	54 Molėtų-Švenčionių	LDDP	LDDPF
Arimantas Juvencijus Raškinis	12 Aleksoto-Vilijampolės	LKDP	KDF
Algirdas Ražauskas	Nationwide	LDDP	LDDPF
Virginijus Ražukas (From 14 April 1993)	Nationwide	LDDP	LDDPF
Audrius Rudys (Until 29 August 1995)	Nationwide	LSDP	LSDPF
Benediktas Vilmantas Rupeika	55 Širvintų-Vilniaus	LDDP	LDDPF
Algirdas Sadkauskas (Until 15 September 1996)	58 Trakų	LDDP	LDDPF
Aloyzas Sakalas	Nationwide	LSDP	LSDPF
Algimantas Salamakinas	Nationwide	LDDP	LDDPF
Algirdas Saudargas	Nationwide	LKDP-LPKTS-DP	KDF
Vytautas Saulis	50 Rokiškio	LDDP	LDDPF
Zbignev Semenovič	56 Vilniaus-Šalčininkų	LPS	LLSF
Kęstutis Skrebys	27 Vakarinė	NP	TSKF
Karolis Snežko (Until 24 August 1996)	Nationwide	LDDP	LDDPF
Mindaugas Stakvilevičius	45 Šiaulių kaim.	LDDP	LDDPF
Antanas Napoleonas Stasiškis	Nationwide	LPS	TSKF
Saulius Šaltenis	Nationwide	LPS	TSKF
Irena Šiaulienė	Nationwide; 20 Baltijos	LDDP	LDDPF
Zita Šličytė	34 Tauragės	LPKTS	PKTLF
Vytautas Šumakaris	10 N. Vilnios	LDDP	LDDPF
Juozapas Tartilas	Nationwide	LKDP-LPKTS-DP	DPF
Algimantas Povilas Tauras	Nationwide	LDDP	LDDPF
Mečislovas Treinys	66 Kauno kaim.	LTS	LTSF
Pranciškus Tupikas	8 Karoliniškių	LPS	TSKF
Kazimieras Uoka	Nationwide	LPS	LPS, LTSF
Ignacas Stasys Uždavinys	36 Kretingos	LKDP	KDF
Gediminas Vagnorius	Nationwide	LPS	TSKF
Alfonsas Vaišnoras	11 Šilainių	LPS	TSKF
Albinas Vaižmužis	48 Biržų-Kupiškio	Independent	MSNG
Virmantas Velikonis	43 Kėdainių	LDDP	LDDPF
Julius Veselka	30 Alytaus	LDDP	LDDPF
Marijonas Visakavičius	61 Ukmergės	LDDP	LDDPF
Pranciškus Stanislavas Vitkevičius	37 Skuodo-Mažeikių	LDDP	LDDPF
Vytautas Vidmantas Zimnickas	Nationwide	LDDP	LDDPF
Emanuelis Zingeris	4 Žirmūnų	LRPCH	TSKF
Juozas Žebrauskas	Nationwide	LDDP	LDDPF
Vidmantas Žiemelis	Nationwide	LPS	TSKF
Ričardas Žurinskas (From 14 April 1993)	22 Pajūrio	LDDP	LDDPF
