= Seventh Seimas =

Seventh Seimas of Lithuania
←	Sixth Seimas of Lithuania	Eighth Seimas of Lithuania	→
- Seimas Palace

Overview
- Legislative body: Seimas
- Jurisdiction: Lithuania
- Term: 1996—2000

The Seventh Seimas of Lithuania was the parliament (Seimas) elected in Lithuania. Elections took place on 20 October 1996, with the second round on 10 November. The Seimas commenced its work on 25 November 1996 and served a four-year term, with the last session on 18 October 2000.

== Elections ==
In the elections in 1996, 70 members of the parliament were elected on proportional party lists and 71 in single member constituencies. Elections took place on 20 October 1996. In those constituencies where no candidate gained a majority of votes on 20 October, a run-off was held on 10 November.

The elections were won by the Homeland Union - Lithuanian Conservative Party, which gained 70 seats, followed by 16 seats won by Lithuanian Christian Democratic Party. Democratic Labour Party of Lithuania, which had decisively won the previous elections, ended up with only 12 seats.

Party	Abbr.	PR votes	%	Seats		
Party	Abbr.	PR votes	%	PR	Constituency	Total
Homeland Union - Lithuanian Conservatives	TSLK	409,585	31.34	33	37	70
Lithuanian Christian Democratic Party	LKDP	136,259	10.43	11	5	16
Democratic Labour Party of Lithuania	LDDP	130,837	10.01	10	2	12
Centre Union of Lithuania	LCS	113,333	8.67	9	4	13
Lithuanian Social-Democrat Party	LSDP	90,756	6.94	7	5	12
Young Lithuania	JL	52,423	4.01	0	1	1
Lithuanian Women's Party	LMP	50,494	3.86	0	1	1
Lithuanian Christian Democratic Union	LKDS	42,346	3.24	0	1	1
Electoral Action of Poles in Lithuania	LLRA	39,773	3.14	0	1	1
Alliance of the Lithuanian National Minorities		33,389	2.55	0	0	0
Lithuanian Nationalist Union	LTS	28,744	2.20	0	1	1
Lithuanian Democratic Party	LDP	28,744	2.20	0	2	2
Liberal Union of Lithuania	LLS	25,279	1.93	0	1	1
Lithuanian Peasants Party	LVP	22,826	1.75	0	1	1
Union of the Russians of Lithuania		22,395	1.71	0	0	0
Lithuanian Union of Political Prisoners and Deportees	LPKTS	20,580	1.57	0	1	1
Lithuanian Liberty Union		20,511	1.57	0	0	0
Lithuanian Party of Economy		16,475	1.26	0	0	0
Lithuanian Liberty League		12,562	0.96	0	0	0
Lithuanian Social Justice Union		12,234	0.94	0	0	0
Lithuanian Socialist Party		9,985	0.76	0	0	0
Republican Party		5,063	0.39	0	0	0
National Progress Party		3,922	0.30	0	0	0
Lithuanian Party Life's Logic		3,361	0.26	0	0	0
Lithuanian Peoples Party		2,622	0.26	0	0	0
Independence Party		–	–	–	0	0
Independents		0	0	0	4	4
Invalid/blank votes		67,751	4.9	–	–	–
Total		1,374,673	100	70	67	137
Registered voters/turnout		2,597,530	52.9	–	–	–

== Activities ==
Speaker of the Seimas

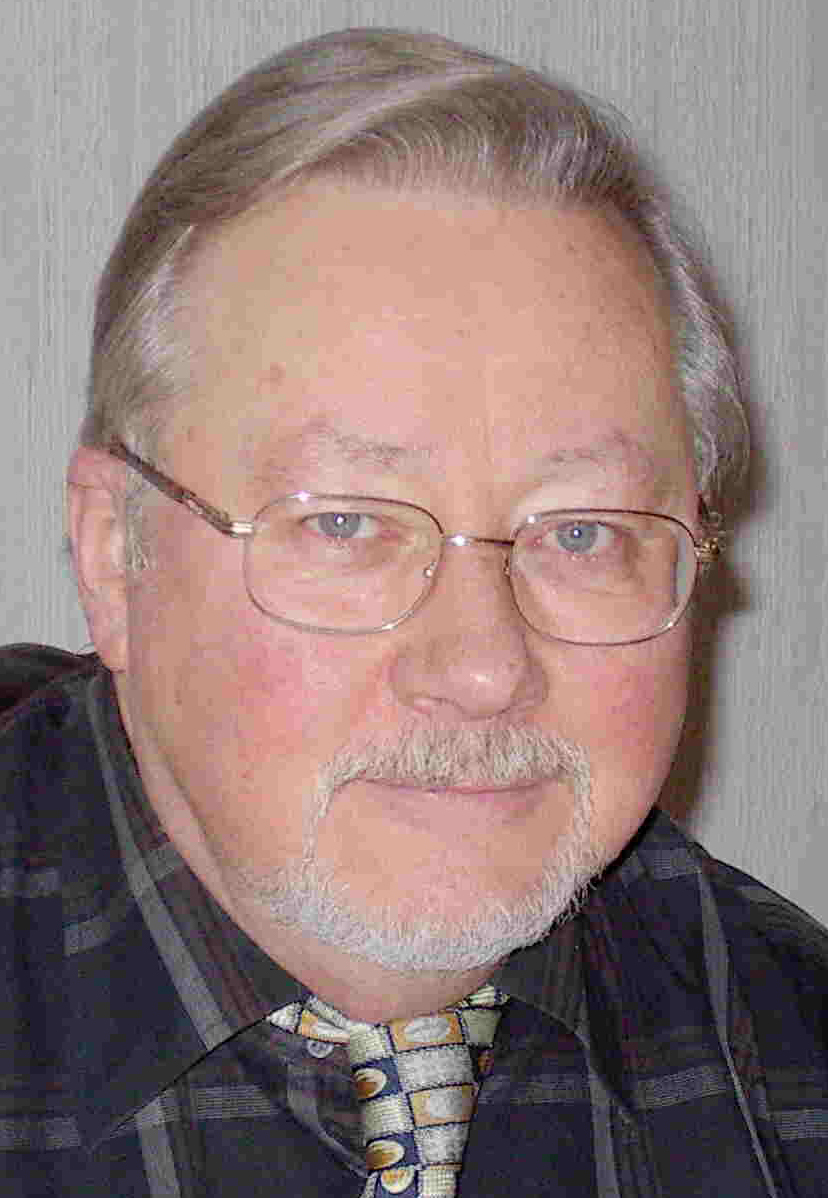
Vytautas Landsbergis (Homeland Union)
25 November 1996 - 18 October 2000

Vytautas Landsbergis was elected as the Speaker of the Seventh Seimas and served throughout the term.

The Seventh Seimas laid the foundations for parliamentary control in Lithuania. By this term, institution, Special Investigation Service, designed for anticorruption activities, was established. Also amendments of Constitution, which considered Euroatlantic integration, were passed.

The Seimas and the Government also proceeded with the privatization of large public enterprises.

== Composition ==
=== Parliamentary groups ===
During the first session of the Seimas the following parliamentary groups were registered: Homeland Union - Lithuanian Conservatives, Christian Democrats, Center, Democratic Labour Party of Lithuania, Social Democrats, Joint Group (Joint Group of the Peasants' party, the Christian Democratic Union and the National Party "Young Lithuania"), Independent Group and the Mixed Group of Members of the Seimas.

Several splits occurred during the term. In late 1998 Laima Andrikienė and Vidmantas Žiemelis were ejected from Homeland Union - Lithuanian Conservatives. They were followed by another 10 parliament members who formed the parliamentary group of Moderate Conservatives in 2000. In the same year, Modern Christian Democrats (4 members) split from the Christian Democrats and Social Democracy 2000s (4 members at the time) split from the Social Democrats. However, similarly to the Sixth Seimas, the Seventh Seimas saw few defections across ideological borders, due to the vast gulf between ruling and opposition parties.

By the end of the term of the Seimas, the following parliamentary groups were active.

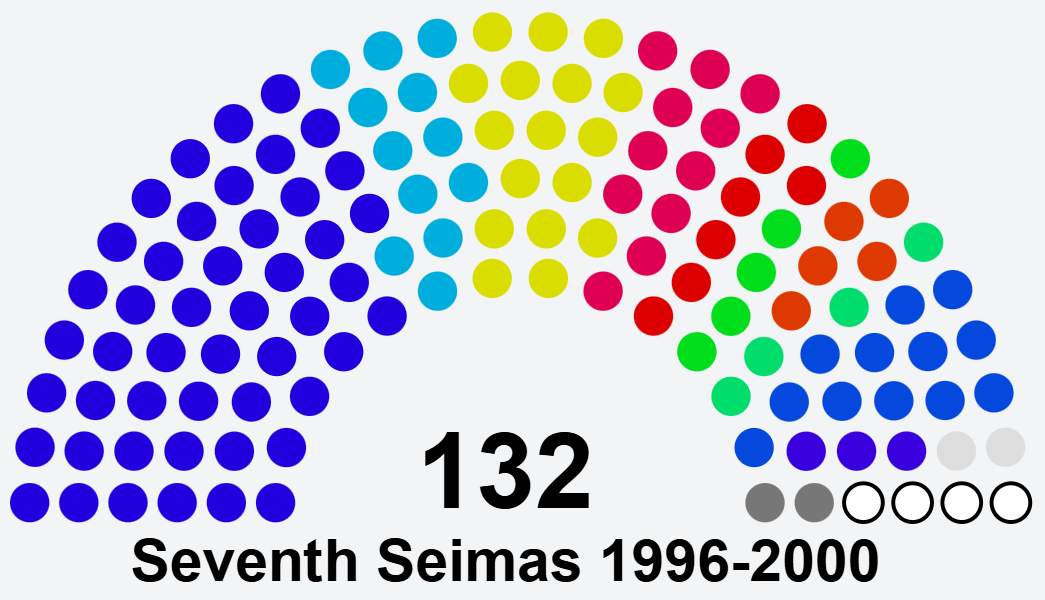

Name	Abbr.	Members
Homeland Union - Lithuanian Conservatives	TSLK	48
Christian Democrats	KDF	12
Center	CF	17
Democratic Labour Party of Lithuania	LDDPF	11
Social Democrats	SDF	7
Joint Group of the Peasants' party, the Christian Democratic Union and the National Party "Young Lithuania"	JF	5
Social Democracy 2000s	S 2000	5
Modern Christian Democrats	MKD	4
Moderate Conservatives	NKF	12
Joint Group of the Democratic Party and the National People's Party	DF	3
Independent Group	NF	2
Others	MSNG	2
Vacant		4

=== Members ===
A total of 151 members were elected to the Seventh Seimas (Virgilijus Bulovas and Naglis Puteikis were elected but did not take their seats), including 126 men and 25 women. Seimas had 137 members at the end of the term, as no new elections would take place in single-seat constituencies with less than 6 months of the term left.

Name, Surname	Electoral list	Constituency	Parliamentary group	Notes
Arvydas Akstinavičius	LSDP	Nationwide	SDF; S 2000 (From 19 December 1999)	
Vilija Aleknaitė-Abramikienė	TSLK	Tauragės	TSLK	
Raimundas Alekna	TSLK	Nationwide	TSLK	from 5 March 1997
Danutė Aleksiūnienė	LCS	Trakų	CF	From 23 April 1997
Ignas Aleškevičius	TSLK	Nationwide		until 4 February 1997
Nijolė Ambrazaitytė	TSLK	Nationwide	TSLK	
Laima Andrikienė	TSLK	Pramonės	TSLK; MSNG (from 1 January 1999); DF (from 2 May 2000)	
Vytenis Andriukaitis	LSDP	Žirmūnų	SDF	
Alfonsas Andriuškevičius	TSLK	Nationwide	TSLK	From 24 April 1997
Jonas Avyžius	TSLK	Nationwide	TSLK	Until 7 July 1999
Audronius Ažubalis	TSLK	Fabijoniškių	TSLK	
Alfonsas Bartkus	TSLK	Šilalės Šilutės	TSLK; NKF (from 28 March 2000)	
Julius Beinortas	LKDP	Nationwide	KDF	
Juozas Bernatonis	LDDP	Nationwide	LDDPF	From 1 May 1998
Egidijus Bičkauskas	LCS	Justiniškių	CF	
Kazys Bobelis	LKDS	Marijampolės	JF	
Vytautas Bogušis	LKDP	Nationwide	KDF; MKDF (from 23 December 1999)	
Mindaugas Briedis	TSLK	Radviliškio	TSLK	
Virgilijus Vladislovas Bulovas	LDDP	Nationwide		From 1 April 1998 until 1 May 1998
Sigita Burbienė	LDDP	Nationwide	LDDPF	
Stanislovas Buškevičius	JL	Kalniečių	JF	
Algirdas Butkevičius	LSDP	Vilkaviškio	SDF	
Audrius Butkevičius	Independent	Naujamiesčio	CF; MSNG (from 15 June 1999)	
Vytautas Aleksandras Cinauskas	TSLK	Nationwide	TSLK	
Algis Čaplikas	LCS	Nationwide	CF	
Vytautas Čepas	LCS	Nationwide	CF	
Sigitas Čirba	TSLK	Nationwide	TSLK	
Regimantas Čiupaila	LCS	Nationwide	CF	
Rimantas Dagys	LSDP	Nationwide	SDF; S 2000 (from 19 December 1999)	
Sofija Daubaraitė	TSLK	Nationwide	TSLK	
Irena Degutienė	TSLK	Nationwide	TSLK	
Rimantas Didžiokas	TSLK	Baltijos	TSLK	
Roma Dovydėnienė	LSDP	Nationwide	SDF	
Juozas Dringelis	TSLK	Nationwide	TSLK	
Vytautas Dudėnas	TSLK	Nationwide	TSLK	
Jadvyga Dunauskaitė	TSLK	Akmenės	TSLK	
Vytautas Einoris	LDDP	Nationwide	LDDPF	
Juozas Galdikas	TSLK	Lazdijų Druskininkų	TSLK	
Povilas Gylys	LDDP	Nationwide	LDDPF	
Vincas Girnius	TSLK	Nationwide	TSLK	Until 4 February 1997
Kęstutis Glaveckas	LCS	Alytaus	CF	
Petras Gražulis	LKDP	Nationwide	KDF	
Arūnas Grumadas	LCS	Nationwide	CF	
Romualda Hofertienė	TSLK	Marių	TSLK	
Gražina Imbrasienė	TSLK	Nationwide	TSLK	
Žibartas Juozas Jackūnas	TSLK	Nationwide	TSLK	
Kęstutis Jakelis	TSLK	Nationwide	TSLK	From 18 July 1999
Vladimir Jarmolenko	TSLK	Dainavos	TSLK	Until 21 November 1999
Česlovas Juršėnas	LDDP	Nationwide	LDDPF	
Sigitas Kaktys	TSLK	Mažeikių	TSLK	
Ramūnas Karbauskis	Independent	Šiaulių kaimiškoji	JF	
Justinas Karosas	LDDP	Nationwide	LDDPF	
Algis Kašėta	LKDP	Varėnos Eišiškių	KDF; MSNG (from 14 December 1999); MKDF (from 23 December 1999)	
Povilas Katilius	LKDP	Nationwide	KDF	
Juozapas Algirdas Katkus	TSLK	Nationwide	TSLK	
Gediminas Kirkilas	LDDP	Nationwide	LDDPF	
Vytautas Petras Knašys	TSLK	Raseinių	TSLK	
Mindaugas Končius	LCS	Nationwide	CF	
Kazimieras Vytautas Kryževičius	LKDP	Nationwide	KDF	
Andrius Kubilius	TSLK	Nationwide	TSLK	
Saulius Kubiliūnas	TSLK	Nationwide	TSLK	From 17 November 1997
Elvyra Janina Kunevičienė	TSLK	Lazdynų	TSLK; NKF (from 28 March 2000)	
Rytas Kupčinskas	TSLK	Aleksoto Vilijampolės	TSLK	
Bronislavas Juozas Kuzmickas	TSLK	Gargždų	TSLK	
Kazimieras Kuzminskas	LKDP	Panemunės	KDF	
Vytautas Landsbergis	TSLK	Kauno kaimiškoji	TSLK	
Vaclovas Lapė	TSLK	Skuodo Mažeikių	TSLK	
Mečys Laurinkus	TSLK	Nevėžio	TSLK	Until 1 July 1998
Juozas Listavičius	TSLK	Kelmės	TSLK; NKF (from 28 March 2000)	
Zygmunt Mackevič	TSLK	Nationwide	TSLK	
Stasys Malkevičius	TSLK	Pajūrio	TSLK	
Virginijus Martišauskas	Independent	Šilutės	CF	
Jūratė Matekonienė	LTS and LDP	Jonavos	CF	
Antanas Matulas	TSLK	Pasvalio Panevėžio	TSLK	
Alvydas Medalinskas	Independent	Šeškinės	LRF; MSNG (from 1 January 1999)	
Nikolaj Medvedev	LSDP	Pakruojo Joniškio	SDF	
Rasa Melnikienė	LCS	Nationwide	CF	
Gabriel Jan Mincevič	LLRA	Širvintų Vilniaus	NF	
Jonas Mocartas	TSLK	Nationwide	TSLK; MSNG (from 1 February 2000); NKF (from 28 March 2000)	From 4 February 1997
Juozas Olekas	LSDP	Suvalkijos	SDF	
Romualdas Ozolas	LCS	Dzūkijos	CF	
Nijolė Oželytė	TSLK	Nationwide	TSLK (until 27 December 1999); NKF (from 28 March 2000)	
Vytautas Pakalniškis	TSLK	Nationwide	TSLK; NKF (from 28 March 2000)	
Feliksas Palubinskas	LKDP	Centro	KDF; MKDF (from 19 January 2000)	
Petras Papovas	LDDP	Zarasų-Visagino	LDDPF	
Algirdas Vaclovas Patackas	LKDP	Nationwide	KDF	
Dainius Petras Paukštė	LSDP	Nationwide	S 2000	From 9 April 2000
Saulius Pečeliūnas	LTS and LDP	Kaišiadorių-Elektrėnų	MSNG; DF (from 2 May 2000)	
Simas Ramutis Petrikis	TSLK	Nationwide	TSLK	
Elena Petrošienė	TSLK	Nationwide	TSLK	
Algirdas Petrusevičius	TSLK	Nationwide	TSLK	
Rimantas Pleikys	TSLK	Senamiesčio	TSLK; NKF (from 28 March 2000)	
Artur Plokšto	LDDP	Nationwide	LDDPF	
Zigmantas Pocius	TSLK	Nationwide	TSLK	Until 3 November 1997
Mykolas Pronckus	LDDP	Nationwide	LDDPF	
Kazimira Prunskienė	LMP	Molėtų Švenčionių	NF	
Naglis Puteikis	TSLK	Nationwide	TSLK	From 4 February 1997 until 24 April 1997
Antanas Račas	TSLK	Jurbarko	TSLK	
Raimundas Leonas Rajeckas	TSLK	Aukštaitijos	TSLK	Until 20 August 1997
Rasa Rastauskienė	TSLK	Anykščių Kupiškio	TSLK	
Arimantas Juvencijus Raškinis	LKDP	Nationwide	KDF	
Jurgis Razma	TSLK	Nationwide	TSLK	
Rūta Rutkelytė	LCS	Nationwide	CF	
Liudvikas Sabutis	TSLK	Plungės	TSLK	
Joana Danguolė Sadeikienė	TSLK	Žaliakalnio	TSLK	
Aloyzas Sakalas	LSDP	Antakalnio	SDF	
Algimantas Salamakinas	LDDP	Kėdainių	LDDPF	
Algirdas Saudargas	LKDP	Karoliniškių	KDF	
Algimantas Sėjūnas	TSLK	Aušros	TSLK	
Jan Sienkiewicz	LLRA	Vilniaus - Šalčininkų	NF	From 23 March 1997
Romualdas Sikorskis	TSLK	Nationwide	TSLK	Until 5 March 1997
Algirdas Sysas	LSDP	Nationwide	SDF	
Kęstutis Skrebys	TSLK	Vakarinė	TSLK; NKF (from 28 March 2000)	
Sigitas Slavickas	TSLK	Nationwide	TSLK	
Rimantas Smetona	LTS and LDP	Ukmergės	JF	
Stasys Stačiokas	TSLK	Nationwide	TSLK	Until 18 March 1999
Česlovas Stankevičius	LKDP	Nationwide	KDF	
Laurynas Stankevičius	LDDP	Nationwide	LDDPF	Until 31 March 1998
Antanas Napoleonas Stasiškis	TSLK	Nationwide	TSLK	
Alfredas Henrikas Stasiulevičius	TSLK	Nationwide	TSLK	
Vida Stasiūnaitė	LSDP	Nationwide	SDF; MSNG (from 1 January 1999)	Until 8 April 2000
Ona Suncovienė	TSLK	Nationwide	TSLK	
Rimvydas Raimondas Survila	TSLK	Nationwide	TSLK	From 19 March 1999
Petras Šakalinis	TSLK	Nationwide	TSLK	
Petras Antanas Šalčius	TSLK	Rokiškio	TSLK	
Saulius Šaltenis	TSLK	Nationwide	TSLK; NKF (from 28 March 2000)	
Kazimieras Šavinis	LCS	Dainų	CF	
Marija Šerienė	LKDP	Nationwide	KDF; MKDF(from 23 December 1999)	
Irena Šiaulienė	LDDP	Nationwide	LDDPF	
Gintaras Šileikis	LCS	Nationwide	CF	
Jonas Šimėnas	LKDP	Utenos	KDF	
Albertas Šimėnas	LKDP	Nationwide	KDF	
Virginijus Šmigelskas	LCS	Nationwide	CF	From 15 May 2000
Antanas Švitra	LPKTS	Kretingos	MSNG	
Kęstutis Trapikas	LLS	Ignalinos Švenčionių	LRF; CF (from 1 January 1999)	
Sigitas Urbonas	TSLK	Prienų	TSLK	
Ignacas Stasys Uždavinys	LKDP	Nationwide	KDF	
Gediminas Vagnorius	TSLK	Telšių	TSLK; NKF (from 28 March 2000)	
Alfonsas Vaišnoras	TSLK	Šilainių	TSLK; MSNG (from 1 February 2000); NKF (from 28 March 2000)	
Kęstutis Vaitukaitis	LCS	Nationwide	CF	Until 14 May 2000
Albinas Vaižmužis	LVP	Biržų Kupiškio	NF	
Jonas Valatka	LSDP	Nationwide	SDF; S 2000 (from 19 December 1999)	
Virmantas Velikonis	LDDP	Aukštaitijos	LDDPF	From 21 December 1997
Arvydas Vidžiūnas	TSLK	Šakių	TSLK	
Vladas Vilimas	TSLK	Kauno Kėdainių	TSLK	
Birutė Teodora Visokavičienė	TSLK	Saulės	TSLK; NKF (from 28 March 2000)	
Vytenis Albertas Zabukas	TSLK	Danės	TSLK	
Emanuelis Zingeris	TSLK	Nationwide	TSLK	
Rolandas Zuoza	LSDP	Nationwide	SDF; S 2000 (from 14 December 1999)	
Vidmantas Žiemelis	TSLK	Nationwide	TSLK; MSNG (from 1 January 1999); DF (from 2 May 2000)	
Algis Žvaliauskas	TSLK	Nationwide	TSLK (until 11 May 2000)	
