= Stankevičius Cabinet =

- 1996
- Date formed: 19 March 1996
- Date dissolved: 10 December 1996

People and organisations
- Head of state: Algirdas Brazauskas
- Head of government: Laurynas Stankevičius
- Member parties: Democratic Labour Party of Lithuania
- Status in legislature: Minority
- Opposition parties: Homeland Union, Lithuanian Christian Democratic Party, Lithuanian Nationalist Union, Democratic Party, Freedom of Political Prisoners and Deportees
- Opposition leader: Vytautas Landsbergis

History
- Legislature term: Sixth Seimas
- Predecessor: Šleževičius Cabinet
- Successor: Vagnorius Cabinet II

The Stankevičius Cabinet was the 7th cabinet of Lithuania since 1990. It consisted of the Prime Minister and 19 government ministers.

Laurynas Stankevičius of the Democratic Labour Party of Lithuania was appointed the Prime Minister by President Algirdas Brazauskas on 23 February 1996, after the previous Prime Minister, Adolfas Šleževičius, was dismissed by the parliament in wake of a financial scandal. The government received its mandate and started its work on 19 March 1996, after the Seimas gave assent to its program.

The government served until the end of the term of the Sixth Seimas, returning its mandate in October 1996. The government continued to serve in an acting capacity until the new government headed by Gediminas Vagnorius started its work on 10 December 1996.

== Cabinet ==
The following ministers served on the Stankevičius Cabinet.

Position	Name	From	To
Prime Minister	Laurynas Stankevičius	19 March 1996	10 December 1996
Ministry of Agriculture	Vytautas Einoris	19 March 1996	10 December 1996
Ministry of Culture	Juozas Nekrošius	19 March 1996	10 December 1996
Ministry of Economy	Antanas Kaminskas	19 March 1996	10 December 1996
Ministry of Education and Science	Vladislavas Domarkas	19 March 1996	10 December 1996
Ministry of Environmental Protection	Bronius Bradauskas	19 March 1996	10 December 1996
Ministry of Finance	Algimantas Križinauskas	19 March 1996	10 December 1996
Ministry of Foreign Affairs	Povilas Gylys	19 March 1996	10 December 1996
Ministry of Health	Antanas Vinkus	19 March 1996	10 December 1996
Ministry of the Interior	Virgilijus Vladislovas Bulovas	19 March 1996	10 December 1996
Ministry of Justice	Jonas Prapiestis (Note: Papiestis resigned on March 17 before the government program received the assent of the Seimas and the government could start its work.)		
Ministry of Justice	Albertas Valys	23 April 1996	10 December 1996
Ministry of Defence	Linas Linkevičius	19 March 1996	10 December 1996
Ministry of Social Security and Labour	Mindaugas Mikaila	19 March 1996	10 December 1996
Ministry of Transport and Communications	Jonas Biržiškis	19 March 1996	10 December 1996
Ministry of Government Reforms and Municipalities	Petras Papovas	19 March 1996	10 December 1996
Ministry of Energy	Saulius Kutas	19 March 1996	10 December 1996
Ministry of Forestry	Albertas Vasiliauskas	19 March 1996	10 December 1996
Ministry of Industry and Trade	Kazimieras Klimašauskas	19 March 1996	10 December 1996
Ministry of Communications and Informatics	Vaidotas Abraitis	19 March 1996	10 December 1996
Ministry of Construction and Urbanistics	Aldona Baranauskienė	19 March 1996	10 December 1996
