= Vanda Briedienė =

Lithuanian politician

Vanda Briedienė (13 January 1932 – 27 April 2013) was a Lithuanian economist, politician and member of the Seimas.

== Biography ==
Briedienė was born in Biržai, Lithuania on 13 January 1932. In 1949 her family was deported to Siberia where she stayed until 1957.

In 1960 Briedienė graduated from the Institute of Finance and Economics in Moscow. In 1968 she received a PhD in economics from Vilnius University and started teaching at the university. She subsequently worked at the Institute of Professional Development, Lithuanian Institute of Physical Education and Kaunas Academy of Medicine until 1992.

A member, of the Lithuanian Union of Political Prisoners and Deportees (LPKTS) since 1991, Briedienė was elected as the member of the Sixth Seimas in the elections in 1992, through the joint electoral list of Lithuanian Christian Democratic Party, LPKTS and the Lithuanian Democratic Party. She ran for Seimas seat again in the elections of 2000 and 2004, representing Lithuanian Nationalist Union.
