= Vytautas Bogušis =

Lithuanian politician

Vytautas Bogušis (born 2 January 1959) is a Lithuanian politician and former member of the Seimas.

== Biography ==
Bogušis was born in Puvočiai village, Varėna district, Lithuania on 2 January 1959.

Bogušis was an active member of the Christian and anti-Soviet resistance movements, resulting in his expulsion from high school in 1976. He participated in publishing underground newspapers and otherwise raising awareness about human right violations by the Soviet authorities. Bogušis was one of the organizers of popular anti-Soviet rallies in 1987 and 1988.

In 1989 he was among the signatories of the document reestablishing the Lithuanian Christian Democratic Party (LKDP) and became its active member. In 1990 he was elected to the municipal council of Vilnius.

In the elections in 1992, Bogušis was elected as the member of the Sixth Seimas through the joint electoral list of LKDP, the Lithuanian Union of Political Prisoners and Deportees and the Lithuanian Democratic Party. He was reelected to the Seventh Seimas in 1996 through the electoral list of LKDP.

In 2000 Bogušis left LKDP, founding Modern Christian-Democratic Union and serving as its chairman. The party merged with the Liberal Union of Lithuania and the Lithuanian Centre Union to form Liberal and Centre Union (LiCS) in 2003. Bogušis served as the deputy chairman of the party. He served on the municipal council of Vilnius between 2003 and 2004.

Bogušis was again elected to the Seimas in the elections of 2004 through the electoral list of LiCS. He was reelected to the Tenth Seimas in the 2008, with LiCS becoming part of the coalition government. Bogušis left the Liberal and Centre Union in 2013.

Bogušis also a served on the electoral campaigns of Stasys Lozoraitis Jr. (in 1993) and Valdas Adamkus (in 1997).
