= Vytautas Astrauskas (physician) =

Lithuanian physician and politician

Vytautas Astrauskas (23 March 1927 – 26 August 2004) was a Lithuanian physician, medical researcher, politician and former member of the Seimas.

== Biography ==
Astrauskas was born to a peasant family in Maceniai, Plungė district, Lithuania on 23 March 1927. He graduated from the Faculty of Medicine within Vilnius University in 1952 and worked at the Institute of Experimental and Clinical Medicine, initially as a research secretary. Since 1964 he headed the Experimental Pathology Lab at the institute.

Astrauskas became a Doctor of Medicine in 1968 and a professor of medicine in 1972. His research focused on rheumatic disorders. He was one of the first scientists in the Soviet Union to study the pathology of rheumatic fever, developing experimental models for studying the disorder and collaborating in developing treatments for it. He published over 250 research papers (including in immunology, biochemistry and philosophy), registered 29 inventions, published reference books and textbooks.

In 1955, he joined the Communist Party of Lithuania. After the independence, he joined the ranks of the Democratic Labour Party of Lithuania (LDDP) and, in the elections in 1992 he was elected as the member of the Sixth Seimas in the single-seat constituency of Antakalnis (3), Vilnius. When he ran again in 1996, as a Christian Democrat, he was not successful.

Astrauskas died on 26 August 2004.
