= Albinas Albertynas =

Lithuanian politician

Albinas Albertynas (28 February 1934 – 26 May 2005) was a Lithuanian politician and former member of the Seimas.

== Biography ==
Albertynas was born to a peasant family in Kampiškiai village, Vilkaviškis district, Lithuania on 28 February 1934. In 1944, he retreated with his family to Germany from the approaching Eastern front, but returned to its lands after the war.

In 1950 Albertynas enrolled with the Kaunas gardening technical school. 1952 he was arrested and sentenced to 10 years of incarceration for breach of Article 58 of the penal code. Albertynas was released in 1954, after the death of Josef Stalin, and continued his studies. In 1961 he started working on a collective farm in Marijampolė district and worked there for the next thirty years.

With Lithuania moving towards independence, Albertynas started participating in the activities of Sąjūdis.

In the elections in 1992, Albertynas was elected as the member of the Sixth Seimas in the single-seat constituency of Jurbarkas (62). Although not a member of any party, he was endorsed in the elections by the Democratic Labour Party of Lithuania.

Albertynas died on 26 May 2005.
