= Juozas Bulavas =

Lithuanian politician

Juozas Bulavas (12 January 1909 – 29 July 1995) was a Lithuanian scholar, academic, political and social figure, and member of the Seimas.

== Biography ==
Bulavas was born to a peasant family in Ginotai village, in what is now Rokiškis District, Lithuania, on 12 January 1909.

Bulavas studied at the Faculty of Law of the Vytautas Magnus University in Kaunas. He finished his studies at the Department of Law in 1931 and the Department of Economics a year later, but would only receive his diploma in 1940, due to his political activities.

In 1940 Bulavas started working at Vilnius University and was appointed a Pro-rector later that year. In 1941 he received his PhD and was appointed a professor, teaching government law. Under the German occupation, Bulavas was dismissed from the university and worked as a teacher in Utena and Rokiškis. He returned to the university in 1944.

In 1956 Bulavas was appointed the Rector of Vilnius University. As a rector, he sought to introduce more Lithuanians into the faculty and to protect it from Russian influences. As a result of his efforts, he was dismissed from the role in 1958. Bulavas continued working at the Lithuanian Academy of Sciences in a scientific and management capacity.

Bulavas was a member of the Communist Party of Lithuania (then illegal in Lithuania) between 1931 and 1938 and, again, from 1952. Between 1950 and 1954 he served on the Vilnius City Council. In 1959 Bulavas was dismissed from the party for his nationalist policies as the Rector of Vilnius University. In 1988 he was one of the founders of the pro-independence Sąjūdis movement and, upon independence, was one of the key authors of the Constitution of Lithuania, participating in its drafting during 1990–1991. Between 1989 and 1991 he was the Chairman of the Lithuanian Election Commission.

In 1991, Bulavas joined the ranks of Democratic Labour Party of Lithuania (LDDP). In the elections in 1992, he represented LDDP and was elected as the member of the Sixth Seimas through its electoral list. Bulavas died in office on 20 July 1995.

In 1994 he was awarded the Order of the Lithuanian Grand Duke Gediminas.
