= Juozas Baranauskas =

Lithuanian politician (1935–2021)

Juozas Gediminas Baranauskas
- Born: 30 March 1935; Kaunas, Lithuania
- Died: 2 July 2021 (aged 86); Vilnius, Lithuania
- Occupations: TV anchor, politician

Juozas Gediminas Baranauskas (30 March 1935 – 2 July 2021) was a Lithuanian TV anchor and politician who served as member of the Seimas.

== Biography ==
Baranauskas was born in Kaunas, Lithuania on 30 March 1935. In 1954 he started his studies at the Faculty of Law within Vilnius University. In his second year of studies, Baranauskas won the competition to become an announcer on the national radio.

In 1957, Baranauskas won the competition to become the first TV announcer on the newly established national TV station. Together with Gražina Bigelytė, he appeared on the very first national broadcast on 30 April 1957. At the time, there were only 32 TV sets in Lithuanian SSR to receive the broadcast, although the number increased to more than 1500 by the end of 1957. Baranauskas worked for the national broadcaster for almost 40 years.

Baranauskas was a member of the Communist Party of Lithuania. After the independence, he joined the ranks of the Democratic Labour Party of Lithuania (LDDP) and, in the elections in 1992, was elected as the member of the Sixth Seimas in the single-seat constituency of Akmenė-Joniškis (39).

Baranauskas died on 2 July 2021 aged 86.
