= Antanas Baskas =

Lithuanian politician

- Born: 22 February 1936 (age 90); Marijampolė, Lithuania
- Occupations: Computer scientist, Politician

Antanas Baskas (born 22 February 1936 in Marijampolė, Lithuania) is a Lithuanian computer scientist, politician and former member of the Seimas.

== Biography ==
Baskas was born to a working-class family in Marijampolė, Lithuania on 22 February 1936.

Baskas graduated from the Kaunas Polytechnic Institute in 1960. He worked at the Vilnius Construction Bureau for Computational Machines, first as technician, later - as an engineer and a manager. In 1966 Baskas became an engineer and, later, research fellow at the Lithuanian Academy of Sciences. Between 1977 and 1992 he worked at the Institute of Mathematics and Informatics. He successfully defended his doctoral dissertation in 1973. Baskas has published around 40 research papers and authored hundreds of articles in Lithuanian press in the areas of technology and politics.

In 1990 Baskas joined the Liberal Union of Lithuania and remained a member until 1992. In the elections in 1992, Baskas was elected as the member of the Sixth Seimas on the electoral list of Democratic Labour Party of Lithuania. He was a member of Social Democratic Party of Lithuania between 1994 and 1996. He ran unsuccessfully for a Seimas seat in 1996, 2000, 2004 and 2008.

After leaving the Seimas in 1996, he continued his work at the Institute of Mathematics and Informatics of Vilnius University.
