= Antanas Būdvytis =

Lithuanian politician

Antanas Būdvytis (16 August 1928 – 13 January 1998) was a Soviet and Lithuanian agronomist, politician and member of the Seimas.

== Biography ==
Būdvytis was born to a peasant family in Jonikaičiai village, Klaipėda County, Lithuania on 16 August 1928.

After graduating from the Academy of Agriculture in 1951, Būdvytis briefly worked as an agronomist on a collective farm. In 1952 he started working in the Lithuanian Academy of Sciences, later - Lithuanian Institute of Agriculture. In 1960 Būdvytis was awarded a doctoral degree in agriculture. He continued working at the Institute of Agriculture until 1989, becoming its director in 1966. He held this position for 23 years, during which time he was elected a member of the Soviet Union Academy of Sciences. A prominent agronomist, Būdvytis published 150 scientific papers and many articles on popular science and social matters. Antanas Budvytis was elected a member of the Soviet Union of journalists.

Būdvytis was a member of the Communist Party of the Soviet Union, joining Democratic Labour Party of Lithuania (LDDP) after independence. In the elections in 1992, Būdvytis represented LDDP and was elected as the member of parliament Sixth Seimas through its electoral list.

Būdvytis died in on 13 January 1998.

1972 m. birželio 14 d. awarded the title of distinguished agronomist of Lithuania.
1976 m. lapkričio 4 d. awarded a USSR state prize for achievements in agricultural science.
1988 m. gruodžio 19 d. awarded the title of distinguished agronomist of the Soviet Union.
