= Zenonas Petras Adomaitis =

Lithuanian politician (born 1945)

Zenonas Petras Adomaitis (born 10 April 1945 in Kelmė district, Lithuania) is a Lithuanian politician and former member of the Seimas.

== Biography ==
Adomaitis was born to a peasant family in Stulgiai village, Kelmė district on 10 April 1945. In 1963 Adomaitis graduated from Tytuvėnai agricultural school and worked as a zootechnician in several collective farms. In 1973 he became the head of a collective farm in Kelmė district where he worked until 1991.

Adomaitis was a member of the Communist Party of the Soviet Union from 1973. He joined Democratic Labour Party of Lithuania (LDDP) upon its inception in 1991.

In the elections in 1992, Adomaitis represented LDDP and was elected as the member of the Sixth Seimas in the single-seat constituency of Kelmė (41).
