= Vytautas Arbačiauskas =

Lithuanian politician

Vytautas Arbačiauskas (born 13 May 1951 in Prienai, Lithuania) is a Lithuanian politician and former member of the Seimas.

== Biography ==
Arbačiauskas was born to a working-class family in Prienai, Lithuania, on 13 May 1951. He graduated from the Faculty of Natural Sciences of Vilnius University in 1975 and started working as an engineer-geologist.

Arbačiauskas was an active member of the Communist Party of Lithuania and was elected as a member of its presidium. After independence, he joined the ranks of the Democratic Labour Party of Lithuania (LDDP) and, in the elections in 1992, he was elected as the member of the Sixth Seimas through the electoral list of the party. He ran for reelection in 1996, but was not successful, as LDDP suffered a setback in the elections.
