= Leonas Alesionka =

Lithuanian politician

Leonas Alesionka (born 6 January 1949) is a Lithuanian politician and former member of the Seimas.

== Biography ==
Alesionka was born to a working-class family in Švenčionys.

In 1972 Alesionka graduated from Faculty of Medicine within Vilnius University. Between 1973 and 1975 he worked as a doctor of Dermatology and Venereology in Ukmergė. Between 1975 and 1982 he worked as a doctor of Dermatology, Venereology and AIDS at Anykščiai district hospital.

Alesionka joined the activities of Sąjūdis in 1988. In the elections in 1992, he was elected as the member of the Sixth Seimas through the electoral list of Democratic Labour Party of Lithuania.

Alesionka became a member of the Social Democratic Party of Lithuania in 2001. Between 1997 and 2003 he served on the municipal council of Anykščiai District Municipality, between 2000 and 2001 - as its mayor.

In 2010, Alesionka, who had been working as a representative of the Government in Panevėžys County, won 1 million Litas (290 thousand Euros) in a national lottery. In 2012, Alesionka announced his departure from the Social Democratic Party and his intentions to run for a seat in the parliament representing the Republican Party. In the elections later that year, he received less than 7% of the votes in the Anykščiai-Kupiškis single-seat constituency.
