= Aleksandras Bendinskas =

Lithuanian politician

Aleksandras Bendinskas (23 February 1920 – 25 September 2015) was a member of the anti-Soviet resistance in Lithuania and, after the independence of Lithuania, a member of its parliament, Seimas.

== Biography ==
Bendinskas was born to a peasant family in Skersabalis village, Marijampolė district, Lithuania on 23 February 1920.

Bendinskas enrolled in the Technical Faculty at the Vytautas Magnus University in Kaunas in 1938, graduating in 1944. Between 1940 and 1943 he worked as a technician and, later, manager at company Parama. Between 1943 and 1945 Bendinskas also lectured at the Higher Trading School in Kaunas.

In 1941, Bendinskas was an active participant in June Uprising in Lithuania, directed against the occupying Soviet forces. In 1945 the returning Soviet authorities imprisoned Bendinskas for anti-Soviet activities; he remained in Soviet gulags until 1956.

In 1960, Bendinskas graduated from Moscow Institute of Textile as an engineer-technician. Upon returning to Lithuania, he joined the anti-Soviet resistance activities, helping to publish and distribute banned literature and newspapers. Bendinskas worked as a mechanic in various factories, as a constructor in a design and construction bureau and as a craftsman at a vocational school.

Upon Lithuanian independence, he became the first commander of the restored Lithuanian Riflemen's Union. In the elections in 1992, Bendinskas represented the Democratic Labour Party of Lithuania and was elected as the member of the Sixth Seimas through its electoral list.

Bendinskas died on 25 September 2015.
