= Romualdas Ignas Bloškys =

Lithuanian politician

Romualdas Ignas Bloškys (1 February 1936 – 26 April 2013) was a Lithuanian politician and a member of the Seimas.

== Biography ==
Bloškys was born to a family of civil servants in Šiauliai, Lithuania on 1 February 1936.

Bloškys graduated from the Šiauliai Pedagogical Institute in 1960, subsequently teaching physics in a school in Klaipėda. In 1963 he was appointed the headmaster of the Klaipėda Kristijonas Donelaitis School (now Vytautas Magnus Gymnasium).

Bloškys was a member of the Communist Party of Lithuania. After the independence, he joined the ranks of Democratic Labour Party of Lithuania (LDDP). In the elections in 1992, Bloškys represented the LDDP and was elected as the member of the Sixth Seimas through its electoral list. He ran unsuccessfully for reelection in 1996, representing LDDP in the Danė single-seat constituency. After finishing his term in the parliament, Bloškys resumed his work at the Klaipėda Vytautas Magnus School.

Between 1997 and 2000 Bloškys served on the municipal council of Klaipėda.

Bloškys died on 23 April 2013.
