= Vytautas Algimantas Buinevičius =

Lithuanian politician

Vytautas Algimantas Buinevičius (16 February 1933 - 27 July 2005) was a Lithuanian scientist, politician and member of the Seimas.

== Biography ==
Buinevičius was born to a family of teachers in Kaunas, Lithuania on 16 August 1928.

Buinevičius graduated from the Kaunas Polytechnics Institute in 1955, earning a degree in radio engineering. He worked in teaching and researcher capacity first at the Polytechnics Institute and, later, at the Institute of Radio Measurement Technology. His research primarily focused on radio technology and he participated in designing radio measurement devices. He earned his doctoral degree and became a professor in 1982, later working at the Kaunas University of Technology.

Buinevičius was a member of the Communist Party of the Soviet Union from 1959, joining Democratic Labour Party of Lithuania (LDDP) in 1990. In the elections in 1992, Buinevičius represented LDDP and was elected as the member of the Sixth Seimas through its electoral list.

Buinevičius died on 27 July 2005.
