= Arvydas Bajoras =

Lithuanian politician

Arvydas Bajoras (born 15 May 1956 in Merkinė, Lithuania) is a Lithuanian politician and former member of the Seimas.

== Biography ==
Bajoras was born in Merkinė, Varėna district, Lithuania on 15 May 1956. He graduated from the Lithuanian Academy of Agriculture in 1980. Since 1988 he worked as the head of Šunskai collective farm.

Bajoras was an active member of the Communist Party of Lithuania in Marijampolė. After independence, he joined the ranks of the Democratic Labour Party of Lithuania and, in the elections in 1992, he was elected as the member of the Sixth Seimas in the single-seat constituency of Suvalkija (63).
