= Virgilijus Vladislovas Bulovas =

Lithuanian engineer and political figure (1939–2024)

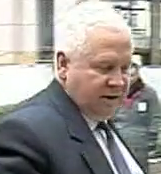

Minister of the Interior
- In office 23 February 1996 – 19 November 1996
- Prime Minister: Laurynas Stankevičius
- Preceded by: Romasis Vaitiekūnas
- Succeeded by: Vidmantas Žiemelis
- In office 13 May 2003 – 14 December 2004
- Prime Minister: Algirdas Brazauskas
- Preceded by: Juozas Bernatonis
- Succeeded by: Gintaras Jonas Furmanavičius

Personal details
- Born: 6 November 1939 Kaunas, Lithuania
- Died: 19 February 2024 (aged 84) Kaunas, Lithuania
- Education: Kaunas Polytechnics Institute

Virgilijus Vladislovas Bulovas (6 November 1939 – 19 February 2024) was a Lithuanian engineer and political figure. Bulovas was a member of the Seimas and twice served on the Government of Lithuania as the Minister of the Interior.

== Biography ==
Bulovas was born to a family of a military officer in Kaunas, Lithuania, on 6 November 1939. In 1941, after Soviet occupation, his father was deported to Siberia, where he later died.

Bulovas graduated from the Kaunas Polytechnics Institute in 1960, with a degree in electrical engineering, specializing in computers. He worked at the Institute until 1992, was awarded a doctorate degree in 1972 and became a docent in 1976. He co-wrote two computer science books and authored more than 50 scientific and educational papers.

Bulovas had been a member of the Communist Party of Lithuania since 1963. Upon independence he joined the ranks of Democratic Labour Party of Lithuania and, in the elections in 1992, was elected as the member of the Sixth Seimas through its electoral list.

In 1996 Bulovas was appointed the Minister of the Interior in the Government of Laurynas Stankevičius and served until the next elections to the Seimas. In 1997, he was appointed the Ambassador to Kazakhstan. Bulovas returned to the Ministry of the Interior in 2001, as a deputy-minister and, later, secretary under Juozas Bernatonis. In 2003 he succeeded Bernatonis as the Minister of the Interior in the Government of Algirdas Brazauskas.

Bulovas died in Kaunas on 19 February 2024, at the age of 84.
