= Bastys =

- Lithuanian surname
- m.: Bastys
- f.: (unmarried): Bastytė
- f.: (married): Bastienė

Bastys is a Lithuanian surname. Notable people with the surname include:

- Juozas Bastys (1934–1994), Lithuanian politician, MP
- Mindaugas Bastys (born 1965), Lithuanian politician, MP
