= Juozas Bastys =

Lithuanian politician

Juozas Bastys (20 November 1934 – 8 October 1994) was a Lithuanian politician and member of the Seimas.

== Biography ==
Bastys was born to a peasant family in Naujokaičiai village, Šakiai district, Lithuania on 20 November 1934.

Bastys graduated from Raudonė high school in 1953 and started working at the editorial team of a newspaper in Jurbarkas district. Between 1954 and 1961 he worked at several schools and youth organizations. In 1961 he became the Manager of Kriūkiai collective farm in Šakiai district, where he worked for the following 30 years. In 1992 he worked as the CEO of agricultural company Agrolina. The company would later be headed by his son and granddaughter.

Bastys was a member of the Communist Party of the Soviet Union, joining Democratic Labour Party of Lithuania (LDDP) after independence. In the elections in 1992, Bastys represented LDDP and was elected as the member of the Sixth Seimas through its electoral list.

Bastys died in office on 8 October 1994. His son, Mindaugas Bastys would later serve as a member of the Seimas.
