= Bajoras =

- Lithuanian surname
- m.: Bajopras
- f.: (unmarried): Bajoraitė
- f.: (married): Bajorienė

Bajoras, literally meaning boyar, is a Lithuanian surname. Notable people with the surname include:

- Arvydas Bajoras (born 1956), Lithuanian politician, MP;
- Feliksas Bajoras (1934–2026), Lithuanian composer.
