= Alvydas Baležentis =

Lithuanian politician

Alvydas Baležentis (born 10 January 1949 in Lazdijai district, Lithuania) is a Lithuanian politician and former member of the Seimas.

== Biography ==
Baležentis was born to a peasant family in Straigiai village, Lazdijai district, Lithuania on 10 January 1949.

In 1967 Baležentis graduated from the Smailininkai Agricultural Mechanization technical school, in 1973 - from Kaunas Polytechnics Institute. In 1979 he became a doctoral candidate in Economics at the University of Moscow. Since 1977 hew worked at the Lithuanian Academy of Agriculture, as an assistant, lecturer, deputy dean, docent and the head of the Innovation Centre at the Academy.

In the elections in 1992, Baležentis was elected as the member of the Sixth Seimas in the single-seat constituency of Lazdijai-Druskininkai (71), representing the Lithuanian Nationalist Union.
