= Kazimieras Antanavičius (economist) =

Lithuanian economist and politician

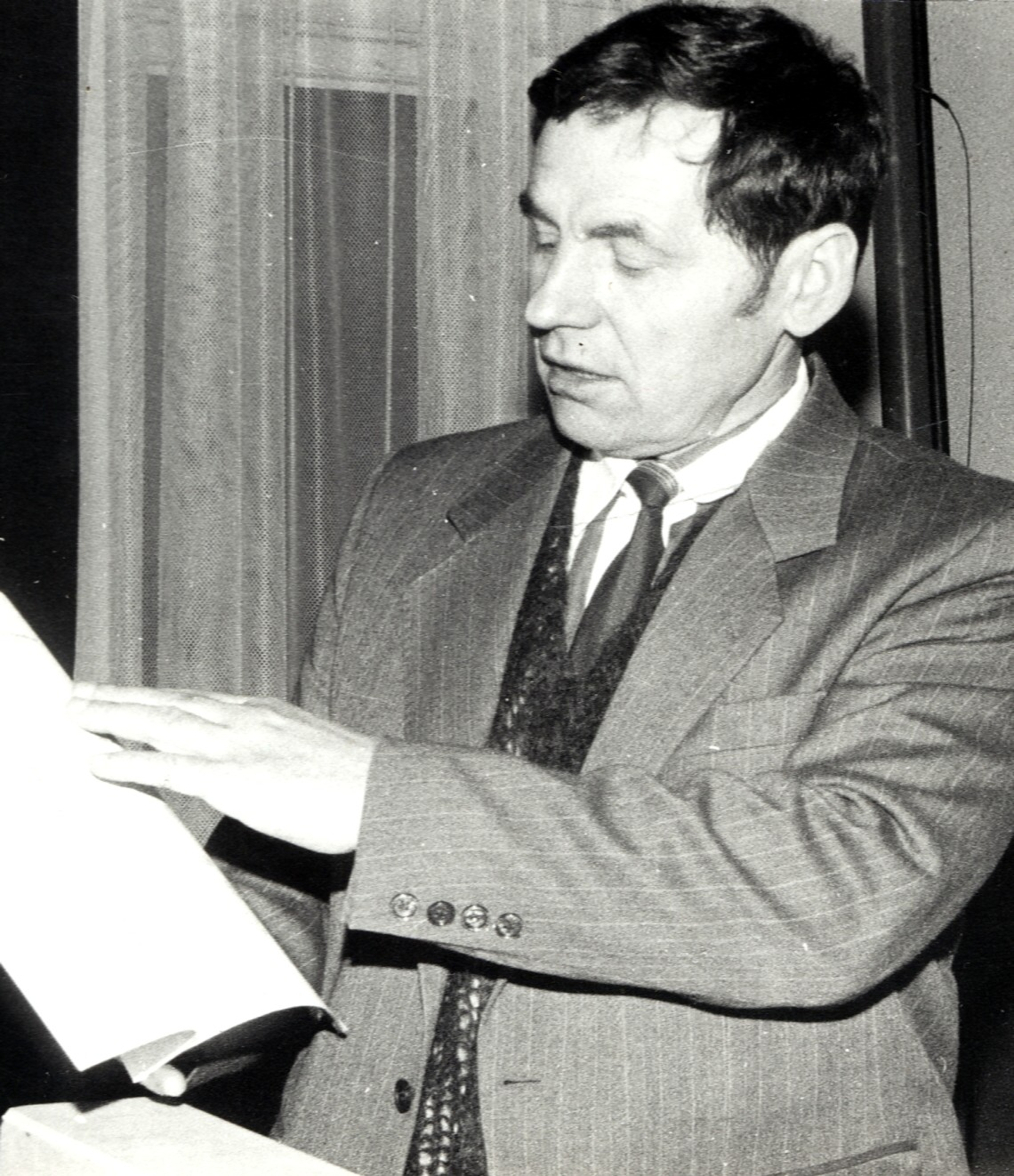
Kazimieras Antanavičius

Kazimieras Antanavičius (25 November 1937 – 16 April 1998) was a Lithuanian economist and politician, signatory of the Act of the Re-Establishment of the State of Lithuania and member of the Seimas.

== Biography ==
Antanavičius was born in Balsėnai village, Kretinga district, Lithuania on 25 November 1937.

In 1959, he graduated with distinction from the Construction Faculty of the Kaunas Polytechnic Institute. In 1968, he started his work at the Vilnius Institute of Engineering Construction, where he would continue working for 20 years. In 1969 he established a laboratory for researching management systems and managed it until 1986. In 1980, he acquired a PhD and became a professor in 1982. In 1986 he joined the Lithuanian Academy of Sciences.

Antanavičius was active in establishing Sąjūdis movement that would eventually lead to independence. He was particularly active in setting the economic policies of Sąjūdis and drafting economic laws. In 1990 he was elected to the Supreme Council of Lithuania and was one of the signatories of the Act of the Re-Establishment of the State of Lithuania. In the elections in 1992, Antanavičius, a member of Social Democratic Party of Lithuania, was elected as the member of the Sixth Seimas in the single-seat constituency of Gargždai (31). In the parliament, he headed the Economics Committee until resigning in 1994, having gotten disillusioned with the parliamentary work. During his term, he drafted more than a hundred laws and proposals.

In 1997, he returned to teaching, lecturing at the Vytautas Magnus University and working at the Lithuanian Academy of Sciences.

Antanavičius died on 16 April 1998.
