= Kazimieras Antanavičius =

Kazimieras Antanavičius may refer to:

- Kazimieras Antanavičius (officer), partisan in the military of Lithuania, recipient of the Order of the Cross of Vytis
- Kazimieras Antanavičius (economist) (1937–1998), signatory of the Act of the Re-Establishment of the State of Lithuania in 1990
