= Jonas Algirdas Antanaitis =

Lithuanian politician (1921–2018)

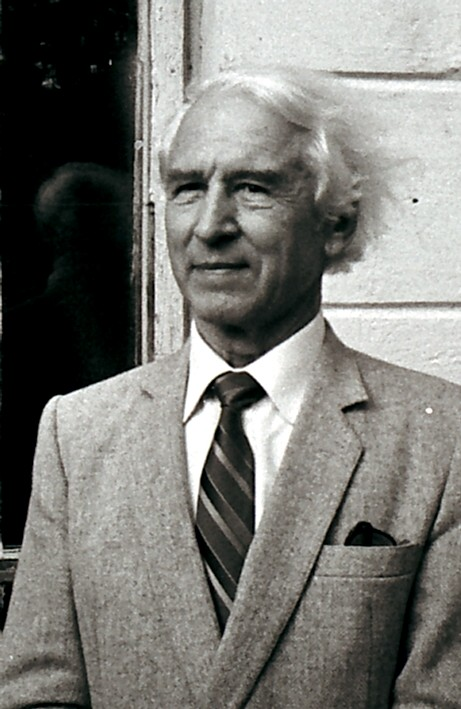
Jonas Antanaitis in August 1992

Jonas Algirdas Antanaitis (19 August 1921 – 7 September 2018) was a Lithuanian politician who was a long-term member of the Seimas.

== Biography ==
Antanaitis was born in Rimšiniai village, Pakruojis district, Lithuania on 19 August 1921. He studied engineering at Vytautas Magnus University.

After the Soviet Union occupied and annexed Lithuania, Antanaitis was a member of the resistance. He was arrested in 1944 and deported to Siberia. He returned to Lithuania in 1954, working as an engineer.

In 1995, Antanaitis became a member of the Sixth Seimas through the electoral list of the Social Democratic Party of Lithuania.
