= Algirdas Pocius =

Lithuanian politician (1930–2021)

Member of the Seimas
- In office 1992–1996

Personal details
- Born: 28 August 1930 Ketūnai, Mažeikiai District Municipality, Lithuania
- Died: 14 August 2021 (aged 90) Vilnius, Lithuania
- Party: CPSU; LDDP

Algirdas Pocius (28 August 1930 – 14 August 2021) was a Lithuanian politician and writer.

== Biography ==
Pocius studied at the Sedos Vytauto Mačernio gimnazija from 1950 to 1952 and subsequently studied Lithuanian and literature at Klaipeda Teachers' Institute. In 1954, he began working as a radio correspondent in Šiauliai. In 1956, he began writing in the fiction section of Švyturys. That year, he joined the Lithuanian Writers' Union. He was Vice-President of the Union from 1981 to 1986.

In 1960, Pocius joined the Communist Party of the Soviet Union. In 1990, he joined the Democratic Labour Party of Lithuania (LDDP) and served in the Seimas from 1992 to 1996.

Algirdas Pocius died on 14 August 2021 at the age of 90.

== Works ==
- Rytmetis Užgirių kaime (1955)
- Žąsies kiaušinis (1959)
- Šešiolika raktų (1960)
- Verpetas (1963)
- Striukis keliauninkas (1964)
- Tik du sūnūs (1966)
- Randai medyje (1968)
- Ištirpę migloje (1972)
- Dobilų žydėjimas (1975)
- Laiškas ant šalpusnio lapo (1977)
- Hommikul, kui vaevas uni (1977)
- Per laukus iki miesto (1979)
- Išskridę iš lizdo (1980)
- Почтальон Теофилис (1981)
- Вкус тмина (1981)
- Liepos šešėlyje (1984)
- Striukis keliauninkas (1984)
- Барбоска (1984)
- Įkaitai (1987)
- Sūpuoklėse (1989)
- Užmarštis (1990)
- Заложники (1990)
- Antros eilės pusbrolis (2000)
- Ekskomisaras (2005)
- Prie piliakalnio (2006)
- Ponia Amnestija (2007)

== Awards ==
- Žemaitės literatūrinė premija for Tik du sūnūs (1967)
- Lietuvos TSR valstybinė premija for Išskridę iš lizdo (1982)
- Juozas Paukštelis Prize for Liepos šešėlyje (1985)
