= Kęstutis Glaveckas =

Lithuanian politician (1949–2021)

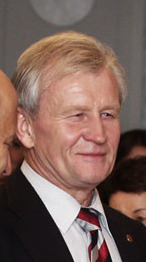
Kęstutis Glaveckas

Kęstutis Glaveckas (30 April 1949 – 30 April 2021) was a Lithuanian politician.

Glaveckas was born and died in Vilnius. In 1990, he was among those who signed the Act of the Re-Establishment of the State of Lithuania.

Seimas
Preceded by Vladimir Jarmolenko	Member of the Seimas for Dainava; 2000–2012	Succeeded by Kazimieras Kuzminskas
