= Independence Party (Lithuania) =

The Independence Party (Lithuanian: Nepriklausomybės partija, NP) was a political party in Lithuania between 1990 and 2001.

== History ==
The party was initially named 11 March Party (Kovo 11-osios partija). It contested the 1992 parliamentary elections in an alliance with the Lithuanian Nationalist Union, winning a single seat. The seat was won by Kęstutis Skrebys, who in 1993 joined the newly-formed Homeland Union leaving the party seatless. It ran alone in the 1996 parliamentary elections, but failed to win a seat.
