= Audrius Rudys =

Lithuanian economist and politician

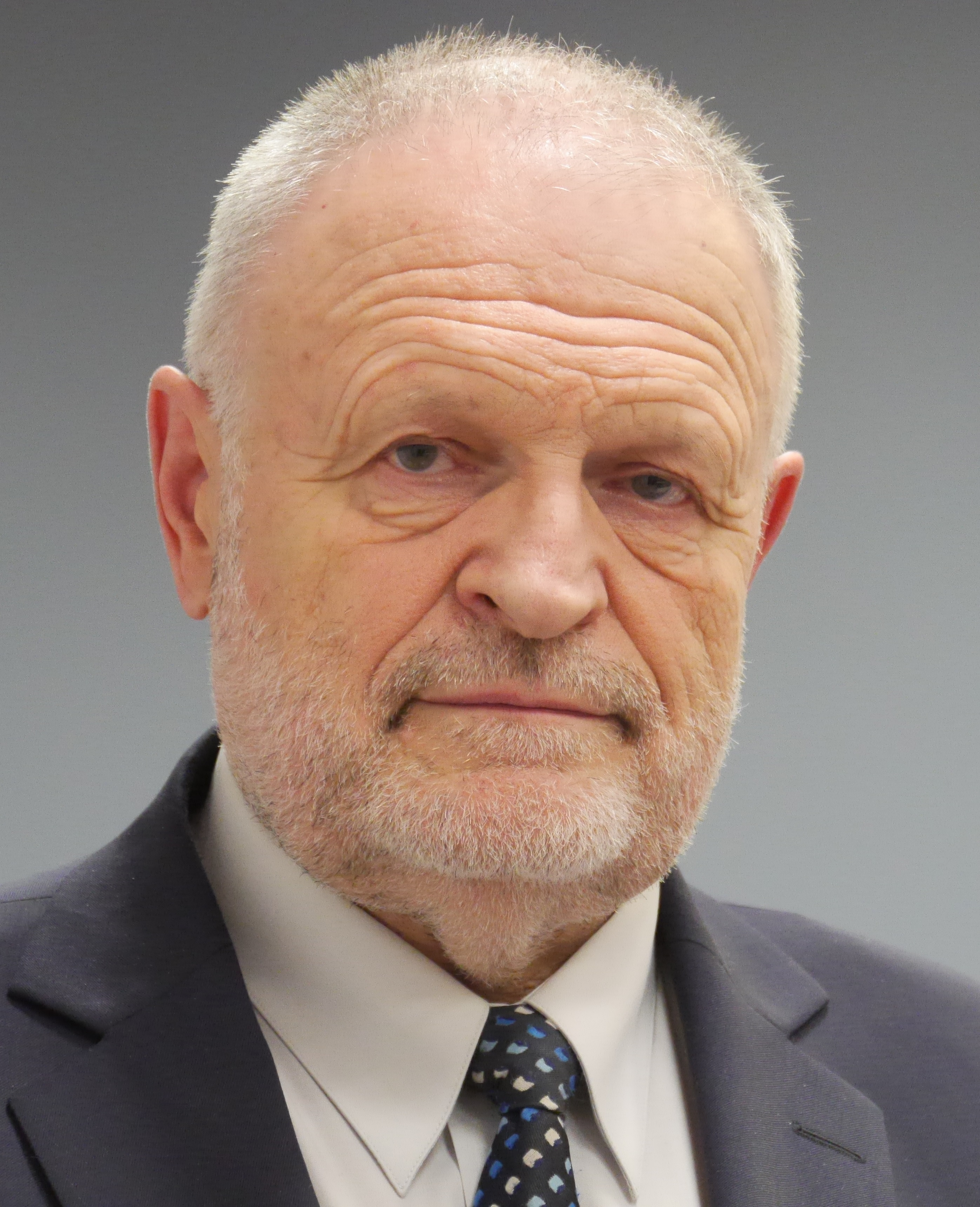

Member of the Seimas
- In office 1990–1996

Chairman of the Lithuanian Nationalist Union
- In office 19 December 2015 – 14 January 2017
- Preceded by: Julius Panka
- Succeeded by: Sakalas Gorodeckis

Personal details
- Born: 6 March 1951 (age 75) Vilnius, Lithuanian SSR, Soviet Union
- Party: Social Democratic Party of Lithuania (1991–2011); Lithuanian Nationalist Union (2011–present)
- Education: Vilnius University
- Profession: Economist

Audrius Rudys (born 6 March 1951 in Vilnius) is a Lithuanian economist and politician. In 1990 he was among those who signed the Act of the Re-Establishment of the State of Lithuania.
