= Vytautas Petras Plečkaitis =

Lithuanian politician

Vytautas Petras Plečkaitis (born October 16, 1950) is a Lithuanian politician. In 1990 he was among those who signed the Act of the Re-Establishment of the State of Lithuania.
