= Julius Beinortas =

Lithuanian politician (1943–2019)

Julius Beinortas (11 February 1943 – 13 February 2019) was a Lithuanian politician. In 1990 he was among those who signed the Act of the Re-Establishment of the State of Lithuania.
