= Supreme Council – Reconstituent Seimas =

Lithuanian legislature (1990–1992)

Supreme Council of the Republic of Lithuania Lietuvos Respublikos Aukščiausioji Taryba
- Lithuania
- Provisional coat of arms of Lithuania (1990–1992)

Type
- Type: Unicameral

History
- Established: 1990
- Disbanded: 1992 (new constitution adopted)
- Preceded by: Supreme Soviet of the Lithuanian SSR
- Succeeded by: Seimas

Elections
- Last election: 1990

Meeting place
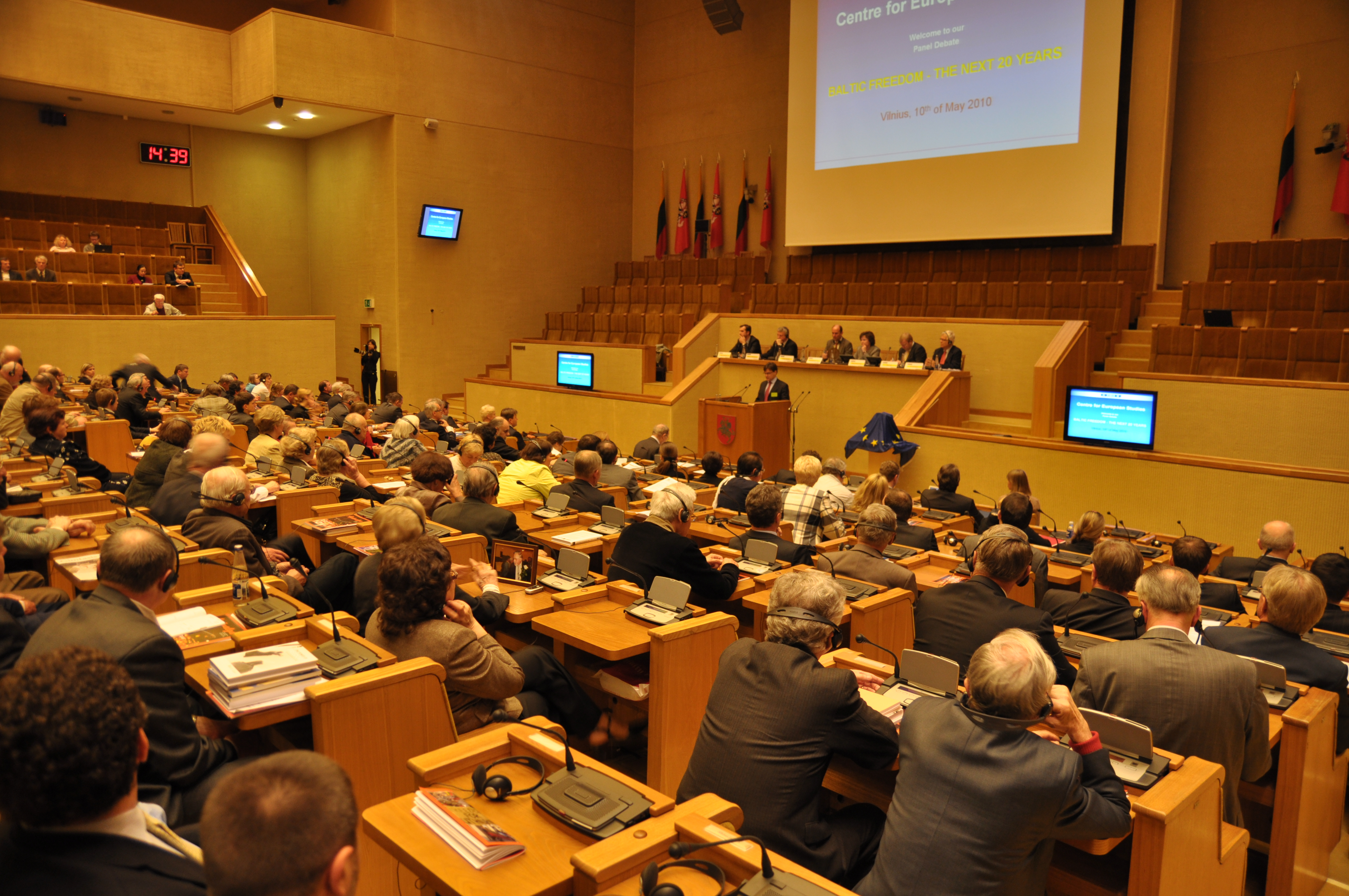
- Seimas Palace, Vilnius

The Supreme Council – Restoration Seimas of the Republic of Lithuania (officially known as Supreme Council of the Republic of Lithuania), was the supreme governing body, elected in 1990. Its first meeting was held on 10 March 1990, and its last on 11 November 1992.

== Powers ==
As outlined in the Provisional Basic Law of the Republic of Lithuania (1990), the Supreme Council had the following powers:

- to adopt the Constitution of the Republic of Lithuania and amend it
- to call for elections for deputies throughout the Republic of Lithuania and to confirm the composition of the Electoral Commission of the Republic
- to approve drafts of the basic programmes of economic and social development of the Republic of Lithuania; approval of budget
- to regulate property relations of in the Republic
- to interpret the laws of the Republic of Lithuania
- to form state bodies accountable to the Supreme Council of the Republic of Lithuania; to establish the systems of the procuracy, the Courts and other judicial bodies of the Republic of Lithuania
- to elect chairman and vice-chairmen, and Secretary of the Supreme Council
- to elect the Supreme Court of Lithuania and judges of regional and city courts, to appoint the Procurator-General of the Republic of Lithuania;
- to hold regular hearings, to receive reports by institutions established and elected by the Supreme Council, with the exception of the Supreme Court of Lithuania
- when necessary, to issue nonconfidence votes by secret ballot regarding the Executive Branch of the Republic of Lithuania and other institutions formed by the Supreme Council or regarding any of their members, with the exception of the Supreme Court of Lithuania
- to establish appropriate measures to guarantee state security and public order
- to reapportion the administrative-territorial structure of the Republic of Lithuania
- to change the names and status of administrative-territorial units
- to consider matters relating to the foreign policy of the Republic of Lithuania; to ratify and renounce international treaties of the Republic
- to establish state awards of the Republic of Lithuania
- to adopt a decision to hold referendum
- to issue acts of amnesty
- to repeal directives and decrees of the Executive Branch, as well as decisions of regional councils and municipal councils of the Republic if they conflict with existing legislation
- to resolve other significant issues of state

== Political activity ==
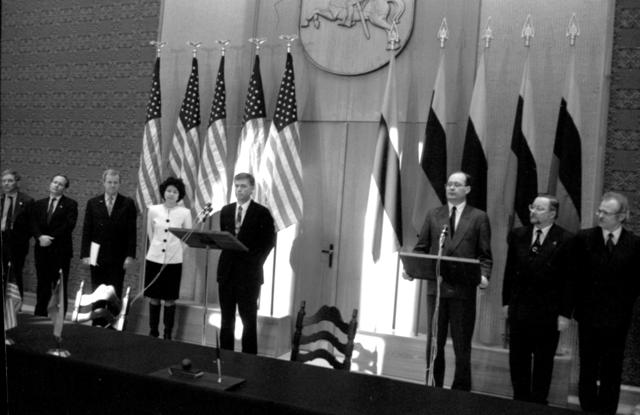
U.S. Vice President Dan Quayle’s visit to the Supreme Council of Lithuania, February, 1992

From the outset, the work of the Supreme Council on 11 March 1990, Lithuania adopted the Act of the Re-Establishment of the State of Lithuania. On 12 March, the Supreme Council adopted the Resolution, that declared USSR universal military service law of 12 October 1967 invalid within the Republic of Lithuania. The council also nationalized all assets of the USSR located within Lithuania. However just three days later, on 15 March, the Soviet Congress of People's Deputies adopted a resolution, in which restoration of the independence of the Republic of Lithuania was declared null and void. Congress passed this resolution with 1,463 people's deputies voted for, 98 voted against and 128 abstentions.

Economic blockade had suspended the country's economic growth and the foreign states would not recognize the independence of Lithuania. But on 6 September 1991, after the failed 1991 Soviet coup d'état attempt, the Soviet federal government officially recognised the independence of Lithuania and other Baltic states, and lifted the blockade.

In the first half of 1992, parliament's majority changed. Until the end of 1991, the United Sąjūdis parliamentary group held majority. Its members by late 1991 and early 1992 gradually switched to other parliamentary groups (e. g. Seventh/Moderates' parliamentary group). This led to the infighting between United Sąjūdis parliamentary group (along with Vagnorius-led government) and so-called the 'New Majority' (Lithuanian: naujoji dauguma).

It caused gridlock in the parliament as both groups held their sessions separately or the United Sąjūdis parliamentary group boycotted official ones. On July 9, 1992, Supreme Council voted for the snap elections, which took place on October 25, 1992.

== Composition ==
=== Chairman ===
Name	Period
Vytautas Landsbergis	March 11, 1990–November 25, 1992

=== Deputy Chairmen ===
Name	Period
Bronislovas Juozas Kuzmickas	March 11, 1990–November 25,1992
Kazimieras Motieka	March 11–November 25, 1992
Česlovas Vytautas Stankevičius	March 11, 1990–November 25, 1992
