= Juozas Dringelis =

Lithuanian politician (1935–2015)

Juozas Dringelis (25 June 1935 – 4 June 2015) was a Lithuanian politician, born in Pabaronė. In 1990 he was among those who signed the Act of the Re-Establishment of the State of Lithuania.
