= Ignacas Stasys Uždavinys =

Lithuanian politician (1935–2023)

Member of the Seimas
- In office 25 November 1992 – 18 October 2000

Personal details
- Born: 30 June 1935 Kaunas, Lithuania
- Died: 2 August 2023 (aged 88)
- Party: Sąjūdis; LKDP
- Education: Vilnius University
- Occupation: Mathematician

Ignacas Stasys Uždavinys (30 June 1935 – 2 August 2023) was a Lithuanian mathematician and politician. A member of the Lithuanian Christian Democratic Party, he served in the Seimas from 1992 to 2000.

Uždavinys died on 2 August 2023, at the age of 88.
