= Stasys Malkevičius =

Lithuanian politician (born 1928)

Stasys Malkevičius (born 17 March 1928) is a Lithuanian politician. In 1990 he was among those who signed the Act of the Re-Establishment of the State of Lithuania.

== See also ==
- Politics of Lithuania
