= Egidijus Bičkauskas =

Lithuanian politician (born 1955)

Egidijus Bičkauskas (born 29 May 1955) is a Lithuanian politician. In 1990 he was among those who signed the Act of the Re-Establishment of the State of Lithuania.
