= Romualda Hofertienė =

Lithuanian politician

Romualda Hofertienė (25 October 1941 in Girkalnis – 9 June 2017) was a Lithuanian politician. In 1990 she was among those who signed the Act of the Re-Establishment of the State of Lithuania.
