= Vladimir Jarmolenko =

Lithuanian politician

Vladimir Jarmolenko (born 15 May 1948) is a Lithuanian politician, born in Astrakhan, Russian SFSR. In 1990 he was among those who signed the Act of the Re-Establishment of the State of Lithuania.

Seimas
New constituency	Member of the Seimas for Dainava; 1990-2000	Succeeded by Kęstutis Glaveckas
