= Sigita Burbienė =

Lithuanian politician

Member of the Seimas
- In office 1992–2004

Personal details
- Born: May 17, 1954 (age 72) Vilnius, Lithuania
- Party: Social Democratic Party
- Education: Vilnius University

Sigita Burbienė (born May 17, 1954, in Vilnius) is a Lithuanian politician. She was elected to the Seimas three times.
