= Laurynas Stankevičius =

Lithuanian economist and politician

Minister of Health of Lithuania
- In office 1998–1999
- President: Valdas Adamkus
- Prime Minister: Gediminas Vagnorius
- Preceded by: Juozas Galdikas
- Succeeded by: Raimundas Alekna

Member of the Seimas
- In office 25 November 1996 – 31 March 1998
- Succeeded by: Juozas Bernatonis

7th Prime Minister of Lithuania
- In office 15 February 1996 – 27 November 1996
- President: Algirdas Brazauskas
- Preceded by: Adolfas Šleževičius
- Succeeded by: Gediminas Vagnorius

Minister of Social Security and Labour of Lithuania
- In office 21 September 1993 – 12 July 1994
- President: Algirdas Brazauskas
- Prime Minister: Adolfas Šleževičius
- Preceded by: Teodoras Medaiskis
- Succeeded by: Mindaugas Mikaila

First Deputy Minister of Social Security and Labour of the Lithuanian Soviet Socialist Republic
- In office 1988–1990
- Minister: Vaclovas Morkūnas

Personal details
- Born: 10 August 1935 Aukštadvaris, Lithuania
- Died: 17 March 2017 (aged 81) Vilnius, Lithuania
- Resting place: Antakalnis Cemetery, Vilnius
- Party: Democratic Labour Party (after 1990)
- Other political affiliations: Communist Party of Lithuania (before 1990)
- Spouse: Irena Stankevičienė
- Children: 1
- Education: Leningrad Institute of Finance and Economics
- Awards: Order for Merits to Lithuania

Laurynas Mindaugas Stankevičius (10 August 1935 – 17 March 2017) was a Lithuanian economist and politician who served as the 7th Prime Minister of Lithuania from February to November 1996. He previously served as the Minister of Social Security and Labour from 1993 to 1994, and after being prime minister, was a member of the Seimas from 1996 to 1998, and later Minister of Health from 1998 to 1999. Formerly a member of the Communist Party of Lithuania, following independence he joined the newly formed Democratic Labour Party.

== Early life and education ==
Stankevičius was born in Aukštadvaris, Trakai District, on 10 August 1935, five years before Lithuania was occupied by the Soviet Union and became the Lithuanian Soviet Socialist Republic. He attended high school at the Antanas Vienuolis Secondary School in Vilnius, graduating in 1953. From 1953 to 1957, he attended the Leningrad Institute of Finance and Economics (now Saint Petersburg State University of Economics and Finance).

== Career ==
=== Soviet era ===
After graduation, he worked as an economist of the Lithuanian SSR Ministry of Finance, and was then governor of the Agricultural Finance Administration. From 1969, he was the permanent representative of the Council of Ministers of the Lithuanian SSR to the Council of Ministers of the Soviet Union, and beginning in 1977, he was the Vice Chairman of the State Labour Committee. From 1988 to 1990, he was the First Deputy Minister of Social Security and Labour, until the Lithuanian SSR declared independence in March 1990 as the Republic of Lithuania.

=== Post-independence ===
Following independence, Stankevičius, who had been a member of the Communist Party of Lithuania, joined its successor party, the Democratic Labour Party. From September 1993 to July 1994, he served as Minister of Social Security and Labour under Prime Minister Adolfas Šleževičius. From 1994 to 1996, he was Minister of Administration Reforms and Self-government Affairs. On 15 February 1996, he was appointed prime minister by President Algirdas Brazauskas, a position he held until 27 November 1996, a little more than nine months total.

After leaving the office of prime minister, Stankevičius was elected to the Seimas, the Lithuanian parliament, where he served until 1998. While in the Seimas, he served on the Committee on Social Affairs and Labour. From 1998 to 1999, he served as Minister of Health under President Valdas Adamkus and Prime Minister Gediminas Vagnorius. In 1999, he retired from politics, residing in Vilnius.

== Personal life ==
Stankevičius was married to Irena Stankevičienė (Lithuanian), a former Supreme Court of Lithuania judge. They had one daughter, Rūta (born 1970).

He spoke Polish and Russian in addition to his native Lithuanian.

== Death ==
Stankevičius died of natural causes on 17 March 2017 at the age of 81. His body was laid out in Vilnius on 20 March, and the funeral took place at Antakalnis Cemetery the next day.

== Awards and honors ==
- Grand Commander of Order for Merits to Lithuania (2006)

Government offices
Preceded by Adolfas Šleževičius	Prime Minister of Lithuania; 15 February 1996 – 27 November 1996	Succeeded by Gediminas Vagnorius
