= Christian Democratic Union (Lithuania) =

Defunct Lithuanian political party

The Christian Democratic Union (Lithuanian: Krikščionių demokratų sajunga, KDS) was a political party in Lithuania.

== History ==
The party was established as the Lithuanian Christian Democratic Union (LKDS). It contested the 1992 elections in an alliance with Young Lithuania, with the alliance winning a single seat, taken by the LKDS. The party won only a single seat in the 1996 elections; it changed its name to "Christian Democratic Union" in the same year. The 2000 elections saw the party retain its single seat, increasing its vote share from 3% to 4%.

In 2001, it merged with the Lithuanian Christian Democratic Party to form the Lithuanian Christian Democrats.
