= Juozas Bernatonis =

Lithuanian jurist and politician

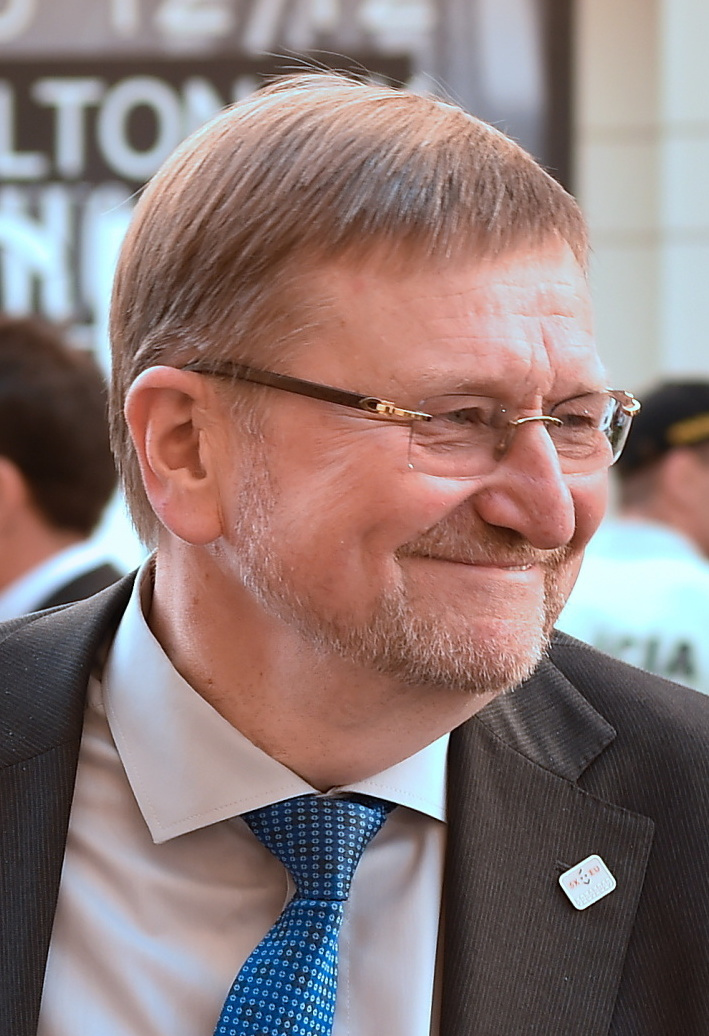

Minister of Justice
- In office 13 December 2012 – 13 December 2016
- Prime Minister: Algirdas Butkevičius
- Preceded by: Remigijus Šimašius
- Succeeded by: Milda Vainiutė

Minister of the Interior
- In office 2001–2003
- Prime Minister: Algirdas Brazauskas
- Preceded by: Vytautas Markevičius
- Succeeded by: Virgilijus Vladislovas Bulovas

Personal details
- Born: 8 September 1953 (age 72) Kaunas, Lithuanian SSR, Soviet Union
- Party: Social Democratic Party (1990-2017); Independent (2017-present)

Juozas Bernatonis (born 8 September 1953 in Kaunas) is a Lithuanian jurist and politician, Minister of Justice and member of the Seimas (1992–2004). He was a Lithuanian ambassador.
