= Lithuanian Union of Political Prisoners and Deportees =

Former Lithuanian political party

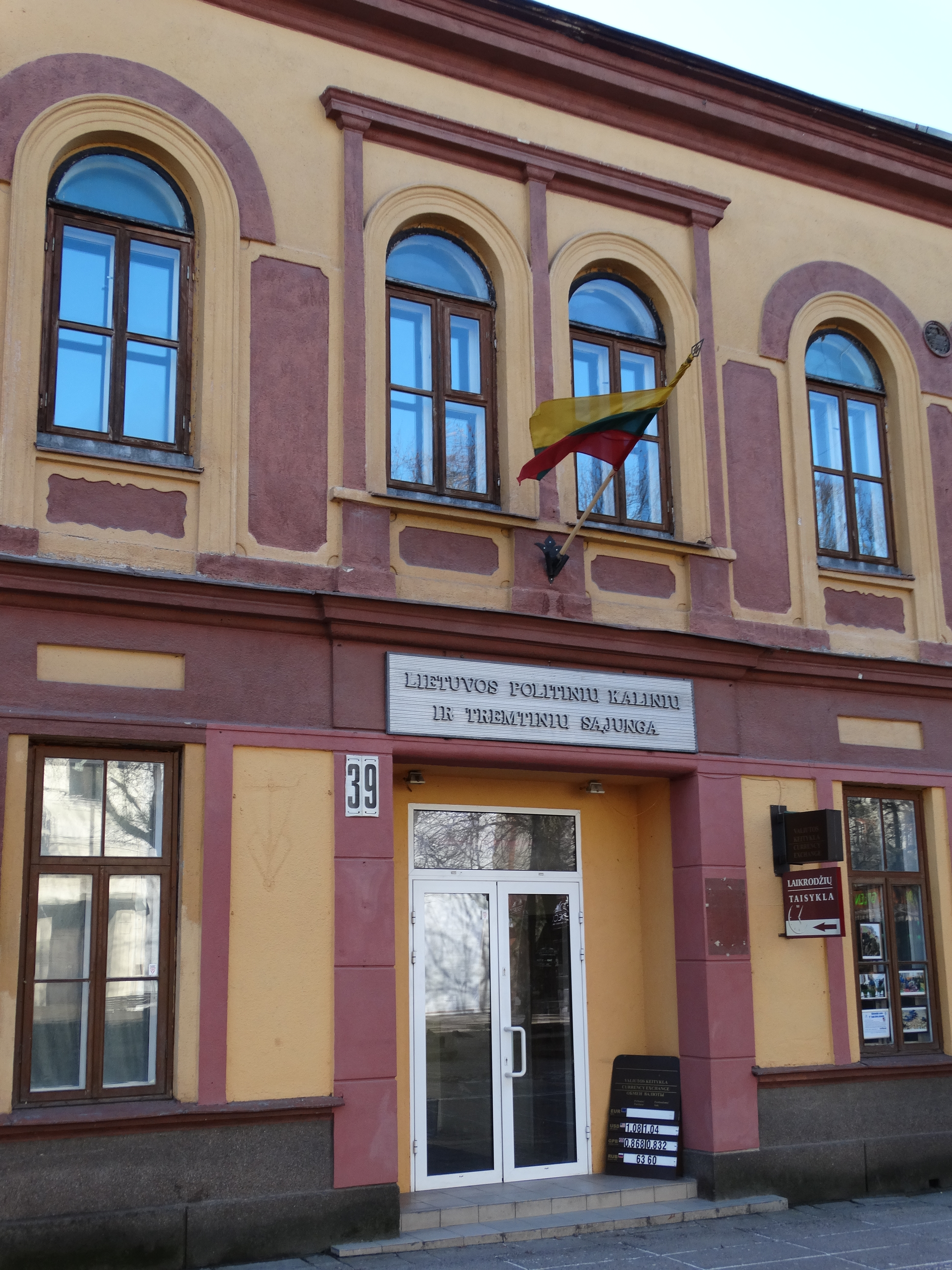
LPKTS office in Kaunas, 2017

The Lithuanian Union of Political Prisoners and Deportees (Lithuanian: Lietuvos politinių kalinių ir tremtinių sąjunga, LPKTS) was a political party in Lithuania between 1990 and 2004. It represented interest of those repressed by the Soviet regime, particularly political prisoners and deportees to Siberia, as well as of the activist struggling for Lithuanian independence.

== History ==
The organization was established on 30 July 1988 as the Club of the Exiled (Tremtinio klubas) of Sąjūdis in Kaunas, later becoming a political party. Audrius Butkevičius was an establisher and chairman of the "Tremtinio klubas".

In the 1992 elections, the ran on a joint list with the Lithuanian Christian Democratic Party and the Lithuanian Democratic Party. The joint list won 18 seats, with the LPKTS taking two. It ran alone in the 1996 elections, winning a single seat.

The party ran in alliance with the Homeland Union in the 2000 elections, with 19 of its candidates on the Homeland list. In 2004, it merged into the Homeland Union. However, it was not dissolved into the Homeland Union and remains its structural unit (the Political Prisoners and Deportees faction).

== Leaders ==
- Balys Gajauskas, the first chairman
- Povilas Jakučionis, 1997–1999; moved to the Homeland Union in 1999
- Antanas Lukša
- Gvidas Rutkauskas, 2014-2019
- Arvydas Anušauskas, since 2019
