= Lithuanian Democratic Party =

Established on 17 October 1902

The Lithuanian Democratic Party (Lithuanian: Lietuvių demokratų partija, LDP) was a political party in Lithuania. The original party was established in 1902. It published newspapers Lietuvos ūkininkas (1905–1918) and Lietuvos žinios (1909–1915). During World War I, the party split into several other parties and was disbanded in 1920. A new party under the same name was established in 1989.

== History ==
=== Original party ===
The party was established on 17 October 1902 at count Zubov's manor in Dabikinė near Akmenė by activists publishing Varpas. In 1906, it adopted a political program prepared by Kazys Grinius, Jonas Vileišis, Povilas Višinskis, Juozas Bortkevičius and Jurgis Šaulys. The goals of the party were to seek autonomy status for ethnic Lithuania within the Russian Empire. The local governance would be delegated to parochial committees, which could collect taxes. The program supported education and cooperation, promoted participation in public life, and advocated national unity. The party supported wealthier farmers, therefore during the Great Seimas of Vilnius of 1905 it opposed land reform that would have confiscated land from large landlords and distributed it to small peasants. After the Seimas, LDP sponsored the formation of the Peasant Union, which initially was a branch of LDP. Some members of LDP founded the Lithuanian National Democratic Party (Lithuanian: Tautiškoji lietuvių demokratų partija), headed by Jonas Basanavičius.

A new program by Albinas Rimka was adopted in 1914 and the party was renamed into the Democratic Party of Lithuania (Lithuanian: Lietuvos demokratų partija). Some members, including Petras Leonas and Andrius Bulota, of the party were elected into the State Duma of the Russian Empire.

During World War I, many activists evacuated into Russia. In 1917, the right wing faction formed the Lithuanian Socialist Popular Democratic Party (Lithuanian: Lietuvos socialistų liaudininkų demokratų partija); another faction formed the Lithuanian Socialist Popular Party (Lithuanian: Lietuvos socialistų liaudininkų partija). The LDP, which remained in Lithuania, was in essence inactive but still officially in existence. Two of its members, Jurgis Šaulys and Petras Vileišis, were elected to the Council of Lithuania, which adopted the Act of Independence of Lithuania in February 1918. The council ceased to exist in May 1920 when it was replaced by the Constituent Assembly of Lithuania. The LDP was formally dissolved on 15 May 1920.

=== New party ===
A new Lithuanian Democratic Party was established on 4 February 1989, chaired by Saulius Pečeliūnas. The party won three seats in the 1990 Supreme Soviet elections. It formed an alliance with the Lithuanian Christian Democratic Party and the Lithuanian Union of Political Prisoners and Deportees to contest the 1992 elections, with the alliance winning a total of 18 seats.

The LDP contested the 1996 elections in an alliance with the Lithuanian Nationalist Union. The alliance won a total of six seats, with the LDP taking two. The 2000 elections saw the LDP run as part of the Union of "Young Lithuania", New Nationalists and Political Prisoners. However, it failed to win a seat.
