= Lithuanian Nationalist and Republican Union =

Lithuanian Nationalist and Republican Union Lietuvių tautininkų ir respublikonų sąjunga
- Leader: Sakalas Gorodeckis
- Founded: February 1990; 35 years ago
- Dissolved: 2021; 4 years ago
- Merged into: People and Justice Union
- Headquarters: Vilnius
- Membership: 1,453 (August 2012); 3,291 (March 2020)
- Ideology: National conservatism Euroscepticism
- Political position: Right-wing to far-right
- Colours: Blue, gold

Website
- tautininkai.com

The Lithuanian Nationalist and Republican Union (Lithuanian: Lietuvių tautininkų ir respublikonų sąjunga or LTS), also known as the Nationalists (Tautininkai), was a right-wing nationalist political party in Lithuania. It claimed to be the continuation of the Lithuanian Nationalist Union, the ruling party in 1926–1940. The party was re-established when Lithuania declared independence in 1990 and performed increasingly poorly in the elections. In 2008, it merged with the Homeland Union, but demerged in 2011. In 2017, it merged with the Republican Party. The party promotes traditional family values, advocates for Lithuania's independence from the European Union, opposes immigration.

== History ==
The party was re-established in March 1989 and officially registered in February 1990. It played a diminishing role in Lithuanian politics. In the 1992 Seimas elections, the Lithuanian National Union won four seats. In 1996, it has three seats. Since 2000, it has no representatives. The number of representatives in the regional municipalities has also diminished: the party won 49 mandates in 1995, 23 in 1997, 13 in 2000, 14 in 2002, and three in 2007.

In 1997, the National Democratic Party of Lithuania under the leadership of Rimantas Smetona separated from the Nationalist Union and registered as a new political party in 1999.

On 11 March 2008, the Lithuanian Nationalist Union merged into the Homeland Union which formed the coalition government after the 2008 elections. Two members of the party, Kazimieras Uoka and Gintaras Songaila, were elected to Seimas of 2008–2012 as the members of the Homeland Union. Due to disagreements, the Homeland Union suspended Uoka's and Songaila's membership leading to the demerger. The party declared its political resurrection in a General Assembly on 17 December 2011.

On 23 August 2013, the Nationalist Union signed the Declaration of Bauska together with Conservative People's Party of Estonia and All for Latvia!. The declaration calls for a new national awakening of the Baltic states and warns about threats posed by Cultural Marxism, international globalism, multiculturalism and Russian imperial ambitions.

In November 2013, the Seimas amended the law on political parties requiring a minimum of 2,000 members (up from 1,000) with a grace period of two years to increase the membership. The Nationalist Union grew its membership from 1,649 in 2014 to 2,025 in 2015. In June 2017, the Nationalist Union merged with the Republican Party and was renamed to the Lithuanian Nationalist and Republican Union. The combined party membership is about 3,300 members (as of March 2020).

The party won one seat in the 2015 municipal elections and 5 seats in the 2019 municipal elections.

== Chairmen ==
The party's chairmen were:

- Rimantas Matulis (1989–1990)
- Rimantas Smetona (1990–1997)
- Vaidotas Antanaitis (1997–1998)
- Alvydas Baležentis (acting chairman, 1998–1999)
- Rapolas Gediminas Sakalnikas (1999–2003)
- Klemas Inta (2003–2005)
- Gintaras Songaila (2005–2008 and 2011–2013)
- Julius Panka (2013–2015)
- Audrius Rudys (2015–2017)
- Sakalas Gorodeckis (since 2017)

== Seimas election results ==
Election year	# of overall votes	% of overall vote	# of overall seats won	+/–	Government
1992	36,916	1.99 (#8)	4 / 141	▲	
1996	28,744	2.20 (#11)	1 / 141	▼	
2000	12,884	0.88 (#17)	0 / 141	▼	
2004	2,482	0.2 (#15)	0 / 141	Steady	
2012	12,854	0.98 (#13)	0 / 141	Steady	Alliance with LCP, National Unity Union and LSDS
2016	6,867	0.56 (#13)	0 / 141	Steady	Alliance with Young Lithuania
2020	26,767	2.36 (#8)	0 / 141	Steady	Alliance with Lithuanian Centre Party

== See also ==
- List of political parties in Lithuania
