= Democratic Labour Party of Lithuania =

Democratic Labour Party of Lithuania Lietuvos demokratinė darbo partija
- Abbreviation: LDDP
- President: Česlovas Juršėnas (2001)
- Founder: Algirdas Brazauskas
- Founded: 19 December 1989
- Dissolved: 1 May 2001
- Preceded by: Communist Party of Lithuania
- Merged into: Social Democratic Party of Lithuania
- Youth wing: Lithuanian Labourist Youth Union
- Ideology: Social democracy
- Political position: Centre-left
- Colors: (official); Pink (customary)
- Seimas (2000): 26 / 141
- Municipal councils (2000): 172 / 1,562

LLJU symbol

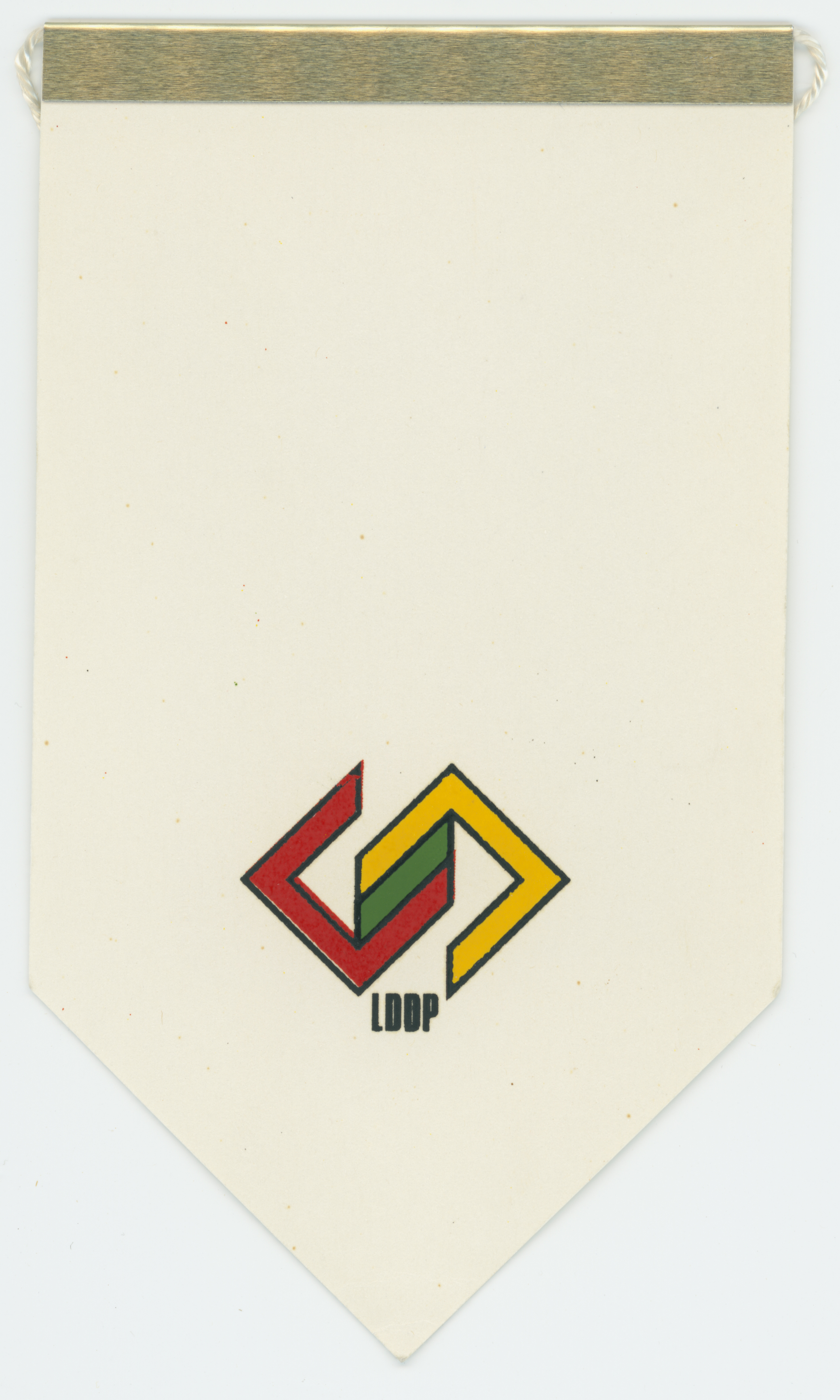
Pennant of the Lithuanian Democratic Labour Party

The Democratic Labour Party of Lithuania (Lithuanian: Lietuvos demokratinė darbo partija, LDDP) was a political party in Lithuania. It was the successor of the Soviet-era Communist Party of Lithuania. The youth organization of LDDP was called Lithuanian Labourist Youth Union (Lietuvos leiboristų jaunimo unija).

== History ==
The party traced its roots to December 1989, when the majority of the Communist Party of Lithuania broke away from the Communist Party of the Soviet Union. CPL (independent) (as it became known after formation of (CPL (CPSU)) took part in the 1990 Lithuanian Supreme Soviet election, in which the party came in second place. Amid this position, CPL (independent) joined the national unity government, which included almost all parties and organisations in the Supreme Council except the CPL (CPSU), Lithuanian Democratic Party (LDP) and the Association of Poles in Lithuania (ZPL). Algirdas Brazauskas became Deputy Prime Minister of Lithuania in the Prunskienė Cabinet.

By the autumn of 1990, there were several new names proposed for the party (etc. Lietuvos socialistų partija (Socialist Party of Lithuania), Lietuvos socialinės pažangos partija (Social Advancement Party of Lithuania), Lietuvos komunistų partija (Communist Party of Lithuania), Lietuvos demokratinė darbo partija (Democratic Labour Party of Lithuania)). In December 1990, the main body of the CPL reorganized as the DLPL.

By the late winter of 1992, the party overtook Sąjūdis as the most supported political party in Lithuania. The LDDP won the 1992 parliamentary election, gaining 43% of the vote giving it 73 seats in the Seimas. It is the best results for any political party in Lithuanian parliamentary election up to this date. LDDP was led by Algirdas Brazauskas. Because Brazauskas was elected as the first president in 1993, he was required to stop his activities in any parties. Adolfas Šleževičius became the party leader and the Prime Minister. After Šleževičius was charged with corruption in 1996, he was replaced by Česlovas Juršėnas.

In the 1996 parliamentary election, LDDP got about 9.5% of the votes and won 10 seats in the parliament. In next few years the party's support remained relatively steady. The party remained the main opposition party in Seimas, although its member and former Prime Minister Laurynas Mindaugas Stankevičius was Minister of Heath in the Vagnorius Cabinet between 1998 and 1999. Prior to the 2000 parliamentary election, the LDDP formed a coalition with the Social Democratic Party of Lithuania, the New Democracy Party and the Union of the Russians of Lithuania. The electoral coalition was named after Algirdas Brazauskas and it won a majority of the votes. In this coalition, parties formed a joint list in the nationwide constituency, but in single-member constituencies the coalition stood only one candidate per constituency to avoid vote splitting. In the elections the LDDP won 26 seats (the largest number of seats among the coalition's parties and third largest number of seats in the parliament).

In 2001, LDDP merged with the Social Democratic Party of Lithuania. The merged party took the Social Democratic name, but was dominated by former LDDP members. LDDP's name and logo were registered as a trademark, what prevented establishment of party with the same name and logo. Attempts of reviving the LDDP, like the "Democratic Labour and Unity Party" (DDVP) of Brazauskas' widow Kristina Brazauskienė or the Social Democratic Labour Party of Lithuania (LSDDP) only had limited success.

== Popular support ==
In the first half of 1990s, LDDP had around twenty per cent support nationally. This support was not uniform – mainly the party had the largest support in large cities with large factories and Russian speaking communities (e. g. Klaipėda). The only exception of large cities was Kaunas, where Sąjūdis (and later the Homeland Union) had greater support. In rural areas, the party's support came from districts with developed industry (e. g. Kelmė district).

As Lithuania became a service economy in the late 1990s, the party's support declined to around 10%. The other loss of voters came from parties representing Russian speakers (e. g. Union of the Russians of Lithuania). Also, the LDDP lost support to the New Union (Social Liberals).

== Electoral results ==
=== Supreme Council – Reconstituent Seimas ===
Election	Votes	%	Seats	+/–	Government
1990			46 / 141	▲46	Majority

=== Seimas ===
Election	Votes (Note: Proportional representation votes)	%	Seats	+/–	Government
1992	817,331	43.9 (#1)	73 / 141	▲27	Majority
1996	130,837	10.0 (#3)	12 / 141	▼61	Opposition (1996–1998)
1996	130,837	10.0 (#3)	12 / 141	▼61	Coalition (1998–1999)
1996	130,837	10.0 (#3)	12 / 141	▼61	Opposition (1999–2000)
2000	457,294 (Note: Participated in Social-Democratic Coalition of Algirdas Brazauskas (along with Social Democratic Party of Lithuania, Union of the Russians of Lithuania and New Democracy Party))	31.1 (#1)	26 / 141	▲14	Opposition (2000–2001)

== List of presidents ==
#	Image	President	Term
1		Algirdas Brazauskas	1990 – 1993
2		Adolfas Šleževičius	1993 – 1996
3		Česlovas Juršėnas	1996 – 2001
