= 1992 Lithuanian parliamentary election =

- 25 October 1992 (first round); 15 November 1992 (second round)
- All 141 seats in the Seimas; 71 seats needed for a majority
- Turnout: 75.24%
| Party | Leader | Vote % | Seats | +/– |
|---|---|---|---|---|
| LDDP | Algirdas Brazauskas | 43.98 | 73 | +27 |
| Sąjūdis | Vytautas Landsbergis | 21.17 | 30 | −61 |
| LKDP–LPKTS–LDP | Povilas Katilius | 12.61 | 18 | +13 |
| LSDP | Aloyzas Sakalas | 6.05 | 8 | −1 |
| LKDS–LTJS | Kazys Bobelis | 3.55 | 1 | New |
| LCS | Romualdas Ozolas | 2.52 | 2 | New |
| ZPL | Jan Sienkiewicz | 2.14 | 4 | New |
| LTS–NP | Rimantas Smetona | 1.99 | 4 | New |
| Independents | – | – | 1 | −5 |
This lists parties that won seats. See the complete results below.
| Prime Minister before | Prime Minister after |
|---|---|
| Aleksandras Abišala; Independent (endorsed by Sąjūdis) | Bronislovas Lubys; Independent (endorsed by LDDP) |

Parliamentary elections were held in Lithuania in two stages on 25 October and 15 November 1992. A total of 141 members were elected to the Seimas, which replaced the Supreme Council; 70 were elected using proportional representation and 71 from single-member constituencies. Where no candidate in the single-member constituencies received more than 50% of the vote on 25 October, a run-off was held on 15 November. The first round of the elections were held simultaneously with a referendum on the adoption of a new constitution.

The result was a victory for the Democratic Labour Party of Lithuania (LDDP), which won 73 seats. Analysts attributed the surprisingly decisive victory to support from farmers and the Russian and Polish minorities, as well as widespread dissatisfaction with the economic situation and the policies of the ruling Sąjūdis political movement, which only won 30 seats. LDDP leader Algirdas Brazauskas was subsequently elected the Speaker of the Sixth Seimas and assumed the title of acting President. Bronislovas Lubys was appointed Prime Minister.

The elections were the first in Europe following the fall of the Iron Curtain in which a former communist party received the most votes and returned to government. They were also the only ones to date in which a single party won an absolute majority in the Seimas. The LDDP received the highest vote share of any party in free and fair elections in Lithuania since 1920.

== Electoral system ==
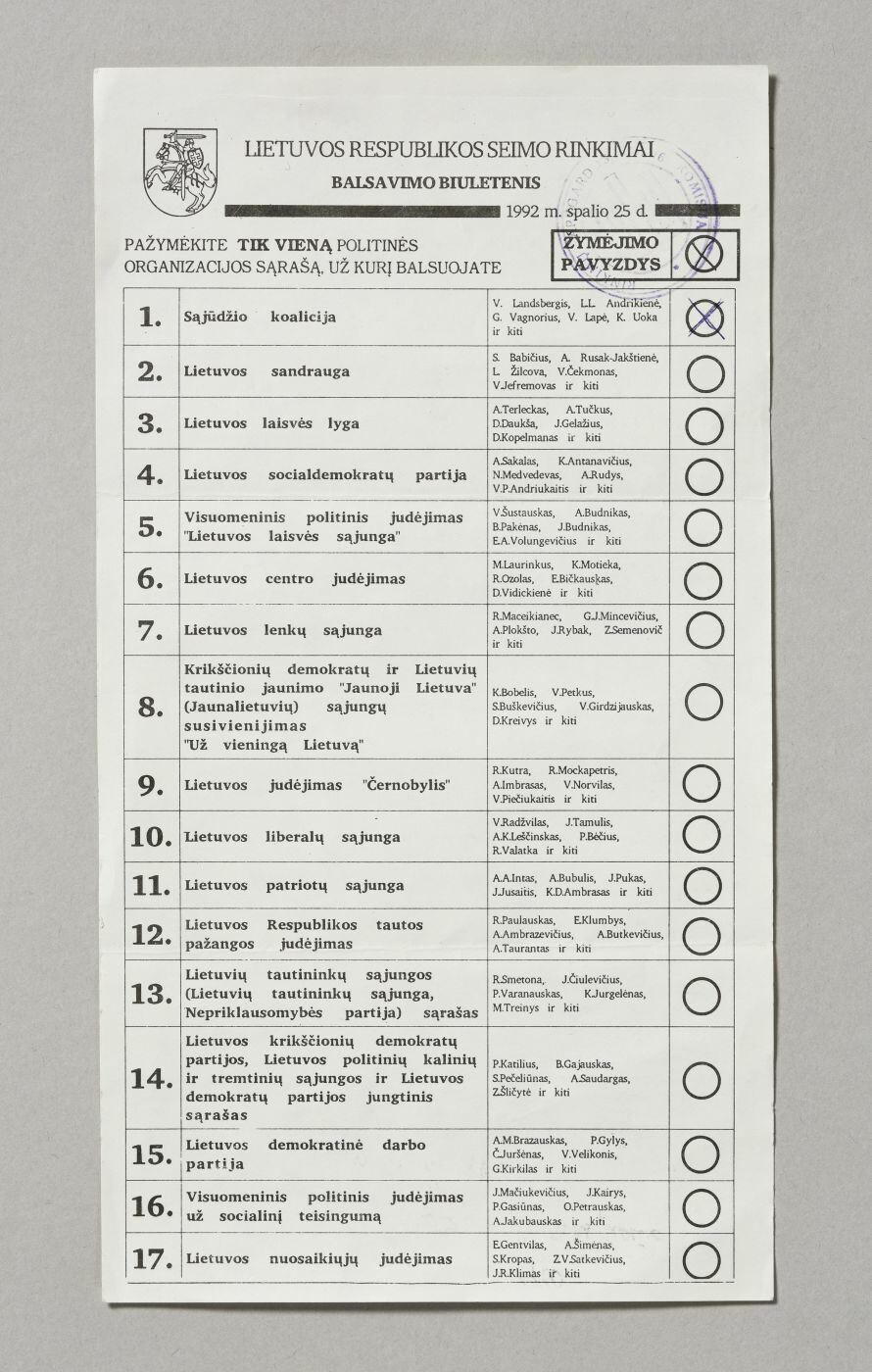
Ballot paper

The elections were held under the terms of the new electoral law, which had been adopted on 9 July 1992; on the same day, the election date was set for 25 October. The law provided for a mixed electoral system, with 70 MPs elected by closed list proportional representation in a single nationwide constituency with a 4% electoral threshold, and 71 MPs in single member constituencies using the two-round system. The 4% threshold in the nationwide constituency did not apply to electoral lists representing national minorities, for whom it was reduced to 1.4%. Allocation of seats in single nationwide constituency was conducted using the Hagenbach-Bischoff quota.

The mixed electoral system was a compromise between the two main political powers, the Sąjūdis coalition, which preferred first-past-the-post, and the ex-communist LDDP, which had proposed proportional representation. The latter was confident of the appeal its political stance had with voters but lacked popular personalities, while Sąjūdis was concerned about its falling approval ratings but counted among its members many of the individuals that had led Lithuania to independence from the Soviet Union. The mixed system was also expected to strike a balance between MPs representing the interests of their constituencies and the interests of their parties.

Suffrage was granted based on citizenship of the former Soviet Union (with exceptions) as opposed to being based solely on the citizenship law of the pre-war Republic of Lithuania (similarly as happened in Latvia and Estonia in early 1990s).

The elections were the first in which voters abroad could vote by post. These voters' votes were assigned to the 1st (Naujamiestis) constituency, where the Seimas Palace was located.

== Campaign ==
The main challenger to the ruling Sąjūdis nationalist movement, led by outgoing Chairman of the Supreme Council of Lithuania Vytautas Landsbergis, was the LDDP headed by Brazauskas. Sąjūdis – which had controlled the Supreme Council since February 1990 and spearheaded the move to independence – was criticized for the country's economic woes, while their opponents called for a slowdown in the pace of change to a free-market system and improved relations with Russia. In the run-up to the elections, Sąjūdis portrayed the opposing political groups as communist and reactionary, opposed to independence and democracy. The LDDP proclaimed their political principles, including the foreign policy aims of membership of the Council of Europe, association agreement with the European Community, agreements with the International Monetary Fund and neighborly relations with Poland. They also called for agreements with Russia to secure traditional sources for materials and trade.

Altogether 26 parties and political movements contested the elections, with 486 candidates contesting the single-seat constituencies. Opinion polls suggested that no political group would win a decisive majority and a coalition government seemed likely. Most participating parties ruled out joining a coalition government with the LDDP.

== Opinion polls ==
=== Graphical summary ===
View source data.

| Polling Firm | Last date of polling | Sąjūdis | LDDP | LSDP | LKDP–LDP | LLS |
|---|---|---|---|---|---|---|
| INFAS/Bull (exit poll) | 25 October 1992 | 21.6 | 42.6 | 6.1 | 12.6 | – |
| INFAS/Bull (exit poll) | 25 October 1992 | 27 | 32 | 7 | 14.5 | 2.5 |
| RTV | 31 July 1992 | 50.1 | 27 | 14.1 | – | 5.7 |
| VNTC | 11 – 16 June 1992 | 21.8 | 41.2 | 5.1 | 12.1 | 4 |
| VNTC | 17 – 23 March 1992 | 21.9 | 43.9 | 4.2 | 11.6 | 3.4 |
| VNTC | 23 – 28 January 1992 | 30.5 | 29.6 | 4.2 | 12.3 | 3.6 |
| VNTC | 4 – 9 December 1991 | 33 | 23 | 6 | 15 | 2 |

== Results ==
Polling procedures were witnessed by international observers. The LDDP won 73 seats, with analysts attributing their victory to the party's support from farmers and the Russian and Polish minorities, as well as popular anger about the economic crisis, in particular the fuel shortages since Russia (the main supplier) had cut off imports. The results showed widespread desire for a different political direction and dissatisfaction with the confrontational approach to politics used by Sąjūdis. The elections were even more disappointing for centrist political groups, which only received around 15% of the vote, despite many prominent individuals in their ranks.

| Party or alliance | | Proportional | | | Constituency (first round) | | | Constituency (second round) | | | Total seats | +/– |
| Party or alliance | | Votes | % | Seats | Votes | % | Seats | Votes | % | Seats | Total seats | +/– |
|---|---|---|---|---|---|---|---|---|---|---|---|---|
| Democratic Labour Party of Lithuania | | 817,332 | 43.98 | 36 | 642,602 | 34.99 | 8 | 590,475 | 44.04 | 29 | 73 | +35 |
| Sąjūdis coalition | Sąjūdis | 393,502 | 21.17 | 8 | 262,762 | 14.31 | 1 | 259,052 | 19.32 | 10 | 19 | –39 |
| Sąjūdis coalition | Citizens' Charter of Lithuania | 393,502 | 21.17 | 7 | 67,316 | 3.67 | 0 | 74,108 | 5.53 | 2 | 9 | New |
| Sąjūdis coalition | Lithuanian Political Prisoners' Union | 393,502 | 21.17 | 2 | 13,397 | 0.73 | 0 | 9,926 | 0.74 | 0 | 2 | New |
| Sąjūdis coalition | Lithuanian Green Party | 393,502 | 21.17 | 0 | 6,651 | 0.36 | 0 | 9,329 | 0.70 | 0 | 0 | –5 |
| LKDP–LPKTS–LDP | Lithuanian Christian Democratic Party | 234,368 | 12.61 | 8 | 131,595 | 7.17 | 0 | 120,112 | 8.96 | 6 | 14 | +12 |
| LKDP–LPKTS–LDP | Union of Political Prisoners and Deportees | 234,368 | 12.61 | 2 | 61,145 | 3.33 | 0 | 37,454 | 2.79 | 2 | 4 | New |
| LKDP–LPKTS–LDP | Lithuanian Democratic Party | 234,368 | 12.61 | 0 | 27,766 | 1.51 | 0 | | | | 0 | −4 |
| Social Democratic Party of Lithuania | | 112,410 | 6.05 | 5 | 166,013 | 9.04 | 0 | 51,487 | 3.84 | 3 | 8 | –1 |
| For United Lithuania | Christian Democratic Union | 66,027 | 3.55 | 0 | 9,246 | 0.50 | 0 | | | | 0 | New |
| For United Lithuania | Lithuanian Nationalist Youth Union | 66,027 | 3.55 | 0 | 15,117 | 0.82 | 0 | 11,591 | 0.86 | 1 | 1 | New |
| Lithuanian Centre Movement | | 46,910 | 2.52 | 0 | 45,652 | 2.49 | 0 | 20,245 | 1.51 | 2 | 2 | New |
| Association of Poles in Lithuania | | 39,773 | 2.14 | 2 | 35,191 | 1.92 | 1 | 7,304 | 0.54 | 1 | 4 | +2 |
| LTS–NP | Nationalist and Republican Union | 36,916 | 1.99 | 0 | 80,808 | 4.40 | 0 | 67,821 | 5.06 | 3 | 3 | New |
| LTS–NP | Independence Party | 36,916 | 1.99 | 0 | 14,354 | 0.78 | 0 | 19,355 | 1.44 | 1 | 1 | New |
| Liberal Union of Lithuania | | 28,091 | 1.51 | 0 | 48,574 | 2.65 | 0 | | | | 0 | New |
| Lithuanian Liberty League | | 22,034 | 1.19 | 0 | 11,437 | 0.62 | 0 | | | | 0 | New |
| National Progress Movement | | 19,835 | 1.07 | 0 | 60,273 | 3.28 | 0 | 16,582 | 1.24 | 0 | 0 | New |
| Moderates Movement | | 13,002 | 0.70 | 0 | 41,223 | 2.24 | 0 | 9,816 | 0.73 | 0 | 0 | New |
| Socio-Political Movement for Social Justice | | 9,734 | 0.52 | 0 | 5,013 | 0.27 | 0 | | | | 0 | New |
| Lithuanian Liberty Union | | 7,760 | 0.42 | 0 | 5,752 | 0.31 | 0 | | | | 0 | New |
| Lithuanian Movement "Chernobyl" | | 4,827 | 0.26 | 0 | | | | | | | 0 | New |
| Lithuanian Commonwealth | | 4,161 | 0.22 | 0 | 7,996 | 0.44 | 0 | 5,770 | 0.43 | 0 | 0 | New |
| Union of Lithuania's Patriots | | 1,904 | 0.10 | 0 | 582 | 0.03 | 0 | | | | 0 | New |
| Independents | | | | | 75,953 | 4.14 | 0 | 30,432 | 2.27 | 1 | 1 | –5 |
| Total | | 1,858,586 | 100.00 | 70 | 1,836,418 | 100.00 | 10 | 1,340,859 | 100.00 | 61 | 141 | 0 |
| Valid votes | | 1,858,586 | 96.90 | | 1,836,418 | 95.72 | | 1,340,859 | 97.16 | | | |
| Invalid/blank votes | | 59,441 | 3.10 | | 82,201 | 4.28 | | 39,156 | 2.84 | | | |
| Total votes | | 1,918,027 | 100.00 | | 1,918,619 | 100.00 | | 1,380,015 | 100.00 | | | |
| Registered voters/turnout | | 2,549,952 | 75.22 | | 2,549,952 | 75.24 | | 2,183,490 | 63.20 | | | |
Source: VRK, Slavic Research Centre

== Aftermath ==
The decisive outcome of the elections surprised observers and even the LDDP, who had expected to win 15–17 seats and did not have enough names on their electoral list (on their nationwide list the party had put only 71 members). Sąjūdis reacted to their loss with disbelief and encouraged supporters to join acts of civil disobedience. The elections also caused dissent in Sąjūdis' membership and led to the formation of a formal political party, the Homeland Union, in 1993.

The first session of the newly elected Sixth Seimas took place on 25 November 1992, having originally been planned for 18 November, but recounts in some single-member constituencies and disputes over possible voting irregularities caused the session to be delayed.

In the first session of the Seimas, Brazauskas was elected Speaker and assumed the title of acting President. Brazauskas would go on to be elected President on 14 February 1993 in the country's first presidential elections. After Brazauskas was elected president (and due to Speaker Česlovas Juršėnas having to suspend his membership of the LDDP parliamentary group), the LDDP's parliamentary majority decreased to one. By April 1993 the LDDP tally had increased by three seats as the Supreme Court of Lithuania annulled Central Electoral Commission decisions that recognised victories in run-offs to candidates who had received fewer votes than the LDDP candidates. The party also won back Kaišiadorys constituency in a by-election.

On 1 December 1992 Bronislovas Lubys, an independent business manager and politician supported by the LDDP, was appointed Prime Minister.
