= Socialist People's Front =

Socialist People's Front Socialistinis liaudies frontas
- Leader: Giedrius Grabauskas
- Founded: 2009
- Registered: 23 February 2010
- Dissolved: 2016 (as party); 12 July 2023
- Merger of: Front Party; Socialist Party of Lithuania
- Headquarters: Kaštonų g. 4, Vilnius
- Membership (2014): 1,145
- Ideology: Marxism; Socialism; Democratic socialism Left-conservatism; Left-wing nationalism Left-wing populism
- Political position: Far-left
- European affiliation: INITIATIVE
- International affiliation: IMCWP
- Continental affiliation: CPSU (2001)
- Lithuanian parliament: 0 / 141
- European Parliament: 0 / 12
- Local councils: 0 / 1,526

Website
- slfrontas.lt

The Socialist People's Front (SPF; Lithuanian: Socialistinis liaudies frontas) was a left-wing political association and a former political party of Lithuania formed in December 19, 2009, from a merger of the Front Party and Socialist Party of Lithuania. Held at Vilnius University, the party's foundation featured 102 delegates. The merger was approved by an affirmative vote of 96 delegates, with three against and one abstaining. The leader of the Socialist Party of Lithuania, Giedrius Petružis, refused candidacy for chairperson of the merged party, claiming a desire to return to academic life. The leader of the Front Party, Algirdas Paleckis, was unanimously chosen as the leader of the SPF.

The party was registered with the Ministry of Justice on 23 February 2010. Since 2015 it was led by Edikas Jagelavičius. In December 2017, the party was reorganized into a political association, as it was liquidated in 2016 for lacking the minimum required number of members for a party.

In late 2018, some of the senior members and several supporters split from the party, thus forming the Socialist Party.

== Ideology and Political Programme ==
The ideology of the SPF is democratic socialism. The party's by-laws and programme were ratified at the party's founding conference on December 19, 2009. The party's by-laws indicate that the "Party is an inseparable part of the international leftist movement. It actively pursues the strengthening of bonds of friendship between Lithuania and other nations, fights for the continuation and strengthening of peace, and maintains contact with international nongovernmental organizations that adhere to the principles of democracy and socialism." The goals of the party include "the institution of democratic socialism in Lithuania and the strengthening of a unified public, whose members help each other." The by-laws also indicate that:

In its political action the party follows the guidelines set by a creatively developing Marxist theory and methodology, advances made by western social democracies, the positive beginnings of Soviet socialism, the achievements of the capitalist system beneficial to society, and the principles of humanitarianism, equal rights, and solidarity... The SPF represents physical and intellectual work done on behalf of the interests of the workers in the private, public, and governmental spheres. The SPF protects the rights of small and middle-sized businesses. Its persistent concern is the problems faced by recipients of welfare. The SPF will seek to achieve its goals only by peaceful, political means, respecting the Constitution of Lithuania, laws, and international acts and principles that defend human rights.

== Structure ==
The SPF congress is the supreme organ of the party. The congress chooses the party's executive council, which oversees and organizes the activity of the party in between congresses, received decisions regarding creating coalitions with other parties, and approves the budget, any reports on the use of funds, and the candidacy of the head of the election committee. The party's sole leader is the chairperson. Territorial subgroups of the party are its chapters and groups.

== Participation in elections ==
The party participated in the 2012 parliamentary election and came 11th with 16,515 (1.21%) votes and no seats. The municipal elections in 2015 were more successful, as the political bloc the party participated in received 68 seats, of which 2 were delegates of SPF, including Rafael Muksinov, a member of Vilnius City Council. The party council decided not to participate in the 2016 parliamentary election.

== Controversies ==
The SPF caused controversy twice in 2010 when members of the party were denied entry into Estonia. On April 21, party leader Algirdas Paleckis was part of a group of activists traveling to Estonia to protest NATO's policy regarding the war in Afghanistan. Paleckis was told that he was on the Estonian persona non-grata list because of his political views and activities. In late June, SPF activists, along with anti-fascists from Latvia, were denied entry on their way to protest a meeting of veterans of the 20th Waffen Grenadier Division of the SS near the Vaivara concentration camp. The activists were told that their vehicle was not fit for entry, and, according to the SPF, the only member of the SPF who managed the border crossing into Estonia was not on the official SPF list of activists and had not been mentioned by name by protest organizers over the telephone.

In 2011, Lithuanian authorities had initiated prosecution against Paleckis for his denial of Soviet aggression against Lithuania, or, to be more specific, against his claim that Soviet soldiers and special units were not responsible for the deaths of 13 people (including one victim of friendly fire) on January 13, 1991. Paleckis allegedly found several witnesses and ballistic assessments that seemed to indicate that there were secret snipers on the roof of the Vilnius TV centre who were shooting into the civilians. He then went on to state publicly that "it appears that in January 1991 our own people were shooting at our own people." It was the first verdict in Lithuania's history on charges of denying aggressive conduct of the Soviet Union. A Vilnius court had vindicated Paleckis in January 2012. The prosecution had appealed, and Paleckis was sentenced to a fine of 10,400 litas on June 12, 2012. Paleckis himself claimed that there was purportedly no independent investigation into the events of January 13, 1991 at the Vilnius TV tower.

The party also hails the Constitution of People's Seimas, adopted by the puppet government led by Justas Paleckis.

During the demonstration to commemorate Independence Day of Lithuania on February 15, 2014, the leader of Kaunas' branch Giedrius Grabauskas commented on the Act of March 11 as the one "having brought severe consequences to Lithuania".

During the events of EuroMaidan the party was one of very few in Lithuania who clearly expressed support for a then-president Viktor Yanukovych. On May 20, 2014 the party, together with other small radical organisations, organised a small rally in front of the Ministry of Foreign Affairs to voice its opposition towards Lithuanian foreign policy during the Russo-Ukrainian war, making accusations for "representing the interests of the US and EU, not Lithuanian ones".

A former leader Algirdas Paleckis left the party in January 2016, just before the Parliamentary election. He motivated such a decision by "diverted opinions with the party leadership", their "overestimation of the significance of rallies and underestimation of the one of participation in the election". As a result, Paleckis participated in the election as an independent candidate in Naujoji Vilnia. The party with a new leadership started to use more nationalist rhetoric.

== Political positions ==
Even though the party is economically far-left, with statements often attacking free market economics, it has voiced conservative views on social issues such as LGBT rights and immigration policy. One of its members Sergejus Sokolovas has declared that leftists should fight sexual minorities rather than support them. He also referred to the supporters of LGBT movement as tolerasts, a pun of tolerance and paederasty frequently used by the hate speech groups. Its former leader Algirdas Paleckis was among the initiators organising the 2014 referendum on banning sale of land to foreigners.

The party also opposes quotas for refugees and participated in an anti-refugee rally held in Šiauliai on November 14, 2015. Other than the European refugee crisis, which they referred to as a 'involuntary immigration', the rally also highlighted "human rights abuses of the working class", "war propaganda" and "Russophobia". The demonstration also saw the attendance of a syncretic sister organisation "The Combat", former neo-Nazi activist Žilvinas Razminas, as well as Way of Courage and right-wing populist Union of the Fighters for Lithuania.

== Leadership ==
- Algirdas Paleckis (2009-2015.06.04)
- Edikas Jagelavičius (2015-2017)
- Giedrius Grabauskas (2017-)
