= Socialist Party (Lithuania) =

Socialist Party Socialistų partija
- Leader: Collective leadership
- Founded: 2018
- Split from: Socialist People's Front
- Ideology: Marxism; Socialism; Democratic socialism
- Political position: Left-wing
- International affiliation: IMCWP
- Lithuanian parliament: 0 / 141
- European Parliament: 0 / 12
- Local councils: 0 / 1,526

Website
- socpartija.lt

The Socialist Party (SP; Lithuanian: Socialistų partija) is a minor left-wing Marxist political association in Lithuania formed on October 21, 2018, from a split of the Socialist People's Front.

The party traces its origins to the Socialist Party of Lithuania (LSP), founded in 1994 by former members of the banned Communist Party of Lithuania (LKP).

== History ==
The Socialist Party of Lithuania was founded in 1994 by a group of like-minded individuals who sought to continue their socio-political activities within a Marxist framework despite the banning of the Communist Party of Lithuania. The SP opposed Lithuania's membership in the European Union and NATO, advocating for neutrality and the implementation of socialism.

In 2008, the Front Party emerged, founded by former members of the Social Democratic Party of Lithuania (LSDP) under the leadership of former Vilnius vice-mayor and diplomat Algirdas Paleckis. The Front party's platform featured broadly leftist rhetoric with a patriotic focus, aiming for capitalist reforms rather than systemic change. It accepted Lithuania's membership in the EU and NATO, diverging significantly from the SPL's principles.

In 2009, the SPL and the Front Party merged to form the Socialist People's Front (SLF). This merger was largely driven by the SPL, with many former Front members leaving the newly formed party shortly after. Despite efforts to establish a unified socialist movement, internal contradictions persisted, leading to significant ideological clashes.

By 2015, the SPF faced further challenges with a new law requiring political parties to have 2000 members by 2016. Efforts to merge with other groups to meet this requirement led to ideological dilution. Paleckis' departure in 2016, along with several activists, marked another significant blow.

In 2016, internal conflicts reached a peak, resulting in a split within the SLF. A faction committed to maintaining Marxist principles, led by former leaders and new members with solid Marxist orientations, opposed the populist tendencies of the Jagelavičius-Grabauskas group. This culminated in the creation of two factions: one retaining the original SPF name and another adopting the name SLF(m) to emphasize its Marxist adherence.

On October 21, 2018, a conference of the SLF(m) was held in Vilnius. The participants unanimously approved the reorganization of the organization and established a public movement called the "Socialist Party". The participants of the conference approved the program of the Socialist Party titled "Three Steps to a Different Lithuania" and elected a collegial governing body for the new entity – the Board.

== Platform ==
The Socialist Party advocates for a shift towards a democratic socialist, neutral Lithuania. The party critiques pro-Western, military-oriented, and anti-social policies of the current government. The Socialist Party stands for the following:

- Implementing economic regulation and planning
- Nationalizing strategic assets
- Promoting trade union participation in economic management
- Progressive taxation
- Granting more rights to districts and municipalities
- Withdrawing from NATO, European Union
