= Union of the Fighters for Lithuania =

Union of the Fighters for Lithuania Kovotojų už Lietuvą sąjunga
- Leader: Stanislovas Tomas
- Founded: August 6, 2011
- Dissolved: June 21, 2022
- Split from: Lithuanian Liberty Union
- Headquarters: Kaunas
- Membership: 1,388 members (2012)
- Ideology: Eurofederalism; Russophilia; Communitarianism; Conservatism
- Political position: Far-right
- Seimas: 0 / 141
- European Parliament: 0 / 11
- Municipal councils and mayors: 0 / 1,558

The Union of the Fighters for Lithuania (Lithuanian: Kovotojų už Lietuvą sąjunga), previously known as the Union for the President of Lithuania (Lithuanian: Lietuvos Prezidento sąjunga) was a minor political party in Lithuania of an eclectic far-right political orientation which was founded in 2011. It replaced the Lithuanian Liberty Union. It did not achieve any notable electoral results and was liquidated by the Central Electoral Commission in 2022 for failing to provide a list of members.

== History ==
=== Foundation ===
The Lithuanian Liberty Union was reorganized to the Union for the President of Lithuania on 6 August 2011. Kristina Brazauskienė, the wife of the former President of Lithuania Algirdas Mykolas Brazauskas and former member of the Social Democratic Party, was elected as the new party's chairwoman. According to Brazauskienė, the party was intended to defend the interests of common people, and she demanded to abolish severance pay for Members of the Seimas.

However, she only remained chairwoman for a few months. After demanding the party to be renamed to the "Kristina Brazauskienė's Alliance for Unity" (Lithuanian: Kristinos Brazauskienės vienybės sąjunga) and being refused, as well as opposing the election of the former chairman of the Liberty Union, Vytautas Šustauskas, as the second chairman of the party, she resigned from the position, left the party and founded the Democratic Party of Labour and Unity.

=== Šustauskas' leadership ===
After Brazauskienė's resignation, Šustauskas was elected as the new chairman and the party was renamed to the Union of the Fighters for Lithuania. Šustauskas, a former Member of the Seimas and mayor of Kaunas, was a controversial personality known for numerous protest actions, such as the "March of the Poor" in Vilnius in 1997, and self-styled himself as "King of the Beggars".

Ahead of the 2012 parliamentary election, the party was joined by several radical and pro-Russian activists. Jurij Subotin, former member of the far-left Front Party, and neo-nazi activist Visvaldas Mažonas ran as the party's candidates in single-member constituencies during the election, as well as Šustauskas himself. Most of the party's candidates had a criminal record. The elections were unsuccessful for the party, and none of the candidates received a significant share of the vote. Šustauskas ran in the by-elections held after the death of Julius Veselka on 3 March 2013, but was defeated again.

Through its chairman, the party was involved in a case in the Constitutional Court in 2012. Šustauskas, who claimed that he refuses to open a bank account in any bank which is controlled by foreign capital, sued the Social Security Fund (SoDra) for refusing to pay his sickness benefit unless he opened a bank account. The court affirmed his position.

The party endorsed the "Yes" vote in the 2014 Lithuanian constitutional referendum, which would have prevented non-Lithuanian citizens from holding any land in the country, and called for the usage of "forbidden means" to protect Lithuanian soil from foreign ownership. It compared Lithuania's political situation to the Israeli–Palestinian conflict, as well as the Russian sale of Alaska.

Jurij Subotin attempted to run in the 2014 presidential election as an independent candidate. He distanced himself from the party. In 2016, during a protest in Vilnius against corruption and NATO membership organized by the party, Subotin physically attacked Šustauskas.

The party sold its offices in Liberty Boulevard, Kaunas for 100 thousand euros in 2018. It struggled with activity, and Šustauskas offered the position of chairman to Signatory of the Act of the Re-Establishment of the State of Lithuania and right-wing politician Zigmas Vaišvila in 2016.

=== Attempted reformation to the Conservative Party ===
In November 2018, media in Lithuania received an announcement from an alleged "Conservative Party of Lithuania" (Lithuanian: Lietuvos konservatorių partija), which was planned to be established as a classical conservative party. The party's founders and members were not revealed in the announcement. In January 2019, it was announced that attorney Stanislovas Tomas registered in Russia was elected chairman of the Conservative Party, which was a planned reorganization of the Union of the Fighters for Lithuania. It was claimed that he was not a lawyer, but actually he was registered as a lawyer in Russia.https://www.komentaras.lt/aktualu/advokatas-stanislovas-tomas-ne-apsisaukelis/56642/ It also shared the alleged electoral program of the "List of Attorney Stanislovas Tomas" public election committee, which intended to run in the 2019 European Parliament elections.

Stanislovas Tomas' attempt to rename the party and register a new party statute was not recognized by the Ministry of Justice in March 2019 due to the vagueness and lack of clarity of the statute.

=== Tomas' leadership ===
Stanislovas Tomas' leadership led to a growth in party activity. A former member of Order and Justice, he was known for falsely claiming to be an attorney and being banned from representing individuals in the European Court of Human Rights after serving as the lawyer of Rolandas Paksas in Paksas vs. Lithuania despite not being accredited. He also claimed to have earned several doctorates, know 15 languages, memorized the Quran and that he was a former member of the Socialist Party of France and Labour Party of the United Kingdom.

The party organized a public election committee, the "List of Attorney Stanislovas Tomas", to contest the 2019 European Parliament elections. During the election campaign, he requested 50 eur from each pensioner with the promise of using his powers in the European Parliament to equalize old age pensions in Lithuania with the European Union average, which was investigated as a potential case of fraud. Tomas alleged that it is "his profit, and he is able to use it however he likes - even on prostitutes". The committee did not collect the required number of signatures to register for the election.

During the campaign, on 8 April 2019, Tomas smashed the commemorative plaque dedicated to Nazi collaborator Jonas Noreika in Vilnius after a months-long national debate over its removal. He evaded arrest and a fine for destroying public property by fleeing to Austria.

In May 2020, he released a proclamation in which he called for a "constitutional revolution" and the lynching of all members of the "Seimas of pederasts". He named far-right blogger Kazimieras Juraitis as the next chairman of the party. However, no transfer of leadership legally took place.

=== Liquidation ===
Several politicians, including Šustauskas, pro-Russian former member of Klaipėda city council Vyacheslav Titov and convicted fraudster and anti-LGBT activist Antanas Kandrotas, attempted to run in constituencies in the 2020 parliamentary election. These attempts were unsuccessful due to an inability to collect the necessary signatures or an active criminal record.

The party failed to provide a list of members in 2021. After failing to do so a second time, it was liquidated on 21 June 2022.

== Political positions ==
The party largely lacked defined political positions, but generally positioned itself as a populist, anti-establishment far-right party.

The party endorsed the "Yes" vote in the 2014 Lithuanian constitutional referendum and called for the usage of "forbidden means" to protect Lithuanian soil from foreign ownership. It opposed Lithuania's membership in NATO.

In 2019, Stanislovas Tomas shared the alleged electoral program of the "List of Attorney Stanislovas Tomas" public election committee on his Facebook account, which intended to run in the 2019 European Parliament elections and which demanded the European Union to punish the President of Lithuania and the Seimas for human rights violations as well as immediately abolish the Lithuanian Armed Forces and all other national armed forces in the European Union, replacing them with a European army. The program was signed by the members of the list with blood.

In 2019, it described itself as "communal conservative".

In 2020, the party chairman released a proclamation in which he called for a "constitutional revolution" and the lynching of all members of the "Seimas of pederasts".

One of the party's attempted candidates in the 2020 parliamentary election, Antanas Kandrotas, also known as "Cellophane" (Lithuanian: "Celofanas"), was one of the leaders of the protests of the Lithuanian Family Movement and anti-vaccination protests.

== Electoral results ==
=== Municipal ===
Election	Votes (Note: Municipal council election votes.)	%	Council seats	Mayors	+/–
2015	1,525	0.10 (#19)	0 / 1,473	0 / 60	

=== 2012 parliamentary (constituencies only) ===
Constituency	Candidate	Votes	%	Result
Zarasai-Visaginas	Jurij Subotin	551	3.37 (#8)	Defeated
Kalniečiai	Vytautas Šustauskas	291	1.89 (#8)	Defeated
Šilainiai	Visvaldas Mažonas	261	1.31 (#14)	Defeated
Fabijoniškės	Tirkišas Amanovas	63	0.27 (#16)	Defeated

=== 2013 by-election ===
Constituency	Candidate	Votes	%	Result
Ukmergė	Vytautas Šustauskas	401	3.66 (#8)	Defeated
