= Paleckis =

Paleckis is the masculine form of a Lithuanian family name. Its feminine forms are: Paleckienė (married woman or widow) and Paleckytė (unmarried woman).

The surname may refer to:

- Algirdas Paleckis (born 1971), Lithuanian politician
- Justas Paleckis (1899–1980), Lithuanian journalist and communist politician
- Justas Vincas Paleckis (born 1942), Lithuanian journalist and politician
