= Adam Mickiewicz Monument =

Adam Mickiewicz Monument may refer to:

- Adam Mickiewicz Monument, Gorzów Wielkopolski
- Adam Mickiewicz Monument, Kraków
- Adam Mickiewicz Monument, Poznań
- Adam Mickiewicz Monument, Warsaw
- Adam Mickiewicz Monument, Lviv, Ukraine/Poland
- Adam Mickiewicz Monument, Vilnius, Lithuania
- Adam Mickiewicz Monument, Paris, France
- Adam Mickiewicz Monument, Ivano-Frankivsk/Stanislawow, Ukraine/Poland
- Adam Mickiewicz Monument, Minsk, Belarus
