= Socialist Party of Lithuania =

Socialist Party of Lithuania Lietuvos socialistų partija
- Leader: Giedrius Petružis (last)
- Founded: March 26, 1994
- Dissolved: 2009
- Split from: Democratic Labour Party of Lithuania
- Merged into: Socialist People's Front
- Ideology: Democratic socialism Marxism
- Political position: Far-left
- International affiliation: IMCWP
- Colours: Red, Gold

The Socialist Party of Lithuania (Lithuanian: Lietuvos socialistų partija) was a left-wing political party in Lithuania. It was founded on March 26, 1994, and briefly had a Member of the Seimas in 1996. It did not achieve any success in elections and merged with the Front Party in 2009 to form the Socialist People's Front.

== History ==
The party was founded on March 26, 1994, by former members of the Democratic Labour Party of Lithuania, among others, protesting a perceived rightward shift in Lithuanian politics. Albinas Visockas, a writer and unemployed former factory worker, was elected as its first chairman. Upon foundation, the opposition in the Seimas, led by the Homeland Union, demanded an investigation into the party's possible ties with the defunct Communist Party of Lithuania, but the party was successfully registered.

The party was joined by LDDP Member of the Seimas Mindaugas Stakvilevičius in 1996, giving the party its first and only parliament member. It received 0.73% of the vote in the 1996 parliamentary election and did not win any seats. Stakvilevičius was elected as the party's new chairman and remained until 2006.

Alongside the anti-establishment politician Julius Veselka, the party organized a conference with Efstratios Korakas, Member of the European Parliament from the Communist Party of Greece, in October of 2003. In the conference, the party agitated to release Mykolas Burokevičius, a communist political leader who established a pro-Moscow split of the Communist Party of Lithuania and collaborated with the Soviet Armed Forces during the January Events in 1991.

The party joined the Social Democratic list in the 2002 municipal elections and Stakvilevičius was elected to the municipal council of Šiauliai City Municipality.

It attempted to rename itself into the "Communist Party of Lithuania" and restore the Soviet era communist party in 2003 and 2004, but the proposal was refused by the party's conference.

Giedrius Petružis, former Social Democratic member of the Klaipėda City Municipality council, was elected as the party's chairman in 2006. In December of 2009, it chose to unify with Algirdas Paleckis's Front Party and established the Socialist People's Front.

A socialist anti-NATO political association with the same name was founded in 2018. It claims itself to be a split from the Socialist People's Front and a restoration of the pre-unification LSP.

== Platform and ideology ==
The Socialist Party described itself as "new socialist". It distanced itself from Stalinism and founded its ideology on 21st century socialism. It supported nationalization of strategic industries, free tuition and healthcare, expressed support for small business, endorsed agricultural cooperatives, and opposed Lithuania's membership in NATO and the European Union.

== Controversies ==
In 2000, the party's chairman Mindaugas Stakvilevičius was among a delegation of Lithuanian politicians invited to observe the 2000 Belarusian parliamentary election and expressed his support for the state's president Alexander Lukashenko.

It honored members of the former Communist Party, such as the "Four Communards", four members of the underground Communist Party who were executed by Antanas Smetona's dictatorship in December of 1926.

The party's last chairman Giedrius Petružis received attention for proposing the annexation of Kaliningrad Oblast and turning it into an autonomous region of Lithuania.

The party's first chairman Albinas Visockas was convicted of murder in 2013.

== Election results ==
=== Seimas ===
Election	Votes (Note: Proportional representation votes.)	%	Seats	+/–	Government
1996	9,985	0.73 (#20)	0 / 141	▼1	Opposition
