= Antanas Kandrotas =

Lithuanian anti-LGBT activist

Personal details
- Born: 28 December 1980 (age 45) Kaunas, Lithuania
- Party: Union of the Fighters for Lithuania; Party "We Are Lithuania" (2023-current)
- Education: Kaunas University of Technology

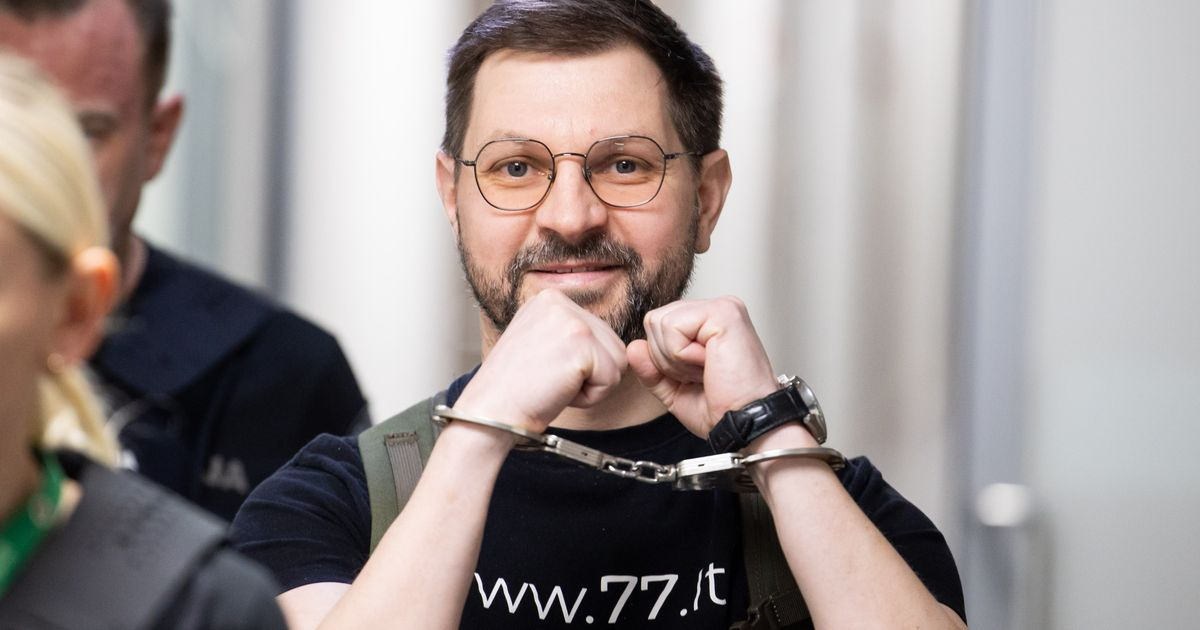
Antanas Kandrotas Celofanas

Antanas Kandrotas (born 28 December 1980), also known by the nickname Celofanas (English: Cellophane) and often written as Antanas Kandrotas-Celofanas, is a Lithuanian businessman, convicted fraudster, activist and politician. He was a planned candidate in the 2024 Lithuanian presidential election and chairman of the unregistered Party "We Are Lithuania" (Lithuanian: Partija "Mes Lietuva").

On 27 November 2023, he was convicted of financial fraud and sentenced to four years in prison. He was arrested and taken to prison on 15 January 2024.

== Early life ==
Kandrotas was born on 28 December 1980 in Kaunas to a father who was a businessman and a mother who worked as a nurse in Kaunas Clinics. He studied computer science in the Kaunas University of Technology.

In 2013, he was convicted of fraud by the Vilnius District Court. Alongside partners in crime, he created a dummy company in 2007 to purchase assets in debt and then disappear with the assets and returned VAT tax. He was sentenced to prison in Pravieniškės for one year and seven months. At the same time, in 2010, he was fined 753 EUR for negligent bookkeeping.

He was again sentenced to one year in prison for fraud in 2017 and for hiding 700 thousand EUR in taxes while purchasing and selling gasoline with a shell company in 2022. He was associated with the Agurkiniai criminal gang.

He is married twice, has one son, Antanas, from his first marriage and twin sons from his second one.

== Political career ==
Kandrotas gained notoriety protesting restrictions during the COVID-19 pandemic, including gluing sticky tape on his lips during his trials in protest against mask mandates. He attempted to stand as a candidate in the 2020 parliamentary election with the Union of the Fighters for Lithuania, a small far-right anti-establishment party. The party's attempt to stand for election was unsuccessful due to an inability to collect the necessary signatures and numerous candidates having an active criminal record.

He was one of the organizers of the "Great March in Defense of the Family" (Lithuanian: Didysis šeimos gynimo maršas), a demonstration of about 10 thousand people held in Vilnius on 15 May 2021, in protest against the Šimonytė Cabinet's civil partnership bill. Participating in the protest against COVID-19 pandemic restrictions on 10 August 2021, he was one of the instigators of a riot that led to a clash with police authorities, and was restricted from participation in further protests, but violated these restrictions.

In 2021, he was noticed driving a car carrying red license plates which were thought to have belonged to the embassy of Belarus in Lithuania. Kandrotas denied this and confirmed that they belonged to the Order of Malta, which he claimed to be a member of - however, the organization claimed that he was not a member and officially distanced themselves from the politician.

On 17–20 January 2022, Kandrotas visited Belarus along with other members of the anti-EU and anti-NATO movement "The Dawn of Justice" led by Algirdas Paleckis. During this visit, meetings and discussions were organized with the country's key figures, such as president Alexander Lukashenko and Minister of Foreign Affairs Vladimir Makei. Presenting themselves as a self described "Lithuanian civil society", the delegation expressed disdain for the Lithuanian government's policies regarding its eastern neighbors amidst the Belarus–European Union border crisis, grounding of Ryanair Flight 4978 and the 2020 Belarusian presidential election. They expressed an aspiration for fostering amicable relations and cooperation between the Lithuanian and Belarusian communities.

Released from prison in 2023, Kandrotas held numerous protests, including against pro-Ukrainian organizations, and committed vandalism.

On 16 August 2023, Kandrotas announced the establishment of Party "We Are Lithuania" (Lithuanian: Partija "Mes Lietuva") in a founding conference with a claimed membership of 2306 people. The party remains unregistered by the Electoral Commission. The party supports family values, LGBT rights opposition, Lithuanian nationalism and national sovereignty, and describes itself as conservative.

He was planning to run in the 2024 presidential elections, but the Supreme Electoral Commission of Lithuania did not register his candidacy due to failing to provide the required documents.

Antanas Kandrotas fled Lithuania in early May 2026 and travelled to Belarus, violating a court-imposed measure of written commitment not to leave the country. Without submitting any request to the authorities, he flew to Minsk — his second visit to Belarus that year — where he gave an interview to the state-controlled television channel “Belarus-4”, presenting himself as a political refugee escaping persecution in Lithuania. At the time of his departure, Lithuanian border control systems lacked the necessary data flags, allowing him to leave unimpeded. Kandrotas was already a convict serving a prison sentence in absentia and was involved in several ongoing criminal cases in Lithuania.
