= Lithuanian Liberty League =

The Lithuanian Liberty League or LLL (Lithuanian: Lietuvos laisvės lyga) was a dissident organization in the Lithuanian Soviet Socialist Republic and a political party in independent Republic of Lithuania. Established as an underground resistance group in 1978, LLL was headed by Antanas Terleckas. Pro-independence LLL published anti-Soviet literature and organized protest rallies. While it enjoyed limited popularity in 1987–1989, it grew increasingly irrelevant after the independence declaration in 1990. It registered as a political party in November 1995 and participated in parliamentary elections without gaining any seats in the Seimas.

== History ==
=== First political rallies ===
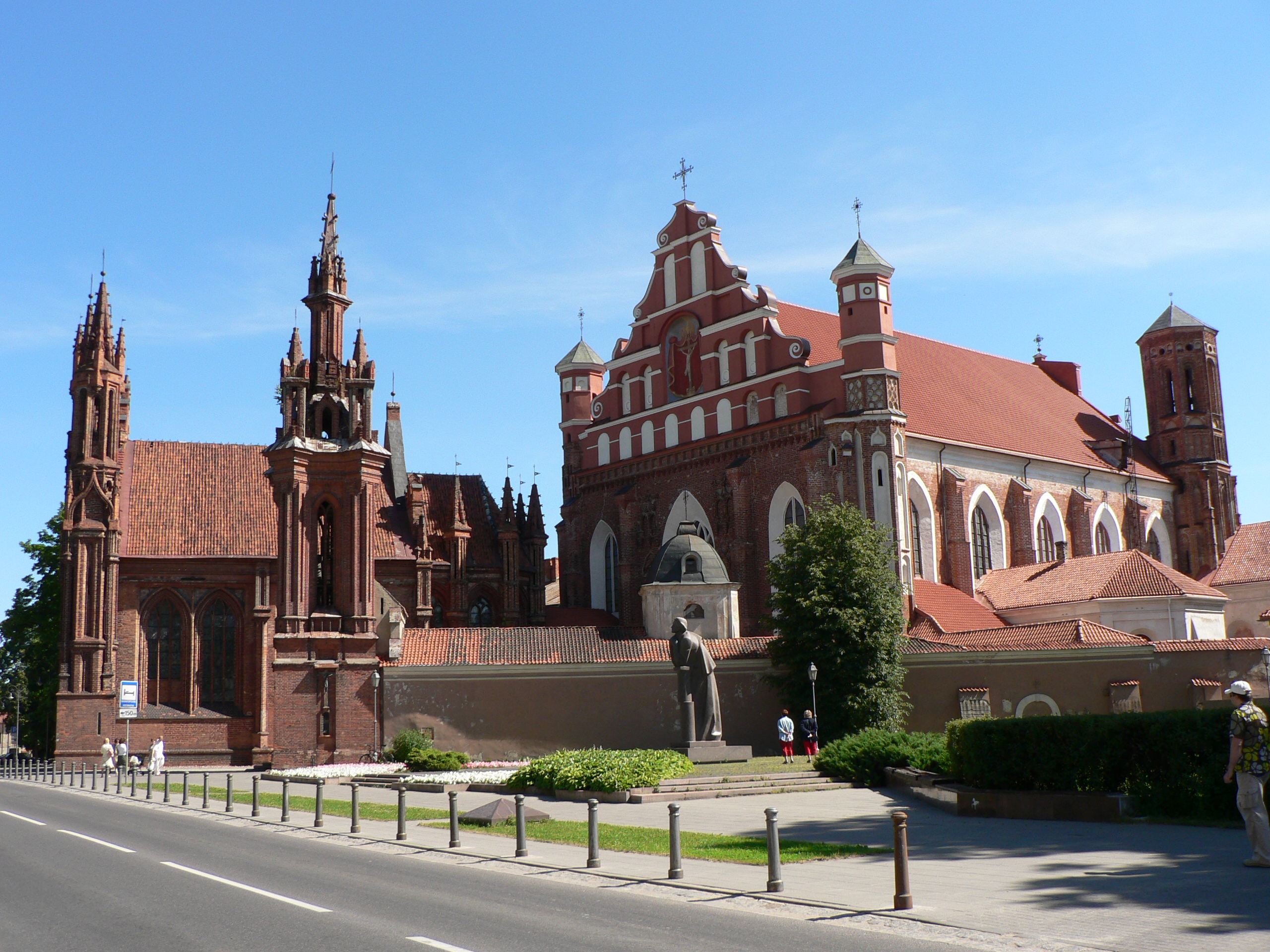
Square next to the St. Anne's Church, where the first protest took place on 23 August 1987

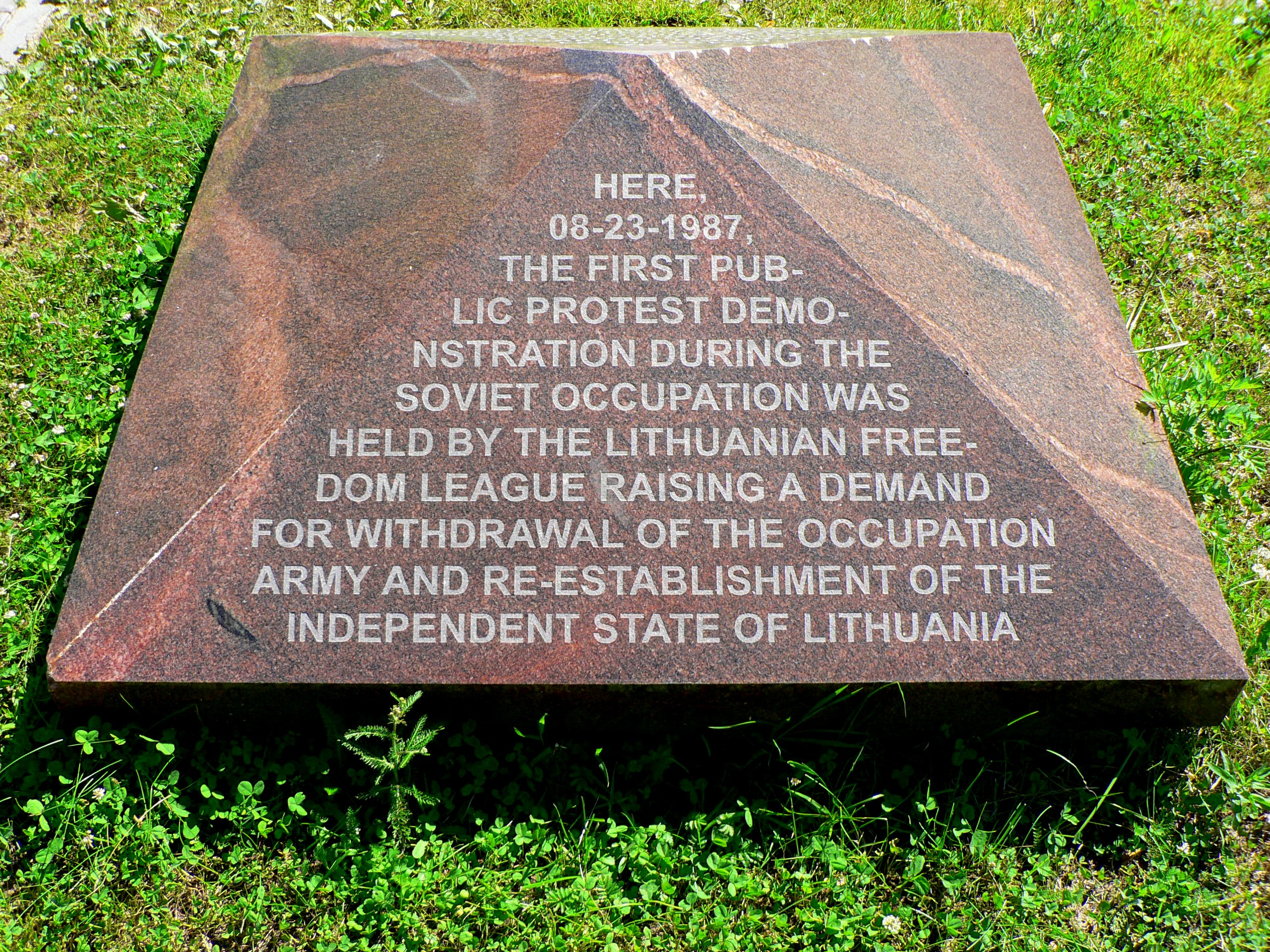
Monument dedicated to the protest of 23 August 1987

On 23 August 1987, the 48th anniversary of the Molotov–Ribbentrop Pact, LLL organized the first anti-Soviet rally that was not forcibly dispersed by the Soviet militsiya. The event tested the limits of glasnost and other liberal Soviet reforms and is often cited as one of the first signs of the Lithuanian independence movement. The rally took place near St. Anne's Church, Vilnius and attracted some 500 to 1,000 participants. While the militsiya monitored the event and reportedly KGB agents took pictures and video of the protesters, the speakers were not interrupted. Demands raised at the event included publication of the Pact, rehabilitation of those deported into Siberia, and greater rights to the Catholic Church. TASS, the official Soviet news agency, labeled the event as a "hate rally" and participants as "aggressive extremists." Other major rallies took place on 16 February 1988, the anniversary of the Act of Independence of Lithuania, and on other sensitive dates from the history of Lithuania.

=== Removal of Songaila and Mitkin ===
On 28 September 1988, the League organized an unsanctioned rally to commemorate the German–Soviet Treaty of Friendship, Cooperation and Demarcation in the Cathedral Square, Vilnius. Activists of more moderate reform movement Sąjūdis clearly distanced themselves from the event. The protesters were met by Soviet militsiya and Soviet Internal Troops from Vilnius and Minsk armed with batons and bulletproof vests. The peaceful protesters and passersby were attacked and brutally beaten with batons. Around 25 people were arrested. When the militsiya suddenly left the scene, the peaceful protest continued for another hour and a half. The event got the ironic name Bananų balius (literally: The Feast of Bananas).

In the early morning of 29 September, militiamen beat and arrested a group of dissidents on a hunger strike near Vilnius Cathedral. The group, under the leadership of Algimantas Andreika, protested the treatment of political prisoners. Outraged by such an unprovoked attack, LLL organized a follow-up rally the same day. Activists of Sąjūdis, including its leader Vytautas Landsbergis, not only participated in the rally but also openly questioned the Soviet authorities how such an incident fit into the official program of glasnost and perestroika. It was the first time that Sąjūdis actively supported and advocated on behalf of LLL. The arrested people were released the same day. In the following weeks, the activists called for the resignation of Ringaudas Songaila, the First Secretary of the Communist Party of Lithuania. Songaila was replaced by Algirdas Brazauskas on 19 October 1988. Main organizer and initiator of the forcible dispersion of the peaceful rally, Second Secretary of the Communist Party of Lithuania Nikolai Mitkin was removed as well in October 1988. It was the first time that a Kremlin man was removed by the local votes of the Communist Party of Lithuania.

=== Relations with Sąjūdis ===
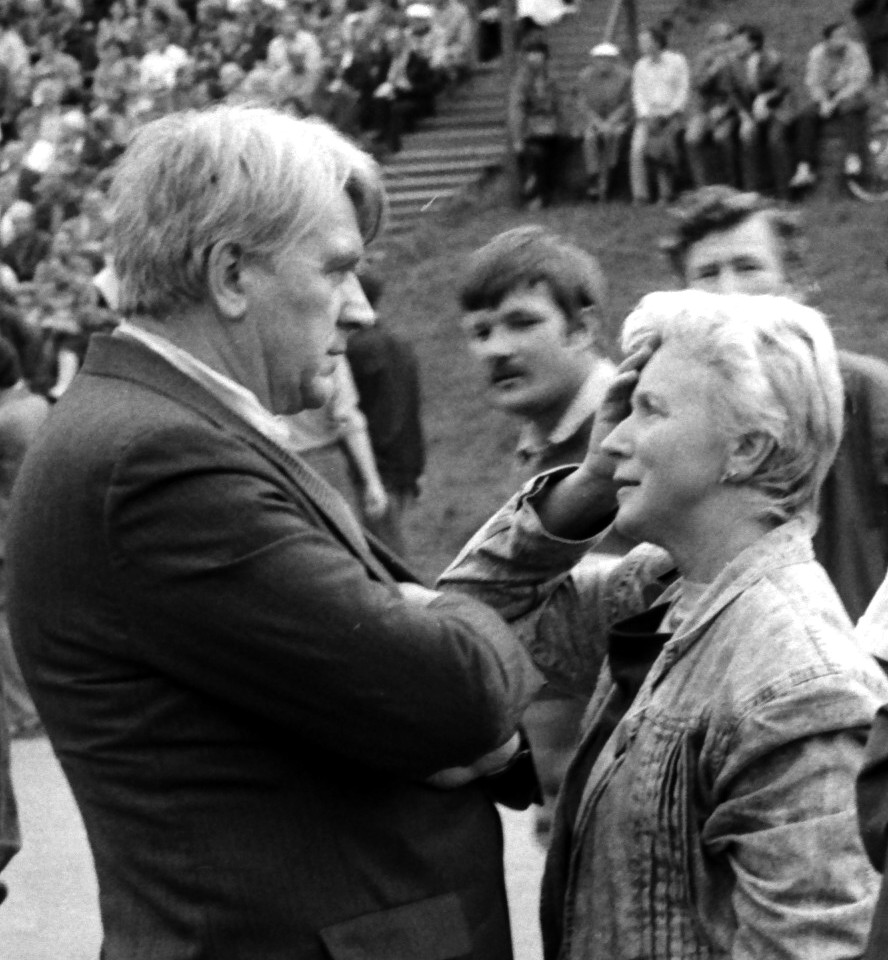
Terleckas, leader of LLL, with Laima Pangonytė at a rally in Kalnai Park in September 1989

Due to LLL's uncompromising agenda of full independence, the organization did not enjoy widespread support among the skeptic Lithuanian society. More prominent scientists, artists, and other activists joined the Sąjūdis reform movement, which had more moderate agenda and was established with permission from the Soviet authorities. The relationship between the two organizations was complex. While both organizations shared similar goals, LLL was more willing to confront and Sąjūdis preferred to compromise. Lithuanians abroad described Sąjūdis as "government approved" and LLL as "patriotic."

At first, Sąjūdis distanced itself from the dissident organization hoping not to tarnish its good reputation and respectable image. In the public opinion, dissidents were discredited, brought fear of arrest or other persecution, and were seen as people without a future. The presence of LLL saved Sąjūdis from the "extremist" label. However, after a violent suppression of the 28 September 1988 rally, both organizations grew closer together. When Sąjūdis opted for open membership, dissidents were free to join its ranks and in fact became its left wing. The League played an important role by marking all more sensitive dates from the history of Lithuania with protest rallies or declarations thus stirring up suppressed collective memory and revising official Soviet versions of the events. It also helped to radicalize the independence movement, hastening political reforms and the declaration of independence.

=== Participation in politics of Lithuania ===
LLL called to boycott the election to the Congress of People's Deputies of the Soviet Union in 1989 and the election to the Supreme Soviet of Lithuanian SSR in 1990. LLL for the first time took part in nationwide election only in 1992, when the movement obtained over 20,000 votes (or 1.19% of all votes). Prior these elections, the Lithuanian Liberty Union (LLS) was formed. Its chairman was Vytautas Šustauskas, who led LLL Kaunas branch since 1989.

In June 1994, Political Parties' and Political Organisations' Act was passed which allowed only political parties and coalitions to take part in the elections. Public organisations had to become political parties if they wanted to participate in the elections. LLL followed suit and registered as a political party in November 1995. Prior this decision, LLL joined various coalitions in 1994 and 1995 for the elections to the municipal councils. No LLL members were elected. Similar tactics were used in the 2000 Lithuanian parliamentary election. The party independently managed to win only four seats in the Panevėžys District Municipality in the 2000 Lithuanian municipal elections.

In 2002, LLL merged with the Independence Party, the Homeland People's Union, and the Lithuanian Democratic Party to form the Right Union of Lithuania. The Right Union itself merged with Homeland Union in 2003.

== Bibliography ==
- Laurinavičius, Česlovas; Sirutavičius, Vladas (2008). Sąjūdis: nuo "persitvarkymo" iki kovo 11-osios. Part I. Lietuvos istorija (in Lithuanian). Vol. XII. Baltos lankos, Lithuanian Institute of History. ISBN 978-9955-23-164-6.
- Senn, Alfred Erich (1995). Gorbachev's Failure in Lithuania. St. Martin's Press. ISBN 0-312-12457-0.
- Vardys, Vytas Stanley; Sedaitis, Judith B. (1997). Lithuania: The Rebel Nation. Westview Series on the Post-Soviet Republics. Westview Press. ISBN 0-8133-1839-4.
