= Teodor Rygier =

Polish sculptor (1841–1913)

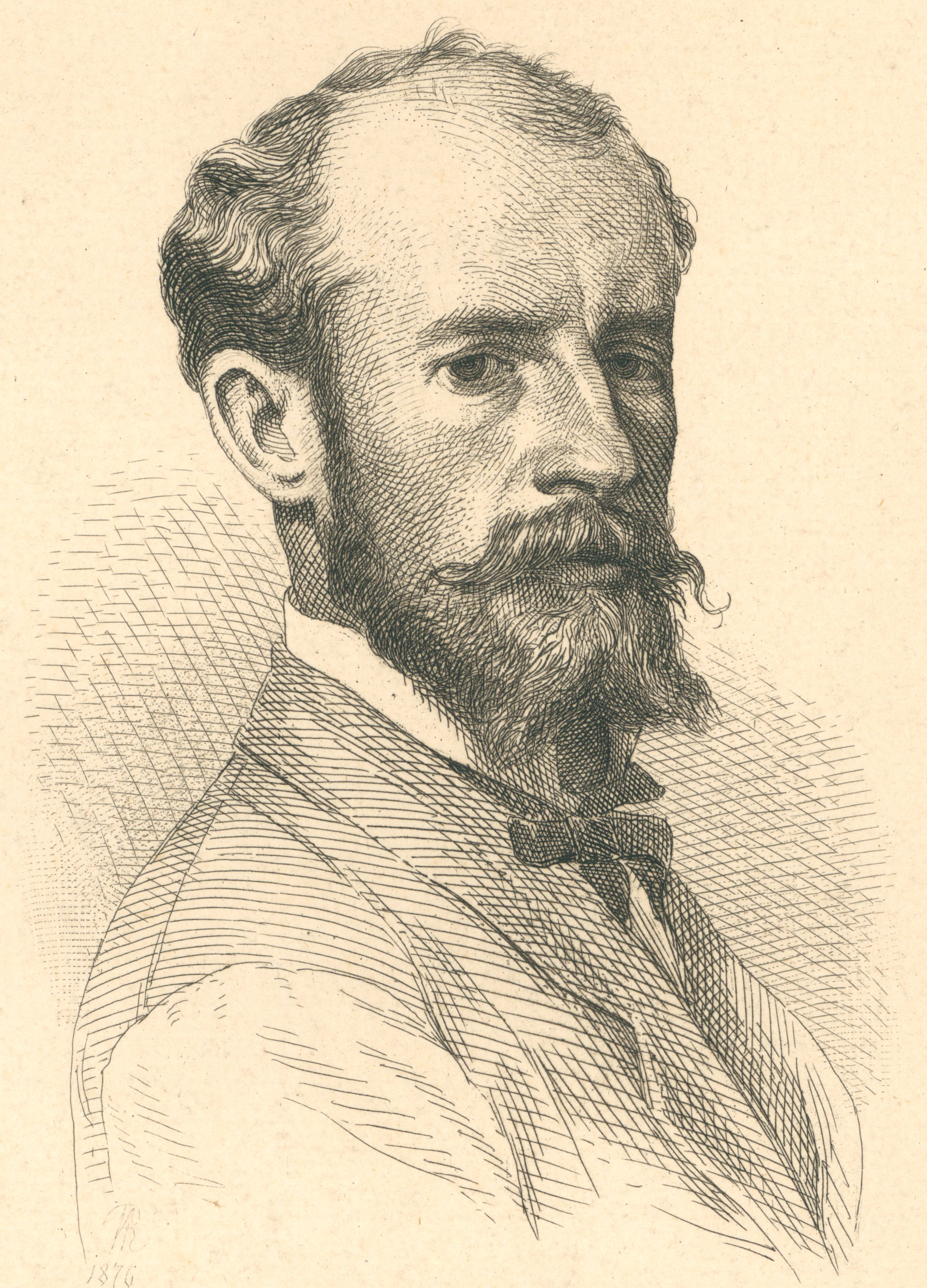
- Teodor Rygier, 1876
- Born: 9 October 1841; Warsaw, Kingdom of Poland
- Died: 18 December 1913 (aged 72); Rome, Kingdom of Italy
- Education: Academy of Fine Arts in Warsaw; Academy of Fine Arts, Munich
- Known for: sculpture
- Notable work: Adam Mickiewicz Monument in Kraków

Teodor Rygier (9 October 1841, Warsaw – 18 December 1913, Rome) was a Polish sculptor known especially for his Adam Mickiewicz Monument (1898) in Kraków, Poland. He was selected in the major competition by popular demand.

== Life ==
Rygier studied in several European cities: Warsaw, Dresden, Munich and Vienna. In 1865-1866 he studied sculpture in both Berlin and Paris. Subsequently, Rygier lived and worked in Florence between 1873 and 1886, and from 1886 in Rome. The Academy of Fine Arts of St Petersburg named him as an academic, while the Academies of Fine Arts of Florence and Bologna nominated him as an honorary associate.

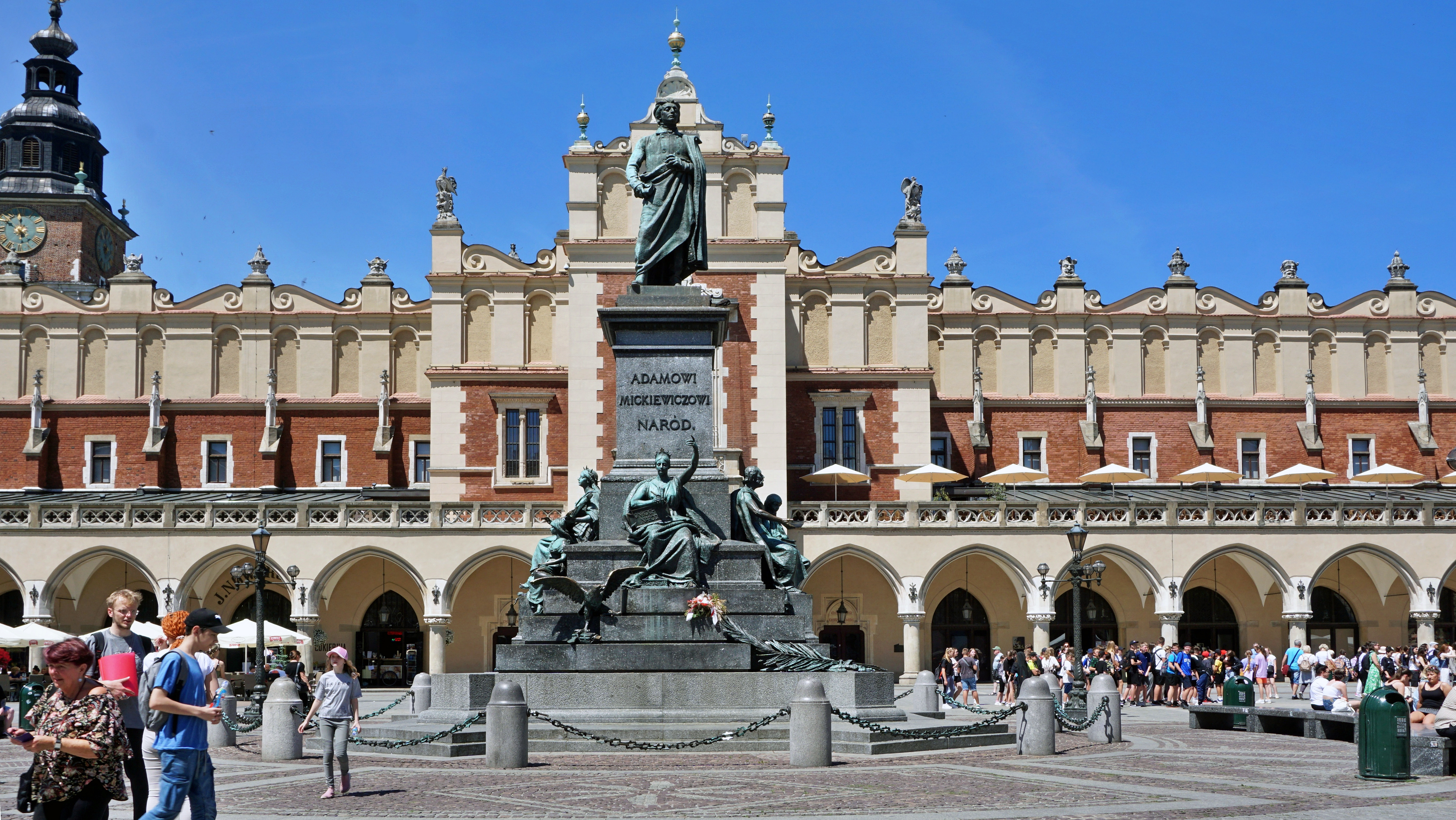
Adam Mickiewicz Monument by Teodor Rygier, Kraków

He won a stipend in Berlin that allowed him to study in Paris. There he displayed a life-sized statue of the Madonna at the Salon Exhibition in Paris of 1866. He returned to Poland to found a factory for the production of terra cotta statues, but the factory fell victim to a fire. During 1867–1874, he also found patronage in Poland for the production of medallions and busts. In Warsaw exhibitions, he won awards in 1872 and 1873 for statues of Faith and Copernicus. He completed several other works, including a statue of the Immaculate Conception, Coquette, busts of the Madonna, and a bust of a girl titled il Sorriso.

In 1874, Rygier settled in Florence. There he made a large bronze of the Risen Christ Blessing the World. In 1875, he made two stucco bas-reliefs: Christ before Pilate and Descent from the Cross. He intended to complete the 14 Stations of the Passion in bronze, but was stymied by the expense. In 1875, he sculpted a marble Madonna and child, exhibited at the Salon of Paris. In 1881, he completed the statue of Regina Caelorum, who extends her arms to the entire world. The portraits by this artists include the bust of Antonio Corazzi of Livorno. In 1874, he offered his larger-than-life marble bust of Copernicus to the Museo Copernicano of Rome, and a terracotta bust of Adam Mickievicz to an academy in Bologna.

Rygier also made busts of his wife and sister; of George Washington (1875); of poet Teofil Lenartowicz (exhibited at Rome in 1883); of doctor Levitoni, philosopher of Warsaw; of Leopold Kronenberg (1878, once placed on a pedestal in the rail station to Warsaw); and writer Kraszetcski.

In 1877-1879 he completed twelve larger than life statues for the Granzow Palace in Warsaw, including four caryatids sustaining a balcony; four statues of Four Seasons, and four depicting, Art, Science, Agriculture, and Industry. In an 1879 contest, he designed three sculptural groups for the Palace of the Diet of Galizia: the Genius of Galizia, Civility, and Labor. At the International competition of Moscow for the Monument to Alexander II, in October 1882, Rygier won 3rd prize for 3000 rubles. But the work was never completed.

== The competition for Adam Mickiewicz Monument ==
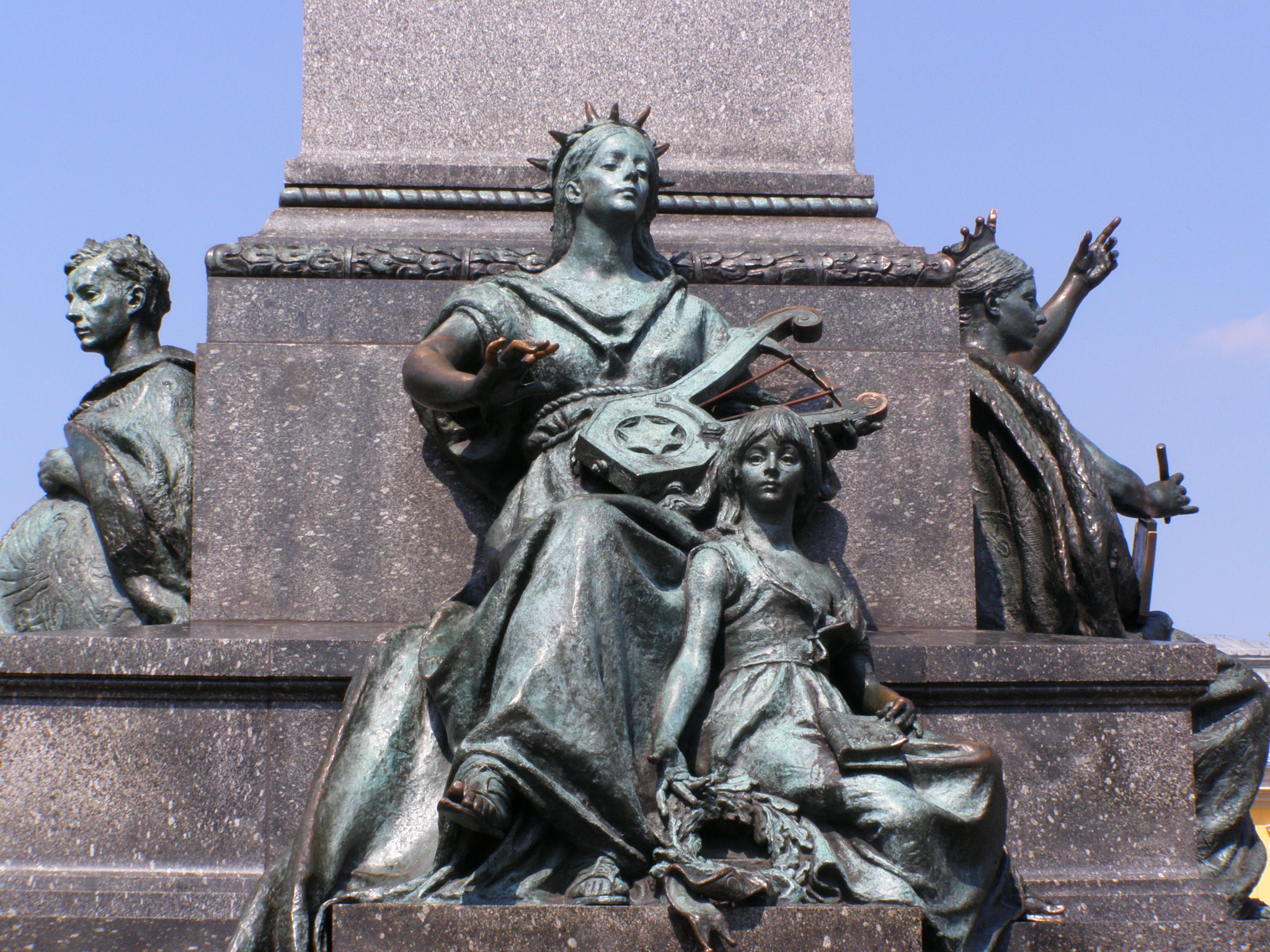
Muse of Poetry, southside

When the remains of Polish national bard Adam Mickiewicz were returned from Paris, a university youth proposed that a monument to the great poet be erected in his home town of Krakow. In the years 1882–1888, a committee was set up to conduct a public competition for the monument design. Teodor Rygier took part in all three stages of the contest, and was awarded the rights to produce the monument by popular demand. His work was commissioned ahead of that of more than 60 artists, including the renowned Cyprian Godebski, professor at the Imperial Academy of Arts in St. Petersburg from Paris, who had won first prize in the competition. The artistic committee made numerous requests to Rygier for revisions to his work, delaying its completion. The monument was finally unveiled on 16 June 1898 for the 100th anniversary of Mickiewicz's birth.

The monument design is conventional for its time. The poet is raised on the pedestal; four symbolic groups are represented on the base: Motherland i.e. Poland (front), Science and learning – an old man with a boy (side on Florianska Street), Poetry (side facing Church of St. Wojciech), and Patriotic love or Valour (facing Sukiennice Hall). All bronze figures were cast in the Nellich foundry in Rome.

Aside from his statue of Adam Mickiewicz at the Main Market Square in Kraków, Rygier also completed a sculpture in the Old Town district. This bust of painter Juliusz Kossak is featured in front of the Palace of Art at Planty Park.

== See also ==
- Adam Mickiewicz Monument, Lviv
- Adam Mickiewicz Monument, Warsaw
