= Lithuanian Liberty Union =

The Lithuanian Liberty Union (Lithuanian: Lietuvos laisvės sąjunga, LLS) was a far-right political party in Lithuania.

== History ==
The party was established in 1992 as a breakaway from the Lithuanian Freedom League, and was formally registered as a political party on 13 September 1994. It contested the 1992 elections, but received just 0.4% of the vote and failed to win a seat. In the 1996 elections it increased its vote share to 1.5%, but again failed to win a seat.

The 2000 elections saw the party's vote share fall to 1.3%, but it succeeded in winning its first seat, taken by Vytautas Šustauskas. Šustauskas was the party's candidate in the 2002–03 presidential elections, but received just 0.4% of the vote. The party lost its sole Seimas seat in the 2004 elections.

The party was dissolved in 2011 and the Union for the President of Lithuania was established as a replacement.
