= Adam Mickiewicz Monument, Kraków =

Monument in Kraków, Poland

Adam Mickiewicz Monument
- Pomnik Adama Mickiewicza (Polish)
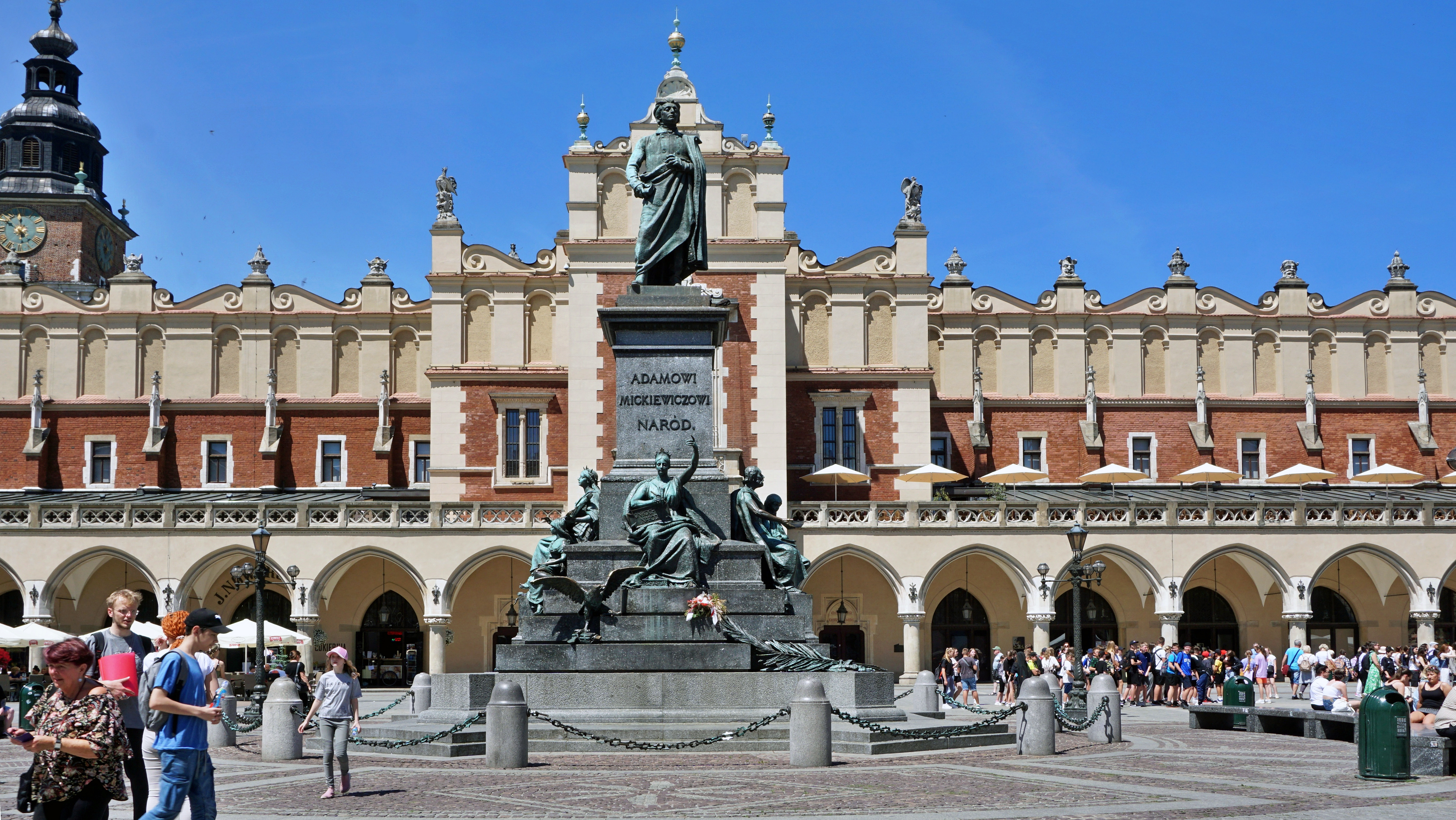
- Adam Mickiewicz Monument, Main Market Square, Kraków
- Artist: Teodor Rygier
- Completion date: 16 June 1898
- Type: Monument
- Medium: Bronze
- Subject: Adam Mickiewicz
- Location: Kraków; 50°3′41″N 19°56′16″E

Adam Mickiewicz Monument (Polish: Pomnik Adama Mickiewicza), a bronze monument located in the Main Market Square in the Old Town of Kraków, Poland.

== History ==
The statue of Adam Mickiewicz, the greatest Polish Romantic poet of the 19th century, was unveiled on June 16, 1898, on the 100th anniversary of his birth, in the presence of his daughter and son. It was designed by Teodor Rygier, a little-known sculptor at the time, who won the third and final competition for this project by popular demand ahead of over 60 artists in total, the renowned painter Jan Matejko included.

Even though the first prize was awarded to famed Cyprian Godebski, professor at the Imperial Academy of Arts in St. Petersburg from Paris, with Rygier at a close second, for the final execution a more popular design by Rygier was accepted with a contract signed in November 1889. At the poet's feet are four allegoric groups symbolising the Motherland (from the face of the monument along Sienna Street), Science (facing north), Courage (facing Sukiennice Hall) and Poetry (facing Church of St. Wojciech, south). The inscription on the pedestal reads: "To Adam Mickiewicz, the Nation".

The monument came into being at a studio on Długa Street under the supervision of an artistic committee. All the figures were cast in the Nellich foundry in Rome. The final location of the monument was not decided at once, with at least three other city squares taken into consideration. Ultimately, it was the city Mayor who suggested that the structure be placed in the Main Market Square instead.

In 1940 the monument was destroyed by the Nazis following German invasion of Poland. It was not to be seen in the Square until its restoration in 1955. However, most of the figures were recovered from a Hamburg scrap metal heap in 1946, which allowed the restoration of the Monument's original appearance.

== Cultural significance ==
Adam Mickiewicz had himself never been to Kraków. In 1890, 35 years after his death, his remains were brought there from Paris and ceremoniously laid to rest in the St. Leonard's Crypt under the Wawel Cathedral, which partially inspired the project with the original idea put forward by university youth. Every year on Christmas Eve, the Adam Mickiewicz Monument is decorated with flowers by the florists of Kraków.

== Gallery ==
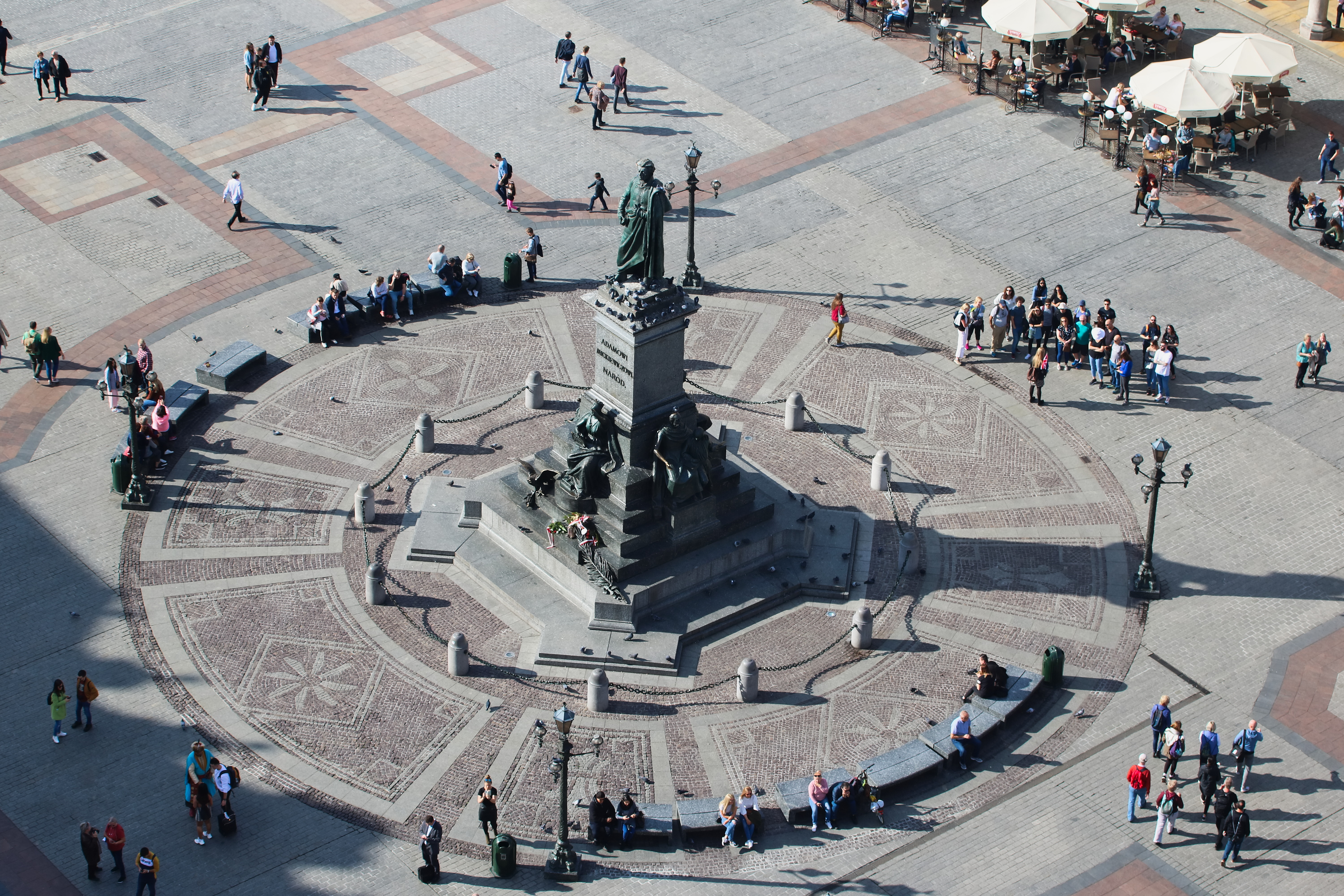
View from St. Mary's Church

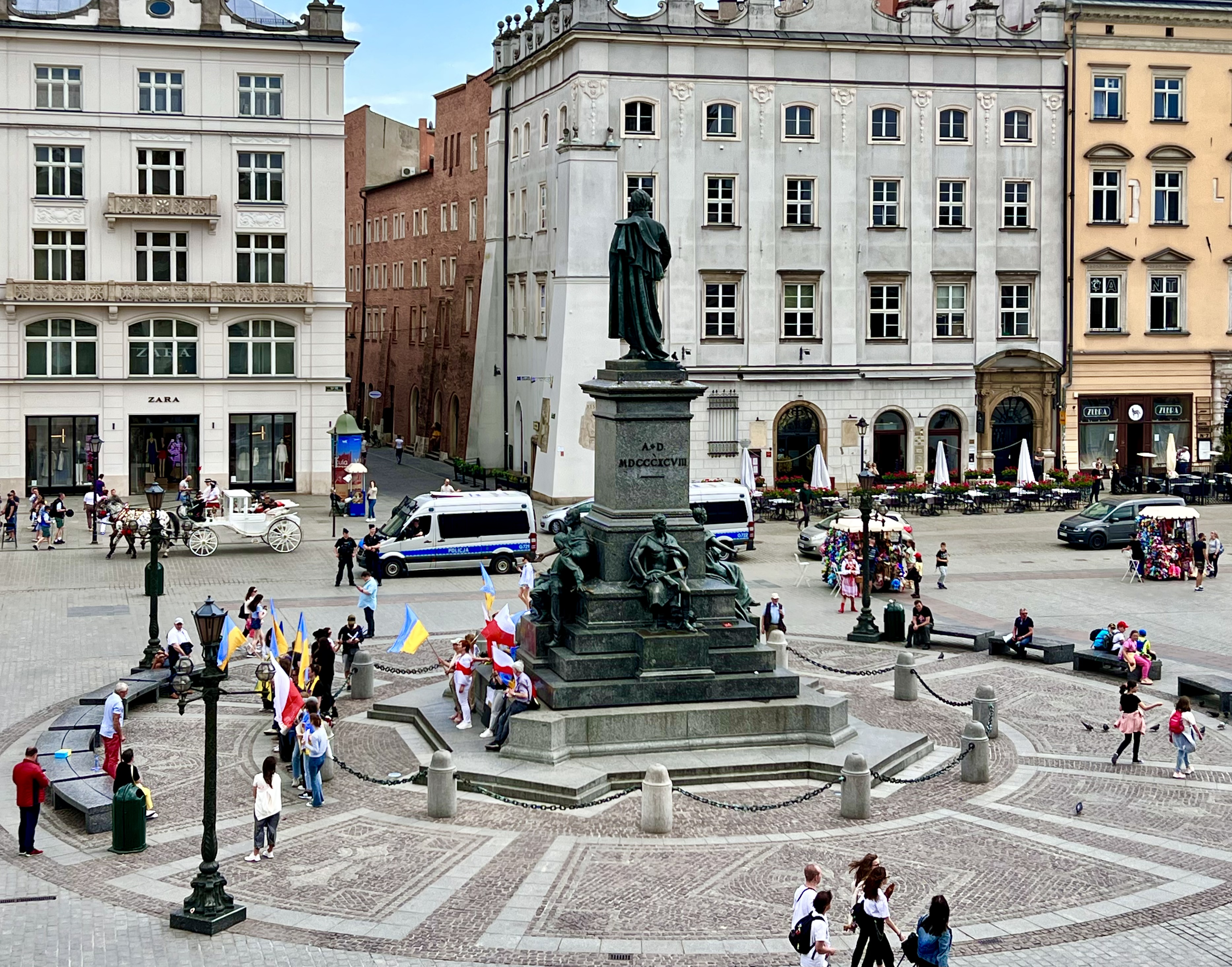
General view of the monument seen from the Cloth Hall

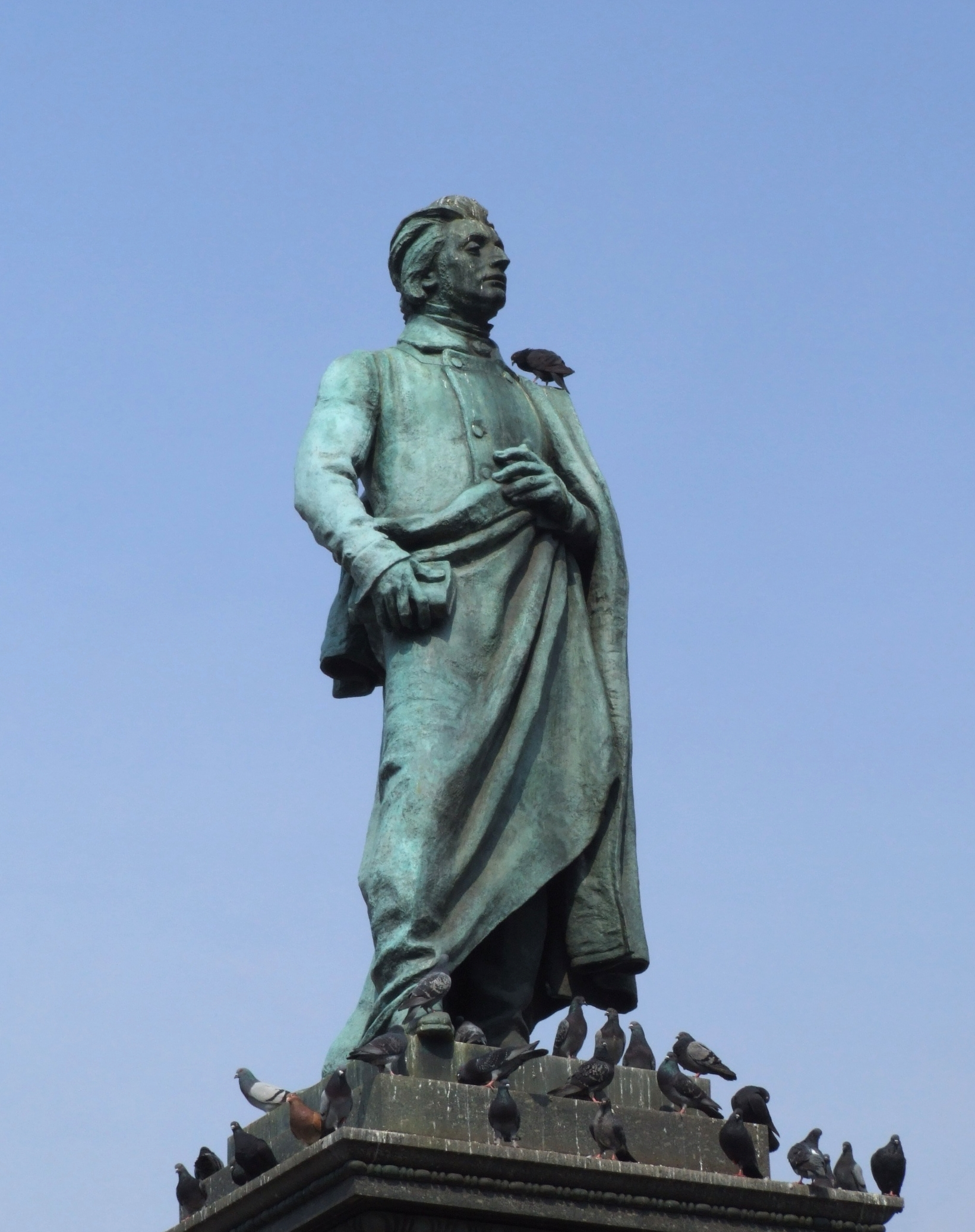
Statue of Adam Mickiewicz

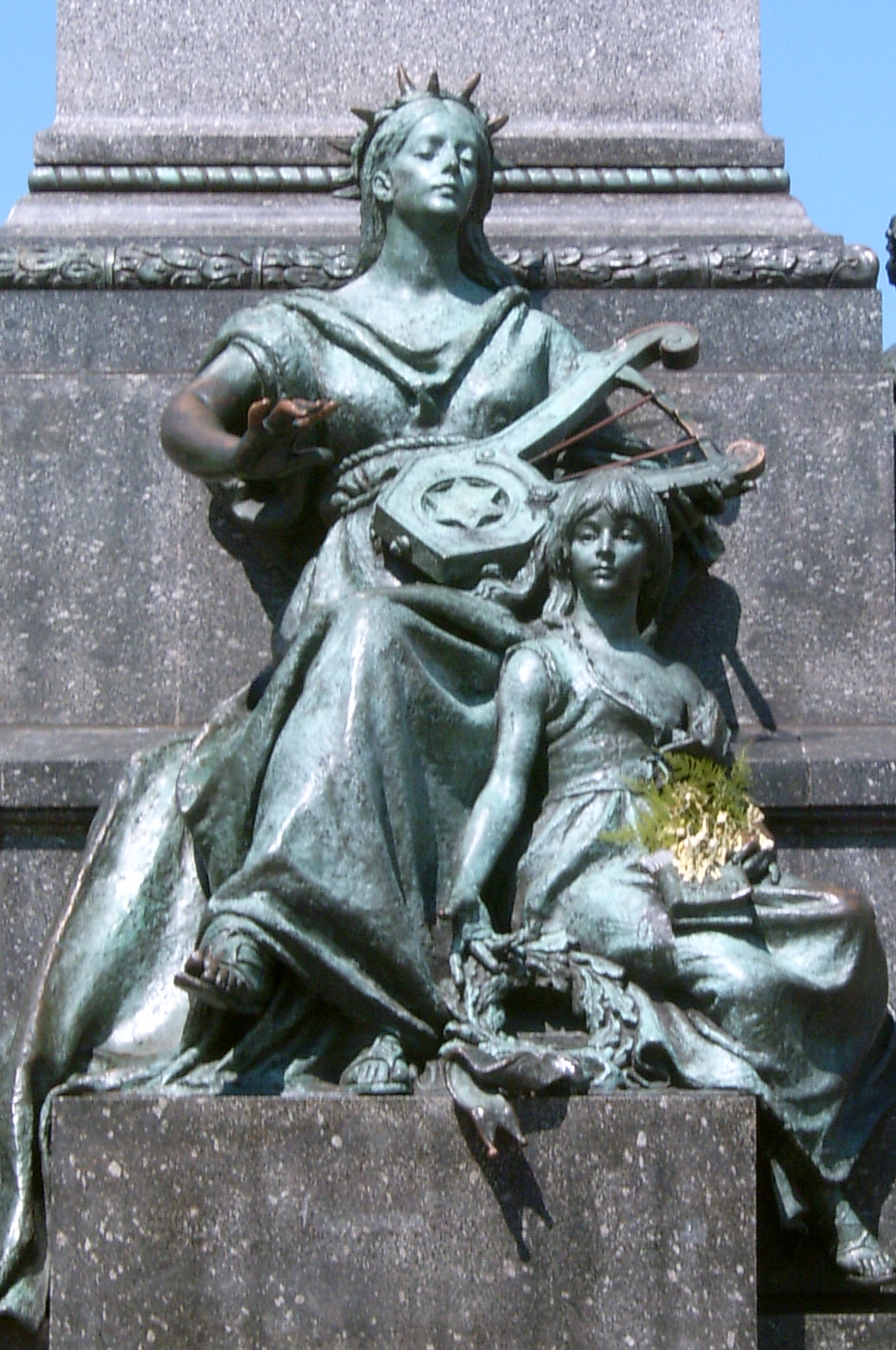
Allegory of poetry

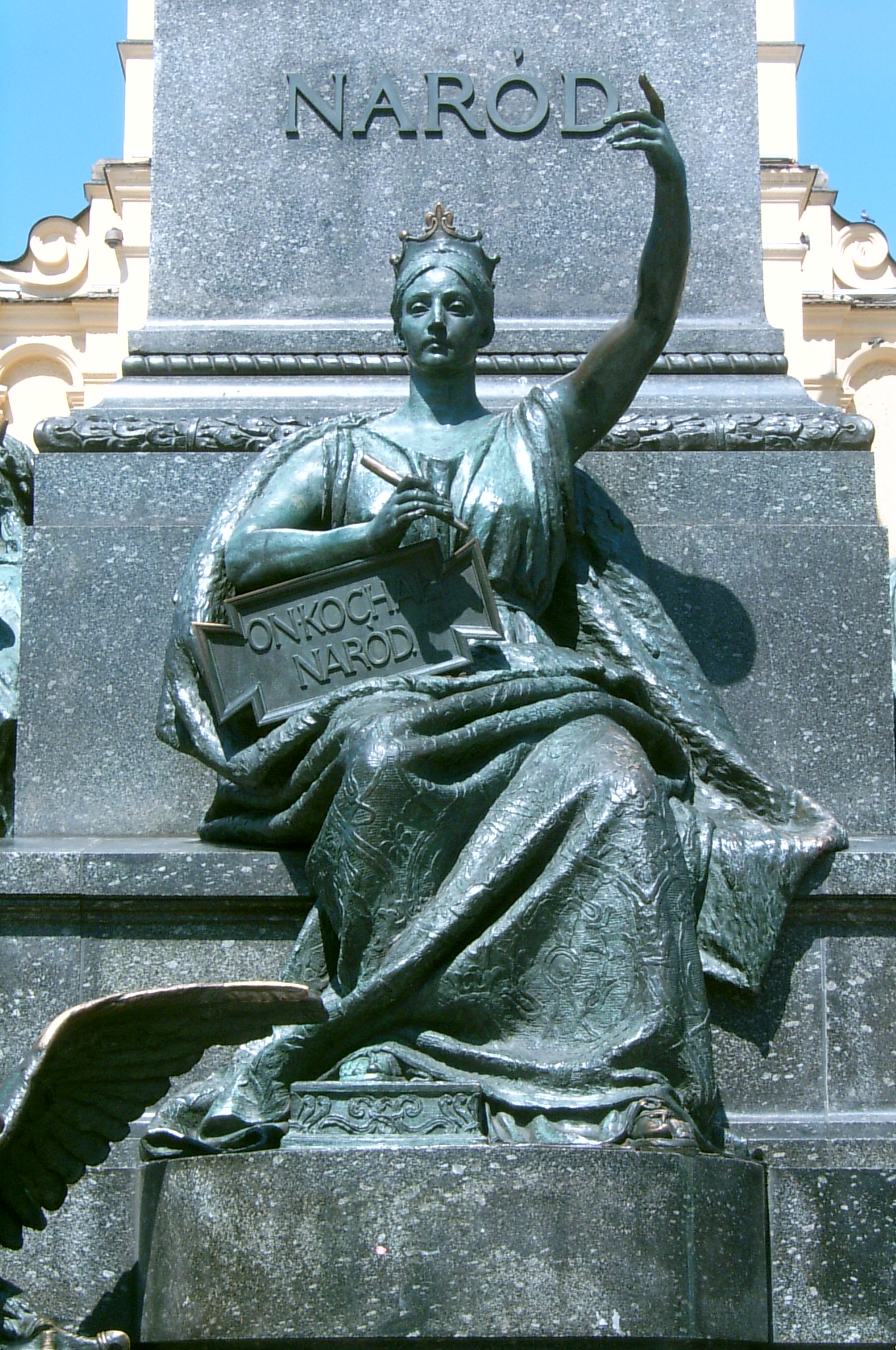
Allegory of the homeland

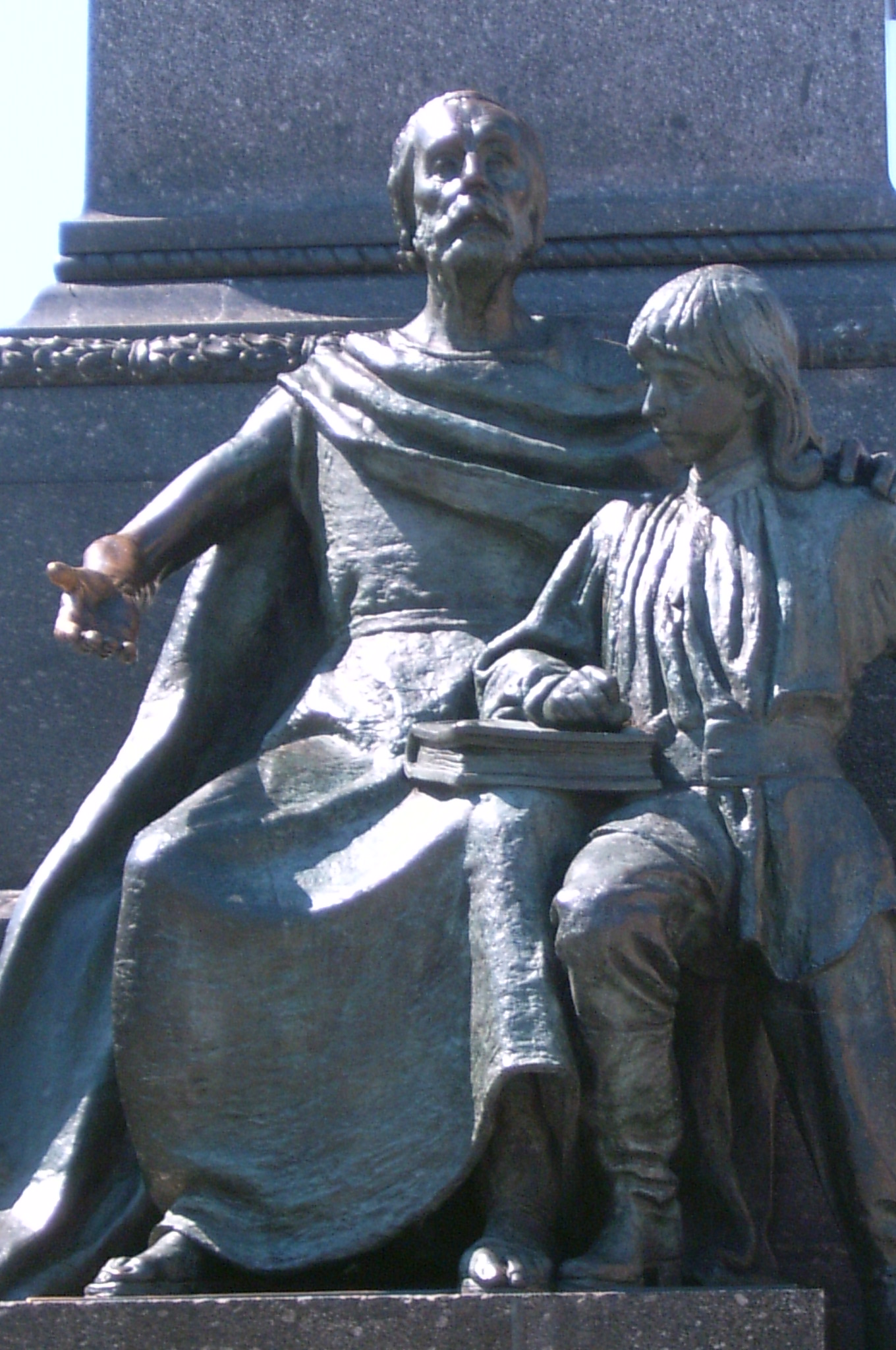
Allegory of science

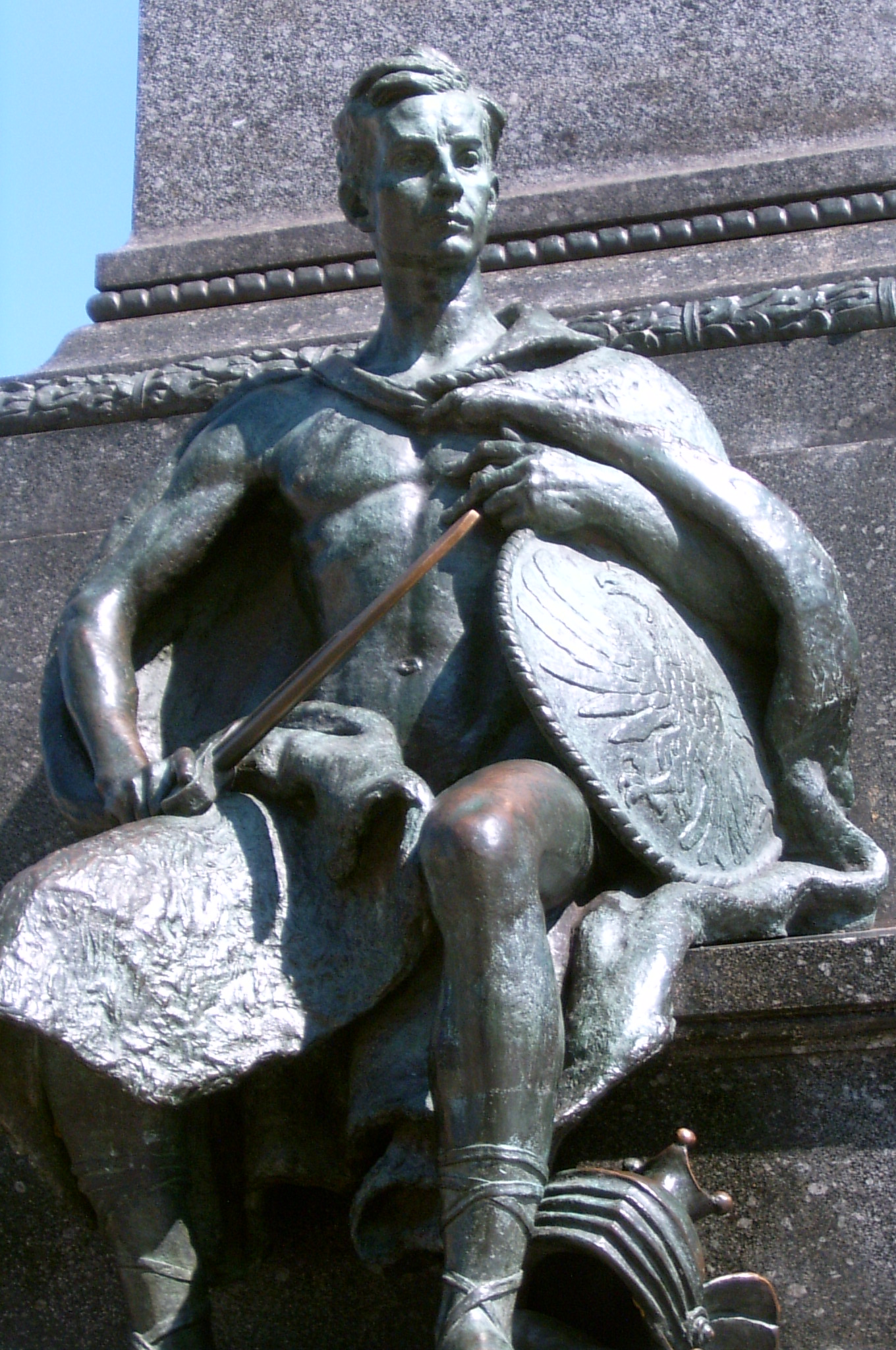
Allegory of bravery

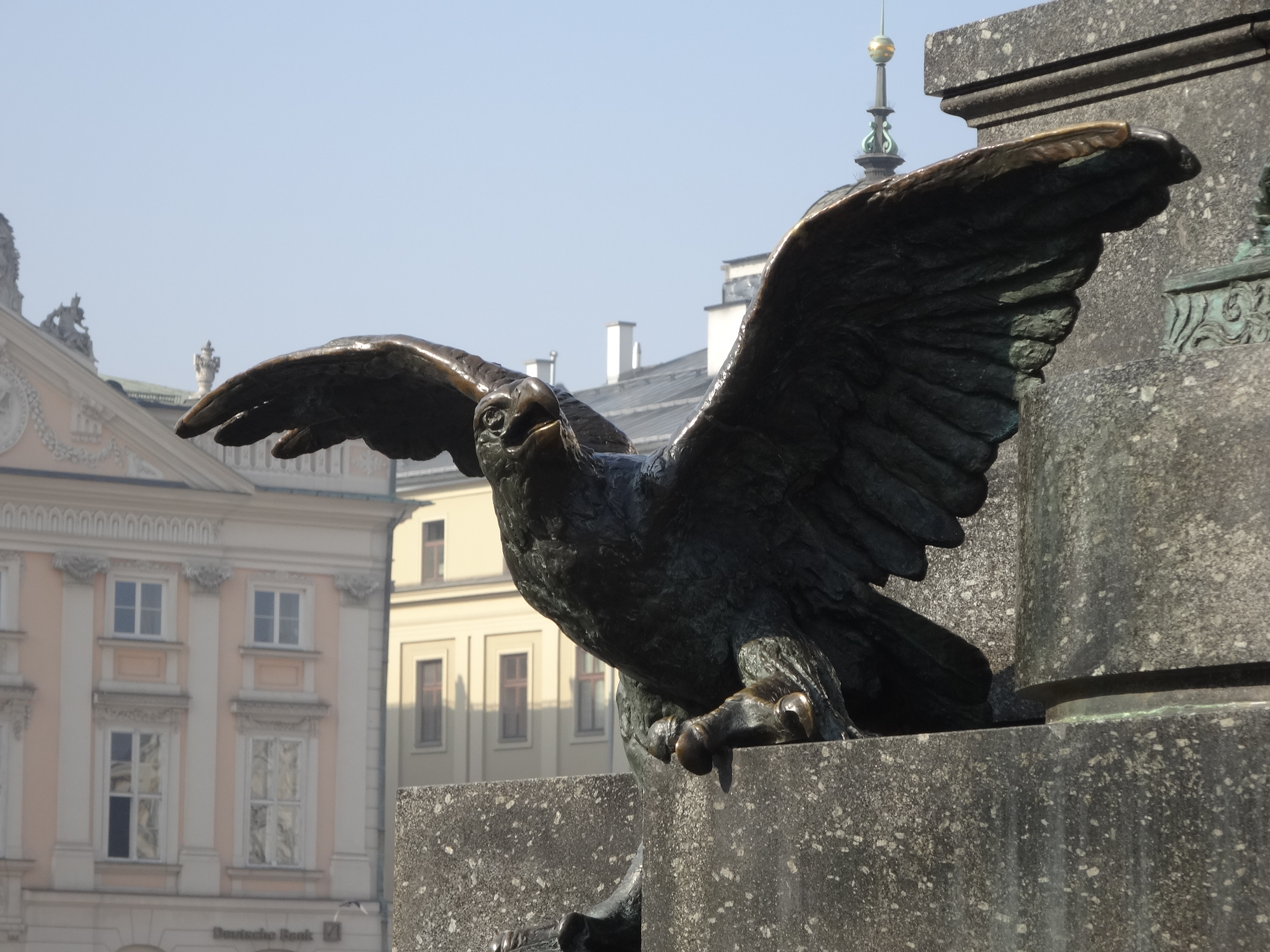
Eagle sculpture

== See also ==
- Adam Mickiewicz Monument (disambiguation) for other monuments of Mickiewicz around the world
