= Church of St. Anne, Vilnius =

Roman Catholic church in Vilnius, Lithuania

St. Anne's Church Šv. Onos bažnyčia
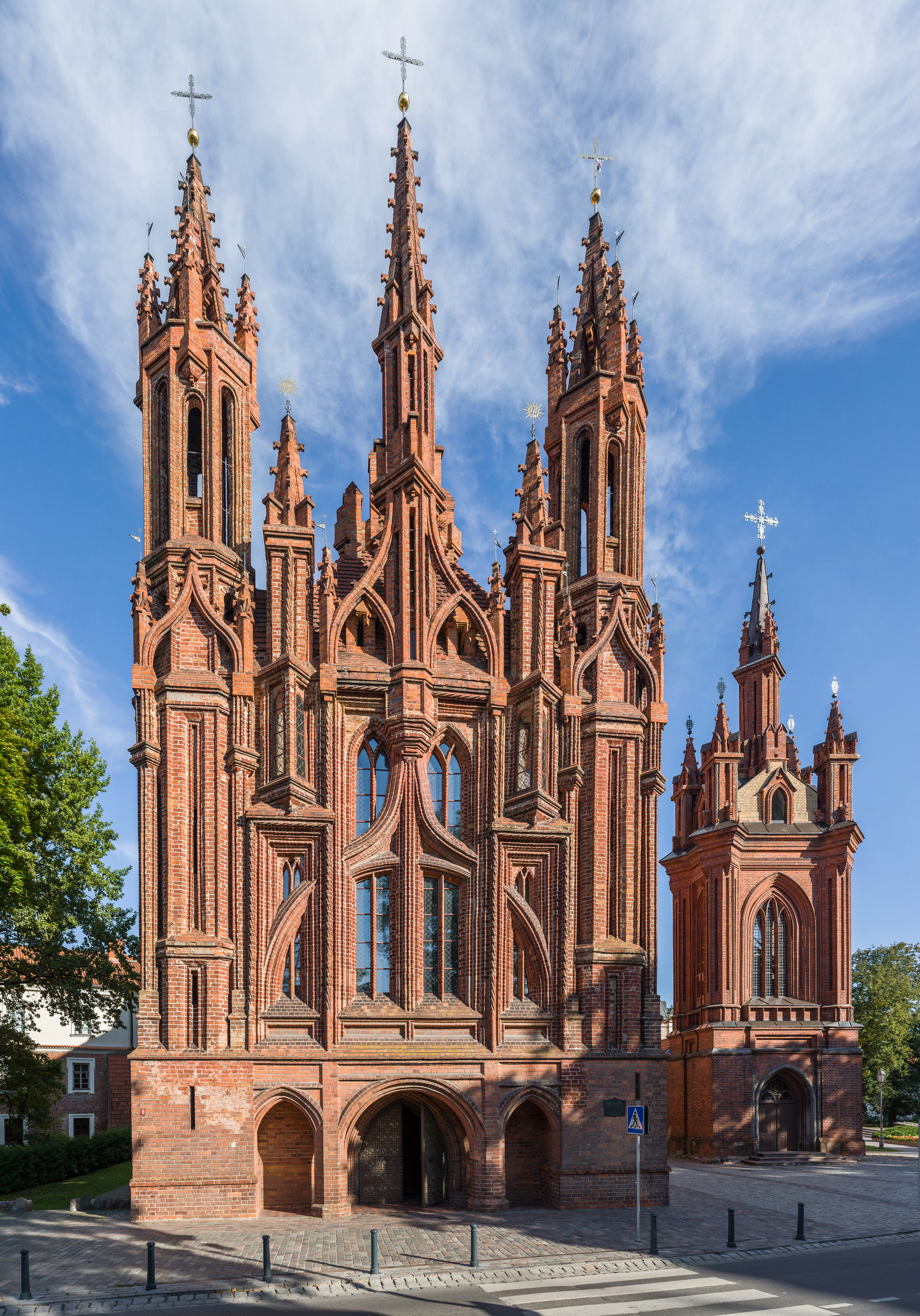
- Façade of Saint Anne's (2014)

Religion
- Affiliation: Roman Catholic
- Diocese: Old Town
- Year consecrated: 1500

Location
- Location: Vilnius, Lithuania
- Interactive map of St. Anne's Church; Šv. Onos bažnyčia
- Coordinates: 54°40′59″N 25°17′36″E

Architecture
- Architect: Michael Enkinger
- Type: Church
- Style: Late Gothic and Brick Gothic
- Completed: 1500

Specifications
- Direction of façade: West
- Materials: clay bricks

Website
- onosbaznycia.lt

UNESCO World Heritage Site
- Official name: Vilnius Old Town
- Type: Cultural
- Criteria: Cultural: (ii), (iv)
- Designated: 1994
- Reference no.: 541
- UNESCO region: Europe

St. Anne's Church (Lithuanian: Šv. Onos bažnyčia; Polish: Kościół św. Anny) is a Roman Catholic church in Vilnius' Old Town, on the right bank of the Vilnia river established circa 1495–1500. It is a prominent example of both Flamboyant and Brick Gothic styles. St. Anne's is a prominent landmark in the Vilnius Old Town that enabled the district to be named as a UNESCO World Heritage Site, and is one of the most interesting examples of Gothic architecture in Lithuania.

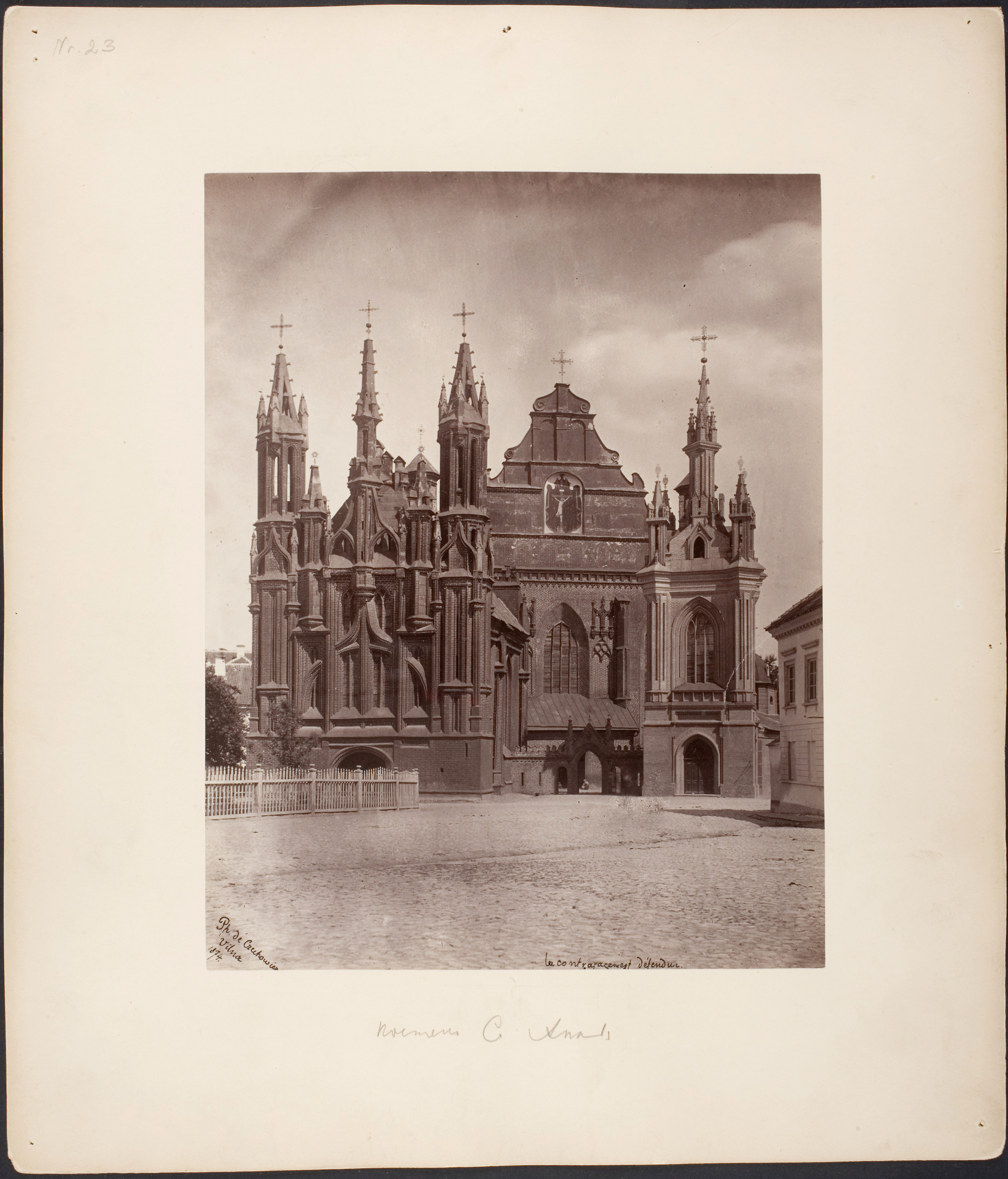
St. Anne's Church by Józef Czechowicz (1874)

== History ==
The first church at this site, constructed of wood, was built for Anna, Grand Duchess of Lithuania, the first wife of Vytautas the Great. Originally intended for the use of Catholic Germans and other visiting Catholics, it was destroyed by a fire in 1419.

The present brick church was constructed on the initiative of the King of Poland and Grand Duke of Lithuania Alexander I Jagiellon in 1495–1500; the exterior of the church has remained almost unchanged since then.

=== 16th century ===
A reconstruction of the church, funded by Mikołaj Radziwiłł the Black and Jerzy Radziwiłł, was carried out following severe fire damage, in 1582. Abraomas Kulvietis preached in the church between 1538 and 1541.

=== 18th century ===
In 1747, the church underwent a repair under the supervision of Johann Christoph Glaubitz. In 1762, side arches of the main portal were hidden in order to strengthen the support for the facade.

=== 19th century ===
According to a well-known legend, Emperor Napoleon, after seeing the church during the Franco-Russian War in 1812, expressed a wish to carry the church home with him to Paris 'in the palm of his hand'.

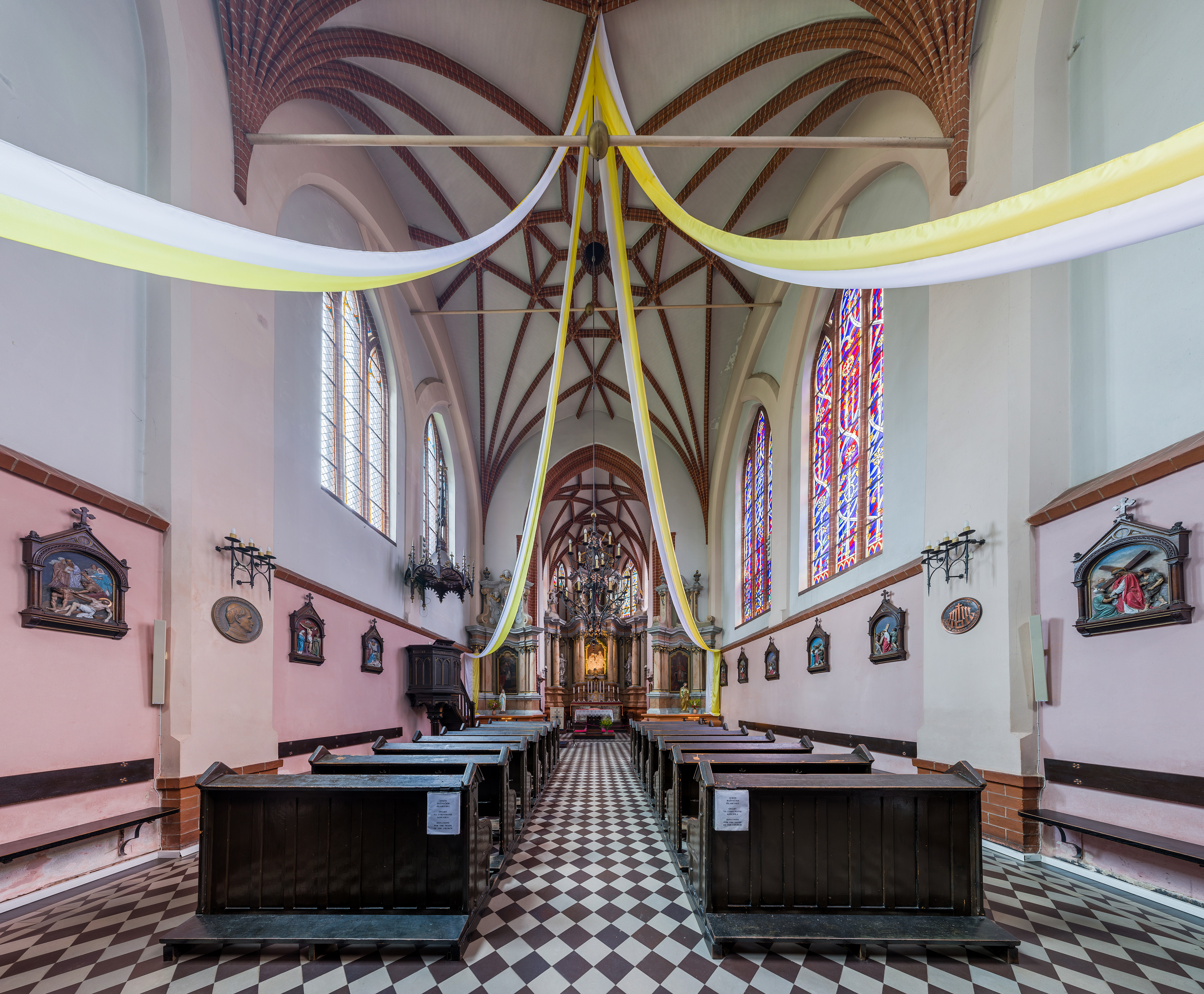
Interior, looking to the main altar

=== 20th century ===
The church was renovated in 1902–1909 when the side arches were uncovered and the walls were strengthened with iron. The initiator and organizer of the renovation was Father Jan Józef Łaboda, while the author of the project was Józef Pius Dziekoński.

==== Soviet occupation of Lithuania ====
During the Soviet occupation, the church remained open and was even renovated between 1960–1970 when the towers were in bad shape.

On 23 August 1987, the Lithuanian Liberty League held a rally in a square near the church and the Adam Mickiewicz Monument to protest the ongoing Soviet occupation, which was broken up by the Soviet militsiya.

=== 21st century ===
Most recent reconstruction followed in 2009: the roofing was replaced, facade elements were reinforced and long-missing side spires were rebuilt.

On 13 June 2018 St. Anne's Church was dedicated by The Archbishop of Vilnius, Gintaras Grušas, to be used exclusively to celebrate the Tridentine Mass.

== Architecture ==
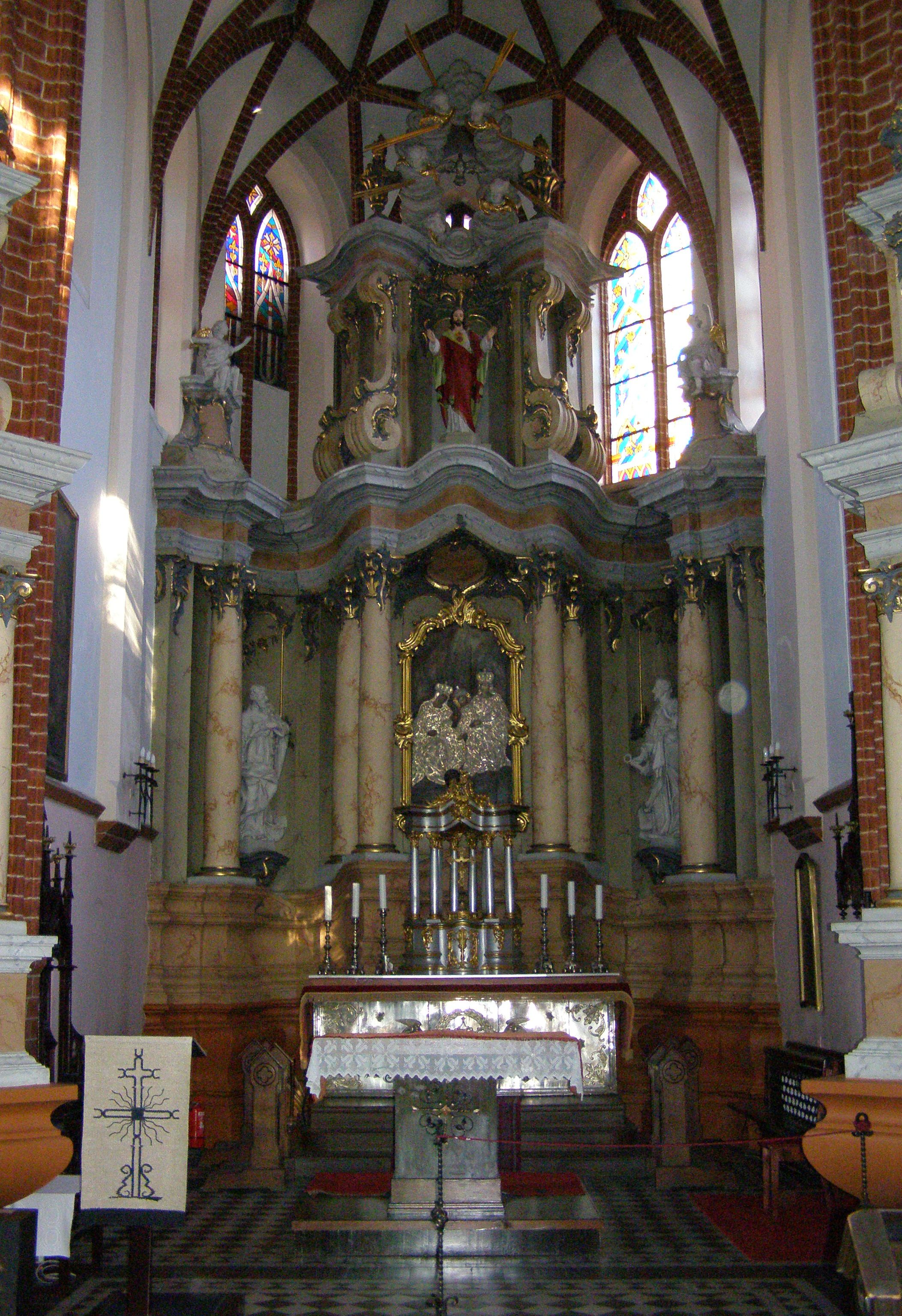
Main altar

The design of the church building is attributed to either Michael Enkinger, the architect of a church of the same name in Warsaw, or to Benedikt Rejt. However, neither of the attributions is attested by written sources. St. Anne's Church is part of an ensemble, comprising the much larger Gothic Church of St. Francis and Bernadine, as well as a monastery.

A novel approach to bricks as a construction material was employed in the church's construction. The main façade, designed in the Flamboyant Gothic style, is its most striking feature. Traditional Gothic elements and shapes were used in unique ways; Gothic arches are framed by rectangular elements dominating a symmetrical and proportionate façade, creating an impression of dynamism. According to Lithuanian architect and art historian Vladas Drėma, patterns from the Columns of Gediminas are echoed in the church's façade.

The church has one nave and two towers. It was built using 33 different kinds of clay bricks and painted in red. The interior is decorated in the Baroque style, as is its altar. The imitative neo-Gothic bell tower, constructed in the 1870s to Chagin's designs, stands nearby.

== See also ==
- List of Gothic Cathedrals in Europe

== Bibliography ==
- Jackiewicz, Mieczysław, ed. (2009). Encyklopedia Ziemi Wileńskiej [Encyclopedia of Vilnius Land] (in Polish). Vol. 7. Bydgoszcz. ISBN 9788387865641.
