= Vytautas Šustauskas =

Lithuanian politician (1945–2023)

Member of the Seimas
- In office 30 October 2000 – 11 November 2004
- Preceded by: Stanislovas Buškevičius
- Succeeded by: Rimantas Jonas Dagys
- Constituency: Šilainiai

Mayor of Kaunas City Municipality
- In office 13 April 2000 – 30 October 2000
- Preceded by: Henrikas Tamulis
- Succeeded by: Erikas Tamašauskas

Personal details
- Born: 19 March 1945 Kražiai, Lithuanian SSR, USSR
- Died: 21 June 2023 (aged 78) Kaunas, Lithuania
- Party: Union of the Fighters for Lithuania
- Other political affiliations: Lithuanian Liberty League (1989-1992); Lithuanian Liberty Union (1992–2011)

Vytautas Šustauskas (19 March 1945 – 21 June 2023) was a controversial Lithuanian politician who was leader of the Lithuanian Liberty Union and Union of the Fighters for Lithuania political parties. A self-styled "king of the beggars", he was elected Mayor of Kaunas in 2000 and became a member of the Seimas in the same year. He was known for protests against poverty, inequality, membership in the European Union and NATO, and pride parades.

Šustauskas died on 21 June 2023, at the age of 78.

== Background ==
Šustauskas was born in Kražiai in 1945, to a family of six children. He graduated from a shipbuilding tekhnikum in Klaipėda in 1964 and became employed as an engineer after three years of service in the Soviet Army. He moved to Kaunas in 1972. In 1989, he became a member of the pro-independence movement Lithuanian Liberty League and the chairman of its Kaunas group. He was known for heavy drinking. KGB agents operating in the Lithuanian SSR reportedly sought to compromise Šustauskas in the press by ordering Kaunas city police to regularly send him to a drunk tank.

Šustauskas was in conflict with the organization's leader, dissident Antanas Terleckas. In February 1992, he interrupted a talk show on LTV to deliver a public 15 minute letter in which he blamed Terleckas for the organization's deficiencies and accused him of being an agent of the KGB.

== Political career ==
=== "King of the beggars" ===
Šustauskas transformed the Kaunas group of the LLL into the Lithuanian Liberty Union (Lithuanian: Lietuvos laisvės sąjunga), referred to as a right-wing, far-right, populist and antisemitic party.

Šustauskas was known for his public controversial actions. From 7 to 10 September 1997, he organized the "March of the Beggars" (Lithuanian: "Ubagų žygis"), in which 45 people marched from Kaunas to the Seimas in Vilnius for three days and then organized a protest against poverty and inequality. In 1999, during the first charity Viennese Ball organized in the Vilnius Town Hall, Šustauskas organized an unsanctioned "Beggar Ball" (Lithuanian: "Ubagų balius") in front of the building, where over 200 people participated and protested against the ball. Because of the protest and later death threats by Liberty Union members, Austrian ambassador to Lithuania Florian Haug cancelled the planned annual event.

=== Mayor of Kaunas ===
In the 2000 municipal election in Kaunas, Šustauskas's Liberty Union received the largest number of votes and 11 seats in the municipal council. Šustauskas was elected Mayor of Kaunas. The council was divided between several parties and Šustauskas struggled to organize its work. During one council meeting, he reportedly punched a member of the council in the face for "saying nonsense".

Šustauskas was connected to the "Doctors" (Lithuanian: "Daktarai"), a famous organized crime group established in Kaunas. The Seimas Ethics and Procedures Commission received declassified telephone recordings from the State Security Department of Lithuania, in which Šustauskas discusses various matters with Henrikas Daktaras, the leader of the crime group. As the daily newspaper Respublika reported at the time, these recordings revealed that Šustauskas not only took care of the affairs of Daktaras' son Enrikas, who had been arrested, but also asked Daktaras to order certain members of the Kaunas municipal council how to vote, such as the head of "Kauno grūdai", Tautvydas Barštys.

=== Member of the Seimas ===
Šustauskas was elected to the Seimas in the Šilainiai constituency in the 2000 Lithuanian parliamentary election. He remained in office until 2004.

As a Seimas member, Šustauskas was known for his controversial statements. In an interview on Swedish television in 2001, Šustauskas claimed that "if not for the Germans, I might have shined the shoes of the Jews in Liberty Avenue" and "it would be no secret if I told you that Jews own all the world's capital. <...> They know money.". In the same year, he claimed that Lithuania needed an equivalent of the 1999 Armenian parliament shooting, stating that "it (the Armenian National Assembly) started working differently when they came and blew a few of them away on the spot".

Šustauskas opposed Lithuania's accession to the European Union, claiming that it would be a form of economic slavery and compared the country's future in the organization to that of the Old Prussians.

In 2005, a video of Šustauskas kissing and licking the microphone in the Seimas became an internet meme.

=== Later activity ===
Šustauskas ran in the Marios constituency in Klaipėda in the 2004 Lithuanian parliamentary election, but only received 2.59% of the votes and finished last. He continued participating in politics, but slid to irrelevancy and poverty. In 2009, it was reported that he was seeking support from Caritas, claiming to live on a 720 LTL retirement pension, but paying 400 LTL every month for an expensive car he broke in a car crash in 2005. Later, he worked as a taxi driver.

Šustauskas sued the Social Security Fund (Lithuanian: SoDra) in 2012 for refusing to pay his sickness benefit unless he opened a bank account, whereas he claimed that he refuses to open an account in any bank which is controlled by foreign capital. The court affirmed his position.

In 2013, Šustauskas, alongside other anti-LGBT politicians such as Petras Gražulis, protested against Baltic Pride in Vilnius. Questioned by police on the contents of his pants, he answered "bybį" (English: "a dick") and was accused of insulting police officers. He defended himself by claiming that he did not know about the word "genitalijos" (English: "genitals") at time of the incident.

Šustauskas organized a protest against corruption and NATO membership in Vilnius in 2016, during which he was physically attacked by his party's former member Jurij Subotin.

He was hospitalized in April 2023 and died on 21 June 2023. He was buried in Kražiai on 24 June.

Seimas
Preceded by Stanislovas Buškevičius	Member of the Seimas for Šilainiai; 2000–2004	Succeeded by Rimantas Jonas Dagys
