= Visvaldas Mažonas =

Lithuanian politician (1941–2025)

Visvaldas Marijus Mažonas
- Born: August 25, 1941; Lithuania
- Died: March 25, 2025 (aged 83)
- Occupations: Politician; radical right-wing activist
- Known for: Leader in the Lithuanian Patriotic Union; far-right activism

Visvaldas Marijus Mažonas (25 August 1941 – 25 March 2025) was a Lithuanian politician who was a controversial figure of the radical right-wing. He was a leader of a branch of the Lithuanian Patriotic Union (Lietuvos patriotų sąjunga) in Kaunas and participated in the 2004 election to the Seimas (Lithuanian Parliament).

== Life and career ==
Before entering politics, Mažonas held various jobs as a policeman, driver, security guard, and construction worker. He entered the political scene after the impeachment of Rolandas Paksas, former President of Lithuania. During the impeachment, Mažonas supported Paksas, attended various protest meetings, and vowed to "maintain order". During one incident, when he attempted to "keep order", Mažonas hit a high school student, who opposed Paksas. The event attracted media attention and Mažonas faced criminal charges (eventually reduced to misdemeanor). Paksas did not immediately distance himself from Mažonas.

Mažonas was known for disorderly conduct, provocations, insulting speeches, threats to overthrow the government, and displaying stylized Nazi swastikas. He and his supporters often wore black uniforms. During the trial of the suspected Holocaust perpetrator Algimantas Dailidė, Mažonas held signs supporting Dailidė. In another incident, he protested a monument to Danielius Dolskis, a Lithuanian Jew. Mažonas often collaborated with another extremist, Mindaugas Murza.

Mažonas died on 25 March 2025, at the age of 83.
