= Justas Vincas Paleckis =

Lithuanian politician

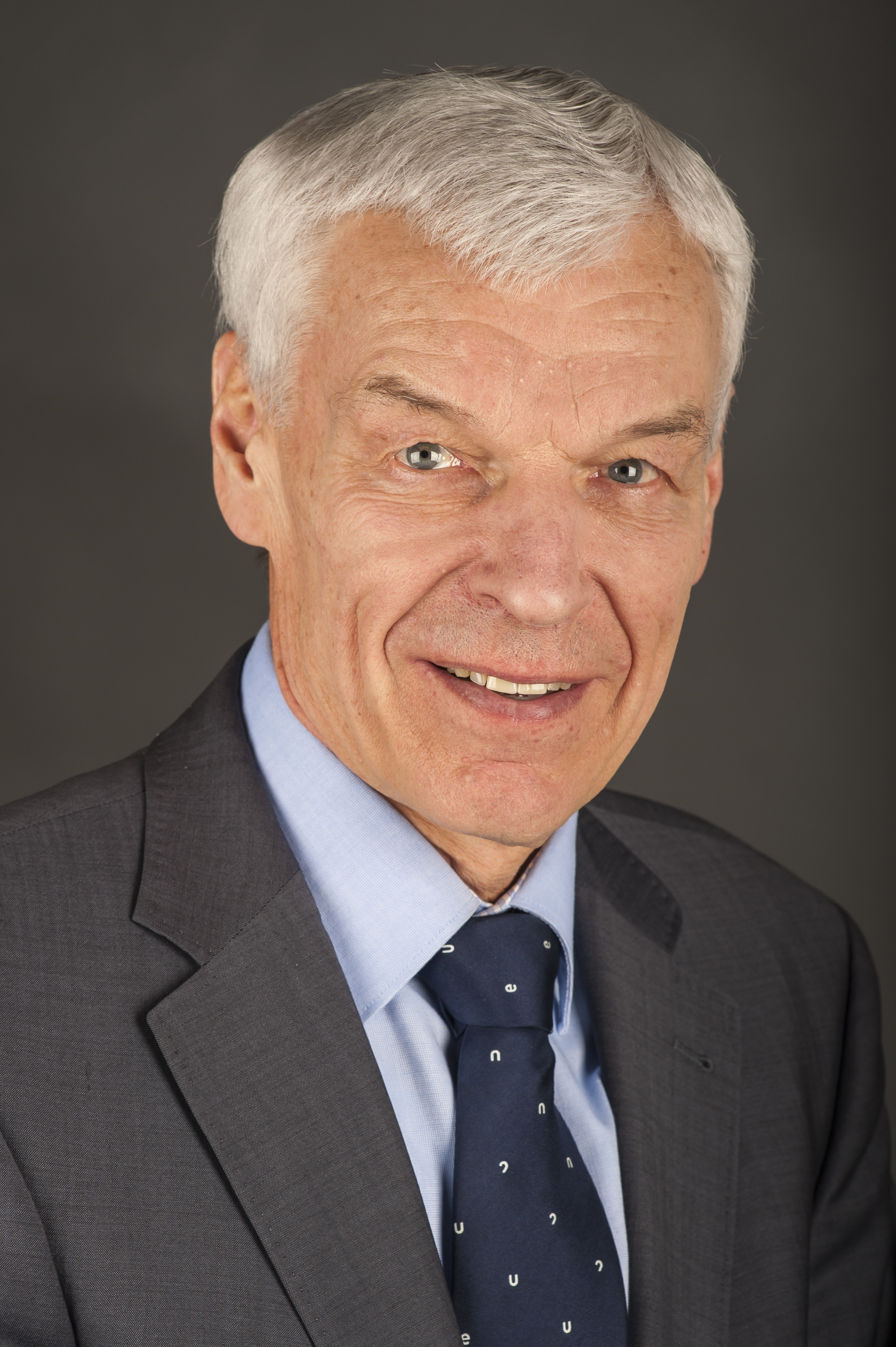
Justas Vincas Paleckis (2014)

Justas Vincas Paleckis (born 1 January 1942 in Kuybyshev, current Samara) is a Lithuanian ex-communist and politician, signatory of the Act of the Re-Establishment of the State of Lithuania, and Member of the European Parliament for the Social Democratic Party of Lithuania.

He is also a member of the Party of European Socialists. Justas was born in Samara, Russia where his family resided during the Second World War. His father Justas Paleckis served as the Acting President of Lithuania in 1940 and later as the head of state of the Lithuanian SSR until 1967. After the war, the family returned to Lithuania, where he finished school in 1959 and then went on to study journalism at Vilnius University in 1964.

== Personal life ==
J. Paleckis is married. He has two sons, Algirdas and Rimvydas, and one daughter, Justina.
