= Front Party =

Front Party Fronto partija
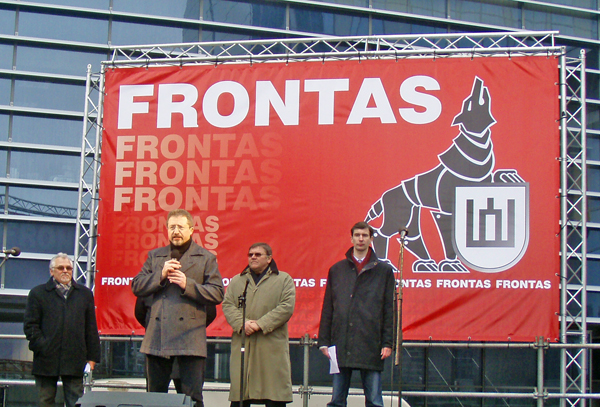
- Leader: Algirdas Paleckis
- Founded: 2008
- Dissolved: December 19, 2009
- Merged into: Socialist People's Front
- Headquarters: Vilnius, Kaštonų g. 4
- Ideology: Democratic socialism (officially); Socialism; Left-wing nationalism
- Political position: Far-left
- Colours: Red

Website
- fronte.lt

The Front Party (Lithuanian: Fronto partija, abbreviated FRONTAS) was a socialist political party in Lithuania established in 2008 by Algirdas Paleckis. It participated in the 2008 Lithuanian parliamentary elections but failed to reach the 5% cutoff and sent no members to the Seimas.

On December 19, 2009, the party merged with the Lithuanian Socialist Party to establish a new political party, the Socialist People's Front.

== Ideology ==
The party is considered socialist, clearly advancing leftist values and advocating reforms to the Lithuanian Constitution. The party supports an interventionist policy on economic matters ("The market must be regulated and limited").

The party promised during the parliamentary elections to reduce the number of Seimas members to 121 and to expand the powers of the president.

== Socialist People's Front ==
On December 19, 2009, the Front Party merged with the Lithuanian Socialist Party at a meeting in Vilnius. The new party was named the Socialist People's Front (Lithuanian: Socialistinis liaudies frontas). At the meeting, held at Vilnius University, 102 party delegates participated. In voting for the merger, 96 delegates were in favor, three against, and one abstained. The new party was registered at the Ministry of Justice, and its ideology was democratic socialist.

== Notable members ==
- Algirdas Paleckis, leader of the party from its creation to dissolution
- Audrius Butkevičius (2008–2009), one of the most active members, former minister of National Defence

== Controversy ==
According to investigation by the State Security Department of Lithuania, Paleckis was supported by the business group MG Baltic, led by Darius Mockus, throughout his political career and maintained ties with the group even after the establishment of the Front Party.
