= Adam Mickiewicz Monument, Vilnius =

Monument in Vilnius, Lithuania

Coordinates: 54°40′58.12″N 25°17′35.96″E

Adam Mickiewicz Monument in Vilnius, Lithuania is a monument in the vicinity of the Saint Anne's Church and the Bernardine Monastery, by Maironio Street (St. Anne's Street before 1945) along the shores of the Neris River.

== History ==
The first design proposed for a monument of Adam Mickiewicz for Vilnius was promoted by Zbigniew Pronaszko of Vilnius University (then, Stefan Batory University in the Second Polish Republic). However, in May 1925, a contest was declared for the proposed monument. The period for submitting designs was extended a number of times thanks to the deep interest in the project by the artistic scene, with 67 designs ultimately submitted. The jury consisted of Vilnius's Municipal authorities and representatives of the arts scene, with General Lucjan Żeligowski at the helm.

First prize went to Avant-Garde artist Stanisław Szukalski, Second Prize to Rafał Jachimowicz, with the third prize awarded to Mieczysław Lubelski. According to Szukalski's design Mickiewicz was naked, lying upon a sacrificial altar. The artist had the sculpture situated on a large pedestal in the shape of an Aztec pyramid. A White Eagle- Poland's national symbol was perched at the figure's side where it symbolically drank blood from the poet's wound.

Szukalski's design was highly divisive, with strong emotions coming to the surface that were for and against the design, among Poland's intelligentsia, leadership, art critics as well as ordinary individuals. The polarized atmosphere led the monument committee to arrange for a new contest, this time consisting of only concepts by artists that were invited. The winner was Henryk Kuna, whose proposal was chosen. However, due to a number of problems involving financing as well as a suitable location, the monument's construction dragged on. With the outbreak of World War II and the incorporation of Vilnius into Lithuania, the project was abandoned.

▸ This is at total variance with what we read on Lithuanian Wikipedia, where no monument by Szukalski is mentioned, nor anything answering to the description of a nude man on an altar. Instead, there, the monument is described — with a photograph of its inauguration in 1924 — as a cubist-style standing statue of the man.

== Today's monument ==
The project was later revived in the 1980s, by Lithuanian sculptor Gediminas Jokūbonis, architect of the surrounding square: Vytautas Edmundas Čekanauskas. The monument was unveiled on April 18, 1984. The granite, from which the monument was carved was brought from Volhynia. The monument depicts Adam Mickiewicz leaning against a broken column. The entire composition measure 4.5 meters in height. Around the monument the first patriotic meeting that gave rise to the Independence Movement took place in 1987. In 1996, bas-reliefs from the never completed monument of Adama Mickiewicza by Henryk Kuna were placed around the monument. There are currently 6 bas-reliefs (out of 12 that were originally planned). They depicts scenes from Mickiewicz's work Dziady (Forefather's Eve):

- At the Senator ("U Senatora")
- The shadow of the evil lord ("Widmo złego pana")
- Konrad's cell ("Cela Konrada")
- At the cemetery ("Na cmentarzu")
- Konrad's meeting with Fr. Peter ("Spotkanie Konrada z ks. Piotrem")
- The road to exile ("Droga na zesłanie")

The bas-reliefs are intended to create one composition with the monument.
