= 2014 Lithuanian constitutional referendum =

- 29 June 2014
- I approve the amendment of articles 9, 47 and 147 of the Constitution of the Republic of Lithuania
- Outcome: Proposal failed as less than 50% of registered voters voted in favour

Results
Choice	Votes	%
Yes	269,049	72.83%
No	100,375	27.17%
Valid votes	369,424	97.17%
Invalid or blank votes	10,754	2.83%
Total votes	380,178	100.00%
Registered voters/turnout	2,538,430	14.98%

A constitutional referendum was held in Lithuania on 29 June 2014. Proposed amendments to articles 9, 47 and 147 of the constitution would have reduced the number of signatures required to call a referendum from 300,000 to 100,000, prevent foreigners from owning land in the country, and require all decisions related to the exploitation and extraction of natural resources that would have national and local importance to require approval by referendum.

Although 73% of voters voted in favour of the changes, the result was invalidated by a turnout of just 14.98%.

== Background ==
When Lithuania joined the European Union in 2004, it agreed to allow the sale of land to foreigners. However, the country was granted a seven-year transition period, under which sale of land to foreigners remained illegal. This period was later extended to last until May 2014.

A previous referendum on allowing EU citizens to buy land was held in 1996. Although a majority of those voting voted in favour, the required quorum of 50% of registered voters voting in favour was not achieved.

The referendum was supported by the Lithuanian Nationalist Union and the Lithuanian Farmers and Greens Union.

It was opposed by the Social Democratic Party of Lithuania and the main opposition Homeland Union.

== Results ==
Choice	Votes	%	% of electorate
For	269,049	72.83	10.60
Against	100,375	27.17	3.95
Invalid/blank votes	10,754	–	
Total	380,178	100	
Registered voters/turnout	2,538,430	14.98	
Source: VRK
