= Darius Mockus =

Lithuanian entrepreneur (born 1965)

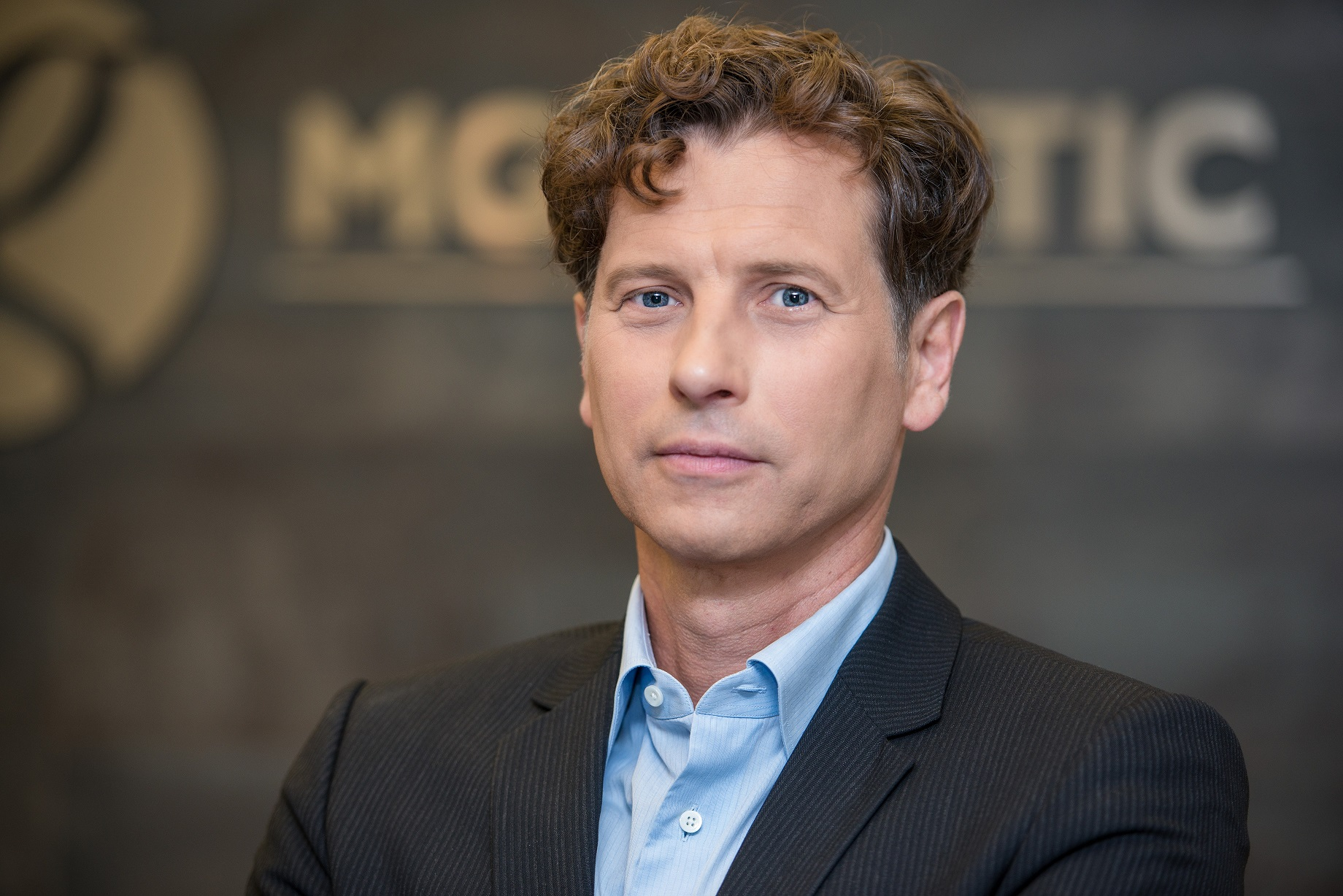
Darius Mockus

Darius Mockus (born 29 March 1965 in Vilnius) is a Lithuanian entrepreneur who is sole owner and President of business group MG grupė, UAB which is one of the largest groups in Lithuania, involved in production, sales, real estate, construction, IT and mass media industries.

== Biography ==
Mockus graduated Vilnius University (1988), Economics faculty. Since 2003, awards scholarships to the best students of the Faculty of Economics and Business Administration.

Mockus started his first entrepreneurship career in the late 80's running a cooperative "Litas". Later, throughout the 90's, his professional career accelerated further as with every year he gained experience of managing and administering new business units. Also, Mockus was one of the founders who established the Lithuanian Free Market Institute.

Mockus is a member of Vilnius Tennis Club and Honorary President of Lithuanian Tennis Union.

Leisure: travel, reading, history, active sports: tennis, basketball, skiing and snowboarding.

== Timeline ==
- 1990 – Executive Director at the National Commodity Exchange AB "Lietuvos birža" (Lithuanian Exchange).
- 1991–1992 – President of "Lietuvos investicija" (Lithuanian Investment).
- Since 1992 – Chairman of the Board of investment stock company "Investicijos fondas" (Investment Fund).
- Since 1996 – Director of JSC "Minvista".
- Since 2000 – Director of "MG Baltic" (previously "Minvista").
- Since 2002 – President of "MG Baltic".

In 2002 commission of experts in "Veidas" magazine recognised Darius Mockus as Manager of the Year in Lithuania.
