= Algirdas Paleckis =

Lithuanian politician and convicted spy

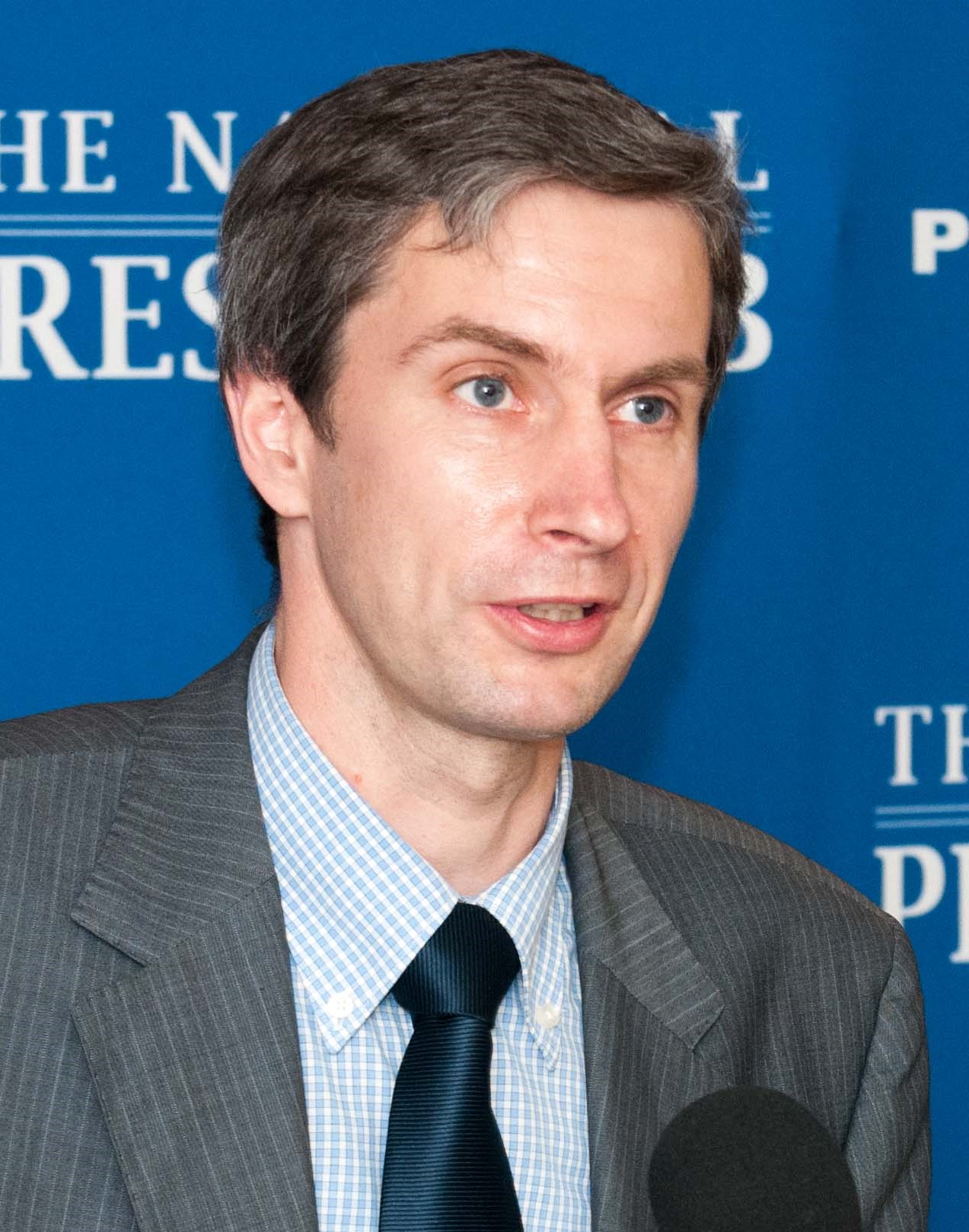
- Algirdas Paleckis at the National Press Club in 2012

Personal details
- Born: 20 May 1971 (age 55) Bern, Switzerland
- Spouse: Olga Paleckienė
- Education: Vilnius University

Algirdas Paleckis (born 20 May 1971) is a Lithuanian politician, former diplomat, and public figure.

== Biography ==
Algirdas Paleckis was born on 20 May 1971, in Bern, Switzerland, the son of Soviet diplomat Justas Vincas Paleckis. His grandfather was Justas Paleckis, a journalist and a foreign correspondent in the 1930s who later became a communist and the speaker of the Supreme Soviet of Lithuanian SSR following the Soviet occupation.

In 1994, Paleckis graduated from Vilnius University with a master's degree in journalism and international relations.

== Career ==
From 1997 to 2001, Paleckis was the 1st secretary at Lithuania's Permanent Mission to the EU in Brussels, becoming head of the West European Division at the Ministry of Foreign Affairs of Lithuania in 2001, a post in which he remained until 2003. From 15 November 2004 to 17 April 2007, he was a member of the Lithuanian Parliament. Later, Paleckis was an assemblyman of the Council of Europe from 24 January 2005 to 5 May 2007 and worked as a Vice-Mayor of Vilnius from 2007 to 2008. In 2008, he founded the Front Party and was its leader until November 2014.

In the 2018 report to the parliamentary committee, the State Security Department of Lithuania implied that during 2006—2008, Paleckis was supported by the business group MG Baltic, led by Darius Mockus, throughout his political career and maintained ties with the group even after the establishment of the Front Party in 2008.

He is fluent in Lithuanian, English, French, Russian, and German.

== Criminal prosecution ==
=== Denial of Soviet crimes against Lithuania ===
In 2011, Lithuanian authorities prosecuted Paleckis for his public denial of the Soviet aggression during the 1991 January Events in Lithuania. Paleckis claimed that he conducted a journalistic research and found several witnesses as well as ballistic assessments that indicated that there were Lithuanian government snipers on the roof near the Vilnius TV centre who were shooting civilians with hunting rifles. He stated that "it appears that in January 1991 our own people were shooting at their natives". In January 2012, 1st District Court of Vilnius City initially vindicated Paleckis, but following the appeal by the prosecution, the higher Vilnius Regional Court overturned the decision and Paleckis was sentenced to a fine of 10,400 litas (€3,100) on 12 June 2012. On 23 January 2013, the Supreme Court of Lithuania made a final decision upholding the conviction.

In January 2011, following the public statements by Algirdas Paleckis, his brother Rimvydas Paleckis publicly apologized to the relatives of the January Events victims. Rimvydas Paleckis, who actually worked as a journalist during 13 January 1991, said "I saw with my own eyes how people died near the [TV] tower" and described his brother's statements as "delusional". His father Justas Vincas Paleckis said he was "shocked" by his son's statements and said that lately they are finding less and less common ground.

=== Spying for Russia ===
Paleckis was arrested in 2018 on suspicion of spying for Russia. The Lithuanian authorities argued against granting bail on the grounds that Paleckis had lived in Moscow, had connections there, and could flee from the country. Paleckis was released on supervision in April 2020. On 27 July 2021, Šiauliai district court found Paleckis guilty of preparing to commit the crime of espionage and sentenced him to six years in prison. The conviction was upheld by the Lithuanian Court of Appeal on 6 May 2022. In June 2023, the Supreme Court of Lithuania made a final ruling confirming his sentence, although shortening it to 5 years and 6 months in prison.

=== Defamation case ===
In 2024, Paleckis was prosecuted for defamation of Lithuanian partisans and the former Minister of Defence Laurynas Kasčiūnas, whom he described as a Nazi. While in prison, he gave an interview in which he belittled Lithuanian resistance to the Soviet occupation and justified the Soviet Union, while also criticizing the role of the United States in the Russian invasion of Ukraine and the Lithuanian foreign policy. In November 2024, Kaunas District Court acquitted Paleckis of charges for defamation of Lithuanian partisans, but convicted him for defamation of Kasčiūnas. The court sentenced Paleckis to additional three months in prison.

== Political views ==
Paleckis is no longer affiliated with any political party. In 2008, he founded the far-left Front Party, which, after a merger with the Lithuanian Socialist Party, became Socialist People's Front. The party was never elected into the parliament. He left the party in 2016, citing differences with party leadership.

Paleckis is critical of Lithuanian capitalism, writing in 2018, "they promised us Sweden, but the banana republic came out. I will add: only instead of dictators – clowns."

=== Russia ===
On 15 March 2005, Paleckis worried that democracy was failing in Russia, stating, "Russia during this period lost its way a little because of the track and was a little tempted by authoritarian rule. They must be returned before it is too late."

== Electoral history ==
=== 2016 Lithuanian parliamentary election ===
Single-member constituency of Naujoji Vilnia Second round voting, 23 October 2016
Party	Candidate	Votes	%
TS–LKD	Monika Navickienė	7,401	53.21
Independent	Algirdas Paleckis	6,509	46.79
Total votes		13,910	100.00

== Awards and honors ==
In 2004, Paleckis was awarded the Knight of the Order for Merits to Lithuania. In 2013, following Paleckis' conviction, President Dalia Grybauskaitė formally stripped him of his award.

- France:
  - Knight of the Legion of Honour (2002)

== Works ==
- Ties Europos greitkeliu: Briuselio užrašai. Vilnius, 2001.
- Antrankiai minčiai ("Handcuffs for Mind"). Auth. Algirdas Paleckis. Vilnius, 2021. ISBN 978-609-475-702-0
