= List of political parties in Lithuania =

This article lists political parties in Lithuania. As of October 2026, there are 22 active political parties registered with the Ministry of Justice, and one party undergoing reorganization. Lithuania has a multi-party system in which no one party often has a chance of gaining power alone, and parties must work with each other to form coalition governments.

As of October 2026, Lithuania has a total of ▼95,462 people (53% female, 47% male) registered as party members and is experiencing a sharp decline in political congregation, with a ▼12.76% decrease from the start of public membership tracking in 2018. Distrust in political parties emerged as a major contributor to this, the institution's continued decline in opinion polling now ranks it as the least trusted, having overtaken the Seimas, with only a single digit percentage of representative population expressing confidence.

== Registered parties ==
By law, political parties are obligated to update their data at least biannually, specifically during the months of March and October, in order to maintain their active registration status.

=== Parties with parliamentary representation ===
There are currently nine parties represented in the Seimas. The current government is a broad majority coalition led by the Social Democratic Party of Lithuania, which also includes the Union of Democrats "For Lithuania", the Lithuanian Farmers and Greens Union, the Electoral Action of Poles in Lithuania – Christian Families Alliance. In 2025, the parliamentary group of the last two parties replaced the Union of Democrats "For Lithuania" during a government reshuffle, but the later then returned to governing swapping out the Political Party "Dawn of Nemunas", which was in government between 2024–26.

Name	Abbr.	Leader	Ideology	Political position	Seimas	MEPs	Memb.
Social Democratic Party of Lithuania; Lietuvos socialdemokratų partija	LSDP	Mindaugas Sinkevičius	Social democracy	Centre-left	51 / 141	2 / 11	13,012
Homeland Union – Lithuanian Christian Democrats; Tėvynės sąjunga – Lietuvos krikščionys demokratai	TS–LKD	Laurynas Kasčiūnas	Christian democracy; Liberal conservatism	Centre-right	28 / 141	3 / 11	10,884
Dawn of Nemunas; Nemuno aušra	PPNA	Remigijus Žemaitaitis	Right-wing populism; Anti-establishment	Social: Right-wing; Fiscal: Centre-left	17 / 141	—N/a	3,225
Union of Democrats "For Lithuania"; Demokratų sąjunga „Vardan Lietuvos“	DSVL	Virginijus Sinkevičius	Third Way; Green conservatism; Moderate conservatism	Centre to centre-left	13 / 141	1 / 11	3,801
Liberals' Movement; Liberalų sąjūdis	LS; LRLS	Viktorija Čmilytė-Nielsen	Classical liberalism; Conservative liberalism	Centre to centre-right	11 / 141	1 / 11	6,627
Lithuanian Farmers and Greens Union; Lietuvos valstiečių ir žaliųjų sąjunga	LVŽS	Aurelijus Veryga	Agrarianism; Cultural conservatism	Centre-left to left-wing	6 / 141	1 / 11	3,875
Electoral Action of Poles in Lithuania – Christian Families Alliance; Lietuvos lenkų rinkimų akcija – Krikščioniškų šeimų sąjunga Akcja Wyborcza Polaków na Litwie – Związek Chrześcijańskich Rodzin	LLRA–KŠS	Waldemar Tomaszewski	Christian democracy; Social conservatism; Polish minority interests	Centre-right to right-wing	3 / 141	1 / 11	2,023
People and Justice Union (Centrists, Nationalists); Tautos ir teisingumo sąjunga (centristai, tautininkai)	TTS	Rimas Jonas Jankūnas	Right-wing populism; National conservatism; Euroscepticism	Far-right	1 / 141	1 / 11	6,286
National Alliance; Nacionalinis susivienijimas	NS	Vytautas Sinica	Lithuanian nationalism	Far-right	1 / 141	0 / 11	2,237

=== Parties without parliamentary representation ===
Name	Abbr.	Leader	Ideology	Municipal councils (Note: Elected members)	MEPs	Memb.
Freedom Party; Laisvės partija	LP	Vytautas Mitalas	Social liberalism	13 / 1,498	1 / 11	2,949
Lithuanian Regions Party; Lietuvos regionų partija	LRP	Giedrė Pavasarytė	Regionalism; Conservative social democracy; Equity feminism	57 / 1,498	0 / 11	5,913
Centre-Right Union; Centro dešinės sąjunga	CDS	Petras Čimbaras (Interim)	Conservative liberalism	55 / 1,498	0 / 11	3,984
Labour Party; Darbo partija	DP	Gintaras Steponėnas	Populism	46 / 1,498	0 / 11	7,399
Lithuanian Green Party; Lietuvos žaliųjų partija	LŽP	Ieva Budraitė	Green liberalism	12 / 1,498	0 / 11	2,206
Lithuania - For Everyone; Lietuva - visų	PLV	Aleksandras Nemunaitis	Lithuanian diaspora interests	0 / 1,498	—N/a	3,916
Together with the Vytis; Kartu su Vyčiu	KsV	Vaclovas Fortunatas Žutautas	Welfare state nationalism; Soft Russophilia	—N/a		2,322
Movement for Forests - Young Lithuania; Sąjūdis už miškus - Jaunoji Lietuva	JL	Stanislovas Buškevičius	Right-wing populism; Lithuanian nationalism	0 / 1,498	0 / 11	2,231
Lithuanian People's Party; Lietuvos liaudies partija	LLP	Tauras Jakelaitis	Russophilia	—N/a	0 / 11	2,182
Centre of Trade Unions; Profesinių sąjungų centras	PSC	Kęstutis Juknis	Trade union interests	—N/a		2,161
Lithuanian Christian Democracy Party; Lietuvos krikščioniškosios demokratijos partija	LKDP	Kęstutis Juočeris Jr.	Christian democracy	—N/a	0 / 11	2,007
Samogitian Party; Žemaičių partija	ŽP	Petras Pareigis	Samogitian regionalism	0 / 1,498	0 / 11	2,000
Lithuanian List; Lietuvos sąrašas	PPLS	Darius Kuolys	Anti-establishment	—N/a		1,974

== Inactive parties ==
As of 2026, one political party is undergoing merger and has not submitted the necessary documents to be registered for the upcoming elections.

Name	Abbr.	Leader	Ideology	Municipal councils	MEPs	Memb.
Christian Union; Krikščionių sąjunga	KS	Rimantas Jonas Dagys	Christian democracy; Christian social policy	8 / 1,498	0 / 11	2,238

== Defunct and unregistered parties ==
- Civic Democratic Party (Pilietinės demokratijos partija)
- Centre Union of Lithuania (Lietuvos centro sąjunga)
- Christian Democratic Union (Krikščionių demokratų sąjunga)
- Christian Conservative Social Union (Krikščionių konservatorių socialinė sąjunga)
- Dawn of Justice (Teisingumo Aušra)
- Democratic Labour Party of Lithuania (Lietuvos demokratinė darbo partija)
- Front (Frontas)
- Labourist Party (Leiboristų partija)
- Liberal and Centre Union (Lietuvos liberalų ir centro sąjunga)
- Liberal Union of Lithuania (Lietuvos liberalų sąjunga)
- Life Logic Party of Lithuania (Lietuvos gyvenimo logikos partija)
- Lithuanian Christian Democrats (Lietuvos krikščionys demokratai)
- Lithuanian Freedom Union (Liberals) (Lietuvos Laisvės Sąjunga (Liberalai))
- Lithuanian Nationalist and Republican Union (Lietuvių tautininkų ir respublikonų sąjunga)
- Lithuanian Union of Political Prisoners and Deportees (Lietuvos politinių kalinių ir tremtinių sąjunga)
- Lithuanian Political Prisoners Party (Lietuvos politinių kalinių partija)
- Lithuanian Party of the Economy (Lietuvos ūkio partija)
- Lithuanian Peasants Party (Lietuvos valstiečių partija)
- Lithuanian People's Party (Lietuvos žmonių partija)
- Modern Christian-Democratic Union (Moderniųjų krikščionių demokratų sąjunga)
- National Resurrection Party (Tautos prisikėlimo partija)
- New Democracy Party (Naujosios demokratijos partija)
- New Union (Social Liberals) (Naujoji Sąjunga (Socialliberalai))
- Order and Justice (Tvarka ir teisingumas)
- Party of Bread Eaters (Duonos valgytojų partija)
- Republican League (Respublikonų lyga, Polish: Liga Republikańska)
- Russian Alliance (Rusų aljansas)
- Socialist Party of Lithuania (Lietuvos socialistų partija)
- Socialist People's Front (Socialistinis liaudies frontas)
- The Way of Courage (Drąsos kelias)
- Union for National Unity (Tautos vienybės sąjunga)
- Union of the Fighters for Lithuania (Kovotojų už Lietuvą sąjunga)

== Historical parties ==
- Lithuanian Democratic Party
- Lithuanian Popular Socialist Democratic Party
- Peasant Union
- Lithuanian Christian Democratic Party
- Democratic National Freedom League
- Farmers Party
- Communist Party of Lithuania

== Membership by Municipality ==
As of October 2026, the following political parties had the largest memberships in the specific Municipalities.

Bolded parties have the most membership from the municipality. For the merged across entries there are also no other parties within 90% of its number, and they are also the national leader for the concentration of that locality members amongst all the parties.

Members of the local election committees are not included in the comparisons.

Party with the most members by municipality
Municipality	Total		Share
Municipality	Most	≥90%	Share
{{{0}}}
City Municipalities
Alytus City	TS–LKD	1: Social Democratic Party	KsV
Kaunas City	PLV	—N/a	JL
Klaipėda City	TTS	—N/a	ŽP
Neringa	LS		
Palanga City	TS–LKD	—N/a	ŽP
Panevėžys City	TTS	1: Homeland Union – Lithuanian Christian Democrats	KsV
Šiauliai City	LSDP	1: Lithuanian Regions Party	LKDP
Vilnius City	TS–LKD	—N/a	LP
Visaginas	TTS	—N/a	LLP
District Municipalities
Akmenė District	LSDP		
Alytus District	TS–LKD		
Anykščiai District	DP	1: Homeland Union – Lithuanian Christian Democrats	**DP**
Birštonas	LSDP		
Biržai District	LVŽS		
Druskininkai District	TS–LKD	2: Labour; Union of Democrats "For Lithuania"	DSVL
Elektrėnai District	LS		
Ignalina District	LSDP	3: Labour; Liberals' Movement; Lithuanian Farmers and Greens Union	LVŽS
Jonava District	LSDP	—N/a	PSC
Joniškis District	LS	1: Social Democratic Party	**LS**
Jurbarkas District	LRP		
Kaišiadorys District	DP	—N/a	PLV
Kalvarija District	LS	3: Labour; Union of Democrats "For Lithuania"; Lithuanian Farmers and Greens Union	DSVL
Kaunas District	LSDP	1: Lithuania – For Everyone	PSC
Kazlų Rūda District	TS–LKD	—N/a	LKDP
Kėdainiai District	DP	—N/a	PLV
Kelmė District	LSDP	1: Dawn of Nemunas	PPNA
Klaipėda District	ŽP	1: People and Justice Union (Centrists, Nationalists)	**ŽP**
Kretinga District	ŽP		
Kupiškis District	LSDP	—N/a	KS
Lazdijai District	DSVL	1: Homeland Union – Lithuanian Christian Democrats	**DSVL**
Marijampolė	LSDP	—N/a	LKDP
Mažeikiai District	LSDP	—N/a	LLP
Molėtai District	TS–LKD	1: Lithuanian Regions Party	LRP
Pagėgiai District	LS		
Pakruojis District	LSDP	1: Lithuanian Regions Party	LRP
Panevėžys District	LSDP	—N/a	KS
Pasvalys District	LSDP	1: Homeland Union – Lithuanian Christian Democrats	LRP
Plungė District	ŽP	1: Homeland Union – Lithuanian Christian Democrats	**ŽP**
Prienai District	LSDP	—N/a	LVŽS
Radviliškis District	TS–LKD		
Raseiniai District	DP		
Rietavas District	DP	2: Homeland Union – Lithuanian Christian Democrats; Liberals' Movement	**DP**
Rokiškis District	LSDP		
Skuodas District	LSDP	—N/a	ŽP
Šakiai District	LSDP	—N/a	KsV
Šalčininkai District	LLRA–KŠS		
Šiauliai District	LSDP	—N/a	ŽP
Šilalė District	TS–LKD	1: Dawn of Nemunas	PPNA
Šilutė District	DSVL	2: Lithuanian Regions Party; Social Democratic Party	**DSVL**
Širvintos District	DP		
Švenčionys District	TS–LKD	—N/a	LLP
Tauragė District	LSDP	—N/a	ŽP
Telšiai District	LSDP	—N/a	ŽP
Trakai District	LS	—N/a	LLRA–KŠS
Ukmergė District	DP		
Utena District	LSDP	—N/a	PPLS
Varėna District	TS–LKD	—N/a	CDS
Vilkaviškis District	LSDP		
Vilnius District	LLRA–KŠS		
Zarasai District	DP		

== See also ==
- Politics of Lithuania
- List of political parties by country
- Liberalism in Lithuania
