= Romualdas Ozolas =

Lithuanian politician (1939–2015)

Professor Romualdas Ozolas
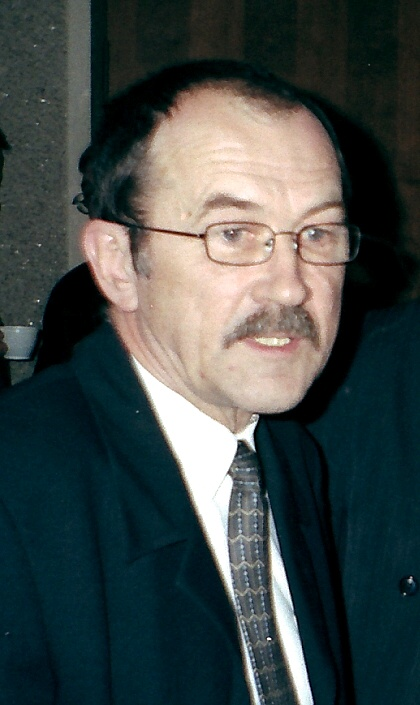

Deputy Prime Minister of the Republic of Lithuania
- In office 17 March 1990 – 10 January 1991

Member of the Seimas
- In office 25 November 1991 – 18 October 2000
- Preceded by: Česlovas Juršėnas
- Succeeded by: Artūras Paulauskas

Personal details
- Born: 31 January 1939 Joniškėlis, Lithuania
- Died: 6 April 2015 (aged 76) Vilnius, Lithuania
- Party: Sąjūdis (1988–1990); Lithuanian Centre Union (1992–2003); Lithuanian Centre Party (2003–2015)
- Spouse: Irena Ozolienė
- Education: Vilnius University (1962)

Romualdas Ozolas [rɔmʊˈɐɫdɐs ˈoːzɔɫɐs] (31 January 1939 – 6 April 2015) was a Lithuanian politician, activist, writer and pedagogue who taught at Vilnius University. He was of Latvian descent on his father's side.

He was a winner of the Stasys Šalkauskis Prize.

== Political career ==
=== Member of the Lithuanian Communist Party: 1973–1990 ===
Ozolas became a member of the Lithuanian Communist Party of the Soviet Union at the age of 34, a decision his close ones would deem as betrayal while he later on would recall as one of his greatest downfalls in his life. When recalling his years as the member of the Communist Party of Lithuania, Ozolas said: "After a long while of hesitation, I have made up my mind to see "what makes socialism". After a few years it was absolutely clear. It took me two more years until I left. However, I have faced the Perestroika of Mikhail Gorbachev, thus finding out its being as well as its mode of life. I only needed to take a look around, to see from which side I should make an approach."

=== Member of Sąjūdis: 1988–1990 ===
Ozolas had a clear vision for Lithuania: That it would be an independent state and a free nation from the very start. According to the political commentator A. Ramonaitė, during the primary stages of Sąjūdis—the Reform Movement for Lithuania—Ozolas had been a key member, the glue who bound everything together. He was well-known, had ties with various discussion groups, and had a well-grounded political vision. To quote his companion Arvydas Juozaitis, "We were all gathering under the flag of Ozolas who worked for the publishing office Thought at the time. I had participated in the discussions at his flat since 1982. I knew him very well. It was he who began talking about the necessity of creating, gathering into a movement for the independence."

=== Member of Lithuanian and Soviet parliaments: 1989–2000 ===
In February Ozolas was elected to the Supreme Soviet of Lithuanian SSR and served as its deputy for several weeks. In 1989 Soviet Union legislative election Ozolas was elected People's deputy with support of Sąjūdis. He would remain as a People's deputy until Spring of 1990. He was elected to Supreme Soviet of Lithuanian SSR once again in February 1990.

From 1990 to 1991 he served as Deputy Prime Minister of Lithuania together with Algirdas Brazauskas in Prunskienė Cabinet.

In 1992, he was elected to the Seimas and served until 2000, when Lithuanian Centre lost almost all its representatives in Seimas after 2000 Lithuanian parliamentary election.

From 2003 to 2007 Ozolas served as a councillor in Varėna district.

He and his supporters formed the Lithuanian Centre Movement in 1992 (it would become political party, the Lithuanian Centre Union, in 1993) and was its chairman until 2000. From 2003 to 2007 he chaired the National Centre Party (NCP), since renamed the Lithuanian Centre Party (LCP) in 2005.

== Political views ==
Ozolas was against Lithuania's membership in the European Union as he believed this was incompatible with the country's vision of independence. According to Darius Kuolys, "R. Ozolas was a consistent supporter of the country's unlimited freedom all the way who had a hard time surviving the partial loss of Lithuania's independence within the European Union. He understood this as a strong restraint of Lithuania's sovereignty." He was also against the idea of Lithuania joining the eurozone. In 2013, during an interview he had noted the differences between the original vision of Sąjūdis and the present situation, saying: "Back then [in the 1990s] we had different values. Back then we were heading towards an independent national country. Today we are once more integrating into an international union. As a consequence, it is self-evident that the values of the state have to be reshaped and that is exactly what was being done during the process of Lithuania becoming a member of the EU."

== Works ==
- Stories about Philosophers and Philosophy (1988)
- The First Years of Re-established Independence (1992)
- Within the Sources of Rebirth (1996)
