= Lithuanian Party of the Economy =

Political party in Lithuania (1995–2011)

Lithuanian Party of the Economy Lietuvos ūkio partija
- Leader: Klemensas Šeputis
- Founded: October 14, 1995
- Dissolved: September 26, 2011
- Merged into: New Union (Social Liberals)
- Headquarters: Savanorių pr. 7, Vilnius
- Ideology: Business interests Economic reform Economic nationalism

The Lithuanian Party of the Economy (Lithuanian: Lietuvos ūkio partija) was a minor political party in Lithuania founded in 1995, largely at the initiative of the Lithuanian business community. After winning no seats in the 1996 Lithuanian parliamentary election and only five seats in the 1997 municipal elections, it ceased activity. The party disbanded in 2011.

== History ==
The party was founded on 14 October 1995. Its chairman, Klemensas Šeputis, was the vice-chairman of the Lithuanian Confederation of Industrialists (Lithuanian: Lietuvos pramonininkų konfederacija), the largest business professional association in Lithuania, and an advisor to Minister of Economy Albertas Šimėnas in 1992, before his resignation due to conflict over economic policy. Among the party's founders and candidates in the 1996 parliamentary election were Aleksas Bružas, chairman of the Lithuanian Education Employees' Trade Union, Juozas Gaidamavičius, vice-president of business conglomerate "Vikonda", Alfredas Pekeliūnas, chairman of the pork producer Krekenavos Agrofirma and the Lithuanian Pig Growers' Association, Romualdas Rudzys, and other members of the Lithuanian business community.

It received 1.20% of the vote in the 1996 parliamentary election and did not win a single seat. In the 1997 local elections, it won five seats in municipal councils, out of a total of 1,473 throughout the country. It did not contest any elections afterwards. In 2011, the party was liquidated.

== Program ==
The party's main concerns were economic reforms and creating a more rational and independent economic system. It supported establishing a long-term foreign trade strategy geared towards expansion of exports, granting priority to local businesses in government procurement, mandating that at least 50 percent of external debt should be spent on development of local industry, merging ministries and reducing their number of employees, and establishing an import monopoly for petroleum products, alcohol and tobacco products. It proposed turning Lithuania into a presidential republic, reducing the number of Seimas members and establishing a jury system. Some political scientists have described it as a "social democratic" party.
