= Lithuanian Centre Union =

Liberal political party in Lithuania (1993–2003)

Lithuanian Centre Union Lietuvos centro sąjunga
- Founded: 1990
- Dissolved: 2003
- Split from: Sąjūdis
- Merged into: Liberal and Centre Union
- Succeeded by: Lithuanian Centre Party
- Ideology: Agrarianism
- Political position: Centre-right

The Lithuanian Centre Union, or Centre Union of Lithuania (Lithuanian: Lietuvos centro sąjunga, LCS), was a liberal political party in Lithuania that existed between 1993 and 2003.

== History ==
It was established by the centre-fraction in Sąjūdis in 1990 as the Lithuanian Centre Movement. In 1992 parliamentary election the movement failed to pass 4 per cent threshold and won only two seats. In 1993, the movement was reorganised to party. In 1995 municipal elections the party entered many municipal councils and joined coalition with the Homeland Union and the Lithuanian Christian Democratic Party.

In the 1996 parliamentary election the party won 8.67 per cent of the votes and 14 seats. It signed agreement of confidence and supply with the Homeland Union and the Lithuanian Christian Democratic Party. in 1997 presidential election the Centre Union supported Valdas Adamkus, who won election.

In the spring of 2000, the Centre Union joined informal alliance between the New Union (Social Liberals), the Liberal Union of Lithuania and the Modern Christian-Democratic Union (known as the New Politics Coalition). In 2000, parliamentary election the party won 2.86 per cent of the votes and two seats. Coalition as a whole failed to win majority of the seats in Seimas and relied from the support of Lithuanian Peasants Party and Young Lithuania. The coalition lasted only eight months.

In 2003, the party joined forces with the Liberal Union of Lithuania and the Modern Christian-Democratic Union to form the Liberal and Centre Union.

== Leaders ==
- Romualdas Ozolas (1993−2000)
- Kęstutis Glaveckas (2000−2003)

== Election results ==
Election	Votes (Note: Proportional representation votes.)	%	Seats	+/–	Government
1992	46,910	2.52 (#6)	2 / 141	New	Opposition
1996	113,333	8.67 (#4)	13 / 141	▲11	Coalition (1996–1999)
1996	113,333	8.67 (#4)	13 / 141	▲11	Opposition (1999-2000)
2000	42,030	2.86 (#7)	2 / 141	▼11	Coalition (2000–2001)
2000	42,030	2.86 (#7)	2 / 141	▼11	Opposition (2001–2003)
