= Plečkaitis =

- Lithuanian surname
- m.: Plečkaitis
- f.: (unmarried): Plečkaitytė
- f.: (married): Plečkaitienė

Plečkaitis is a Lithuanian surname. Notable people with the surname include:

- Jeronimas Plečkaitis (1887–1963), Lithuanian teacher and politician
- Joe Pleckaitis, Canadian ice-hockey player
- Romanas Plečkaitis, Lithuanian philosopher
- Vidmantas Plečkaitis, Lithuanian artist and politician
