= Aidas Gedvilas =

Lithuanian politician (born 1966)

Member of the Seimas
- Incumbent
- Assumed office 13 November 2020
- In office 12 November 2004 – 11 January 2005

Personal details
- Born: 9 June 1966 (age 59)
- Party: Dawn of Nemunas (since 2024); Labour Party (until 2022)

Aidas Gedvilas (born 9 June 1966) is a Lithuanian politician of the Dawn of Nemunas. He has been a member of the Seimas since 2020, having previously served from 2004 to 2005. He was a member of the Labour Party until 2022, and joined the Dawn of Nemunas in 2024.
