= 1996 Lithuanian parliamentary election =

- 20 October 1996 (first round); 10 November 1996 (second round)
- All 141 seats in the Seimas; 71 seats needed for a majority
- Turnout: 52.92% ▼
Party	Leader	Vote %	Seats	+/–
TS	Vytautas Landsbergis	31.34	70	New
LKDP	Algirdas Saudargas	10.43	16	+6
LDDP	Česlovas Juršėnas	10.01	12	−61
LCS	Romualdas Ozolas	8.67	14	+12
LSDP	Aloyzas Sakalas	6.94	12	+4
JL	Stanislovas Buškevičius	4.01	1	+1
LMP	Kazimira Prunskienė	3.86	1	New
KDS	Kazys Bobelis	3.24	1	0
LLRA	Jan Sienkiewicz	3.13	3	−1
LPA	Mečislovas Vaškovič	2.55	1	New
LTS–LDP	R. Smetona & S. Pečeliūnas	2.20	3	−1
LLS	Ginutis Vencius	1.93	1	+1
LVP	Albinas Vaižmužis	1.75	1	New
LPKTS	Audrius Butkevičius	1.57	1	−1
Independents	–	–	4	+3
This lists parties that won seats. See the complete results below.
Prime Minister before	Prime Minister after
Laurynas Stankevičius; LDDP	Gediminas Vagnorius; TS

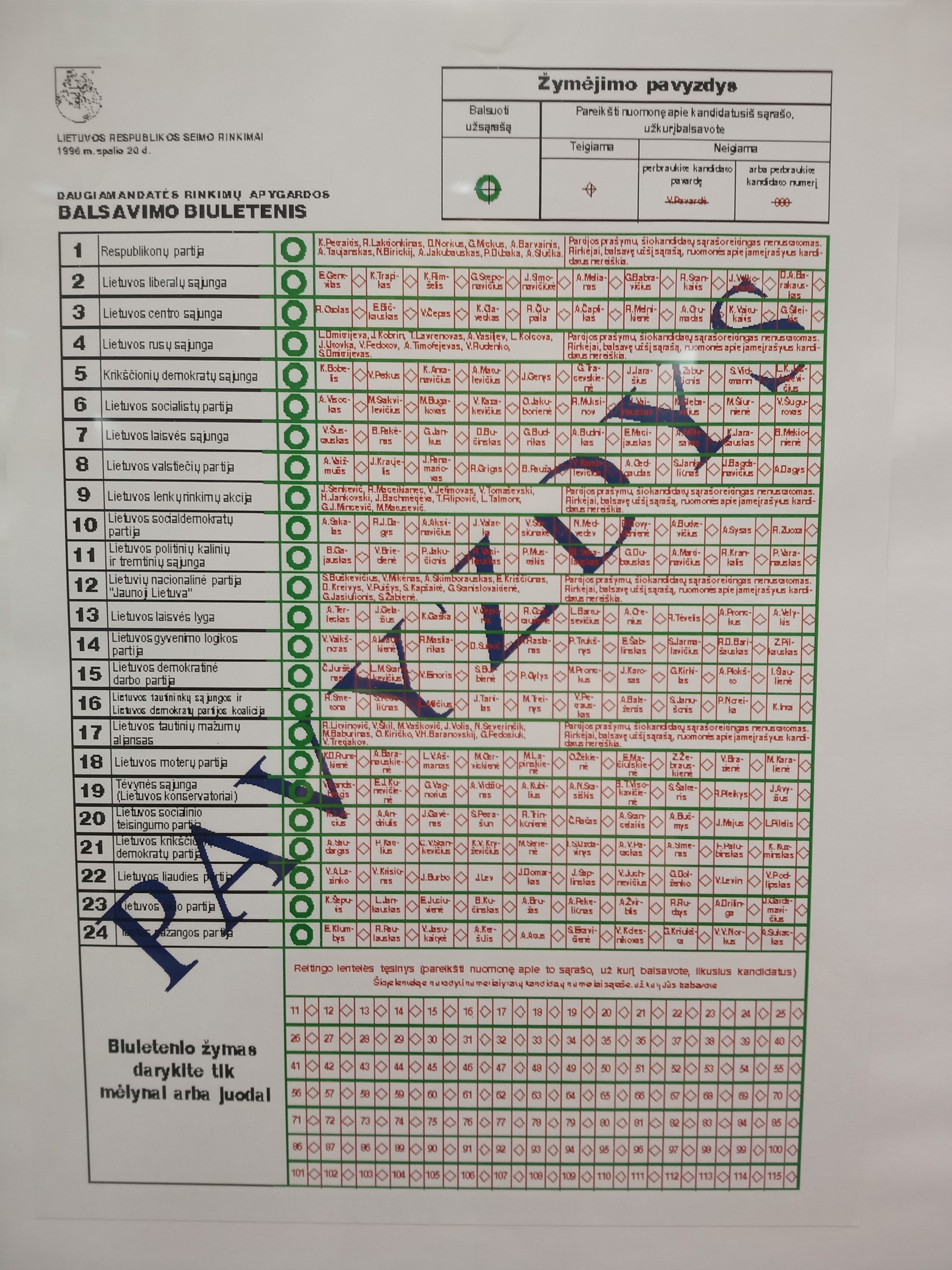
Ballot paper

Parliamentary elections were held in Lithuania in two stages on 20 October and 10 November 1996. All 141 seats in the Seimas were up for election; 70 based on proportional party lists and 71 in single member constituencies. Where no candidate gained more than 50% of the vote on 20 October, a run-off was held on 10 November.

The first round of the elections was held concurrently with a referendum to amend Articles 55, 57 and 131 of the constitution, and a referendum on the use of proceeds from privatization. The second round was held concurrently with a referendum to amend Article 47 of the constitution. Due to a low turnout, none of the referendum questions succeeded in getting approval from at least 50% of registered voters.

The result was a victory for the Homeland Union – Lithuanian Conservatives, which won 70 seats. They formed a coalition with second-place Lithuanian Christian Democratic Party. The Homeland Union benefited from dissatisfaction with the ruling Democratic Labour Party of Lithuania, which had failed to reignite the economy and was plagued by financial scandals. Gediminas Vagnorius was subsequently appointed as the Prime Minister.

== Electoral system ==
In his decree on 9 April 1996, the President of Lithuania Algirdas Brazauskas set the date of the elections to the Seimas for 20 October. Elections took place under a mixed electoral system, with 70 MPs elected on proportional party lists and 71 MPs in single member constituencies. Run-off elections were to be held on 10 November in constituencies where no candidate received at least 50% of the votes cast.

In June 1994, Political Parties' and Political Organisations' Act was passed. This act set a notion that only political parties (and coalitions consisting them) could take part in the elections. Public organisations (e. g. Association of Poles in Lithuania) had to become political parties if it wanted to part in the elections.

In June 1996, the electoral threshold for the 70 proportional seats was increased from 4% to 5%, a new threshold of 7% was introduced for electoral coalitions and the exception for electoral lists of national minorities was eliminated. This change was mainly passed by the votes of the Democratic Labour Party of Lithuania and the Homeland Union. The combined purpose of the changes was to reduce the number of small parties in the parliament.

The elections were also the first to allow voters to give preference votes to candidates on electoral lists, although their influence was limited (as some parties hadn't allowed this option for their lists). This system allowed voters to cast both positive and negative preference votes (the latter option allowed to express disapproval of candidates). Similar preference votes' system is used for Latvian parliamentary elections.

== Campaign ==
The main contestants in the elections were the ruling Democratic Labour Party of Lithuania (LDDP) and the Homeland Union - Lithuanian Conservatives. The LDDP, led by Česlovas Juršėnas, had evolved from the Communist Party of Lithuania and won the 1992 election to the Seimas by a significant margin. Homeland Union, led by Vytautas Landsbergis, was founded in 1993 from elements of the Sąjūdis party, which started as a reform movement that had led the drive for independence from the Soviet Union.

Pre-election polls suggested a victory for the right-wing opposition over LDDP. The ruling party was suffering as a result of continued economic woes that were at the forefront of the debate: the economic situation was not improving as quickly as people expected. Financial scandals, including one involving former Prime Minister Adolfas Šleževičius, also played a major role. The opposition, on the other hand, promised improvement and stability on the domestic scene and a fight against corruption. Homeland Union secured the support of major business leaders before the election: in October 1996 Gediminas Vagnorius and Bronislovas Lubys, the leader of Lithuanian Confederation of Industrialists signed a memorandum, creating an alliance of politics and industry. Homeland Union also received support and financial contributions from international companies and Lithuanian diaspora. All major parties generally agreed on foreign policy goals of affiliation with NATO and European institutions.

Altogether 1,351 candidates representing 28 political parties contested for the 141 seats at stake, while 24 parties competed for the proportionally allocated seats.

== Opinion polls ==
View source data.

== Results ==
In the elections characterized by a substantially lower turnout than before, Homeland Union gained 70 seats. It came just one seat short of absolute majority in parliament. Lithuanian Christian Democratic Party finished as a distant runner-up with 16 seats. The ruling LDDP won only 12 seats, compared to 73 in the previous elections.

The votes in the election were more dispersed than before. This, together with the changes to the electoral law increasing the threshold for nationwide constituency, had the effect of increasing the wasted votes in the constituency from 14% in elections of 1992 to 32% in 1996. It is the biggest share of wasted votes in Seimas election's history up to date.

Party	Nationwide			Constituency (first round)			Constituency (second round)			Total seats	+/–
Party	Votes	%	Seats	Votes	%	Seats	Votes	%	Seats	Total seats	+/–
Homeland Union – Lithuanian Conservatives	409,585	31.34	33	376,081	28.65	2	407,645	42.40	35	70	New
Lithuanian Christian Democratic Party	136,259	10.43	11	173,761	13.24	0	138,309	14.39	5	16	+6
Democratic Labour Party of Lithuania	130,837	10.01	10	146,006	11.12	0	105,103	10.93	2	12	–54
Lithuanian Centre Union	113,333	8.67	9	89,452	6.81	0	52,878	5.50	4	13	+11
Social Democratic Party of Lithuania	90,756	6.94	7	95,499	7.28	0	52,058	5.41	5	12	+4
Young Lithuania	52,423	4.01	0	22,052	1.68	0	13,845	1.44	1	1	+1
Lithuanian Women's Party	50,494	3.86	0	36,453	2.78	0	8,960	0.93	1	1	+1
Christian Democratic Union	42,346	3.24	0	20,711	1.58	0	8,702	0.91	1	1	0
Electoral Action of Poles in Lithuania	40,941	3.13	0	36,434	2.78	0	15,216	1.58	1	1	New
Alliance of the Lithuanian National Minorities	33,389	2.55	0	22,252	1.70	0	18,378	1.91	0	0	0
Lithuanian Nationalist Union	28,744	2.20	0	33,712	2.57	0	32,628	3.39	1	1	–3
Lithuanian Democratic Party	28,744	2.20	0	16,096	1.23	0	16,154	1.68	2	2	–2
Liberal Union of Lithuania	25,279	1.93	0	34,842	2.65	0	15,989	1.66	1	1	+1
Lithuanian Peasants Party	22,826	1.75	0	29,135	2.22	0	10,377	1.08	1	1	0
Lithuanian Russian Union	22,395	1.71	0	11,437	0.87	0				0	New
Lithuanian Union of Political Prisoners and Deportees	20,580	1.57	0	24,797	1.89	0	8,685	0.90	1	1	–4
Lithuanian Liberty Union	20,511	1.57	0	12,456	0.95	0	6,823	0.71	0	0	0
Lithuanian Party of the Economy	16,475	1.26	0	26,609	2.03	0	6,665	0.69	0	0	New
Lithuanian Liberty League	12,562	0.96	0	6,557	0.50	0				0	0
Lithuanian Social Justice Union	12,234	0.94	0	6,555	0.50	0				0	0
Socialist Party of Lithuania	9,985	0.76	0	5,820	0.44	0				0	New
Republican Party	5,063	0.39	0	12,153	0.93	0				0	0
Party of National Progress	3,922	0.30	0	6,392	0.49	0				0	0
Life Logic Party of Lithuania	3,361	0.26	0	4,071	0.31	0				0	New
Lithuanian Peoples Party	2,622	0.20	0	2,088	0.16	0				0	New
Non-Partisan Movement "Elections 96"				12,369	0.94	0				0	New
Independence Party				1,884	0.14	0				0	0
Lithuanian Reform Party				1,389	0.11	0				0	0
Independents				45,595	3.47	0	42,969	4.47	4	4	+3
Vacant									4	4	–
Total	1,306,922	100.00	70	1,312,658	100.00	2	961,384	100.00	69	141	0
Valid votes	1,306,922	95.07		1,312,658	95.49		961,384	95.82			
Invalid/blank votes	67,751	4.93		62,015	4.51		41,897	4.18			
Total votes	1,374,673	100.00		1,374,673	100.00		1,003,281	100.00			
Registered voters/turnout	2,597,530	52.92					2,401,542	41.78			

Four seats were left vacant and new elections were to be held in four constituencies where the turnout did not reach the required 40%. Two of these seats were won by Electoral Action of Poles in Lithuania (Vilniaus Šalčininkų and Vilniaus Trakų constituencies), one by Centre Union of Lithuania (Trakų constituency), and the last one by Alliance of the Lithuanian National Minorities (Naujosios Vilnios constituency).

== Aftermath ==
The newly elected Seventh Seimas elected Vytautas Landsbergis as its Speaker. As Homeland Union was one seat short of the majority, they were joined by the Christian Democrats in a coalition government. Gediminas Vagnorius of the Homeland Union was appointed the Prime Minister, while the leader of the Christian Democrats, Algirdas Saudargas was appointed the Minister of Foreign Affairs. Two members of the Centre Union of Lithuania, Algis Čaplikas and Imantas Lazdinis, joined the Government, but as individuals and not delegates of their party. Vincas Babilius of the Lithuanian Confederation of Industrialists became the Minister of Economy.

The newly formed coalition had supermajority in the parliament, what allowed it to amend the Constitution and overturn presidential vetoes.

These election marked the first time, when liberal party members were elected to the parliament of Lithuania.
