= Daiva Žebelienė =

Lithuanian politician (born 1968)

Member of the Seimas
- Incumbent
- Assumed office 14 November 2024
- Preceded by: Zigmantas Balčytis
- Constituency: Šilutė

Deputy Speaker of the Seimas
- Incumbent
- Assumed office 9 April 2025
- President: Saulius Skvernelis; Juozas Olekas

Mayor of the Šilutė District
- In office 2012–2013
- Preceded by: Virgilijus Pozingis
- Succeeded by: Šarūnas Laužikas

Member of the Šilutė District City Council
- In office 2011–2021

Personal details
- Born: 15 September 1968 (age 58) Šilutė, Lithuanian SSR
- Party: PPNA (since 2023)
- Other political affiliations: TT (2009–2013); LSDP (2013–2023)
- Spouse: Romualdas Žebelienė
- Children: 3
- Education: Vilnius University Šiauliai Academy
- Occupation: Teacher • Politician

Daiva Žebelienė (born 15 September 1968) is a Lithuanian politician of the Dawn of Nemunas serving as a member of the Seimas since 2024. From 2012 to 2013, she served as mayor of Šilutė.
