= 2000 Lithuanian parliamentary election =

- 8 October 2000
- All 141 seats in the Seimas; 71 seats needed for a majority
- Turnout: 58.63% ▲5.71 pp
| Party | Leader | Vote % | Seats | +/– |
|---|---|---|---|---|
| SDK (Note: Social-Democratic Coalition of Algirdas Brazauskas, coalition between LDDP, LSDP, LRS and NDP) | Algirdas Brazauskas | 31.08 | 51 | +26 |
| NS | Artūras Paulauskas | 19.64 | 29 | New |
| LLS | Rolandas Paksas | 17.25 | 34 | +33 |
| TS | Vytautas Landsbergis | 8.62 | 9 | −61 |
| KDS | Kazys Bobelis | 4.19 | 1 | 0 |
| LVP | Ramūnas Karbauskis | 4.08 | 4 | +3 |
| LKDP | Zigmas Zinkevičius | 3.07 | 2 | −14 |
| LCS | Romualdas Ozolas | 2.86 | 2 | −12 |
| NKS | Gediminas Vagnorius | 2.01 | 1 | New |
| LLRA | Valdemar Tomaševski | 1.95 | 2 | +1 |
| LLS | Vytautas Šustauskas | 1.27 | 1 | +1 |
| JL | Stanislovas Buškevičius | 1.15 | 1 | 0 |
| MKD | Vytautas Bogušis | – | 1 | New |
| Independents | – | – | 3 | −1 |
This lists parties that won seats. See the complete results below.
| Prime Minister before | Prime Minister after |
|---|---|
| Andrius Kubilius; TS | Rolandas Paksas; LLS |

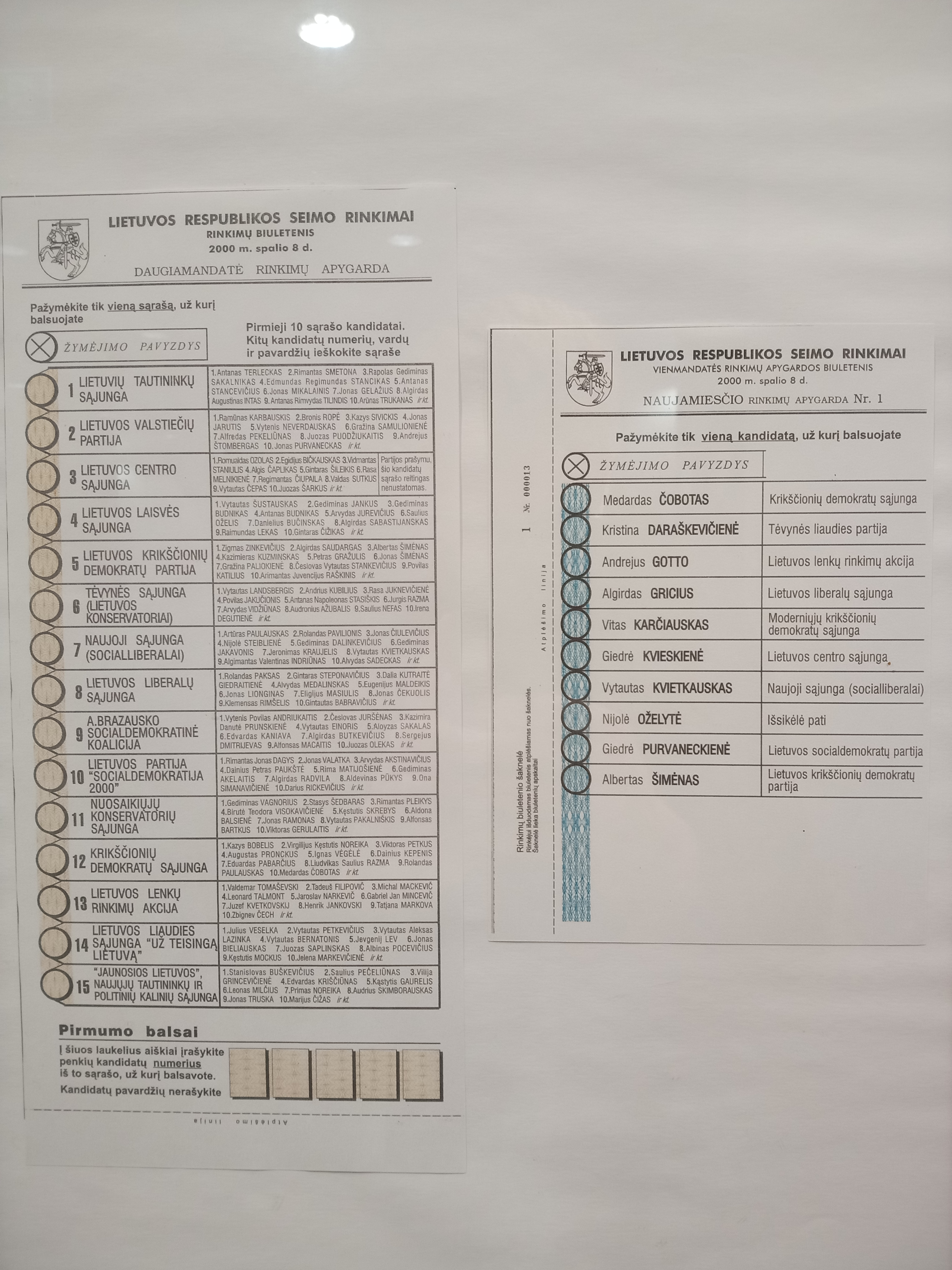
Ballot papers for nationwide proportional (left) and single mandate constituency (right) voting

Parliamentary elections were held in Lithuania on 8 October 2000. All 141 seats in the Seimas were up for election, 71 of them in single-seat constituencies based on first-past-the-post voting; the remaining 70, in a nationwide constituency based on proportional representation. Altogether, around 700 candidates competed in the single-seat constituencies, while over 1,100 candidates were included in the electoral lists for the nationwide constituency.

== Background ==
In 1996 Lithuanian parliamentary election the Homeland Union – Lithuanian Conservatives won 70 seats. They formed a coalition with second-place Lithuanian Christian Democratic Party. By 1998 Lithuania was hit by the Russian financial crisis, which (along with the conflicts between ruling coalition, Prime Ministers Gediminas Vagnorius and Rolandas Paksas and President of Republic Valdas Adamkus) caused two replacements of government.

Economic turmoil caused decline of support of main parties (the Homeland Union and the Democratic Labour Party of Lithuania). The other parties that benefited from aforementioned parties were the Liberal Union of Lithuania (especially after Paksas became its leader) and the New Union (Social Liberals). In municipal elections of 2000, these two parties combined won 30.67 per cent of the vote, while the Homeland Union and the Democratic Labour Party of Lithuania together won 17.74 per cent of the votes.

As response to this situation, the Democratic Labour Party of Lithuania, the Social Democratic Party of Lithuania and the New Democracy Party formed electoral coalition in July 2000 with Algirdas Mykolas Brazauskas as its candidate to the Prime Minister. The Homeland Union formed alliance with the Political Prisoners and Deportees Union of Lithuania.

== Electoral system ==
The 141 members of the Seimas were elected by parallel voting; 70 were elected by proportional representation in a single nationwide constituency, with 71 elected by first-past-the-post voting in single-member constituencies. Previously members from the single-member constituencies had been elected using the two-round system, but the electoral system was changed prior to the elections to scrap the second round and allow members to be elected by plurality. These changes had been introduced by the Homeland Union and passed by the Seimas on 19 July 2000. Although President Valdas Adamkus vetoed the Act, the veto was overturned and the changes had been implemented.

== Opinion polls ==
View source data.

== Results ==
Only four party and coalition lists passed five per cent threshold. The Social Democratic coalition of former President Algirdas Brazauskas received the largest share of the popular vote in the nationwide constituency (31 per cent) and won the most seats in the Seimas (51 seats), but short of the 71 seats needed for the majority. New Union (Social Liberals), led by Artūras Paulauskas, came second in the nationwide constituency (19.64 per cent), winning 29 seats in the parliament. The centre-right Liberal Union, led by the Mayor of Vilnius and former Prime Minister Rolandas Paksas, became as the largest single party in the parliament, with 34 seats and 17.25 per cent of the vote in the nationwide constituency. The possible "New Politics" Coalition (consisting Liberal Union, New Union (Social Liberals), Lithuanian Centre Union and Modern Christian-Democratic Union) won 66 seats, but it too came short of absolute majority.

The Homeland Union, which had led the government for the previous four years, performed poorly in the elections, receiving only 8.62 per cent of the vote and winning eight seats, down from more than 30% of the vote and 70 seats in the previous elections. Prime Minister Andrius Kubilius and many other prominent ministers were beaten in their constituencies. In the electoral campaign dominated by economic issues, the party was punished by voters for the economic recession and high unemployment, as well as its austerity policy. The Social Democratic coalition, on the other hand, had promised the end to austerity, including lower taxes and higher social spending.

| Party or alliance | | Proportional | | | Constituency | | | Total seats | +/– |
| Party or alliance | | Votes | % | Seats | Votes | % | Seats | Total seats | +/– |
|---|---|---|---|---|---|---|---|---|---|
| Social-Democratic; Coalition of Algirdas Brazauskas | Democratic Labour Party of Lithuania | 457,294 | 31.08 | 12 | 156,354 | 10.66 | 14 | 26 | +14 |
| Social-Democratic; Coalition of Algirdas Brazauskas | Social Democratic Party of Lithuania | 457,294 | 31.08 | 12 | 120,672 | 8.23 | 7 | 19 | +7 |
| Social-Democratic; Coalition of Algirdas Brazauskas | Lithuanian Russian Union | 457,294 | 31.08 | 3 | 4,446 | 0.30 | 0 | 3 | +3 |
| Social-Democratic; Coalition of Algirdas Brazauskas | New Democracy Party | 457,294 | 31.08 | 1 | 12,454 | 0.85 | 2 | 3 | +2 |
| New Union (Social Liberals) (Note: Two Modern Christian-Democratic Union candidates were elected in the nationwide constituency, having run on the lists of the New Union (Social Liberals) and the Liberal Union of Lithuania.) | | 288,895 | 19.64 | 18 | 225,878 | 15.41 | 11 | 28 | New |
| Liberal Union of Lithuania | | 253,823 | 17.25 | 16 | 229,438 | 15.65 | 18 | 33 | +32 |
| Homeland Union – Lithuanian Conservatives (Note: One Lithuanian Union of Political Prisoners and Deportees candidate was elected in the nationwide constituency, having run on the list of the Homeland Union.) | | 126,850 | 8.62 | 8 | 104,631 | 7.14 | 1 | 8 | –62 |
| Christian Democratic Union | | 61,583 | 4.19 | 0 | 33,221 | 2.27 | 1 | 1 | 0 |
| Lithuanian Peasants Party | | 60,040 | 4.08 | 0 | 96,853 | 6.61 | 4 | 4 | +3 |
| Lithuanian Christian Democratic Party | | 45,227 | 3.07 | 0 | 69,827 | 4.76 | 2 | 2 | –14 |
| Lithuanian Centre Union | | 42,030 | 2.86 | 0 | 89,837 | 6.13 | 2 | 2 | –11 |
| Union of Moderate Conservatives | | 29,615 | 2.01 | 0 | 42,116 | 2.87 | 1 | 1 | New |
| Electoral Action of Poles in Lithuania | | 28,641 | 1.95 | 0 | 40,376 | 2.75 | 2 | 2 | +1 |
| Lithuanian People's Union "For Just Lithuania" | | 21,583 | 1.47 | 0 | 5,323 | 0.36 | 0 | 0 | 0 |
| Lithuanian Liberty Union | | 18,622 | 1.27 | 0 | 23,202 | 1.58 | 1 | 1 | 0 |
| Union of Young Lithuania, New Nationalists and Political Prisoners (Note: Candidates of Lithuanian Democratic Party ran on the list of the Union of Young Lithuania, New Nationalists and Political Prisoners.) | | 16,941 | 1.15 | 0 | 16,729 | 1.14 | 1 | 1 | 0 |
| Lithuanian Nationalist; Union | Lithuanian Nationalist Union | 12,884 | 0.88 | 0 | 5,567 | 0.38 | 0 | 0 | 0 |
| Lithuanian Nationalist; Union | Lithuanian Liberty League | 12,884 | 0.88 | 0 | 4,685 | 0.32 | 0 | 0 | 0 |
| Lithuanian Party "Social Democracy – 2000" | | 7,219 | 0.49 | 0 | 32,336 | 2.21 | 0 | 0 | New |
| Modern Christian-Democratic Union | | | | | 17,929 | 1.22 | 1 | 3 | New |
| Lithuanian Union of Political Prisoners and Deportees | | | | | 8,495 | 0.58 | 0 | 1 | 0 |
| Homeland People's Party | | | | | 7,038 | 0.48 | 0 | 0 | New |
| National Democratic Party of Lithuania | | | | | 5,082 | 0.35 | 0 | 0 | New |
| Lithuanian Democratic Party | | | | | 3,323 | 0.23 | 0 | 0 | –2 |
| Socialist Party of Lithuania | | | | | 1,701 | 0.12 | 0 | 0 | 0 |
| Republican Party | | | | | 1,380 | 0.09 | 0 | 0 | 0 |
| Lithuanian Justice Party | | | | | 515 | 0.04 | 0 | 0 | 0 |
| Independents | | | | | 106,806 | 7.28 | 3 | 3 | –1 |
| Total | | 1,471,247 | 100.00 | 70 | 1,466,214 | 100.00 | 71 | 141 | 0 |
| Valid votes | | 1,471,247 | 95.55 | | 1,466,214 | 95.28 | | | |
| Invalid/blank votes | | 68,496 | 4.45 | | 72,585 | 4.72 | | | |
| Total votes | | 1,539,743 | 100.00 | | 1,538,799 | 100.00 | | | |
| Registered voters/turnout | | 2,626,321 | 58.63 | | 2,626,321 | 58.59 | | | |
Source: University of Essex

== Analysis ==
Social Democratic coalition won most votes in most of Lithuania. Kaunas and Vilnius were narrowly won by the Liberal Union of Lithuania, while New Union (Social Liberals) got the most votes in Trakai, Širvintos, Varėna, Kėdainiai and, to lesser extent, Vilnius districts. In these municipalities Liberal Union and New Union had their best performances in municipal elections of 2000.

== Aftermath ==
After disastrous results leaders of the Lithuanian Christian Democratic Party and the Lithuanian Centre Union, Algirdas Saudargas and Romualdas Ozolas, respectively, tendered resignations from their positions. Poor results would also affect other minor parties. Homeland People's Party leader Laima Liucija Andrikienė proposed merger of all center-right parties. It would happen gradually from 2001 to 2008, when the Homeland Union (which received their worst result ever in these elections) would merge with most them. Poor results also caused disintegration of the Lithuanian Centre Union, which would merge with the Liberal Union of Lithuania in 2003.

=== Government formation ===
The Liberal Union, the New Union (Social Liberals), the Centre Union, the Modern Christian Democrats and the Electoral Action of Poles in Lithuania formed a coalition after the election (these parties combined and two MPs, who joined New Union's parliamentary group, had 68 members), with Rolandas Paksas appointed as the new Prime Minister and Artūras Paulauskas elected as the Speaker of the Seimas. The coalition was not long-lasting and collapsed in June 2001 amid disagreements over privatisation and other reforms.
