= Life Logic Party of Lithuania =

Political party in Lithuania (1996–2009)

Life Logic Party of Lithuania Lietuvos gyvenimo logikos partija
- Leader: Vytautas Bernatonis
- Founded: August 14, 1996
- Dissolved: September 26, 2009
- Merged into: New Union (Social Liberals)
- Headquarters: 28-10 Architektų g., Vilnius
- Ideology: Anti-establishment; Populism

The Life Logic Party of Lithuania (Lithuanian: Lietuvos gyvenimo logikos partija) was a minor political party in Lithuania with an unclear political orientation. It is primarily known for being the target of a takeover attempt by Mindaugas Murza, Lithuanian neo-nazi politician, in 2001.

== History ==
The Life Logic Party was founded by former Mayor of Vilnius Vytautas Bernatonis in 1996 and participated in the 1996 Lithuanian parliamentary election, in which it received 3,361 votes, or 0.26% of the total vote. Afterwards, it became absent from the political scene. The party's chairman, Bernatonis, ran as a candidate for the Lithuanian People's Union "For a Just Lithuania", a heterodox alliance of socialist, far-right, Christian democratic and populist parties with a common platform of opposition to the influence of Western intelligence services and business oligarchs, in the 2000 Lithuanian parliamentary election.

In 2000, followers of Mindaugas Murza, leader of the neo-Nazi movement in Lithuania who was seeking to legalize his activities after the Ministry of Justice refused their registration, chose the Life Logic Party for entryism due to its small size and inactivity. On 10 December 2000, 400 neo-Nazis, including Murza himself, joined the party and immediately formed a majority of the party's members. The Nazi eagle and the "cross of crosses" became official symbols of the party and Murza's followers began organizing protests. However, in April 2001, Murza was expelled from the party by Bernatonis and his followers soon defected to the National Democratic Party of Lithuania.

Bernatonis suspended his own membership in the party in 2002 and ran as an independent candidate in the 2002–03 Lithuanian presidential election. He campaigned on expanding the powers of the President of Lithuania and delaying Lithuania's accession to the European Union and NATO. He received 3,121 votes, or 0.25% of the vote.

The party merged into the New Union in 2009. By then, the Supreme Electoral Commission had not received any reports from the party on its activities and membership for several years.

== Political program ==
In its 1996 electoral program, the party aligned itself with the idea of "life logic" and "common sense", and called to educate citizens of Lithuania in constitutional law, electoral law, and that "the opinions of 75 percent of voters are ignored by legislators". It promised to liquidate corruption, provide all citizens with work, perform an audit of the privatization process in Lithuania and attract foreign investment. It did not have a clear political orientation and primarily resorted to populist appeals.
