= Dalia Kutraitė-Giedraitienė =

Lithuanian politician

Dalia Kutraitė-Giedraitienė (born 18 April 1952) is a Lithuanian journalist, PR specialist and politician.

She studied at the Salomėja-Neris Secondary School in Kaunas, and graduated from Vilnius University in 1975 in journalism. From 1975 to 1988 she was an editor for Lithuanian National Radio and Television. From 1998 to 1999 she was a consultant of the mayor of Vilnius, Rolandas Paksas, and subsequently was given a position in the city government of Vilnius. From 1999 to 2001 she was a member of the Liberal Union of Lithuania and was a member of the Seimas from 9 November 2000 to 27 September 2002, but moved to the Order and Justice party. From 2005 she was Director of "Strateginių komunikacijų centras". She teaches at the Department of Journalism of Vilnius University.
