= Rimas Jonas Jankūnas =

Lithuanian surgeon and politician

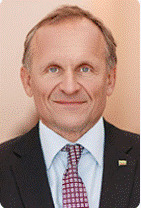

Member of the Seimas
- Incumbent
- Assumed office 27 October 2024
- Constituency: Lithuania

Personal details
- Born: 26 December 1967 (age 58) Kaunas, Soviet Union (now Lithuania)
- Party: People and Justice Union (2026–Now)
- Other political affiliations: LVŽKŠS (2024–2026)
- Education: Kaunas Medical Institute

Rimas Jonas Jankūnas (born 26 December 1967) is a Lithuanian university lecturer and politician.

== Education and work ==
In 1994, Jankūnas graduated from the Kaunas Medical Institute (now the Lithuanian University of Health Sciences). From 1994 to 2024, he worked at the Kaunas Medical Academy — first as an assistant, then as a doctoral student. Later, he taught as a lecturer and eventually as a docent.

At the same time, he worked as a sports commentator for the radio station Tau from 1994 to 1995. From 2003 to 2012, he served as deputy head of the State Medicines Control Agency. Between 2021 and 2024, he headed the Institute of Health Law which advocated against vaccination. In 2009, he was a member of the party Order and Justice.

Since 2024, Jankūnas has been a member of the 14th Seimas. On 19 November 2024, he became a member of the Health Committee. Since 4 December 2024, he has been part of the Commission for Addiction Prevention, and since 11 November 2025, also a member of the Commission for Freedom Struggles and Historical Memory.

Since 19 November 2024, he has been a member of the parliamentary group of the Union of Farmers, Greens, and Christian Families.
