= Stanislovas Buškevičius =

Lithuanian politician

Stanislovas Buškevičius (born 14 September 1958) is a Lithuanian politician and former member of the Seimas.

== Biography ==
Buškevičius was born Kaunas on 14 September 1958.

Buškevičius graduated from the Kaunas Polytechnic School (now Kaunas University of Technology) in 1977. In 1985, he graduated from the Vilnius University, with a degree in economics. In 1988, Buškevičius started lecturing at the Kaunas Institute of Medicine, before being suspended for political activities.

Buškevičius was never a member of the Communist Party and actively participated in resistance activities against the Soviet state. In 1988 he signed the manifesto of Young Lithuania, demanding independence and democracy for the country.

In the elections in 1996, Buškevičius was elected as the member of the Seventh Seimas in the single-seat constituency of Kalniečiai (15) in Kaunas. He was reelected in his constituency in 2000. Buškevičius failed in his reelection bid in 2004, finishing fourth in his single-seat constituency, with 10.5% of the vote.

Buškevičius is the leader of the political party Young Lithuania.

Seimas
Preceded by Povilas Katilius	Member of the Seimas for Kalniečiai; 1996–2004	Succeeded by Arimantas Dumčius
