= Vidmantas Plečkaitis =

Lithuanian painter, artist, public figure and politician

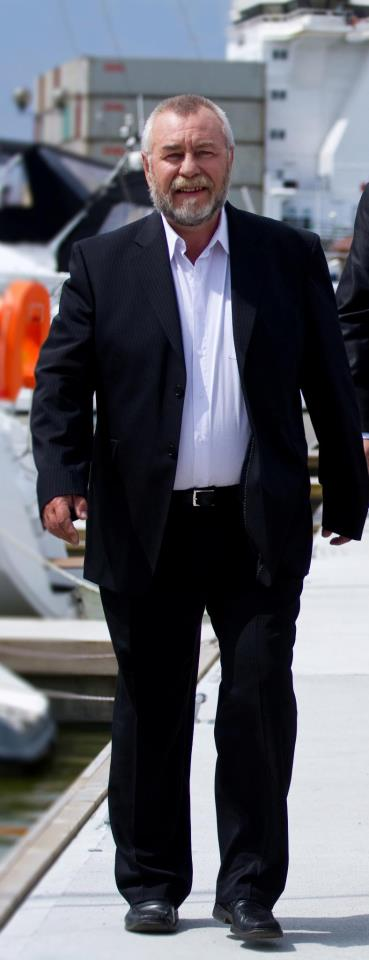
Vidmantas Plečkaitis in 2012

Vidmantas Plečkaitis (born 17 February 1957 in Klaipėda, Lithuanian SSR) is a Lithuanian painter, artist, public figure and politician, former vice mayor of city of Klaipėda.

== Biography ==
- 1983, the graduated from the Kaunas Polytechnic Institute, a mechanical engineer.
- 1997, director of R. Suslavičius food company Klaipeda's branch. 2000-2003 and 2003–2007, the Klaipeda City deputy mayor. From 2007 Klaipeda municipal council secretary.
- 1993 - member of Liberal Union of Lithuania. 2003 Liberal and Center Union Klaipeda department member, Vice-Chairman. 2006 the Chairman of the Department of Klaipeda Liberal and Center Union.
