= People and Justice Union =

People and Justice Union (Centrists, Nationalists) Tautos ir teisingumo sąjunga (centristai, tautininkai)
- Abbreviation: TTS
- Chairman: Rimas Jonas Jankūnas
- Vice Chairpeople: Naglis Puteikis; Sigitas Karbauskas; Ramojus Girinskas
- Chairman of the Political Council: Kristupas Krivickas
- Chairwoman of the Board: Rūta Zabielienė
- Executive Secretary: Aurelija Aleškevičienė
- Founded: 1 June 2003
- Split from: Lithuanian Centre Union
- Headquarters: Kaštonų g. 3, Vilnius, Lithuania
- Membership: 3,977 (2 October 2019)
- Ideology: Localism; Euroscepticism; Right-wing populism; Social conservatism
- Political position: Far-right
- European affiliation: Europe of Sovereign Nations Party (since 2024)
- European Parliament group: Europe of Sovereign Nations Group (since 2024)
- Colours: Dark blue Gold; Yellow, green, red (until 2021)
- Seimas: 1 / 141
- European Parliament: 1 / 11
- Municipal councils: 7 / 1,498
- Mayors: 0 / 60

Website
- tautateisingumas.lt

The People and Justice Union (Centrists, Nationalists) (Lithuanian: Tautos ir teisingumo sąjunga (centristai, tautininkai)) is a right-wing populist political party in Lithuania. The party chairman was Petras Gražulis until March 2026, when Rimas Jonas Jankūnas, a member of the Seimas, was elected party chairman.

== History ==
=== Background ===
Logo as the Lithuanian Centre Party

The party was established as the National Centre Party (Lithuanian: Nacionalinė centro partija), before being renamed the Lithuanian Centre Party (Lietuvos Centro partija) in 2005.

In the parliamentary election of 2016, the Lithuanian Centre Party participated in a coalition (Anti-corruption coalition of Kristupas Krivickas and Naglis Puteikis) with the Lithuanian Pensioners' Party, and received 6.1% of the popular vote and one seat. In the 2019 Lithuanian municipal elections, the Centre Party received 1.25% of votes nationwide and won municipal council seats in Klaipeda, Varena and Alytus (increasing the number of seats from 3 to 8). During the 2019 election to the European Parliament the party received 5.13% of the national vote, but did not receive any representatives in the European Parliament.

=== Foundation ===
On 26 October 2019, the Congress of the Lithuanian Centre Party decided to change the official name of the party to the Centre Party "Welfare Lithuania". The party fully supports the welfare state idea of the President of the Republic of Lithuania Gitanas Nausėda. In 2020, the party's name was changed again, this time to the Centre Party – Nationalists. In 2021 it merged with the Lithuanian Nationalist and Republican Union to become the People and Justice Union.

The party nominated Petras Gražulis in the 2024 Lithuanian presidential election, but his candidacy was rejected due to a prior impeachment.

The party operates an unofficial "Headquarter for the Reelection of Donald Trump in Lithuania", created in cooperation with members of the Lithuanian-American community. The party's chairman Gražulis is also the chairman of the headquarters.

On 7 March 2026, the Congress of the People and Justice Union (Centrists, Nationalists) elected Rimas Jonas Jankūnas, official member of the Seimas Lithuanian Farmers and Greens Union parliamentary faction as the new chairman of the party. Petras Gražulis confirmed his election. This is happening in the light of Ignas Vėgėlė attempts to unite small non-parliamentary Lithuanian political parties.

== Platform ==
According to the party's platform, the People and Justice Union

does not identify itself with any past or present ideology in Lithuania and operates as a national people's party. Guided by common sense and the good will of the Lithuanian people, in cooperation with interested national, confessional and social groups, it seeks, together with other political forces, the most favourable solutions for the development of the Lithuanian state and for Lithuania's consolidation in the world. The Party's main concern is to guarantee the positive participation of all national and international capital in the Lithuanian economy, the active and competitive functioning of medium and small capital, and the activities of the middle strata of society, entrepreneurs, security holders, farmers, science, culture and people of all intelligences.

It defines itself as centre. It has also been described as right-wing. It is populist and claims that the state is under the control of an oligarchic clan, opposes LGBT rights, supports small and medium business and the creation of a national commercial bank. It is soft Eurosceptic, demands the supremacy of national law over European law and describes the current system in the European Union as "a dictatorship of political correctness".

== Election results ==
=== Seimas ===
| Election | Leader | Votes (Note: Proportional representation votes.) | % | Seats | +/– | Government |
|---|---|---|---|---|---|---|
| 2024 | Petras Gražulis | 17,218 | 1.41 (#14) | 0 / 141 | New | Extra-parliamentary |

=== European Parliament ===
| Election | List leader | Votes | % | Seats | +/– | EP Group |
|---|---|---|---|---|---|---|
| 2019 | Antanas Guoga | 64,595 | 5.13 (#8) | 0 / 11 | New | – |
| 2024 | Petras Gražulis | 36,958 | 5.45 (#7) | 1 / 11 | ▲1 | ESN |

== Members of Parliaments current ==
=== Seimas ===
| Parliamentarian | Previous Mandate | Current mandate from | Constituency |
|---|---|---|---|
| Rimas Jonas Jankūnas | - | 2024 | Nationwide |

==== European Parliament ====
| Parliamentarian | Previous Mandate | Current Mandate from | Constituency |
|---|---|---|---|
| Petras Gražulis | - | 2024 | Lithuania |

== See also ==
- List of political parties in Lithuania
