= Young Lithuania =

Young Lithuania Partija "Jaunoji Lietuva"
- Leader: Stanislovas Buškevičius
- Founded: February 13, 2009
- Headquarters: L. Sapiegos g. 5/12, Kaunas
- Membership: none
- Ideology: Right-wing populism Lithuanian nationalism National conservatism Social conservatism
- Political position: Right-wing to far-right
- Seimas: 0 / 141
- European Parliament: 0 / 11
- Municipal councils: 0 / 1,524

Website
- www.jaunojilietuva.lt

Young Lithuania (Lithuanian: Partija "Jaunoji Lietuva") is a nationalist political party in Lithuania. The party has no seats in the Seimas, European Parliament or local municipalities. The leader of the party is Stanislovas Buškevičius.

== History ==
The party was established in 1994 after Political Parties' Act was introduced as a reference to the Young Lithuania youth organization, which was established by the Lithuanian Nationalist Union as its youth wing in 1927. The newly formed organisation had its best performance in Kaunas. Here, it managed to elect its leader, Stanislovas Buškevičius, as member of Seimas between 1996 and 2004.

Following the municipal elections in 2011, the party received 6.49% of the votes in Kaunas city municipality council and won 4 seats there. It had no seats in the other municipalities. In the municipal elections in 2015 the party failed to win any seats.

In the 2016 parliamentary election, the party participated in a coalition with Lithuanian Nationalists and received 0.54% of the vote.

== Election results ==
Election year	# of overall votes	% of overall vote	# of overall seats won	+/–	Government
1996	52,423	4.01 (#6)	1 / 141	▲1	Opposition
2000	16,941	1.15 (#13)	1 / 141	Steady	Opposition (2001–2004)
2004	–	–	0 / 141	▼1	Extra-parliamentary
2008	21,589	1.75 (#12)	0 / 141	Steady	Extra-parliamentary
2012	8,632	0.66 (#14)	0 / 141	Steady	Extra-parliamentary
2016	6,867 (Alliance with the Nationalist Union)	0.56 (#13)	0 / 141	Steady	Extra-parliamentary
2020	–	–	0 / 141	Steady	Extra-parliamentary
