= Romanas Plečkaitis =

Lithuanian philosopher (1933–2009)

Romanas Plečkaitis (11 August 1933 – 17 August 2009 in Vilnius, Lithuania) was a Lithuanian philosopher, logic, philosophy, history researcher, Doctor habil, Professor. Romanas Plečkaitis translated the main Immanuel Kant works into Lithuanian language, wrote the history of Lithuanian philosophy and logic issues, published over 300 publications in various academic, has developed 27 PhDs.

== Biography ==
Although he finished The Kalvarijos Gymnasium, he was unable to continue onto higher education due to lack of funds. He became employed in a local newspaper as an editor. After a year he enrolled in what was then the Vilnius Pedagogical Institute, in which he studied logic and psychology. In 1956 having graduated with the highest honours, he became a lecturer at the institute, a post he retained until 1963. As a lecturer he gave a lot of attention to the improvement of the scientific qualification. Attention to philosophical ideas, encouraged him to organise a science doctorate dissertation. For the young scientist in the environment of the time, there were not particularly accommodating conditions for scientific exploration. Pleckaitis was largely influenced by his dissertation supervisor, a scientist and philosopher known throughout Europe- Vosylius Sezeman. He encouraged Pleckaitis to take an interest in the evolution of Lithuanian philosophy. Pleckaitis was particularly interested in scholastic logic. He based his doctorate dissertation on- "Scholastic logic and its decline in Lithuania" and became the founder of systematic investigation of history of Lithuanian philosophy.

In the same year Pleckaitis began work in Vilnius university. In 1968 he completed a doctorate dissertation- "Philosophy in Lithuanian schools XVI-XVIII", in 1971 he became a professor. In 1975 the professor published "Philosophy of feudalism in Lithuania," which gained the state recognition award in 1977. In 1979 Pleckaitis was awarded the Lithuanian TSR 'nusipelnusio Mokslo veikejo' name of honour.

From 1969 Pleckaitis also worked in the Lithuanian institute of philosophy and sociology. He was the head of this institute, and the head of history of Lithuanian philosophy from 1990 to 2003. He also worked in Vilnius University from 1991 to 2002.
