= Romualdas Rudzys =

Lithuanian politician (born 1947)

Romualdas Rudzys (born 9 June 1947) is a Lithuanian politician. In 1990 he was among those who signed the Act of the Re-Establishment of the State of Lithuania.

== See also ==
- Politics of Lithuania
