= Dawn of Nemunas =

Political party in Lithuania

Political Party "Dawn of Nemunas" Politinė partija "Nemuno Aušra"
- Abbreviation: off. PPNA inf. NA
- Chairperson: Remigijus Žemaitaitis
- Founder: Remigijus Žemaitaitis
- Founded: 11 November 2023
- Split from: Freedom and Justice
- Membership (2024): 2,296
- Ideology: Right-wing populism; National conservatism; Anti-establishment
- Political position: Right-wing
- Colours: Orange; Brown
- Seimas: 17 / 141
- European Parliament: 0 / 11
- Municipal councils: 7 / 1,461
- Mayors: 0 / 60

Website
- nemunoausra.lt

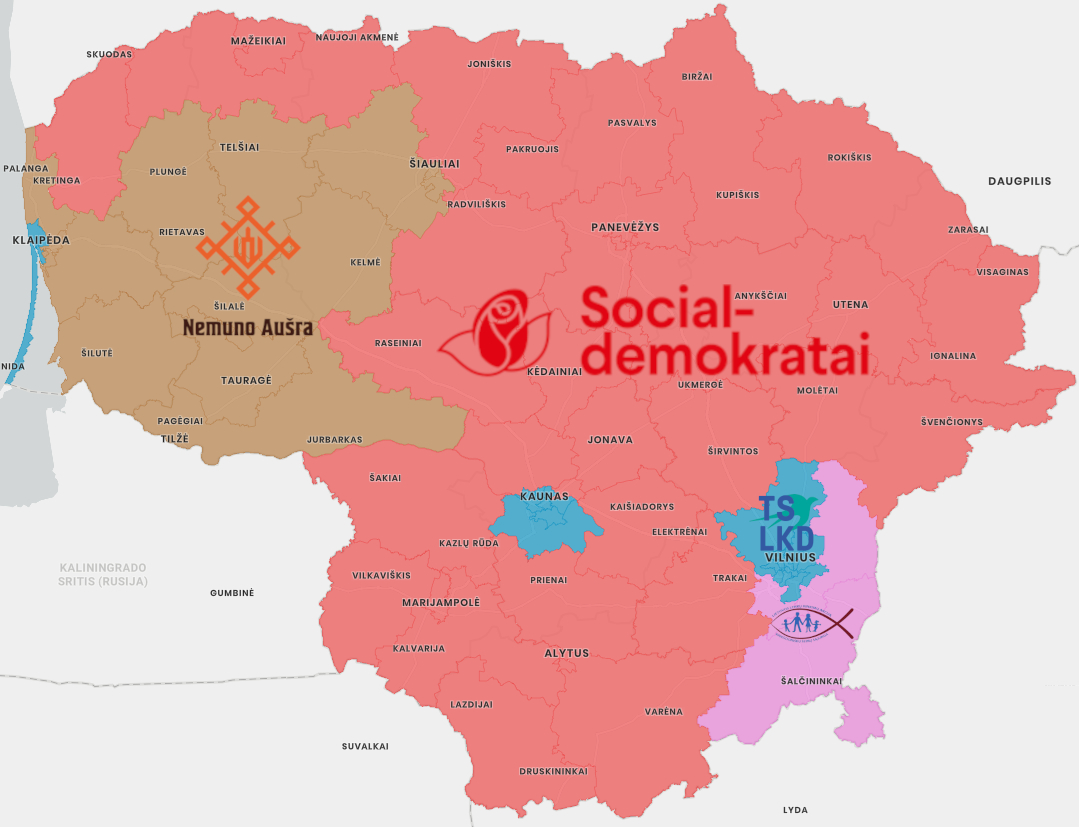
Dawn of Nemunas received a plurality of votes in the southern parts of Samogitia and Lithuania Minor in the 2024 Lithuanian parliamentary election

The Political Party "Dawn of Nemunas" (Lithuanian: Politinė partija "Nemuno Aušra", PPNA), often shortened to Dawn of Nemunas or Nemunas Dawn (Lithuanian: Nemuno aušra, NA), is a political party in Lithuania, led by Remigijus Žemaitaitis. It was founded in November 2023 after his expulsion from the party Freedom and Justice.

The ideological classifications of the party differs. Dawn of Nemunas is described as right-wing in social issues, while on economic issues it has often been described as centre-left. The party characterises itself as centre-left.

== History ==
=== Background ===
In May 2023, Remigijus Žemaitaitis published antisemitic comments on Facebook, in which he claimed that "the Jews and Russians" oppressed ethnic Lithuanians during the Second World War and were responsible for the 1944 massacre of the village of Pirčiupiai. The comments were received with harsh criticism and condemnation from Lithuanian politicians, the Lithuanian Jewish community and numerous ambassadors to Lithuania. Žemaitaitis later claimed that his comments were targeted towards Israel and claimed that he would support a death sentence for Benjamin Netanyahu for his actions against Palestinians. The Office of the Prosecutor General launched an ongoing investigation into Žemaitaitis' actions. On 19 May 2023, Freedom and Justice terminated Žemaitaitis's membership, and Artūras Paulauskas became the party's interim chairman.

=== Foundation ===
On 11 November 2023, Žemaitaitis announced the creation of a political party under the name Dawn of Nemunas (NA), named after the country's largest river and the country's first newspaper, Aušra, a major symbol of the 19th-century Lithuanian National Revival. He also said that his party planned to take part in all elections held in 2024 and nominate its own presidential candidate. Earlier, Žemaitaitis said he had gathered 3,164 people to form the party, of whom 2,950 participated in the founding convention. He also claimed that most of the Freedom and Justice faction had joined the new party.

The party was registered on 16 January 2024. The party had 2,296 inaugural members during the registration. Around that time, Lithuanian Prosecutor General Nida Grunskienė asked the parliament to strip Žemaitaitis of his legal immunity, stating that the pre-trial investigation suggests that Žemaitaitis "publicly ridiculed, expressed contempt for, and incited hatred against a group of people of Jewish nationality", after which the politician announced his bid for the presidency as the NA's candidate. He resigned from the Seimas on 2 May, after the Constitutional Court of Lithuania ruled towards his impeachment. Žemaitaitis finished in fourth place in the presidential election, receiving 9.21% of the vote in the first round held on 12 May.

Agnė Širinskienė, former member of the Lithuanian Farmers and Greens Union, and Aidas Gedvilas and Artūras Skardžius, formerly from the Labour Party, joined Dawn of Nemunas on 19 June 2024. With Žemaitaitis's previous resignation from parliament, this increased the party's representation to three members of the Seimas.

=== 2024 parliamentary election ===
In July 2024, ahead of the 2024 Lithuanian parliamentary election, polls showed that about 36.5% of voters would be willing to consider voting for the party. Supporters of the Labour Party, Lithuanian Regions Party, and Lithuanian Farmers and Greens Union were most likely to view Žemaitaitis favorably. He was also viewed favorably by a large percentage of voters from centre-left parties and around a fifth of Liberals' Movement voters, while supporters of the centre-right Homeland Union (TS–LKD) were least likely to support him. In August, the party's polling surpassed 10%, overtaking the ruling TS-LKD.

Prior to the election, Prime Minister Ingrida Šimonytė of the TS–LKD and President Gitanas Nausėda warned parties against forming a coalition with NA due to Žemaitaitis's antisemitic statements. TS-LKD leader Gabrielius Landsbergis urged other parties to form a cordon sanitaire against it. After the president's warnings, the Social Democratic Party of Lithuania (LSDP), which had initially viewed NA as a potential partner after elections, ruled out forming a coalition with it.

The election was held in two rounds on 13 and 27 October 2024. NA came in third place overall in the election, receiving about 15% of the vote and securing 20 seats in parliament. On 7 November, the LSDP backtracked from their earlier position, and invited NA and the Union of Democrats "For Lithuania" (DSVL) to form a ruling coalition.

On 8 November, the New York Times published an article about the party, focusing largely on Žemaitaitis's reputation for antisemitism. The same day, over thirty non-governmental organizations based in Lithuania signed an open letter to the LSDP against allowing NA into the government, stating that the party's inclusion would harm human rights, democracy, and national security, as well as the country's international reputation. On 8 November, United States Senator Ben Cardin, the chair of the Senate Foreign Relations Committee, also released a statement condemning the decision. Further criticism came from German MPs Roderich Kiesewetter and Michael Roth, Polish senator Michał Kamiński, and the Israeli embassy.

Both Žemaitaitis and the presumptive prime minister and LSDP deputy chair Gintautas Paluckas claimed that the foreign outcry had been instigated by their political opponents. Paluckas also stated that Žemaitaitis would not hold a cabinet position. Žemaitaitis sent a letter to the ambassadors of NATO and EU countries, as well as Israel, explaining his stance that he was not antisemitic and had only meant to criticize Israel's actions against Palestinians. In the letter he also mentioned that he had met with the Jewish community of Kaunas during the campaign to express solidarity.

The coalition agreement signed by LSDP, DSVL, and NA included a clause about combating antisemitism. Despite these assurances, protests against NA were held in Vilnius on 14 November, the day of the first session of the Fourteenth Seimas, and on 21 November, the date Paluckas was confirmed as the new PM. During the second protest, Paluckas made an appearance and tried to dispel concerns about the coalition, but the protesters shouted "shame" at him.

On 28 November 2024, the list of nominees for the Paluckas Cabinet was officially presented to President Nausėda. It included three candidates proposed by Dawn of Nemunas: Ignas Hofmanas for Minister of Agriculture, Sigitas Podėnas for Minister of Environment, and Virginijus Kulikauskas for Minister of Justice.

On 29 November 2024, the European People's Party and Renew Europe groups of the European Parliament published a letter urging the LSDP and DSVL to exclude NA from the ruling coalition due to concerns about antisemitism. However, the LSDP and DSVL did choose NA as its government partner, and the coalition government comprising these three parties was sworn in on 12 December 2024.

In August 2025, the LSDP expelled the Union of Democrats "For Lithuania" (DSVL) from the coalition and invited LVŽS and the Electoral Action of Poles in Lithuania – Christian Families Alliance (AWPL–ZChR) to replace it. On 25 September 2025, the new government composed of LSDP, NA, Fand AWPL–ZChR was sworn in, bringing LVŽS back to power.

=== Removal from government ===
On 6 June 2026, the government was swapped again, as LSDP removed the Dawn of Nemunas from the coalition and invited the DSVL back. On 18 June, a new coalition agreement was signed between the LSDP, DSVL, and LVŽKŠS.

== European affiliation ==
In December 2025, Žemaitaitis stated the party planned to join the Patriots for Europe grouping in the European Parliament.

== Ideology ==
Dawn of Nemunas describes itself as a centre-left, classical liberal, and Christian party. The party's leader, Remigijus Žemaitaitis, proposed forming a centre-left coalition in October 2024. According to Žemaitaitis, the party leans "centre-left on social issues related to people's wellbeing", but is "on the right when it comes to what makes statehood – our language, culture and national identity".

The party has been described as populist. It has also been called far-right on the public broadcaster Lithuanian National Radio and Television. According to political scientist Virgis Valentinavičius, Žemaitaitis deliberately invokes common antisemitic tropes such as "Jewish parasites" to attract poorly-educated voters. Europe Elects describes the party as right-wing. In November 2023, shortly after the party was founded, Delfi described it as centre-right. The party was described in 2024 by political scientist Vladimiras Laučius as nationalist, as right-wing nationalist by Deutsche Welle, and as on the radical right by bne IntelliNews. The party has also been described as centre-left, as well as combining economically left-wing and socially right-wing policies. Linas Kojala, director of the Eastern Europe Studies Centre think tank, said, "It's very hard to describe what kind of ideology they represent and where they stand on the scale of left to right."

Economically, the party holds populist, etatist and some left-wing positions. It supports the establishment of a state-owned bank and a road fund, granting tax breaks to large families, and taking state control of the shares of state-owned energy holding company Ignitis. Conversely, it rejects the EU's green agricultural programs and supports concessions for small and medium-sized businesses. It supports halting reforms in education for four years and auditing the reorganization of the network of schools and health care institutions. Dawn of Nemunas' program states that Lithuania's foreign policy must first serve Lithuania's own security and the interests of its citizens. The party does not directly reject aid for Ukraine, although Žemaitaitis has said that Lithuania should be able to trade with Russia if other countries of the Western world can. It pledges to not raise value added taxes to finance national defense.

== Election results ==
=== Seimas ===
Election	Leader	Votes	%	Seats	+/–	Government
2024	Remigijus Žemaitaitis	186,305	15.26 (#3)	20 / 141	▲20	Coalition (2024–2025)
2024	Remigijus Žemaitaitis	186,305	15.26 (#3)	20 / 141	▲20	Coalition (2025–2026)
2024	Remigijus Žemaitaitis	186,305	15.26 (#3)	20 / 141	▲20	Opposition (since 2026)
