= New Democracy Party (Lithuania) =

The New Democracy Party (Lithuanian: Naujosios demokratijos partija, NDP) was a political party in Lithuania.

== History ==
=== Origin ===
The party was originally named the Lithuanian Women's Party (Lietuvos moterų partija) and first ran in the 1996 parliamentary elections. It received 3.7% of the vote and won a single seat.

=== Renaming ===
Prior to the 2000 elections, the party was renamed the New Democracy Party. It contested the elections as part of the Social-Democratic Coalition of Algirdas Brazauskas. The coalition won 51 seats, three of which were taken by the NDP.

=== The merge ===
In 2001, the party merged with the Lithuanian Peasants Party to form the Union of Peasants and New Democracy Parties.
