= Česlovas Juršėnas =

Lithuanian politician (born 1938)

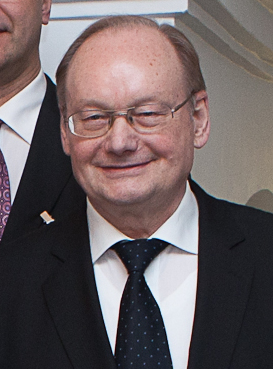
- Juršėnas in 2011

Speaker of Seimas
- In office 1 April 2008 – 14 November 2008
- Preceded by: Viktoras Muntianas
- Succeeded by: Arūnas Valinskas
- In office 25 February 1993 – 25 November 1996
- Preceded by: Algirdas Brazauskas Himself (acting)
- Succeeded by: Vytautas Landsbergis

Acting Speaker of Seimas
- In office 25 November 1992 – 25 February 1993
- Acting for: Algirdas Brazauskas
- In office 6 April 2004 – 12 July 2004
- Acting for: Artūras Paulauskas

Personal details
- Born: 18 May 1938 (age 87) Panižiškė, Poland
- Political party: Social Democratic Party of Lithuania (since 2001); Democratic Labour Party of Lithuania (1990-2001); Communist Party of Lithuania (until 1989)
- Spouse: Jadvyga Juršėnienė
- Children: Saulius Juršėnas

Česlovas Juršėnas (born 18 May 1938) is a Lithuanian politician and a former Speaker of the Seimas, the Lithuanian parliament.

In 1955, he graduated from Ignalina secondary school (now Ignalina Česlovas Kudaba Progymnasium) with a gold medal and entered Vilnius State University of Vincas Kapsukas, graduating in 1960.

During 1960–1964 Juršėnas was an employee of a newspaper Tiesa.

He was a signatory of the Act of the Re-Establishment of the State of Lithuania on 11 March 1990.

Juršėnas has published several books about politics and the world.

== See also ==
- List of speakers of the Seimas
