= Lithuanian Farmers, Greens and Christian Families Union =

Lithuanian Farmers, Greens and Christian Families Union Lietuvos valstiečių, žaliųjų ir Krikščioniškų šeimų sąjunga
- Abbreviation: LVŽKŠS
- Chair: Eimantas Kirkutis
- Deputy chair: Valius Ąžuolas
- Party leaders: Aurelijus Veryga; Waldemar Tomaszewski
- Founders: Ramūnas Karbauskis; Waldemar Tomaszewski
- Founded: 14 November 2024
- Member parties: LVŽS; LLRA–KŠS
- Ideology: Social conservatism Traditionalist conservatism Familialism; Agrarianism
- Political position: Syncretic
- European affiliation: European Conservatives and Reformists Party
- European Parliament group: European Conservatives and Reformists Group
- Colours: Light green
- Seimas: 9 / 141
- European Parliament (Lithuanian seats): 2 / 11

The Lithuanian Farmers, Greens and Christian Families Union (Lithuanian: Lietuvos valstiečių, žaliųjų ir Krikščioniškų šeimų sąjunga; LVŽKŠS) is a parliamentary group in the Seimas of Lithuania uniting the Lithuanian Farmers and Greens Union and the Electoral Action of Poles in Lithuania – Christian Families Alliance, two socially conservative parties.

== History ==
The Lithuanian Farmers, Greens and Christian Families Union group was formed on the first day of the 14th Seimas, 14 November 2024. Aušrinė Norkienė from LVŽS became the chairperson of the faction, and Rita Tamašunienė from LLRA–KŠS became the vice-chairperson. The total number of Seimas deputies of the group at the time of its formation was 11:8 of them from LVŽS and 3 from LLRA–KŠS. The group was founded as part of the opposition to the then forming Paluckas Cabinet, following the LSDP's decision to sign a coalition government with controversial Dawn of Nemunas party instead of LVŽS.

== Ideology ==
After its formation, LVŽKŠS stated that "it will be the only faction in this Seimas that will consistently represent traditional values and the policy of the natural family." The then leader of LVŽS, Ramūnas Karbauskis, stated that "LVŽS and LLRA–KŠS have experience of working together not only in previous Seimas terms, but also in the European Parliament. Currently, representatives of our parties work together in the European Conservatives and Reformists faction representing traditional values." The faction also announced its intention to focus on other issues "related to the well-being of Lithuanian residents": the fight against poverty, the gap between regions and cities.

== See also ==
- League and Self-Defense
