= Liberal Union of Lithuania =

Political party in Lithuania

Liberal Union of Lithuania Lietuvos liberalų sąjunga
- Abbreviation: LLS
- Founded: 25 November 1990
- Dissolved: 31 May 2003
- Split from: Sąjūdis
- Merged into: Liberal and Centre Union
- Ideology: Liberalism; Classical liberalism Populism (under Paksas)
- Political position: Centre

The Liberal Union of Lithuania (Lithuanian: Lietuvos liberalų sąjunga (LLS)) was a liberal political party in Lithuania.

== History ==
The party was founded on the 25th of November, 1990 on the basis of the Vilnius University Liberal Club. Its first leader was Vilnius University philosophy professor Vytautas Radžvilas. In the 1992 parliamentary election, the Liberal Union got 1.51 percent of votes and failed to win any seats. In January 1993 the party congress agreed upon declaration, which stated that the party would position itself on the right. In 1994 the party's membership grew. Most of these new members were either former politicians (e. g. former Moderates Movement's leader Eugenijus Gentvilas) or employees of the infamous East-Baltic States-West investment company.

In the 1995 municipal election, the party got 2.69 percent of the votes nationally and 40 councillors. Most of these gains were city districts (e. g. Birštonas, Marijampolė, Klaipėda). After these elections many members of Liberal Union in Kaunas resigned. In the 1996 parliamentary election, the party received 1.84 percent of the votes and one mandate. In the 1997 municipal election, the party won 3.99 percent of the votes. As a result, the Liberal Union managed to form coalitions with other parties and win mayorships (most notably, in Klaipėda).

The party's breakthrough came in late 1999, when former Prime Minister of Lithuania (and Homeland Union member) Rolandas Paksas became the party's leader. In 2000 municipal election the Liberal Union won 13.99 percent of the votes (first place was won by the New Union (Social Liberals) with 16.68 percent of the votes) and mayorships in three major cities, Vilnius, Kaunas and Klaipėda. In the parliamentary election of the same year, the party won 17.25 percent of the votes and 34 seats in Seimas. By this, the Liberal Union was the largest single party in Seimas for four months in 2000 and 2001.

After these elections, the Liberal Union formed a coalition with the New Union (Social Liberals), the Lithuanian Centre Union, the Modern Christian Democrats and the Electoral Action of Poles in Lithuania (with support from the Lithuanian Peasants Party). This coalition lasted for seven months, when New Union (Social Liberals) withdrew their government ministers.

After this, the party joined the opposition. By December 2001, Rolandas Paksas (and some of his followers) left the Liberal Union and founded the Liberal Democratic Party. Along this split, the party started negotiations with former coalition partners, the Lithuanian Centre Union and the Modern Christian Democrats, about merger. All three parties merged into Liberal and Centre Union in 2003.

== Prominent members ==
- Eugenijus Gentvilas
- Vidmantas Plečkaitis
- Dalia Kutraitė-Giedraitienė
- Artūras Zuokas

== See also ==
- Liberalism
- Contributions to liberal theory
- Liberalism worldwide
- List of liberal parties
- Liberal democracy
- Liberalism in Lithuania
