= Modern Christian-Democratic Union =

Lithuanian political party (1998–2003)

Modern Christian-Democratic Union, (Lithuanian: Modernieji krikščionys demokratai) was a political party in Lithuania that existed between 1998 and 2003. In 2003, the party joined forces with the Liberal Union of Lithuania (Lietuvos liberalų sąjunga) and the Centre Union of Lithuania (Lietuvos centro sąjunga) to form the Liberal and Centre Union (Liberalų ir centro sąjunga).
