= Lithuanian Peasants Party =

The Lithuanian Peasants Party (Lithuanian: Lietuvos valstiečių partija, LVP) was a political party in Lithuania.

== History ==
The party was established in 1990 as the Lithuanian Peasants Union; it became the Lithuanian Peasants Party in 1994. It won a single seat in the 1992 elections and managed to retain the seat in the 1996 elections.

In 1998, the second seat in Seimas was gained after independent MP Ramūnas Karbauskis joined the party and became its chairman. Four seats were gained in the 2000 elections.

In 2001, the party merged with the New Democracy Party to form the Union of Peasants and New Democracy Parties.

== Election results ==
Election	Votes	%	Seats	+/–	Position	Government
1992	Participated in coalition along with Liberal Union of Lithuania	-	1 / 141	▲1	▲9th	Opposition
1996	22,826 (PR)	1.75	1 / 141	1	▼14th	Opposition
2000	60,040 (PR)	4.08	4 / 141	▲3	▲6th	Opposition
