= Seimas =

Unicameral parliament of Lithuania

Seimas of the Lithuanian Republic Lietuvos Respublikos Seimas
- 14th Seimas

Type
- Type: Unicameral

History
- Founded: 1445; 581 years ago (historical) 22 August 1922; 104 years ago 1992; 34 years ago
- Disbanded: 1940–1991

Leadership
- Speaker: Juozas Olekas, LSDP since 11 September 2025
- First Deputy Speaker: Domas Griškevičius, DSVL since 14 July 2026
- Deputy Speakers: Rasa Budbergytė, LSDP since 14 November 2024
- Viktorija Čmilytė-Nielsen, LS since 14 November 2024
- Orinta Leiputė, LSDP since 14 November 2024
- Radvilė Morkūnaitė-Mikulėnienė, TS-LKD since 14 November 2024
- Aušrinė Norkienė, LVŽS since 11 September 2025
- Jūratė Zailskienė, LSDP since 14 July 2026
- Daiva Žebelienė, PPNA since 9 April 2025
- Leader of the Opposition (Lithuania): Vacant

Structure
- Seats: 141
- Political groups: Government (Sinkevičius Cabinet) (75): LSDP (53) (Note: Including the seat of Speaker of the Seimas Juozas Olekas, who does not officially belong to any parliamentary group.); DSVL (13); LVŽKŠS (9) (Note: LVŽS (6); LLRA-KŠS (3)); Opposition (56): TS–LKD (28); NA (17); LS (11); Non-attached (9): NS (1); TTS (1); Independent and political committees (7); Vacant (1)

Elections
- Voting system: Parallel voting; 70 party-list seats with a 5% threshold (7% for alliances) and 71 runoff seats
- First election: 10–11 October 1922 25 October and 15 November 1992
- Last election: 13 and 27 October 2024
- Next election: 8 October 2028 or the 2026 Northern Nalšia district by-election
- Redistricting: Every four years

Meeting place
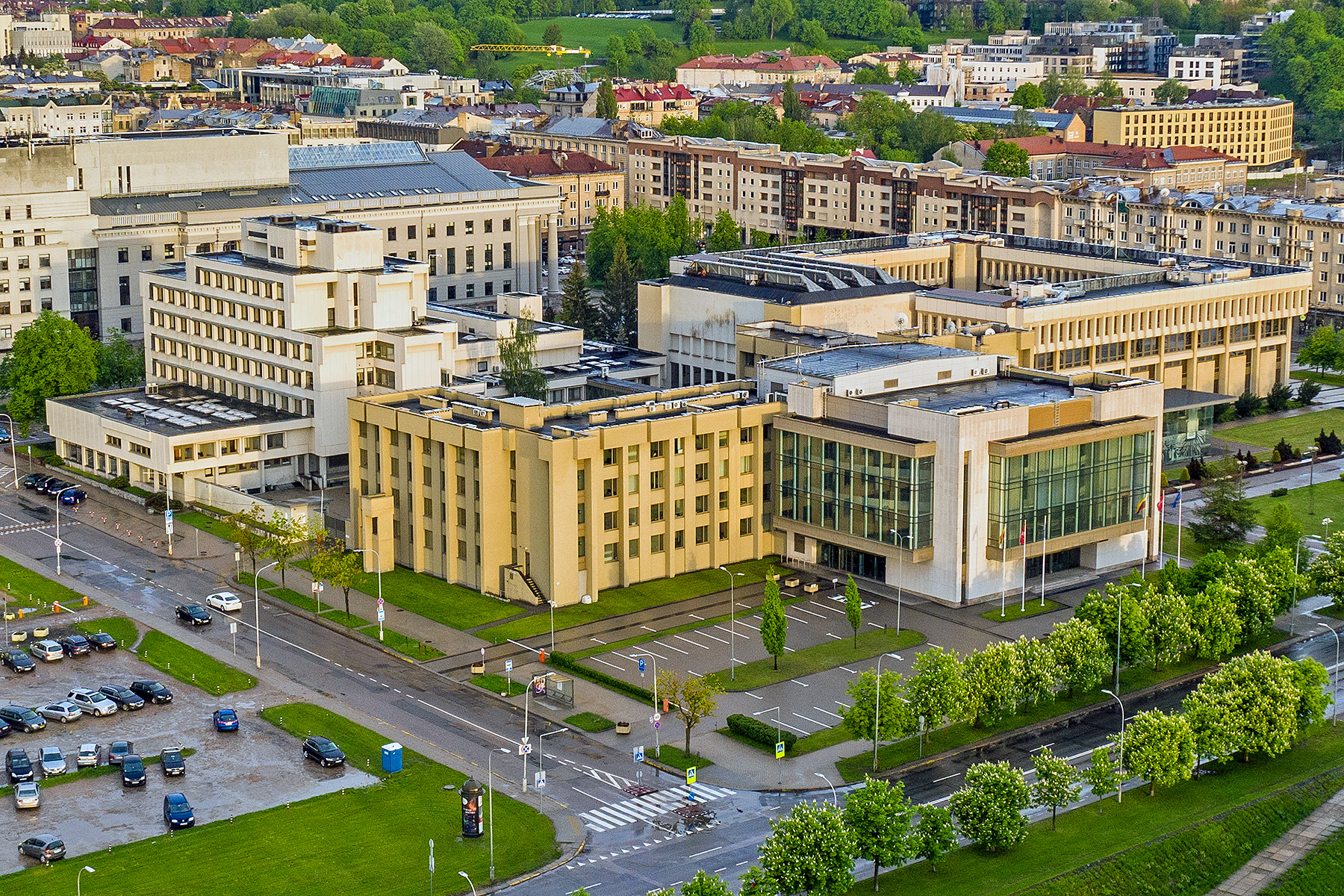
- Seimas Palace, Vilnius

Website
- lrs.lt

The Seimas of the Lithuanian Republic (Lithuanian: Lietuvos Respublikos Seimas), or simply the Seimas (/ˈseɪməs/ SAY-məs; Lithuanian: [ˈsɛɪˑmɐs]), is the unicameral legislative body of the Republic of Lithuania.

The Seimas constitutes the legislative branch of government in Lithuania, enacting laws and amendments to the Constitution, passing the budget, confirming the Prime Minister and the Government and controlling their activities. The Seimas traces its origins to the Seimas of the Grand Duchy of Lithuania and the Sejm of the Polish-Lithuanian Commonwealth, as well as the Seimas of inter-war Lithuania. The first Seimas after the restoration of independence of Lithuania convened in 1992.

Its 141 members are elected for a four-year term, with 71 elected in individual constituencies, and 70 elected in a nationwide vote based on open list proportional representation. A party must receive at least 5%, and a multi-party union at least 7%, of the national vote to qualify for the proportional representation seats. Following the elections in 2024, the Social Democratic Party of Lithuania is the largest party in the Seimas, signing an agreement to form a coalition government with the Union of Democrats "For Lithuania" and the Dawn of Nemunas.

== History ==
=== Origins ===
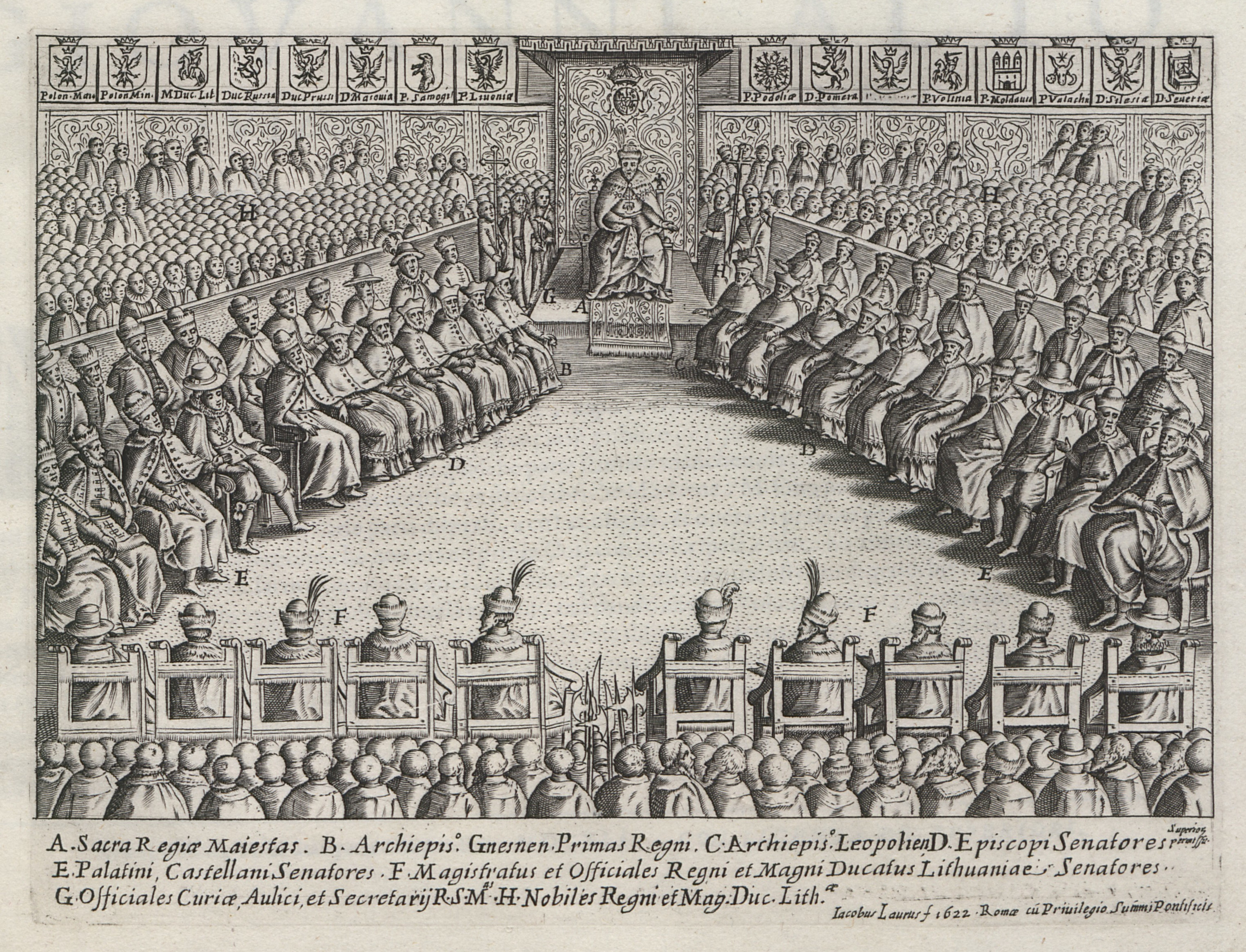
Sejm session at the Royal Castle, Warsaw, 1622

From an etymological standpoint, the word is of Slavic origin, being derived from Polish sejm via Ruthenian sejmъ, sėjmъ. The first traces of large nobility meetings can be found in the negotiations for Treaty of Salynas in 1398. However, it is considered that the first Seimas met in Hrodna in 1445 during talks between Casimir IV Jagiellon and the Council of Lords. As the Muscovite–Lithuanian Wars raged, the Grand Duke needed more tax revenues to finance the army and had to call the Seimas more frequently. In exchange for increased taxation, the nobility demanded various privileges, including strengthening the Seimas.

At first the Seimas did not have the legislative power. It would debate on foreign and domestic affairs, taxes, wars and treasury. At this time, there were no rules regulating how frequently the Seimas would assemble, who could participate, how the sessions should take place or what functions the Seimas had. At the beginning of the 16th century, the Seimas acquired some legislative powers and could petition the Grand Duke to pass certain laws, which the Duke usually granted in exchange for nobility's support and cooperation in taxation and war matters.

Major reforms were carried out between 1564 and 1566, just before the Union of Lublin. In the Second Statute of Lithuania, the Seimas acquired full legislative powers, acting as the lower house of the parliament, with the Lithuanian Council of Lords as the upper house. It was at this point that elections to the Seimas were introduced (local nobles would elect their delegates) – any noble could participate in the Seimas before.

Seimas of the Grand Dutchy was abolished in 1569, with the Union of Lublin. The Union created a new state, the Polish–Lithuanian Commonwealth, and joined the Seimas of Lithuania with the Sejm of Poland into a single Sejm of the Polish–Lithuanian Commonwealth. By this time, 40 Seimas of Lithuania had taken place.

Nobles of Lithuania continued to meet until the partitions of the Polish–Lithuanian Commonwealth under the name of Lithuanian Convocations. They debated matters concerning the Grand Duchy of Lithuania or tried to establish a common position among Lithuanian delegates before departing for the Sejm of the Commonwealth.

The Sejm of the Commonwealth, General Sejm, was the parliament of Polish-Lithuanian Commonwealth from the Union of Lublin until the late 18th century. The sejm was a powerful political institution, and from early 16th century, the Polish king (who was the Grand Duke of Lithuania) could not pass laws without the approval of that body.

Duration and frequencies of the sejms changed over time, with the six-week sejm session convened every two years being most common. Sejm locations changed throughout history, eventually with the Commonwealth capital of Warsaw emerging as the primary location. The number of sejm deputies and senators grew over time, from about 70 senators and 50 deputies in the 15th century to about 150 senators and 200 deputies in the 18th century. Early sejms have seen mostly majority voting, but beginning in the 17th century, unanimous voting became more common, and 32 sejms were vetoed with the infamous liberum veto, particularly in the first half of the 18th century. This vetoing procedure has been credited with significantly paralyzing the Commonwealth governance. In addition, beginning in 1573, three special types of sejms handled the process of the royal election in the interregnum period.

assembly held on December 4 and 5, 1905 in Vilnius, Lithuania, then part of the Russian Empire, largely inspired by the Russian Revolution of 1905. It was the first modern national congress in Lithuania, with over 2,000 participants. The assembly made the decision to demand wide political autonomy within the Russian Empire and achieve this by peaceful means. It is considered an important step towards the Act of Independence of Lithuania, adopted on February 16, 1918 by the Council of Lithuania, as the Seimas laid the groundwork for the establishment of an independent Lithuanian state.

=== Interwar period ===
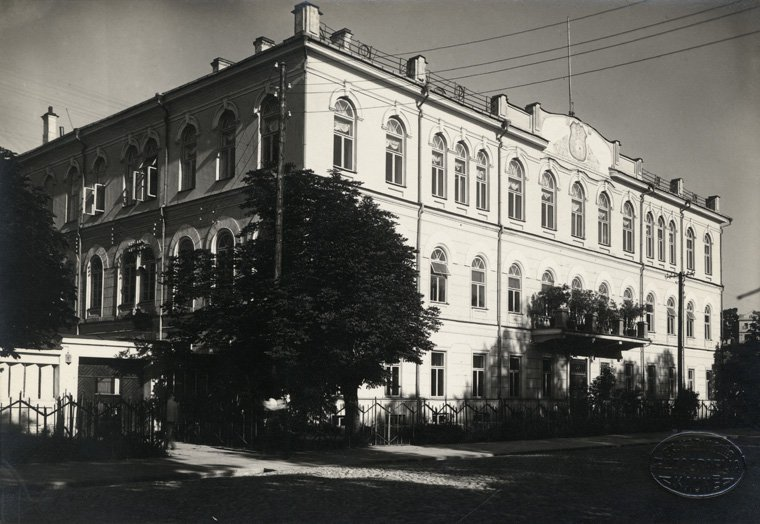
The location of the Constituent Assembly of Lithuania in Kaunas (interwar period)

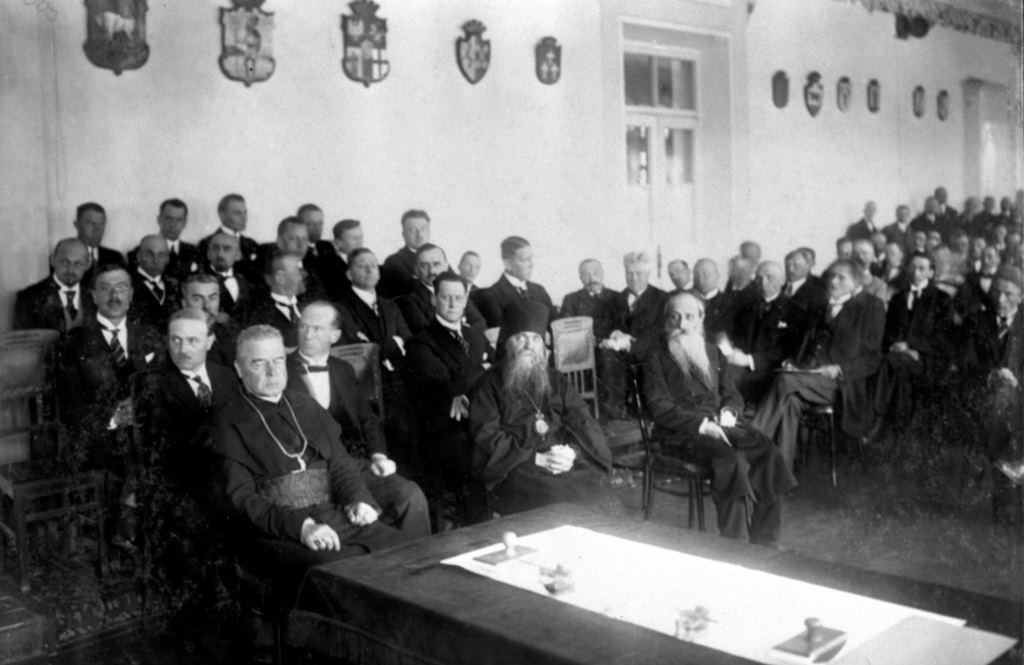
The Second Seimas in 1923

The first widely elected body in Lithuania after the declaration of independence on February 16, 1918, was the Constituent Assembly of Lithuania. The election was held on April 14–15, 1920. The voter turnout reached about 90%.

The primary role of the Constituent Assembly was to adopt the Constitution of Lithuania, which was accomplished on August 1, 1922. The new constitution gave broad powers to the parliament, the Seimas, elected to a three-year term. Seimas would select the Cabinet of Ministers and elect the President. In addition, the Constituent Assembly adopted numerous laws, including a broad land reform and introduced Litas as the national currency.

The First Seimas of Lithuania was the first parliament of Lithuania elected in accordance with the constitution of 1922. The election took place on October 10–11, 1922. However, no party was able to form a sustainable coalition and the Seimas was dissolved on March 12, 1923. New elections were held on May 12 and May 13.

The Second Seimas of Lithuania was the only regular interwar Seimas which completed its full three-year term. The Christian Democrats gained two additional seats which were enough to give them a slim majority. The Seimas continued the land reform, expanded the network of primary and secondary schools and introduced a system of social support. However, it did not bring political stability, as it saw several short-lived governments.

The Third Seimas of Lithuania was elected on May 8–10, 1926, with the Christian Democrats in opposition for the first time. The Lithuanian Popular Peasants' Union and Social Democrats formed a coalition government which lifted martial law, restored democratic freedoms, and declared broad amnesty to political prisoners. However, the government was sharply criticized following some unpopular decisions. The Seimas was interrupted by 1926 Lithuanian coup d'état in December, when the democratically elected government was replaced with the authoritarian rule of Antanas Smetona. The Third Seimas was dissolved on March 12, 1927 and new elections were not called until 1936.

The Fourth Seimas of Lithuania was elected on 9 and 10 June 1936. Elections took place under the constitution of 1928, which had been proclaimed by president Smetona without the assent of the Seimas. The parliament was elected to a five-year term. With opposition parties effectively barred from participating, Lithuanian Nationalists Union got 42 (of 49) seats, with the remaining seven seats taken by the Young Lithuania, a youth branch of the Nationalists Union. The primary task of the new Seimas was to adopt a new constitution, which was accomplished on 11 February 1938. The new constitution provided for even more powers to the president.

After the Soviet ultimatum in June 1940 and subsequent occupation, the Fourth Seimas was dismissed and a puppet People's Seimas was elected in a heavily rigged elections, in order to give legal sanction to the occupation and annexation of Lithuania by the Soviet Union. The new parliament proclaimed the Lithuanian Soviet Socialist Republic, petitioned for admission to the Soviet Union (a petition that was accepted on August 3, 1940), adopted a new constitution and renamed itself to the Supreme Soviet of the Lithuanian SSR, a rubber stamp legislature.

Parliament	Seats	Term	Prime ministers
Constituent Assembly	150	1920–1922	Kazys Grinius
First Seimas	78	1922–1923	Ernestas Galvanauskas
Second Seimas	78	1923–1926	Ernestas Galvanauskas, Antanas Tumėnas, Vytautas Petrulis, Leonas Bistras
Third Seimas	85	1926–1927	Mykolas Sleževičius, Augustinas Voldemaras
Fourth Seimas	49	1936–1940	Juozas Tūbelis, Vladas Mironas, Jonas Černius, Antanas Merkys

=== Since 1990 ===
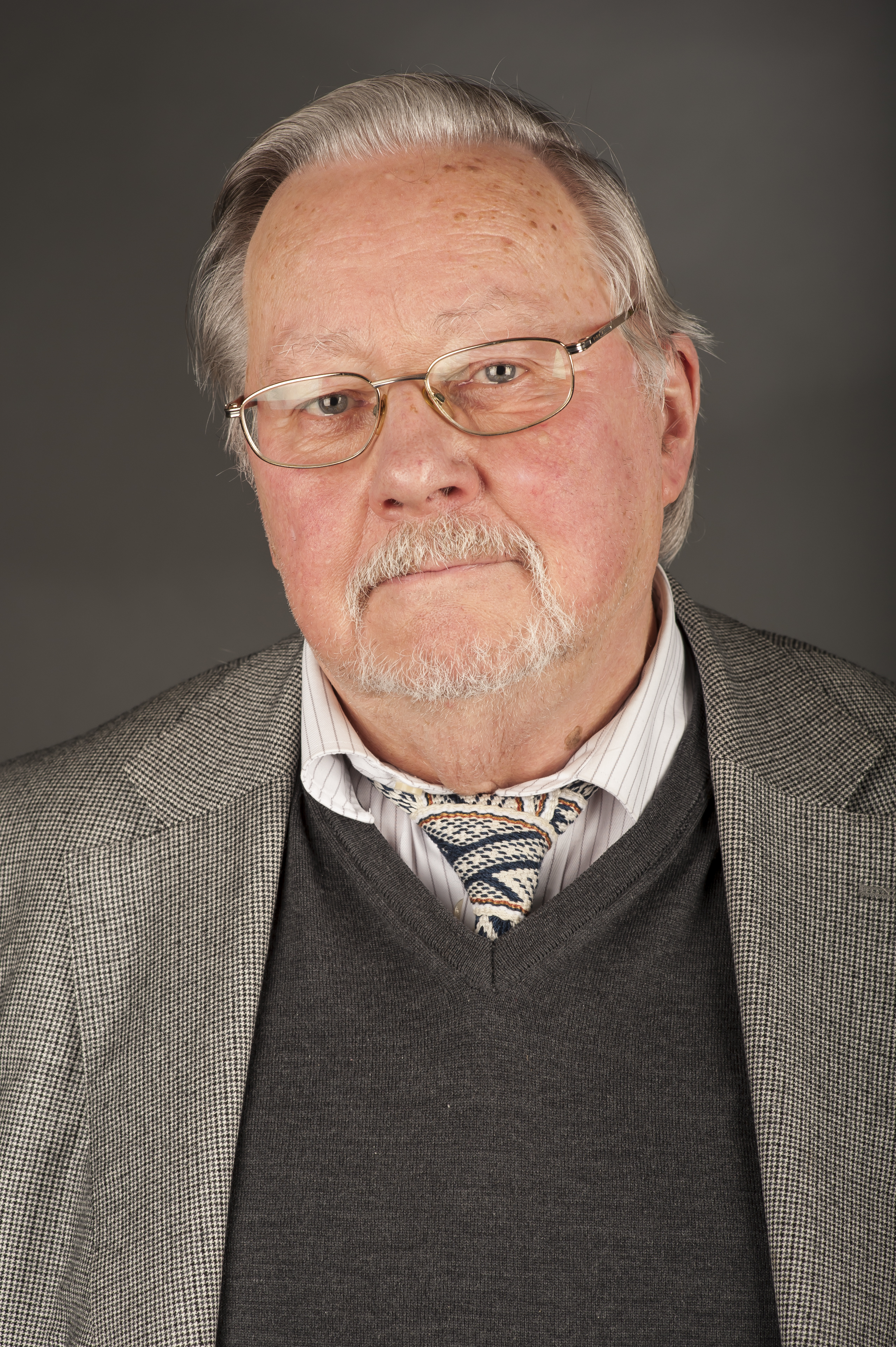
Vytautas Landsbergis was the Chairman of the Supreme Council of Lithuania

On March 11, 1990, the Supreme Council of the Lithuanian SSR proclaimed the independence of Lithuania from the Soviet Union, renaming itself the Supreme Council of the Republic of Lithuania (also called Supreme Council – Reconstituent Seimas, and regarded as the Fifth Seimas). The council adopted the Provisional Basic Law that served as a temporary constitution and worked on the Constitution of Lithuania that was submitted and approved by voters in a referendum on October 25, 1992.

Seven elections of the Seimas have since taken place under the constitution.

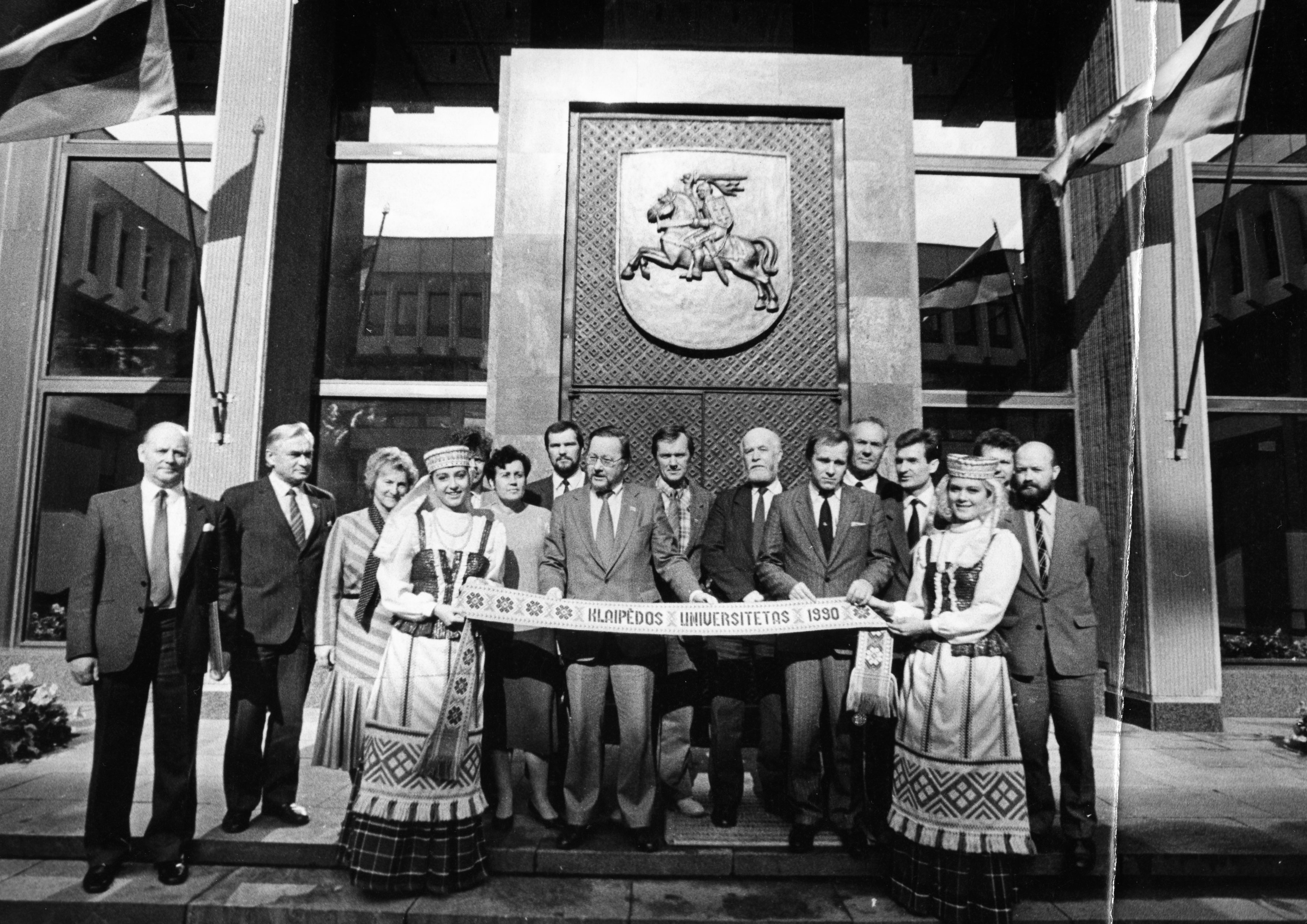
Vytautas Landsbergis near the primary doors of the Seimas Palace with the recently added Vytis above them, in 1990.

The first election in independent Lithuania was held on October 25, 1992, with a run-off on November 15. The election was won by the (ex-communist) Democratic Labor Party of Lithuania, which gained 73 of the 141 seats in the Sixth Seimas. Algirdas Brazauskas was elected the first speaker of the Seimas on November 25, 1992, becoming the acting President on the same day. Česlovas Juršėnas then became the acting (and later permanent) Speaker of the Seimas. The period was plagued by poor economic situation and financial scandals, including one involving former Prime Minister Adolfas Šleževičius.

The election to the Seventh Seimas was held on October 20, 1996 with the run-off on November 10. The election was won by the Homeland Union – Lithuanian Conservative Party, which gained 70 seats and formed a coalition with the Lithuanian Christian Democratic Party (16 seats). Later part of the term of the Seimas was again characterized by an economic crisis, brought about by the 1998 Russian financial crisis. In addition, several high-profile privatizations were undertaken, including that of Mazeikiu Nafta oil refinery. Vytautas Landsbergis served as the Speaker of the Seimas during the term.

The Eighth Seimas was elected on October 8, 2000. Liberal Union of Lithuania won the most seats of any party in the election, with 33, forming the government with New Union (Social Liberals) (its leader, Artūras Paulauskas becoming the Speaker of the Seimas), Lithuanian Centre Union and the Modern Christian Democrats. The coalition was short-lived and Algirdas Brazauskas, a social democrat, became the prime minister less than a year later. This term of the Seimas saw Lithuania fulfilling its long-term foreign policy goals of joining NATO and the European Union. Speaker of the Seimas Artūras Paulauskas also served for two months in 2004 as the Acting President of Lithuania after the impeachement of Rolandas Paksas and before the new election took place.

The Social Democrats remained at the helm of the government after the 2004 parliamentary election, which was held on October 10, with the run-off on October 24. The party was the third-largest in the Ninth Seimas after the election with 20 seats, behind Labour Party with 39 and Homeland Union (Lithuanian Conservatives) with 25, but managed to govern together with New Union (Social Liberals) (11 seats), the Labour Party and the support of other parties. It was the first time since independence that a ruling government survived an election. Artūras Paulauskas was reelected as the Speaker of the Seimas, but was replaced by Viktoras Muntianas in 2006. In 2006, the Labour Party left the coalition when its leader was removed from the post of Minister of Economy and the Social Democrats formed a coalition with the Civil Democracy Party, the Peasants and People's Party, and the Liberal and Centre Union, although the coalition had to rule in a minority and relied on support of opposition parties. New Union (Social Liberals) later rejoined the coalition in early 2008. Česlovas Juršėnas once again became the Speaker of the Seimas in April 2008.

The Tenth Seimas was elected on October 12, 2008, with a run-off on October 26. Homeland Union became the largest party with 45 seats, forming a coalition with populist and short-lived National Resurrection Party (16 seats), Liberal Movement (11 seats) and Liberal and Centre Union (8 seats). Arūnas Valinskas of the National Resurrection Party was elected the Speaker of the Seimas. Ten months later, on September 17, 2009, he was replaced by Irena Degutienė of the Homeland Union, who became the first female Speaker of the Seimas. The term of the Tenth Seimas was plagued a severe economic crisis and the bust of the housing bubble. The Seimas and the Government responded with a wide-ranging and much-criticized tax reform and severe austerity, bringing about wide dissatisfaction and protests.

As a result of widespread dissatisfaction with the ruling coalition, the ruling parties fared poorly in the 2012 parliamentary election. The Social Democrats became the largest party in the Eleventh Seimas, with 38 seats, forming a government coalition with Labour Party (19 seats), Order and Justice (11 seats) and Electoral Action of Poles in Lithuania (8 seats). Electoral Action of Poles in Lithuania withdrawn from the coalition in 2014.

Elections in 2016 resulted in a smaller shift of power. Lithuanian Farmers and Greens Union, a minor party in the preceding parliament, won a sweeping victory, securing 54 seats in the Twelfth Seimas (eventually rising to 59 as they were joined by several independents). The Social Democrats lost a lot of their support and finished with 17 seats (they were joined in the Seimas by the two members of Labour Party), but remained as a junior partner in the ruling coalition with Peasants and Greens Union. By 2019, the coalition included two other parties (Electoral Action of Poles in Lithuania and Order and Justice), but the latter was expelled in the same year.

The Thirteenth Seimas was elected in two rounds on 11 and 25 October 2020 and resulted in an upheaval of the government. The previously dominant Farmers and Greens Union lost much of their support, finishing in second place with 32 seats, and entering the opposition along with their previous partners. The Homeland Union finished first with 50 seats and formed a centre-right coalition government with the Liberal Movement (13 seats) and the newly formed Freedom Party (11 seats).

Elections in 2024, held on 13 and 27 October 2024 to determine the composition of the Fourteenth Seimas, again resulted in an overturning of the government. The previously dominant Homeland Union finished in second place with 28 seats and entered the opposition along with their previous partners. The Lithuanian Social Democratic Party finished first with 52 seats and formed a centre-left coalition with two newly formed parties: the Union of Democrats "For Lithuania" (14 seats) and Dawn of Nemunas (20 seats). The inclusion of Dawn of Nemunas in the ruling coalition sparked local and international backlash due to past anti-Semitic statements made by the party's founder.

== Parliamentary mandate ==
The Seimas of the Republic of Lithuania exercises legislative power in Lithuania. The powers of the Seimas are defined by the Constitution and the laws of Lithuania.

The primary function of the Seimas is to consider, adopt and issue laws and amendments to the Constitution. The Seimas also approves the state budget proposed by the Government, supervises its implementation, and sets state taxation. In foreign relations, the Seimas ratifies international treaties.

Decisions of the Seimas are taken in open simple majority votes. In some cases prescribed by law, a secret ballot is held, for example in expressing no-confidence in the government. Constitutional laws are adopted by the Seimas in a majority vote and can be changed only by a 3/5 majority vote. The list of constitutional laws needs to be approved in a 3/5 majority vote. Changes to the Constitution itself need to be approved in two votes separated by no less than three months, by a 2/3 majority. Changes to international borders of Lithuania need to be approved by 4/5 of the members of the Seimas.

The Seimas approves or rejects the candidate for the Prime Minister nominated by the President. The Seimas must also give its assent to the newly formed Government and its programme before the Government can start their work. The Government remains accountable to the Seimas for its activities. If the Seimas expresses no-confidence in the Prime Minister or the Government as a whole, the Government must resign and can ask the president to call an early election.

Members of Seimas have legal immunity and cannot be arrested or detained without the consent of the vote of Seimas.

The Seimas appoints and dismisses justices and presidents of the Constitutional Court, the Supreme Court and the Court of Appeals, proposed by the President. In its legislative capacity, the Seimas also sets the basis for a judiciary institution advising and, to some extent, binding the President in appointing, promoting or dismissing other judges.

The Seimas also establishes and disestablishes ministries of the Government, establishes state awards, can declare martial law and emergencies, start mobilization and introduce direct local rule on municipalities.

== Elections ==
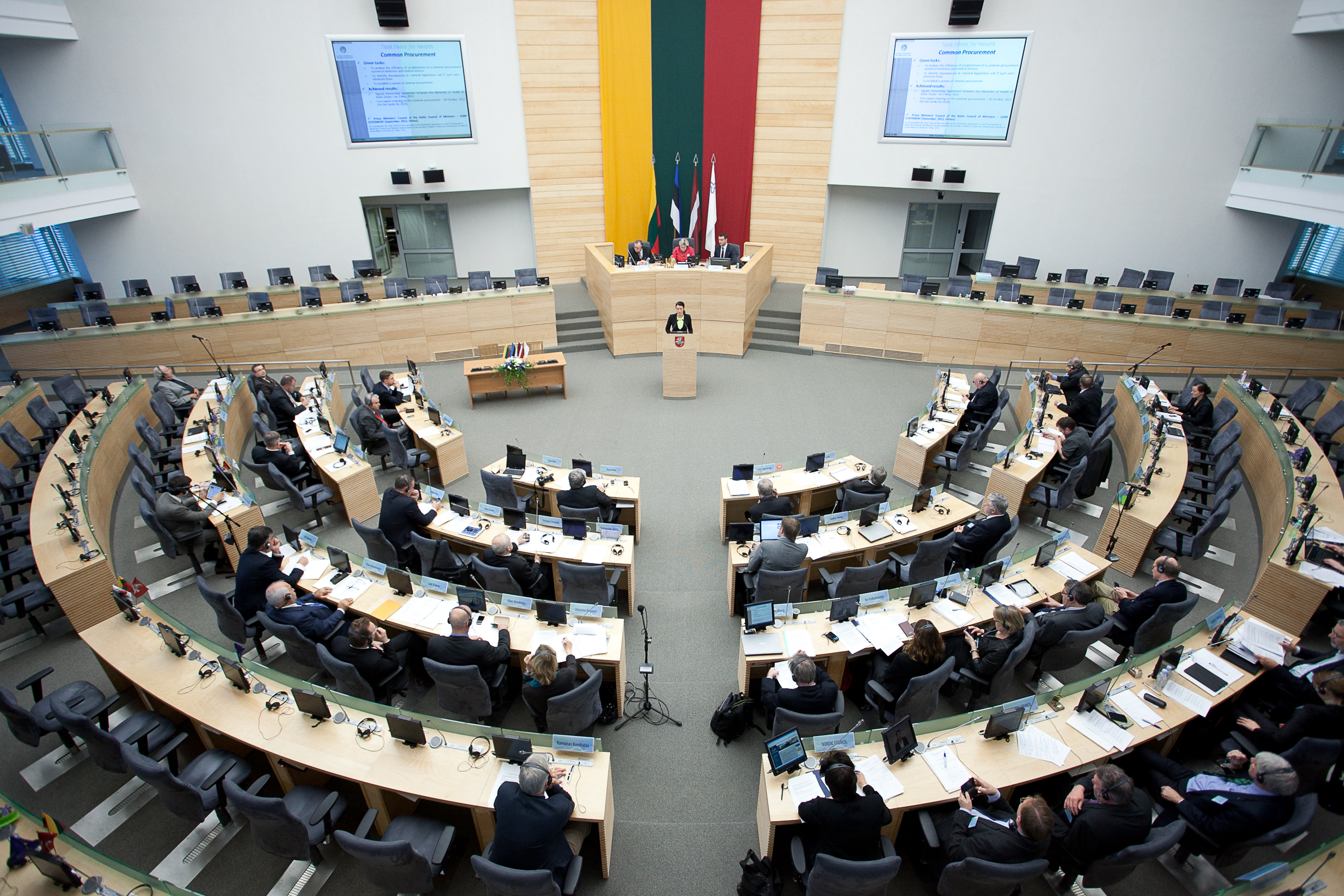
Session hall

=== Electoral process ===
The Seimas has 141 members, elected to a four-year term in parallel voting, with 71 members elected in single-seat constituencies and 70 members elected by proportional representation. Ordinary elections to the Seimas take place on the second Sunday of October, with the voting open for all citizens of Lithuania who are at least 18 years old.

Members of Parliament in the 71 single-seat constituencies are elected in a majority vote, with a run-off held within 15 days, if necessary. The remaining 70 seats are allocated to the participating political parties using the largest remainder method. Parties normally need to receive at least 5% (7% for multi-party electoral lists) of the votes to be eligible for a seat. Candidates take the seats allocated to their parties based on the preference lists submitted before the election and adjusted by preference votes given by the voters.

By-elections occur when a member of the Seimas who was elected in a single-member constituency dies, resigns, or is impeached. The 2026 Nalšios Šiaurinės district by-election will happen on November 8, 2026, triggered after the death of MP Jevgenijus Šuklinas.

=== Latest election ===
Parliamentary elections were held in Lithuania on 13 and 27 October 2024 to elect the 141 members of the Seimas. Members were elected in 71 single-member constituencies using the two-round system, and the remaining 70 in a single nationwide constituency using proportional representation. The first round was held on 13 October and the second round on 27 October.

The elections were won by the Social Democratic Party of Lithuania (LSDP), which secured 19.32% of the popular vote and 52 seats, up from 9.58% and 13 seats in the previous elections in 2020. The Homeland Union (TS–LKD), the largest party in the ruling centre-right coalition in the preceding Seimas, finished a distant second, securing 28 seats, down from its previous 50.

Following the first round of the election, the Social Democrats entered into coalition talks with the Lithuanian Farmers and Greens Union (LVŽS) and the Union of Democrats "For Lithuania" (DSVL), which had split from the latter. After the second round, the consultations were expanded to include the Liberals' Movement (LS), which had been part of the outgoing conservative-led coalition, and Dawn of Nemunas (PPNA), a new nationalist party that finished in third place overall.

The LSDP eventually reached a deal with DSVL and PPNA to form a coalition government. The Social Democrats' decision to include the Dawn of Nemunas party, whose founder is known for making controversial statements, prompted domestic and international backlash.

=== Previous elections ===
Nine elections of the Seimas have been held in Lithuania since independence in 1990.

Democratic Labor Party of Lithuania won the absolute majority of seats in the first election in 1992, the only time it has been achieved in independent Lithuania as of 2015. The party suffered electoral setback in 1996, but remained a major electoral force in the election of 2000 (in cooperation with Social Democratic Party of Lithuania), allowing it to form the government in 2001. The two parties merged in 2001 under the banner of Social Democratic Party of Lithuania and formed the government after the elections of 2004, 2012, and 2024. The Social Democratic Party also participated in the government as a junior partner after the elections of 2016.

Sąjūdis, which had led Lithuania into independence, finished distant second in 1992. Its right wing formed the Homeland Union, a conservative party which won the election in 1996, gaining 70 seats and governing with the Lithuanian Christian Democratic Party. The two parties merged in 2008 under the banner of Homeland Union, winning the election in the same year with 45 seats. The Homeland Union returned to power following its victory in the 2020 election.

Other parties that have gained at least 10 seats in any election to the Seimas are:

- Centre Union of Lithuania (part of the ruling coalition between 1996 and 1999, later merged with the Liberal Union of Lithuania to form the Liberal and Centre Union)
- New Union (Social Liberals) (part of the ruling coalition between 2001 and 2008, later merged with the Labour Party)
- Liberal Union of Lithuania (part of the ruling coalition between 2000 and 2001, later merged with the Centre Union of Lithuania to form the Liberal and Centre Union)
- Labour Party (part of the ruling coalition between 2004 and 2008, as well as between 2012 and 2016)
- Order and Justice (part of the ruling coalition between 2012 and 2016, as well as a period in 2019, later merged into Freedom and Justice)
- Liberal and Centre Union (part of the ruling coalition between 2008 and 2012, later merged with YES to form the Lithuanian Freedom Union)
- Peasants and New Democratic Party Union (now the Lithuanian Farmers and Greens Union, leading a coalition government from 2016 to 2020)
- National Resurrection Party (part of the ruling coalition between 2008 and 2011, when it merged into the Liberal and Centre Union)
- Liberal Movement (part of the ruling coalition between 2008 and 2012, as well as between 2020 and 2024)
- Dawn of Nemunas (part of the ruling coalition since 2024)
- Union of Democrats "For Lithuania" (part of the ruling coalition since 2024)

Election	Turnout	Largest parties/lists	
Election	Turnout	Name	Seats
1992	75.3%	Democratic Labour Party of Lithuania	73
1992	75.3%	Sąjūdis	30
1992	75.3%	Coalition: Lithuanian Christian Democratic Party, Lithuanian Union of Political Prisoners and Deportees, Lithuanian Democratic Party	18
1996	52.9%	Homeland Union – Lithuanian Conservatives	70
1996	52.9%	Lithuanian Christian Democratic Party	16
1996	52.9%	Democratic Labour Party of Lithuania	12
2000	58.6%	Social-Democratic Coalition of Algirdas Brazauskas	51
2000	58.6%	Liberal Union of Lithuania	33
2000	58.6%	New Union (Social Liberals)	28
2004	46.1%	Labour Party	39
2004	46.1%	Working for Lithuania: Social Democratic Party of Lithuania, New Union (Social Liberals)	31
2004	46.1%	Homeland Union (Lithuanian Conservatives)	25
2008	48.59%	Homeland Union – Lithuanian Christian Democrats	45
2008	48.59%	Social Democratic Party of Lithuania	25
2008	48.59%	National Resurrection Party	16
2012	52.93%	Social Democratic Party of Lithuania	38
2012	52.93%	Homeland Union – Lithuanian Christian Democrats	33
2012	52.93%	Labour Party	29
2016	50.64%	Lithuanian Farmers and Greens Union	54
2016	50.64%	Homeland Union – Lithuanian Christian Democrats	31
2016	50.64%	Social Democratic Party of Lithuania	17
2020	47.54%	Homeland Union – Lithuanian Christian Democrats	50
2020	47.54%	Lithuanian Farmers and Greens Union	32
2020	47.54%	Social Democratic Party of Lithuania; Liberal Movement	13
2024	52.20%	Social Democratic Party of Lithuania	52
2024	52.20%	Homeland Union – Lithuanian Christian Democrats	28
2024	52.20%	Dawn of Nemunas	20

== Historical composition ==
LDDP / LSDP / LRP / NS / NDP / DSVL / DP / LP / LVŽS / LVP / DK / Others / Independent / Vacant / Sąjūdis / LPKTS / LLS / LiCS / LCS / LS / TPP / TS–LKD / LKDP / MKD / LRS / LLRA–KŠS / TT / LTS / PPNA
1992	73 / 8 / 2 / 1 / 30 / 4 / 2 / 14 / 4 / 3
1996	12 / 12 / 1 / 1 / 4 / 4 / 4 / 1 / 1 / 13 / 70 / 16 / 1 / 1
2000	26 / 19 / 28 / 3 / 4 / 4 / 3 / 1 / 33 / 2 / 8 / 2 / 3 / 3 / 2
2004	20 / 11 / 39 / 10 / 6 / 18 / 25 / 2 / 10
2008	25 / 1 / 10 / 3 / 4 / 8 / 11 / 16 / 45 / 3 / 15
2012	38 / 29 / 1 / 7 / 3 / 1 / 10 / 33 / 8 / 11
2016	17 / 2 / 54 / 3 / 4 / 14 / 31 / 8 / 8
2020	13 / 3 / 10 / 11 / 32 / 2 / 4 / 13 / 50 / 3
2024	52 / 14 / 8 / 2 / 2 / 12 / 28 / 3 / 20

== Speaker of the Parliament ==
The sittings of the Seimas are presided over by the Speaker of the Seimas or a Deputy Speaker. The first sitting of the Seimas after an election is opened by the eldest member of the Seimas.

The Speaker of the Seimas represents the Seimas and directs its work. Under the legislative procedure, the Speaker submits the laws adopted by the Seimas to the President and may sign and proclaim the laws that are not signed or returned by the President in due time.

The Speaker of the Seimas may temporarily act as the President or deputise for President in cases where the President is abroad or is incapable to exercise the duties of the office. The Speaker of the Seimas, in such a situation, does not have the full powers of the President.

The Speaker of the Seimas and the Deputy Speakers are responsible to the Seimas for their activities, answering questions submitted by the members of the parliament. Under the Statute of the Seimas, the Speakers of the Seimas suspend membership in their political groups upon election.

Juozas Olekas is the current Speaker of the Seimas.

== Parliamentary operations ==
The operations of the Seimas are primarily governed by the Constitution of Lithuania and the Statute of the Seimas of the Republic of Lithuania.

=== Legislative procedure ===
The right of legislative initiative in the Seimas belongs to the members of the Seimas, the President, and the Government. Citizens of Lithuania can also propose laws and proposals backed by at least 50 000 voters must be considered by the Seimas. The legislative procedure for proposed laws is regulated by the Statute of the Seimas.

All draft laws and proposals submitted to the Seimas, and any changes or supplements to previously submitted proposals must be registered with the Secretariat of the Seimas Sittings. The legal department of the Seimas then reviews the draft law, issuing a conclusion on whether or not the draft is in compliance with existing laws and the technical rules of law-making.

The draft laws are presented to the Seimas, which can vote to commence the procedure of consideration of the draft, postpone it or reject the draft. If the Seimas decides to commence the procedure of consideration, it appoints the principal and additional Committees to consider the draft law.

The Seimas Committees perform thorough analysis of the draft law, present it to interested state institutions and organizations, consult specialists in different fields and hear opinions on the draft. Interested persons can, at this stage, provide proposals and opinions on the draft.

The reports of the principal Committee and any other Committees are heard by the Seimas and a general discussion is held. A vote is taken on the amendments to the draft law, which can be proposed and presented by any person with the right of legislative initiative. Finally, the Seimas votes on whether to approve the draft law confirmed by the Committee together with amendments adopted at a sitting of the Seimas.

The adopted laws are submitted to the President. The President can return the law to the Seimas for additional consideration or sign it. Seimas can, but is not obliged to, take proposals by the President into account and can approve the laws returned by the President in a simple majority vote. If the President does not sign the law returned after additional consideration or neither signs nor returns the law after the initial submission, the Speaker of the Seimas can sign the law. The law comes into effect after being published in the "Official Gazette" ("Valstybės žinios").

=== Plenary sittings ===
The Seimas meets annually in two regular sessions: a spring session (10 March – 30 June) and an autumn session (10 September – 23 December). Extraordinary sessions can be called by the Speaker of the Seimas upon the proposal of at least one third of all members of the Seimas, or, in some cases, by the President.

When the Seimas is in session, there are four plenary sittings of the Seimas per week: two on Tuesday and two on Thursday, which are presided by the Speaker of the Seimas or the Deputy Speaker. As a rule, the sittings of the Seimas are open to the public. The open sittings of the Seimas are also broadcast on cable television and via the internet.

The programmes for the sessions of the Seimas and the draft agendas of sittings are drafted and approved by the Assembly of the Elders, which is made up of the members of the Board of the Seimas and representatives of the parliamentary groups.

=== Board of the Seimas ===
The board of the Seimas consists of the Speaker of the Seimas, the Deputy Speakers, and the leader of the opposition. The Speaker and the Deputy Speakers are elected by the members of the parliament in session.

=== Parliamentary committees ===
Parliamentary committees are elected by the Seimas from among its members. The committees consider draft legislation and can explore and clarify other issues in their area of competence.

The committees are formed during the first session of the newly elected Seimas and can have between 7 and 17 members (with the exception of the Committee on European Affairs, which has at least 15 members). Members are selected based on proportional representation of parliamentary groups. Each committee elects its Chair and Deputy Chair, subject to approval by the Seimas.

Committees of the Seimas
Audit	Budget and Finance
Culture	Economics
Education and Science	Environment Protection
European Affairs	Foreign Affairs
Future	Health Affairs
Human Rights	Legal Affairs
National Security and Defence	Rural Affairs
Social Affairs and Labour	State Administration and Local Authorities

== Seimas Palace ==
The Seimas Palace (Lithuanian: Seimo Rūmai) is the seat of the Seimas. It consists of three buildings in the center of Vilnius, at the end of Gediminas Avenue. The main building (I Seimas Palace) was designed by architects Algimantas Nasvytis and his brother Vytautas Nasvytis as the Palace of the Supreme Soviet of the Lithuanian SSR. Construction, at the site of a former stadium, started in 1976 and was completed in 1980. On March 11, 1990, the Act of the Re-Establishment of the State of Lithuania was proclaimed in the main hall of the building. The hall, now referred to as the Hall of the Act of 11 March, housed the sessions of the Seimas until 2007 and is now used for special occasions. The offices of most of the parliament members are also located in this building.

The two other buildings were built around the same time and were connected to the main building after the independence, as the demand for working space increased. The II Seimas Palace, close to Neris river, originally housed the Ministry of Finance of the Lithuanian SSR. After a renovation finished in 2007, the main chamber of the II Seimas Palace houses the sessions of the Seimas. The building also houses the Chancellery of the Seimas. The III Seimas Palace was originally occupied by the Council of the Center of Labour Unions and is now used by the Committees of the Seimas, also housing the restaurant and other administrative functions.

January events of 1991 are commemorated by fragments of the barricades and memorial signs around the Palace.

== Speakers and prime ministers ==
Parliament	Term	Speaker	Prime minister
Supreme Council – Reconstituent Seimas	1990–1992	Vytautas Landsbergis	Kazimira Prunskienė
Supreme Council – Reconstituent Seimas	1990–1992	Vytautas Landsbergis	Albertas Šimėnas
Supreme Council – Reconstituent Seimas	1990–1992	Vytautas Landsbergis	Gediminas Vagnorius
Supreme Council – Reconstituent Seimas	1990–1992	Vytautas Landsbergis	Aleksandras Abišala
Sixth Seimas	1992–1996	Algirdas Brazauskas	Aleksandras Abišala
Sixth Seimas	1992–1996	Algirdas Brazauskas	Bronislovas Lubys
Sixth Seimas	1992–1996	Česlovas Juršėnas	Bronislovas Lubys
Sixth Seimas	1992–1996	Česlovas Juršėnas	Adolfas Šleževičius
Sixth Seimas	1992–1996	Česlovas Juršėnas	Laurynas Stankevičius
Seventh Seimas	1996–2000	Vytautas Landsbergis	Gediminas Vagnorius
Seventh Seimas	1996–2000	Vytautas Landsbergis	Rolandas Paksas
Seventh Seimas	1996–2000	Vytautas Landsbergis	Andrius Kubilius
Eighth Seimas	2000–2004	Artūras Paulauskas	Rolandas Paksas
Eighth Seimas	2000–2004	Artūras Paulauskas	Algirdas Brazauskas
Ninth Seimas	2004–2008	Artūras Paulauskas	Algirdas Brazauskas
Ninth Seimas	2004–2008	Viktoras Muntianas	Algirdas Brazauskas
Ninth Seimas	2004–2008	Viktoras Muntianas	Gediminas Kirkilas
Ninth Seimas	2004–2008	Česlovas Juršėnas	Gediminas Kirkilas
Tenth Seimas	2008–2012	Arūnas Valinskas	Andrius Kubilius
Tenth Seimas	2008–2012	Irena Degutienė	Andrius Kubilius
Eleventh Seimas	2012–2016	Vydas Gedvilas	Algirdas Butkevičius
Eleventh Seimas	2012–2016	Loreta Graužinienė	Algirdas Butkevičius
Twelfth Seimas	2016–2020	Viktoras Pranckietis	Saulius Skvernelis
Thirteenth Seimas	2020–2024	Viktorija Čmilytė-Nielsen	Ingrida Šimonytė
Fourteenth Seimas	2024–2028	Saulius Skvernelis	Gintautas Paluckas
Fourteenth Seimas	2024–2028	Juozas Olekas	
Fourteenth Seimas	2024–2028	Juozas Olekas	Inga Ruginienė
Fourteenth Seimas	2024–2028	Juozas Olekas	Mindaugas Sinkevičius

== See also ==
- List of speakers of the Seimas
