= Anette Mäletjärv =

Estonian activist (born 1997)

Tallinn City Council, former advisor to the Minister of Health (Estonia)

Personal details
- Born: 10 March 1997 (age 29)
- Party: Social Democratic Party
- Education: Amsterdam University College
- Occupation: activist, councilmember

Anette Mäletjärv (born 10 March 1997) is an Estonian activist. Mäletjärv has been a candidate for both the Riigikogu and the Tallinn City Council with the Social Democratic Party (SDE). Mäletjärv currently sits on the Tallinn City Council as a councilmember. They currently run the Instagram account @heterokringel. They are the co-host of the podcast Homokringel with Helgi Saldo.

They advocated for LGBTQ+ rights and socioeconomic equality in Estonia as a cooperation coordinator with the Estonian LGBT Association until 2022. They were previously an advisor to the Estonian Minister of Health until 2025.

== Early life and education ==
Mäletjärv grew up in Tallinn. They attended the Tallinn French School. While in secondary school in 2010, Mäletjärv competed in track and field. They participated in multiple events, including the 200m, 800m, long jump, high jump, shot put, javelin, and B-class heptathlon.

Mäletjärv completed university in the Netherlands at Amsterdam University College and graduated cum laude with a Bachelor of Arts (Honours) degree in Social Sciences, specialising in Sociology and International Relations in 2016. During this time, Mäletjärv worked as a research and teaching assistant in oral communication and cross-cultural communication and conducted research in migration studies. They reflected on their time in the Netherlands as an example of effective, inclusive activism where young people from highly diverse academic backgrounds united around climate activism.

Mäletjärv returned to Estonia in 2018 after completing their university studies in Amsterdam. Upon returning to Estonia, Mäletjärv began interning with the Estonian LGBT Association, becoming involved with the community and activism. Subsequently, Mäletjärv began working as a climate, civic, and human rights activist.

In November 2021, Mäletjärv became a cooperation officer for the Estonian LGBT Association (Eesti LGBT Ühing). In this capacity, their primary objective was establishing, funding, and empowering a nationwide network of queer activists. In the role, Mäletjärv worked with organisations in Estonia as well as the international organisations ILGA and Transgender Europe. Mäletjärv has been involved managing projects aimed at building networks for regional activists.

In 2022, Mäletjärv served as the lead organiser for the Tartu Pride festival.

== Activism ==
Mäletjärv frequently appears in Estonian media to discuss LGBTQ+ rights and systemic discrimination. They have publicly addressed the rising trend of physical attacks and bullying against the LGBT+ community. Mäletjärv has spoken about the psychological toll of online harassment and how internet hate speech and trolling can translate into real-world hostility. They argue that active civic engagement is required to combat inequalities.

Mäletjärv manages the Instagram account @heterokringel. The account is known for its memes. The content of the account has been described as a combination of political activism and humor. In 2021, it had a reported 3,500 followers.

Mäletjärv is also co-creator of the podcast Homokringel. alongside co-host Helgi Saldo.

=== Commentary on the protests for the Civil Partnership Act in Estonia (2014) ===
Mäletjärv became involved with the debates around the Civil Partnership Act in Estonia, which intensified in 2014. During these debates on 5 October 2014, Mäletjärv delivered a brief interview on ERR that was featured on the national television broadcast Aktuaalne kaamera regarding ongoing protests and counter-protests. Mäletjärv received positive public feedback following the statement they gave, with viewers reaching out to let them know that the coverage provided them with a sense of optimism. Mäletjärv attributes the positive responses they received as one of the motivating factors that led them to pursue further LGBT activism.

=== Commentary on hate speech (2021) ===
In September 2021, Mäletjärv appeared on the Kanal 2 television programme ESSE hosted by Eeva Esse-Sõõrumaa to discuss the relationship between online hate speech and real-world violence. Speaking as an advocate for the LGBT+ community, they suggested that the normalisation of hostile internet commentary may lead directly to physical hate crimes, noting their own experience of a physical assault. They also discussed the psychological distress that hostile political discourse can cause for those from minority groups. During the episode, Mäletjärv shared that they had been the victim of a physical attack, an experience they directly linked to the broader normalization of aggressive language and hate speech in public discourse. They noted that high-profile political events, such as the announcement of specific coalition-building efforts, could trigger acute personal distress and anxiety. Their perspective on the program emphasized that unchecked, hostile statements in digital spaces may serve as precursors to real-world violence.

=== Commentary on queer community in the Baltics (2022) ===
In 2022, NBC News featured commentary from Mäletjärv on the experiences of the Balitc LGBTQ+ community during the Baltic Pride march in Vilnius, Lithuania. The article focused on the Baltic states of Lithuania, Latvia, and Estonia (with Mäletjärv commenting on the environment in Estonia) in as advocates sought for greater legal protections and societal acceptance for the queer community. The report discussed the atmosphere of the Baltic Pride march in Vilnius and how activists are balancing the push for civil unions and legislative change against the influence of conservative institutions and the ongoing regional anxiety over Russian influence in the region.

=== Commentary on media (2023–2024) ===
In 2023, Mäletjärv's Heterokringel account gained public attention and was cited by Estonian media, Eesti Ekspress, for discussing the omission of a lesbian kiss from a public broadcast. Mäletjärv discussed the edit of a campaign for Orbit gum, which featured a scene depicting a same-sex kiss. The original, complete version of the commercial was broadcast in several European markets. However, when the advertisement was aired in Estonia, the footage containing the kiss was removed, resulting in a truncated version of the commercial for the local audience. Mäletjärv compared the local edit with versions aired in other markets, such as Finland and Albania. The incident was used as an example in a critique of homophobic editorial practices.

In October 2024, Mäletjärv's Heterokringel account was in the news for highlighting a social media post by reality television personality and social media influencer Seidi Voogre regarding the Netflix series Monsters: The Lyle and Erik Menendez Story. Voogre had criticised the inclusion of what she described as "some gay nonsense" ("mingi gei-jama") in the series while complaining to her followers that the show did not accurately portray the real-life case. Voogre felt the creators had unnecessarily inserted a gay storyline into the narrative by showing a heavily romanticised depiction of incestuous trauma between the brothers in the show. Mäletjärv publicly corrected Voogre, pointing out that the controversial element in the show wasn't "gay nonsense" and flagged Voogre's phrasing as exclusionary and derogatory. Voogre replied online and apologised, saying she had expressed herself poorly, and she was a massive true crime fan who was simply annoyed by historical inaccuracies. She insisted that she "obviously wouldn't suddenly be openly homophobic." Voogre clarified that her criticism was directed at the depiction of incest between brothers rather than the show's queer content, a clarification Mäletjärv subsequently accepted.

== Political career ==
Mäletjärv has run for office under the Social Democratic Party (SDE) both for the Riigikogu and the Tallinn City Council elections.

=== Campaigns and election results ===
==== 2021 Tallinn municipal elections ====
Mäletjärv formally stepped into politics in 2021. In May 2021, against the backdrop of the COVID-19 pandemic in Estonia, Mäletjärv announced their candidacy with the Social Democratic Party in the Tallinn municipal elections.. Drawing on the political climate of the early 2020s, Mäletjärv also highlighted in the campaign how dependent citizens are on government policies, with issues such as LGBT+ rights and the climate crisis being practical realities that can be addressed with legislative intervention. Mäletjärv ran in District No. 2 (Kesklinn/City Centre).

Mäletjärv received 406 votes, placing them third on the party's open district list, behind Riina Sikkut and Maris Hellrand. Although they placed well, Mäletjärv did not secure an immediate mandate to the City Council during the 2021 election cycle.

==== 2023 Estonian parliamentary election ====
During the 2023 Estonian parliamentary election, Mäletjärv stood as a candidate for the Social Democratic Party. Mäletjärv received a total of 553 votes as a candidate in Electoral District No. 2 (Kesklinn, Lasnamäe, and Pirita) during the 2023 Riigikogu elections. The majority of their support came from e-votes. They ranked third among the party's candidates in that constituency. They brought in major support from the Tallinn sub-district, outperforming several well-known, established local politicians on the Social Democrat roster. However, this total fell 21 votes short of the required district quota to secure a seat in the Riigikogu.

In 2023, the Tallinna Saksa Gümnaasium hosted a student-led election debate. Organisers included Mäletjärv among the panellists, along with other young representatives from various Estonian political parties, to engage students as part of the social studies curriculum. The debate, which was moderated by students from the school's 12th grade, emphasised the importance of civic participation and encouraging young people to take an active role in shaping the future of Estonia.

==== 2025 Tallinn municipal elections ====
In 2025, Mäletjärv stood as a candidate in the Tallinn City Council election.

They secured 536 votes in their district. With 84.5% of Mäletjärv's constituency voting online.

Mäletjärv elected to suspend their council mandate prior to the initial legislative session until 7 May 2026. The suspension was necessary because Mäletjärv was appointed to serve as an advisor to the Minister of Health. Under Estonian law, holding an active legislative seat on a municipal council is legally incompatible with certain public service employments at the national executive level, such as being a political advisor within a ministry. Mäletjärv suspended the seat, and the party appointed a substitute member, child psychiatrist Anne Kleinberg.

=== Summary of election results ===
Election Cycle	Election Level / District	Total Votes	Voting Format	Outcome
2021 Municipal	Tallinn (District No. 2 - Kesklinn / City Centre)	406	They placed third on their party's open district list, trailing behind Riina Sikkut and Maris Hellrand. Did not secure a mandate.	Lost
2023 Parliamentary	Riigikogu (District No. 2 - Kesklinn, Lasnamäe, Pirita)	553	78.4% of their total votes came from digital voting (434 e-votes vs. 119 paper ballots). Did not enter parliament.	Lost
2025 Municipal	Tallinn (District No. 2 - Kesklinn / City Centre)	536	84.5% of their votes came from digital votes (453 e-votes vs. 83 paper ballots). Secured a mandate. Postponed holding their seat due to holding an advisory role to Minister of Health. Served as a councilmember on the Tallinn City Council from May 2026.	Won

In their advisory role to the Minister of Health Riina Sikkut they made 2400 euros as their salary.

=== Political positions held ===
==== Role in the XI session (2025–2029) of the Tallinn City Council ====
While on the Tallinn City Council in 2026, Mäletjärv voted in favour of establishing a temporary commission to investigate Russian Federation influence activities in Tallinn and supported a motion of no confidence against Mayor Peeter Raudsepp. Within the scope of urban planning and real estate, Mäletjärv generally supported city-led development projects and infrastructure leases for educational and cultural institutions. However, Mäletjärv voted against the lease of the building at Kaera 21 to the International Union of National Cultural Associations Lüüra. Mäletjärv supported city budgetary measures, including the 2026 supplementary budget, and initiatives aimed at increasing access to municipal institutions, such as proposals for free museum admission for youth and reforms to public transport validation. They were considered to be 93% of council members for voting turnout.

Mäletjärv's campaign challenged youth political apathy. Their platform focused heavily on protecting queer and transgender youth, creating a sustainable, safe night culture in Tallinn, and growing capacity for environmental and climate resilience in urban planning. During the campaign, they shared that political apathy among youth often stems from societal privilege and an apprehension toward ideological labelling. They also recounted an interaction with an acquaintance who made a blatant homophobic joke in their presence that when confronted, excused the behaviour by claiming to have "no political views." Mäletjärv became known speaking about youth who avoid taking a political stance out of a fear of conflict and called it out as its own form of privilege. Mäletjärv hypothesized that young people possessing systemic advantages (such as being wealthy, heterosexual, Estonian-speaking, or non-disabled) frequently disengage from politics because they lack personal experience with discrimination or economic hardship. Mäletjärv advocated during the campaign that youth should demonstrate solidarity with marginalised communities through political activism.

In 2026, Mäletjärv announced the establishment of an LGBT+ support group within the Tallinn City Council. This group reportedly brought together 20 council members, including the entire Social Democratic Party faction alongside members of the Estonian Reform Party. Following the announcement of the council support group, a critic accused Mäletjärv and the LGBT+ community of brainwashing children and causing public division, which was reported by conservative media. Mäletjärv responded to the criticism by stating their belief that Tallinn should be a city where children with same-sex parents do not face bullying.

=== Summary of political positions held ===
The following is a list of committee positions Mäletjärv has held on the Tallinn City council:

Committee	Status	Start	End
The 10th composition of the City Council of the City Centre	Member	12.11.2021	01.06.2023
Education Committee	Member	15.02.2022	27.11.2025
Public Order and Environment Committee	Member	15.02.2022	13.06.2023
11th composition of the City Council	Member	26.11.2025	
The 11th composition of the City Council of the City Centre	Member	28.11.2025	
Social Democratic Party Faction	Member	14.05.2026	
Social and Health Committee	Member	28.05.2026	
LGBT+ support group	Chairman	29.05.2026	

== Personal life ==
Mäletjärv identifies as queer and non-binary. Mäletjärv identified privately as a lesbian at the age of 14. Mäletjärv was concerned about potential bullying due to the prevalence of homophobic remarks among their classmates, which made it difficult for Mäletjärv to come out to others about their sexual orientation. Because of this, Mäletjärv didn't come out publicly until age 17.

Mäletjärv has attributed their apprehension around coming out to homophobia within Estonian society. They noted that people in Estonia often fear speaking about their identity, and that Estonian culture has been slow to shift away from norms held during the Soviet era, in which people could be imprisoned for being gay. Mäletjärv stated that the "so-called 'gay issue' is not some abstract ideology or political opinion, but simply my life and everyday reality." They have discussed their frustration with their own LGBT+ identity being treated as a controversial political topic.
