= Mindaugas Murza =

Lithuanian politician (born 1973)

Mindaugas Gervaldas (né Murza; born 16 December 1973) is a Lithuanian radical nationalist and a Neo-Nazi. He was a member of the Lithuanian National Defence Volunteer Forces. He has been a member, founder, and chairman of several different Neo-Nazi political parties. Only one party, the National Democratic Party of Lithuania, was officially registered and participated in the 2003 municipal elections. Murza and three others were elected to the council of the Šiauliai City Municipality.

== Political ventures ==
In 1993, members of the Lithuanian National Defence Volunteer Forces (SKAT) founded the underground Lithuanian National Independence Union (Lithuanian: Lietuvių nacionalinės nepriklausomybės sajunga or LNNS). Murza, then a SKAT sergeant, became leader of LNNS in December 1993. The organization established a combat group and sought to collect weapons for about 30 men who would be "efficient fighters" and "not afraid to die". Murza's home was searched in 1995 and in February 1996 he was sentenced to 18 months of correctional labor without imprisonment for illegal possession of small-caliber ammunition.

In November 1996, Murza became chairman of the newly established Lithuanian Alliance of Nationalist-Socialist Unity (Lietuvių nacionalsocialinės vienybės sąjunga or LNSVS). It was the first Neo-Nazi organization in Lithuania. In 1998, Murza and other members of LNSVS in their publication, Voice of the Nation (Nacijos balsas), attacked Lithuania's minorities of Jews, Poles and Russians, and demanded that conditions for these minorities be made so unbearable that they leave Lithuania. In total, 17 issues of Voice of the Nation were published. LNSVS attempted to register as a political party twice and as a non-governmental organization ten times, but was rejected by the Ministry of Justice due to its propagation of hate. In October 1999, LNSVS was reorganized into the Lithuanian National Labor Union (Lietuvių tautinio darbo sąjunga or LTDS). It was officially registered not as a political party but as a non-governmental organization.

Murza continued to search for ways to legalize his political activities. In May 2000, Murza became chairman of the newly established Lithuanian National Socialist Party (Lietuvių nacionalsocialinė partija or LNSP). In 2001, he attempted to revive the moribund Life Logic Party of Lithuania (Gyvenimo logikos partija) when the registration for LNSP was refused. In May 2001, LNSP merged into the legal National Democratic Party of Lithuania (Lietuvos nacionaldemokratų partija or LNDP) then chaired by Kazimieras Uoka. It was a moderately nationalist party with no great political prospects that was the first to adopt Euroscepticism as its platform. Murza became chairman of LNSP. Murza and three other members of LNSP were elected to the council of the Šiauliai City Municipality in the 2003 municipal elections. Another member of LNSP was elected to the council of the Alytus City Municipality.

In April 2005, Murza presented plans to establish a new political party, the Unified Lithuanian National Workers Movement (Vieningasis lietuvių nacionaldarbininkų sąjūdis or VLNDS). At the meeting of the new party, Murza made openly anti-Semitic statements calling Jews "the most cruel and crafty enemy of the European race" which led to Lithuanian prosecutors launching an investigation against him for preaching hatred. Murza resigned from LNDP in December 2006 and established VLNDS in February 2007. VLNDS adopted a stylized swastika as its symbol and openly promoted the Neo-Nazi platform – anti-Semitism, anti-immigration, anti-gay rights.

In March 2011, Murza established a new party, the Lithuanian National Union (Lietuvių tautos sąjunga or LITAS). In 2012, Murza officially changed his last name to Gervaldas (from geras [good] and valdyti [to rule]). It describes the new ideal political system that was added to the political program of VLNDS. In 2014, Murza organized a 19-member Public Electoral Committee "Against Corruption" that ran in the municipal elections in the Šiauliai City Municipality and received only 324 votes.

Murza and his supporters organize various small protests. In 2001, he organized a protest against mayor of Šiauliai without a permit. When he refused to pay the fine, his car (Volkswagen Golf) was confiscated by the government. In November 2006, Murza and six others were found guilty of interrupting a religious ceremony when they harassed Jews lighting a menorah in December 2003. Murza was fined 5,000 litas. In 2010, Murza participated in a protest against the Baltic Pride parade in Vilnius.

== Personal life ==
On 19 November 2011, he married Russian citizen Zlata Rapova who claims to be a descendant of Count Jean Rapp, French general during the Napoleonic Wars. The marriage ceremony was conducted according to neo-pagan traditions.
