= Petras Gražulis =

Lithuanian right-wing politician

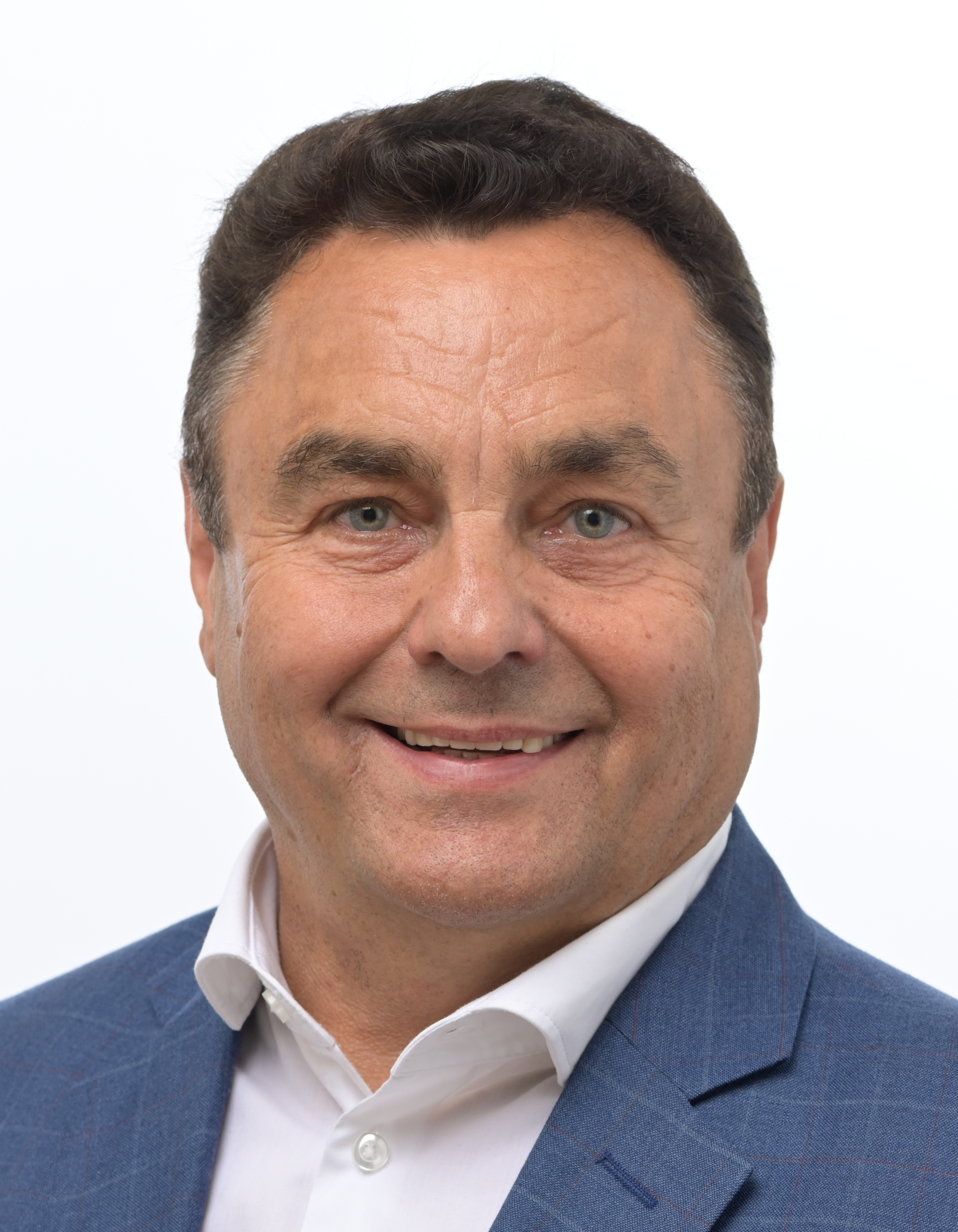
- Official portrait, 2024

Chairman of the People and Justice Union
- In office 29 September 2021 – 8 March 2026
- Preceded by: Naglis Puteikis
- Succeeded by: Rimas Jonas Jankūnas

Member of the European Parliament for Lithuania
- Incumbent
- Assumed office 16 July 2024

Member of the Seimas
- In office 25 November 1996 – 18 December 2023
- Constituency: Multi-member (1996–2000); Gargždai (2000–2016); Multi-member (2016–2020); Gargždai (2020–2023)

Member of the Kaunas City Council
- In office 5 April 1990 – 23 March 1995

Personal details
- Born: 28 October 1958 (age 67) Mankūnai, Alytus, Lithuanian SSR, Soviet Union
- Party: TTS (2021–present)
- Other political affiliations: LKDP (1989–2006); TT (2008–2018); Independent (2006–2008; 2018–2021)
- Spouse: Raminta Gražulienė (m. 1990; div. 2013)
- Children: 4
- Education: Kaunas Polytechnic Institute

Petras Gražulis (born 28 October 1958) is a Lithuanian politician, former Member of the Seimas and current member of the European Parliament. Gražulis is also the incumbent chairman of the right-wing People and Justice Union party. He is known for his political scandals and hardline opposition to LGBT rights.

== Biography ==
Gražulis was born to a family of 15 children in Mankūnai (current day Alytus District Municipality) on 28 October 1958. He joined dissident activity, cooperated with the Committee in the Defense of the Rights of Faithful, an underground organization which fought against persecution of Catholics in the Lithuanian SSR, and distributed the samizdat periodical Chronicle of the Catholic Church in Lithuania. He was also a member of the Lithuanian Helsinki Group.

He participated in the 1987 anti-Soviet protest at the memorial of Adam Mickiewicz. After refusing to serve in repeated military training in the Soviet Army in 1988, he was arrested and imprisoned in Lukiškės Prison.

He was one of the refounding members of the Lithuanian Christian Democratic Party on 10 February 1989 and chairman of the Kaunas branch of the party from 1990 to 1994. He was elected to the municipal council of Kaunas City Municipality in 1990 and remained in office until 1995.

Since 1996, he has been a Member of the Seimas, first elected on the Christian Democratic national list, however, in the 2000 parliamentary election, he was elected in the single-member constituency of Gargždai, where he was reelected in every election until 2016, and again since 2020.

Gražulis was expelled from the Christian Democrats in 2006, as he had ceased being active in the party for the previous few years and began running as an independent candidate. In 2008, he became a member of Order and Justice and was elected as its vice-chairman. His membership in the party was suspended in 2018, after his infidelity scandal and his criticism towards the party's new chairman Remigijus Žemaitaitis. He began establishing his own political party, "For Lithuania, Men!" (Lithuanian: Už Lietuvą, vyrai!), but chose to unify with the Lithuanian Centre Party and the Lithuanian Nationalist and Republican Union, establishing the People and Justice Union, which he was elected chairman of.

On 18 December 2023, Gražulis was impeached by the Seimas for casting a vote for another MP and thus breaking his oath of office.

He was elected an MEP for People and Justice Union.

== Views ==
=== Israel–Hamas war ===
On 30 October 2023, Gražulis submitted a draft resolution to the Seimas that called on an "immediate release of all hostages taken by Hamas", "condemning Israel's excessive military response to recent Palestinian aggression and calls on it [Israel] to cease all hostilities". The Seimas did not agree to include this resolution on its agenda, with 15 parliamentarians voting in favour, 49 against, and 41 abstained.

=== Homosexuality ===
On the first Baltic Pride in 2010, Gražulis and Homeland Union MP Kazimieras Uoka illegally climbed over the fence separating the parade from the public, thus causing confusion, and disobeyed the orders of police officers. He attempted to intervene in the same way in 2013 and was subsequently carried out of the premises by police officers in a bag, shouting "For Lithuania, men!", which became an internet meme.

In 2012, Gražulis interrupted a conference during the International Day Against Homophobia organized by Marija Aušrinė Pavilionienė and the Lithuanian Gay League, during which he equated homosexuality with necrophilia, pedophilia and zoophilia and demanded the expulsion of foreign ambassadors who had attended the conference.

On 2 December 2020, requested to turn on his camera during a long-distance meeting of the Seimas Culture Committee, Gražulis appeared with a half-naked man on screen. He gave contradictory explanations, first claiming that it was his son, then the TV presenter and journalist Andrius Tapinas, which raised rumors about his possible homosexuality.

== Controversies ==
Gražulis is well known in Lithuania due to his political scandals and outspoken homophobia, as well as recognizable mannerisms such as constant appeals to God and opposition to the Homeland Union. He is frequently parodied in Lithuanian media.

Gražulis has been involved in numerous traffic incidents. He hit a passing vehicle in 2012, hit a woman with a child in 2017 and escaped the incident, and was involved in other cases of speeding and car crashes. His driver's license was suspended for one year in 2022, and he had been fined for traffic incidents 13 times during the year.

Gražulis has a long-standing feud with the Homeland Union and claims that it is "the most destructive party in Lithuanian politics". In 2007, during the investigation into the assassination of Juras Abromavičius, he attempted to register a motion in parliament to ban the TS-LKD as a terrorist organization.

In 2022, when the Seimas passed a motion which recognized Vytautas Landsbergis, the chairman of the Supreme Council – Reconstituent Seimas from 1990 to 1992 and the founder of the Homeland Union, as a former head of state, Gražulis registered a motion to give Landsbergis the status of emperor in protest. The motion was voted down.

In 2018, the LNK TV program KK2 revealed that Gražulis had a child outside of marriage with 20-years younger Birutė Navickaitė. In spite of his strong open pro-life position and demands to criminalize abortion in Lithuania, he had insisted Navickaitė to get an abortion. Gražulis accepted that the child was his and asserted that he had not made a hypocritical statement, and was merely acting out of emotion.
