= National Democratic Party of Lithuania =

National Democratic Party of Lithuania Lietuvos nacionaldemokratų partija
- Leader: Žilvinas Razminas
- Founded: 30th of January 1999
- Dissolved: 2009
- Split from: Lithuanian Nationalist and Republican Union
- Merged into: Unified Lithuanian National Workers Movement
- Ideology: Nationalism; Euroscepticism
- Political position: Far-right
- Colours: Gold, Green, Red (Colours of the Lithuanian flag)

Website
- http://www.lndp.lt

National Democratic Party of Lithuania (Lithuanian: Lietuvos nacionaldemokratų partija) was a right-wing, nationalist political party in Lithuania. Its last leader was Žilvinas Razminas.

The party was established on the January 30, 1999 by the former leader of the Lithuanian Nationalist and Republican Union, Rimantas Smetona.

== Platform ==
According to the official founding LNDP program adopted at the LNDP constituent congress of the January 30, 1999, the Lithuanian National Democratic Party's goal is to strengthen and maintain the Lithuanian people and the independent state of Lithuania, and ensure that the state is rich, secure, and equally fair to all its citizens. The party is guided by the principles of national democracy, an ideology it views as a middle way between anarchism, liberalism, and totalitarianism, which it claims are responsible for Lithuania's growing income disparity and cultural and moral decay. The party seeks a pragmatic approach to the Lithuanian economy, seeking to maintain and strengthen a free market that is agricultural, supports small and big businesses alike, is modern and competitive in a globalised economy, and encourages investment whilst also maintaining and implementing measures to ensure Lithuanian control over Lithuanian goods, services, and wealth. The LNDP also seeks to maintain equal opportunities for all by creating favourable opportunities for every citizen, according to his abilities to work, earn, save, and buy, and wants local governments to implement sufficient income to the population's needs for funding. The party, although supporting economical and cross border relations, is also bitterly opposed to the European Union, regarding it as a "Nation State" that threatens the freedom and individualism of the Lithuanian state and other Independent European states.

Rimantas Smetona and Kazimieras Uoka left the party after it was taken over by anti-semite Mindaugas Murza and his followers.

In 2009 the members of the party voted in favour of merging to an ultranationalist Unified Lithuanian National Workers Movement.

== Leaders of the party ==
1. Rimantas Smetona (1999–2001)
2. Kazimieras Uoka (2001–2002)
3. Mindaugas Murza (2002–2007)
4. Žilvinas Razminas (2007-2009)
