= LGBTQ rights in Lithuania =

- Location of Lithuania (dark green) – in Europe (light green & dark grey) – in the European Union (light green) – [Legend]
- Legal status: Legal since 1993, equal age of consent since 2003
- Gender identity: Allowed to change gender
- Military: Gays, lesbians and bisexuals allowed to serve openly
- Discrimination protections: Sexual orientation protections (see below)

Family rights
- Recognition of relationships: Civil Partnerships since 2025
- Restrictions: Same-sex marriage constitutionally banned
- Adoption: Stepchild adoption since 2024

Lesbian, gay, bisexual, and transgender (LGBT) rights in Lithuania have gradually evolved over the years, although LGBT people continue to face legal and societal challenges not experienced by non-LGBT residents. Same-sex sexual activity between consenting adults has been legal since 1993. Marriages are limited to opposite-sex couples only by the 1992 constitution. In April 2025, the Constitutional Court of Lithuania ruled that the absence of legal regulation for partnership institutions, including those applicable to same-sex couples, contradicts the Constitution. The Court emphasized that the state must ensure legal protections for relationships outside marriage, grounded in the principles of human dignity and respect for private and family life.

Negative attitudes against LGBT individuals remain widespread in Lithuanian society. Although tolerance has increased somewhat in urban areas and among younger generations, discrimination and social stigma persist. A GLOBSEC survey conducted in March 2023 found that 22% of Lithuanians supported same-sex marriage, while 60% were opposed and 18% were undecided. Among European Union countries, only Bulgaria showed lower levels of support. Other polls have shown that support for civil unions tends to be higher than support for same-sex marriage.

There are small LGBT communities in Vilnius, Kaunas, Klaipėda, Šiauliai, and Panevėžys. Due to lower population density and prevailing conservative attitudes, smaller towns and rural areas typically lack active LGBT organizations or visible communities.

== Legality of same-sex sexual activity ==
Same-sex sexual activity was illegal in interwar Lithuania and during the occupation of the Soviet Union. It was legalized in Lithuania in 1993, which was two years after the end of the occupation. During the Soviet occupation, homosexuality was considered an undesirable decadence of the bourgeoisie, if acknowledged at all, and the sexual revolution taking place in Western society, considered subversive by the Soviets in its own right, was hindered in this environment by being non-public in nature and by limited access to information. With the new Criminal Code, the age of consent was equalized in 2003, at 14 years of age, in order to fulfil European Union accession criteria against discrimination. On 2 July 2010, the age of consent was raised to 16 years, regardless of gender or sexual orientation.

== Recognition of same-sex relationships ==
There are several provisions banning the registration of same-sex unions in Lithuania. Article 38 of the Lithuanian Constitution states "Marriage shall be concluded upon the free mutual consent of a man and a woman". Same-sex marriage is also explicitly banned under Article 3.12 of the Civil Code of Lithuania, stating that "Marriage shall be concluded with a person of the opposite sex only". Moreover, the country's Civil Code allows the institution of partnerships to be approved by the legislative authorities, although Article 3.229 of the Code restricts them to heterosexual couples. On 17 April 2025, the Constitutional Court ruled that this restriction was unconstitutional and granted same-sex couples the right to register their partnership with the courts until the Seimas adopts a comprehensive law on registered partnerships.

During the census of 2011, only 24 same-sex households were declared.

As of 2019, a bill to allow same-sex couples to receive some limited partnership rights is pending in the Parliament. It was preliminarily approved 46–17 in May 2017.

In January 2019, the Constitutional Court ruled that foreign same-sex spouses must be granted residence permits. The ruling follows a similar ruling in 2018 by the European Court of Justice in Coman and Others.

In May 2021, more than 10,000 people took to the streets in Vilnius to protest against the partnership legislation.

== Adoption and parenting ==
In general, couples must be married to adopt in Lithuania, so subsequently, same-sex couples are not permitted to adopt. Article 3.210 of the Civil Code states, however, that in exceptional cases, single persons may be accepted. In that case, the decision goes to social workers. Nevertheless, the Commission of Family and Child Affairs of the Lithuanian Parliament "expressed a concern if there were enough legal barriers to prevent people of non-traditional orientation to adopt". Specialists have confirmed that barriers are in place, though it is possible to circumvent them. In consequence, the adoption by single homosexuals in practice is not legally possible.

In September 2021, Lithuanian President Gitanas Nauseda said he is against the demands to let homosexuals adopt children, which had been put forward by organizers of the Kaunas Pride march. He told reporters "I am against such demands and I think that they won't be met in Lithuania. As the president, I will do my best so that such demands could not be met at this time." on 2 September.

== Discrimination protections ==
According to the Law on Equal Treatment 2003 (Lithuanian: Lygių galimybių įstatymas), which took effect on 1 January 2005, discrimination on the basis of sexual orientation is banned in the areas of employment, education, and access to goods and services. Article 2(2) reads as follows:

Violation of equal treatment means direct or indirect discrimination on the grounds of age, sexual orientation, disability, racial or ethnic origin, religion or beliefs.

Amendments to the law repealing the protections on the grounds of sexual orientation were under consideration by the Seimas (Lithuania's Parliament) in June 2008, but they were later rejected.

In addition, public instigation of violence against LGBT people and other minorities is explicitly banned in Section 170 (3) of the Criminal Code of Lithuania. For example, a 2010 preliminary investigation by Lithuanian authorities revealed that 160 out of about 180 instances of hate speech (most of them online) concerned the LGBT community. The perpetrators are usually fined, and their computers occasionally get confiscated.

== Gender identity and expression ==
Article 2.27 of the Civil Code allows any non-married person to change legal gender if this is medically possible. The second paragraph states, however, that the procedures for changing gender should be led according to a separate law. The Parliament and the Government of Lithuania refuse to take any actions on adopting such a law after it lost the case of L v. Lithuania in the European Court of Human Rights in 2007. Since then, gender change has become possible only with a court's decision and sex reassignment surgery.

It was proposed to eliminate this provision in 2009, and once again in 2013.

In April 2017, the European Court of Human Rights ruled, in A.P., Garçon and Nicot v. France, that it is discriminatory and a human rights violation to require transgender people to undergo surgery to alter their official documents. Subsequently, two Lithuanian trans men were allowed by Lithuanian courts to change their gender on their official documents without undergoing surgery beforehand. Lithuanian LGBT groups are now calling on future legislation to remove the requirement for surgery to be introduced.

Effective from February 2, 2022, transgender individuals within Lithuania who want to change their legal name can do so legally without sex reassignment surgery under new justice regulations. However, trans people who wish to change their name on official documents will still have to obtain a certificate from a Lithuanian or EU healthcare establishment of "diagnosed transgenderism".

== Freedom of expression ==
Despite the advanced anti-discrimination laws, during the last few years, LGBT people have faced some initiatives to limit their rights to public expression.

=== Public Information Act ===
Article 39.1 of the Public Information Act (Lithuanian: Visuomenės informavimo įstatymas), amended on 30 September 2010 (and coming into effect on 18 October 2010), states that "Any advertisement or a commercial audiovisual message may not announce information humiliating a person's dignity, discriminating on grounds of race, sex or ethnic origin, citizenship, religion or faith, handicap or age; these messages may not depict or promote a sexual orientation, offend religious feelings or political convictions, promote a behaviour dangerous to health, safety or a behaviour, especially harmful to the environment". It has been argued that the law might also ban any depictions of heterosexual orientation.

Later, it was explained that a "translation error" had occurred. On 16 June 2011, a new amendment was adopted, removing the aforementioned phrase and moreover, adding sexual orientation to the grounds of banned discrimination in the Public Information Act.

=== Proposed amendments to the Code of Administrative Offences and to the Criminal Code ===
In 2011, it was proposed to amend the Code of Administrative Offences to include the provision "A public propagation of homosexual relations is punishable with a fine from 2000 to 10000 litas." At first, the Parliament allowed a debate to take place, but it later unanimously rejected the proposal. In 2013, a similar amendment was proposed once again. Another bill introduced the same year sought to amend the Criminal Code so that "the criticism of sexual or sexual practices, convictions or beliefs, or persuasion to change this behavior, practices, convictions or beliefs cannot per se be qualified as harassment, denigration, incitement to hatred, discrimination or incitement to discrimination," possibly allowing hate speech based on sexual orientation.

=== Pride Parade 2010 in Vilnius ===
In 2007, the Vilnius City Council refused to grant permission for the public meetings of LGBT advocates in May and October citing "security reasons".

In 2010, the Vilnius City Council allowed Lithuania's gay pride parade, Baltic Pride 2010, to take place on 8 May 2010. A court stopped the parade from proceeding shortly before the parade was due to take place after the Attorney General acted. The Attorney General, Raimundas Petrauskas, cited security as the reason for his involvement. President Dalia Grybauskaitė voiced her opposition to the court ruling through her spokesperson citing the constitutional right to peaceful assembly. This decision was overturned by a higher court just one day before the parade took place. With a heavy police presence, Baltic Pride 2010 took place to much violence from opponents of gay rights. Twelve violent protesters were arrested.

=== Subsequent pride parades ===
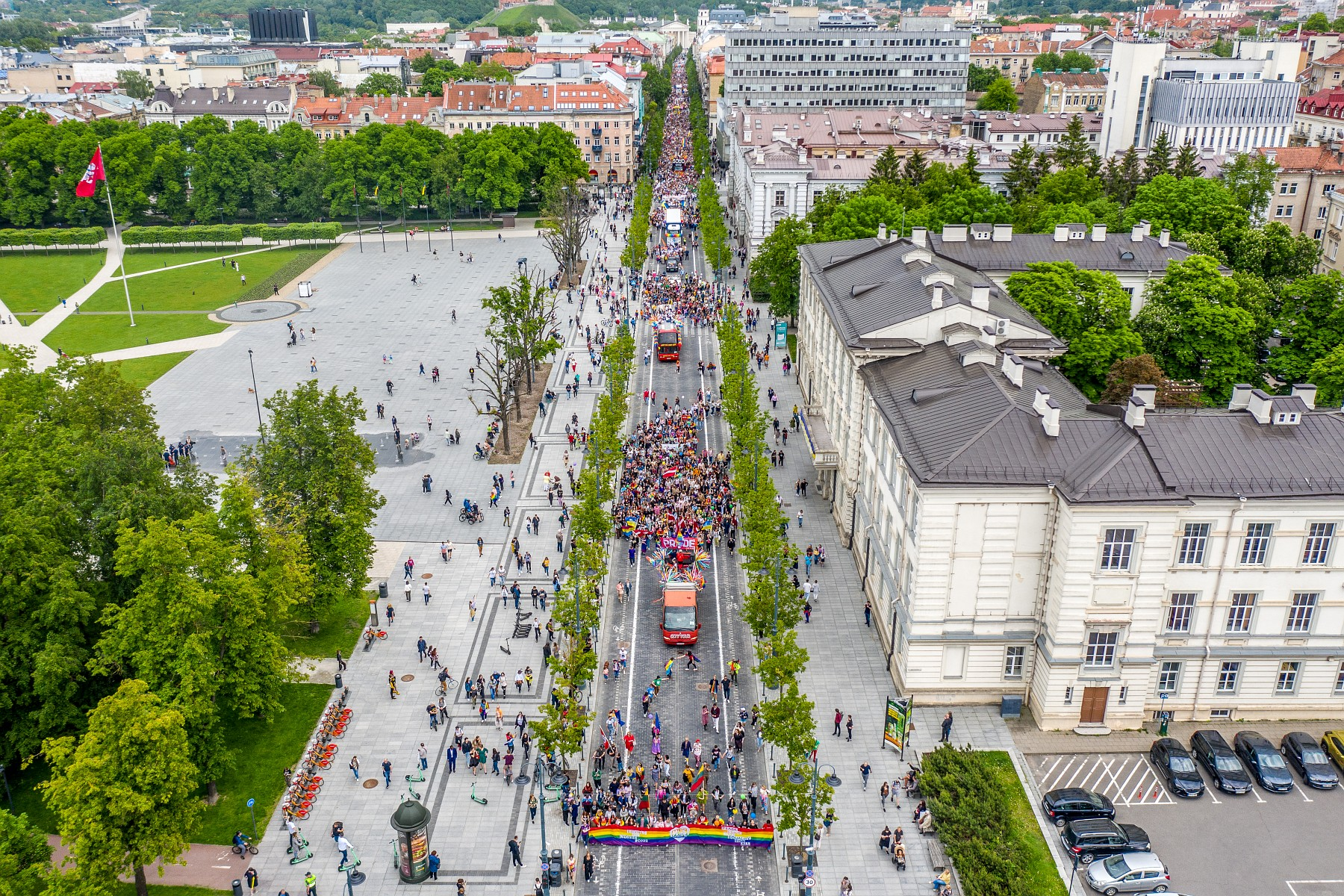
Baltic Pride 2022

The Baltic Pride parade rotates through the Baltic states on a yearly basis and in 2013, it was again Lithuania's turn to host the event. This time, the parade attracted much more attention because Lithuania at that time was in charge of the presidency of the Council of the European Union.

In January 2013, the Lithuanian Gay League (LGL) lodged a submission to the Vilnius Municipality in order to hold a parade on 27 July 2013. Unlike in 2010, LGL would not settle for an outer spot and demanded to march on Gedimino Avenue, located in the very centre of Vilnius. The Vilnius Municipality denied this submission arguing that it would be difficult to assure the appropriate safety measures. The LGL listed a complaint to the Vilnius Administrative Court requesting it to order the Vilnius Municipality to allow the march on Gedimino Avenue. Although the Mayor of Vilnius, Artūras Zuokas, consistently repeated that the municipality would implement the lower court's verdict, the case had to run through all judicial instancies. On 23 July 2013, four days before the set date, the Chief Administrative Court ordered the municipality to fully serve LGL's submission.

Approximately 500 people participated in the Baltic Pride 2013 and over 1,000 (the majority of whom were protesters) gathered around the Gedimino Avenue. Due to heavy police forces, no major disturbances took place, with only 28 people being arrested for causing public disorder, one of which was an anti-gay Lithuanian MP, Petras Gražulis. Baltic Pride 2013 included some prominent attendees, such as the Swedish Minister for European Union Affairs Birgitta Ohlsson, and American LGBT rights activist Stuart Milk. Vladimir Simonko, the leader of LGL, called Baltic Pride 2013 a festivity for the whole city of Vilnius and did not dismiss the idea of organizing an annual LGBT pride parade in Lithuania.

The 2016 Baltic Pride parade attracted about 3,000 people. The event took place without any serious injury.

The 2019 Baltic Pride parade took place between 4–9 June in Vilnius. Around 10,000 people marched at the event on 8 June 2019.

In 2020, the first Vilnius Pride march took place.

In 2023, the Vilnius Pride march took place, and around 5,000 people took part in the event.

=== Former legislation ===
==== Law on the Protection of Minors ====
On 16 June 2009, the Lithuanian Parliament approved an amendment to the Law on the Protection of Minors against the Detrimental Effects of Public Information (Lithuanian: Nepilnamečių apsaugos nuo neigiamo viešosios informacijos poveikio įstatymas), which would have effectively banned the "promotion of homosexual relations". The amendment was scheduled to go into effect on 1 March 2010. Even though it was vetoed by the President citing "lack of definitions", the veto was overturned by the Parliament. The wording of the law forbade the "propaganda of homosexual, bisexual or polygamous relations". According to some politicians who voted in favor, the possibility of defining "propaganda" should be left to lawyers.

On 17 September 2009, the European Parliament passed a resolution condemning the law and requesting the EU Fundamental Rights Agency issue a legal opinion on it. On 10 November 2009, the Lithuanian Parliament (Seimas) answered by adopting a resolution requesting the Government to seek the invalidation of the EP Resolution, which it condemned as an unlawful act. The EU Fundamental Rights Agency wrote to the European Parliament that it was not going to submit the requested legal opinion, given that it had no mandate to evaluate the legislation of member states.

Newly elected President Dalia Grybauskaitė expressed her strong disapproval of the law and formed a commission to elaborate a draft to repeal the discriminatory provisions. On 22 December 2009, the clauses banning the promotion among minors of "homosexual, bisexual, and polygamous relations" were eliminated, but as a compromise, the paragraph was replaced by a "ban to spread information that would promote sexual relations or other conceptions of concluding a marriage or creating a family other than established in the Constitution or the Civil Code". It has been argued that this provision is the first step towards instituting a ban on criticizing the Government and its decisions and thus – a menace to democracy in the country. Proponents of the law claimed to be led by a desire to protect traditional family and children; some of them have expressed the opinion that the law would ban any information in public about homosexuality, regardless of its accessibility to minors or ban any public discussions and LGBT-related events. (So we propose to establish a limit that the promotion in public places is not possible to protect the mentioned three articles of the Constitution, but without doubt in some interior premisses those people have the right to organize events, to promote, to discuss) The new version was signed by the President, satisfied that "the homophobic provisions [had] been repealed".

Significantly, the same law forbade mocking and bullying on the grounds of sexual orientation. It also possessed a number of other amendments, such as prohibiting the promotion of unhealthy nutrition to minors, a ban on information that "profanes family values", the depiction of hypnosis, etc.

The amendment was sometimes compared to Section 28, the act which prohibited discussion of homosexuality in British schools.

During its existence, there were several attempts to apply the anti-LGBTQ provisions of the law. It was unsuccessfully cited to ban the Gay Pride parade in 2010, and in 2013, and successfully referenced to declare one advertisement related to the Vilnius Gay Pride 2013 as appropriate to be broadcast at night time only and with the adult content logo. The reason given by the Board of Experts of Journalism Ethics Inspector Service was that one person in the advertisement had a T-shirt with an inscription in Lithuanian "For the diversity of families". In their opinion, it encouraged a different conception of family and marriage than established in Lithuanian laws.

In 2014, based on similar grounds, the same institution recommended restricting the distribution of a children's book of tales titled "Gintarinė širdis" ("Amber Heart") published by the Lithuanian University of Educational Sciences, because two stories in it were related to same-sex relationships. The Board ordered the book to be labelled "Not suitable for children under 14 years" and referring to this recommendation, the Ministry of Culture banned the book altogether. The case have been escalated to the European Court of Human Rights in November 2019, and was heard by the Grand Chamber on 23 March 2022. In January 2023, the Court ruled that the government's actions were in violation of article 10, the right to freedom of expression, of the treaty.

In 2014, a video clip of a gay rights organisation promoting tolerance towards LGBT people was refused to air by all major Lithuanian TV stations despite not having any overt sexuality-related content, fearing a potential breach of the Law on the Protection of Minors. The breach was later unanimously confirmed by the Board of Experts of Journalism Ethics Inspector Service.

On 18 December 2024, the Constitutional Court of Lithuania declared the anti-LGBT provisions of the Law of the Protection of Minors a violation of Article 25 of the Constitution of Lithuania, which guarantees freedom of speech, and Article 38 of the Constitution, which defines family as "the foundation of society and the state" and that the state protects and cares for the family, motherhood, fatherhood, and childhood. According to the Constitutional Court, the Seimas did not clearly define in the disputed provisions of the law what information disparages family values and promotes a different concept of marriage and family formation than that enshrined in the Constitution and the Civil Code, and therefore must be classified as information that has a negative impact on minors, and thus "created the premises for narrowing the content of the family as a constitutional institution".

== Military service ==
Gays, lesbians, and bisexuals are allowed to serve openly in the military.

== Living conditions ==
In March 2016, a Vilnius street mural depicting American President Donald Trump and Russian President Vladimir Putin kissing went viral.

In May 2017, in honour of the International Day against Homophobia, the Vilnius Town Hall was illuminated in rainbow colours. The event was welcomed by the City Mayor, the U.S. Ambassador, and other politicians. That same day, the Parliament held an art exhibit with LGBT rights as its theme.

=== Political support ===
The Freedom Party supports legalising same-sex marriage in Lithuania. Some politicians from other political parties, mostly representatives of the Lithuanian Social Democratic Party (notably Marija Aušrinė Pavilionienė) and the Liberals' Movement of the Republic of Lithuania (notably Leonidas Donskis) have expressed their support for LGBT rights and initiated a few laws and resolutions supporting LGBT rights. The main organizations defending LGBT rights in Lithuania are the Tolerant Youth Association and the Lithuanian Gay League. MP Rokas Žilinskas was the first member of Parliament to come out as gay.

=== Public opinion ===
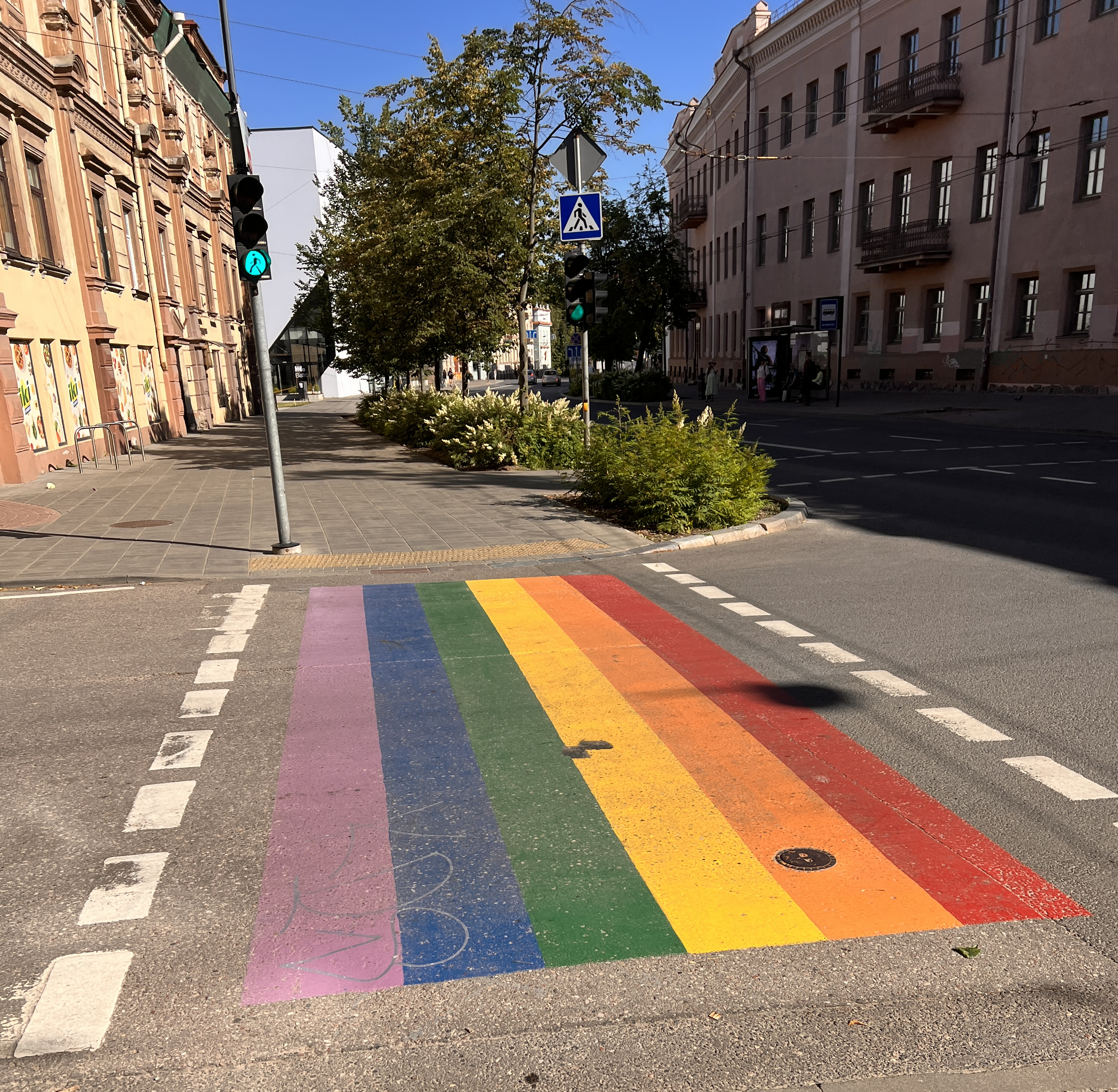
Pedestrian crossing using the LGBT rainbow colours in Vilnius.

A European Union member poll, conducted in 2006, showed Lithuania at 17% support for same-sex marriage and 12% for rights of adoption, among the lowest in the EU. Another study, conducted in 2006, showed that 42% of respondents would agree on a same-sex civil partnership law, 12% on same-sex marriage, and 13% on the right to adopt. Support for same-sex couples' rights somewhat diminished afterwards. A 2012 study revealed a 10% support for same-sex partnerships, 7% for same-sex marriages, while an identical study in 2013 showed only a 7% support for partnerships and 5% support for marriages. However, the 2015 Eurobarometer showed support for same-sex marriage at 24%, and 44% believed that gay people should receive the same rights as straight people.

A poll conducted in 2009 showed that only 16% of Lithuanians would approve of a gay pride march in the capital Vilnius and 81.5% of respondents considered homosexuality as a perversion, disease, or paraphilia.

A 2016 Pew Research Center poll found that 69% of Lithuanians believed homosexuality should not be accepted by society.

The 2019 Eurobarometer found that 30% of Lithuanians thought same-sex marriage should be allowed throughout Europe, 63% were against.

Following 2020, a few anti-gender political parties and movements emerged, most notably the Lithuanian Family Movement, which opposes same-sex civil unions, same-sex marriages and adoption, deeming them to be unconstitutional and a threat to the traditional nuclear families and children.

The 2023 Eurobarometer found that 39% of Lithuanians thought same-sex marriage should be allowed throughout Europe, and 42% agreed that "there is nothing wrong in a sexual relationship between two persons of the same sex".

== Summary table ==
| Same-sex sexual activity legal | (Since 1993) |
| Equal age of consent (16) | (Since 2003) |
| Freedom of expression | (Since 2024) |
| Anti-discrimination laws in employment only | (Since 2005) |
| Anti-discrimination laws in the provision of goods and services | (Since 2005) |
| Anti-discrimination laws in all other areas (incl. indirect discrimination, hate speech) | |
| Recognition of same-sex couples | (Since 2025) |
| Same-sex civil unions | (Since 2025) |
| Same-sex marriages | (Constitutional ban since 1992; same-sex marriages registered in the European Union recognized for residency purposes since 2018) |
| Stepchild adoption by same-sex couples | Yes (Under case law, since 2024) |
| Joint adoption by same-sex couples | (Pending) |
| Gays, lesbians and bisexuals allowed to serve openly in the military | |
| Right to change legal gender | |
| Gender self-identification | |
| Conversion therapy banned on minors | (Pending) |
| Access to IVF for lesbians | (Available only to heterosexual married couples) |
| Commercial surrogacy for gay male couples | |
| MSMs allowed to donate blood | (Since 2022) |

== See also ==
- Politics of Lithuania
- LGBTQ rights in Europe
- LGBTQ rights in the European Union
