= Baltic Pride =

Annual LGBT event in the Baltic states

Logo of Baltic Pride, interlocking the three national flags.

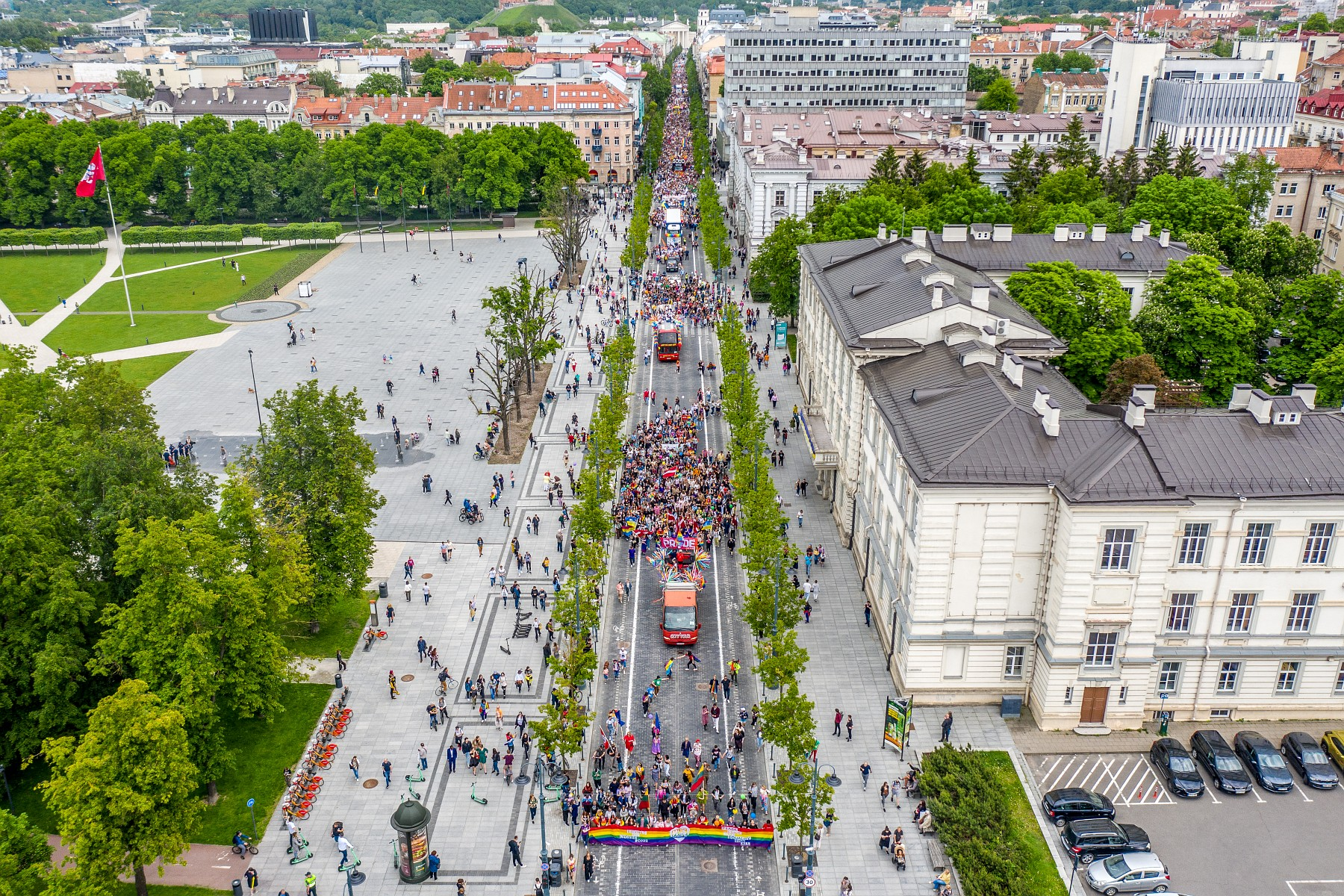
Baltic Pride 2022 (Vilnius)

Baltic Pride is an annual LGBT+ pride parade rotating in turn between the capitals of the Baltic states; Tallinn, Riga, and Vilnius. It is held in support of raising issues of tolerance and the rights of the LGBT community, and is supported by ILGA-Europe. Since 2009, the main organisers have been Mozaīka (the National LGBT Rights Organization of Latvia), the Lithuanian Gay League (LGL), and the Estonian LGBT Association.

== History ==
=== Latvia ===
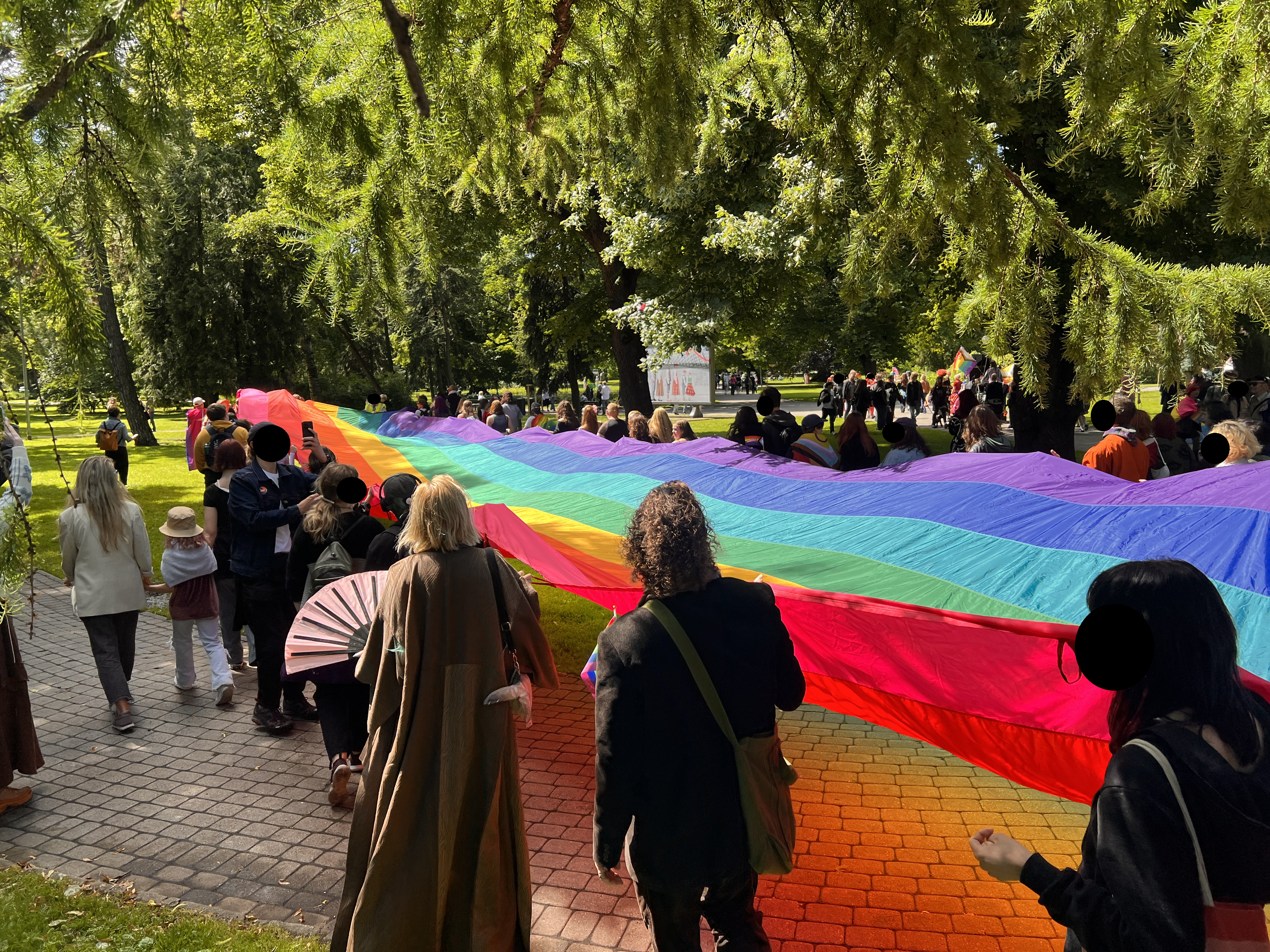
Arrival of the Riga Pride Parade 2025 in Vērmane Garden.

The first pride event held in Latvia took place in 2005 under the name Riga Pride, as the local equivalent to other pride parades held elsewhere around the world. Political opposition to Pride emerged after organizers received a permit. The Prime Minister of Latvia Aigars Kalvītis publicly opposed the event, and Pride was officially sanctioned only after a court overturned a withdrawal of the permit. The deputy Mayor of Riga Juris Lujāns resigned in protest of the event going ahead.

Following public manifestations of homophobia surrounding the first event in 2005, some members of the LGBT community, their friends, and family members united to found the organisation Mozaīka (Mosaic) in an attempt to improve the understanding of and tolerance for LGBT rights in Latvia.

From 2006, the event was officially known as Riga Pride and Friendship Days, expanding the programme beyond a parade to include an ecumenical church service at St. Saviour's Anglican Church, and seminars on tolerance and LGBT rights. It was significantly disrupted by protesters from "No Pride", among other groups. The European Parliament expressed its disappointment at the failure of Latvian authorities to adequately protect the parade.

The event took place in Riga in 2007 and 2008.

In 2009, the march was allowed by the Administrative Court of Riga. It was the first to be called Baltic Pride and began a rotation annually between each Baltic state capital in cooperation with the Lithuanian Gay League, the Estonian LGBT Association (until 2012 known as Estonian Gay Youth), and their local Pride events.

At the 2012 Baltic Pride, 400 people marched in support of LGBT rights in Latvia, with US diplomats joining them to show support.

In 2015, the parade took place as part of the Europride event in Riga, the first time the pan-European LGBT rights week came to an ex-Soviet state.

In 2018, 8000 people marched in the pride parade held in Riga.

==== Opposition ====
Over the years, the event has been threatened by protests. In 2006, Riga City Council at first tried to refuse permission for the Pride Parade. Similar political debates surrounded the first Pride Parade in 2005.

The LGBT community in Latvia has been divided in its attitudes to the event. In a February 2007 survey of 537 LGBT persons by ILGA-Latvija, 82% of respondents said they were not in favour of holding the planned Riga Pride and Friendship Days 2007, while only 7% felt that these events would help promote tolerance towards sexual minorities. ILGA-Latvija, however, has since changed its stance and now is positive towards the Riga Pride and Friendship Days.

=== Lithuania ===
The parade took place in Vilnius in 2010; it was the first public pride march organised in Lithuania.

In 2013, the mayor of Vilnius attempted to relocate the parade to the riverbank (where it had taken place in 2010), on a remote street outside the city centre. Two courts ruled that he could not, and that the Baltic Pride had the right to use the same route other public demonstrations did.

Mayor of Vilnius Remigijus Šimašius from the Liberal Movement has stated he has no opposition to the city hosting the 2016 parade. On 18 June 2016, a crowd of 3,000 Lithuanian LGBT* community members and allies participated in the Baltic Pride March on the central avenue in the centre of Vilnius. The march took place without any serious incidents. People marched from Lukiškių Square to Bernardine Garden, a total of 2.3 kilometres (1.4 mi). After the march, the participants gathered at the Loftas art factory for a music concert, featuring performances by Dana International, DJ Leomeo, LaDiva Live, Maria Sam Katseva, Donny Montell, Ruslanas Kirilkinas, and Sasha Song.

Baltic Pride was used to challenge the discriminatory application of the "anti-gay propaganda" legislation and to encourage public debate on the recognition of same-sex unions in Lithuania.

The 2019 pride took place between 4–9 June in Vilnius. Around 10,000 people marched in the gay pride on 8 June 2019.

In 2022, the Baltic Pride festival took place from 1 to 5 June. More than 10,000 participants attended the traditional March for Equality and Peace (the latter dedication appearing in light of the war in nearby Ukraine), and the Proud Cities Concert that followed.

On June 7, 2025, Vilnius hosted the most significant event of the year for the LGBTQ+ community in Lithuania – the Baltic Pride March for Equality. The main event of the Baltic Pride festival drew an unprecedented 20,000 participants, marking the largest gathering in the history of Lithuania’s LGBTQ+ rights movement.

=== Estonia ===
Pride parades have been organised since 2004 in Tallinn. The city hosted Baltic Pride in 2011, 2014, and 2017.

=== 2020 Cancellation ===
Due to the COVID-19 pandemic in Europe, the organisation decided to cancel the event in 2020. The 2020 edition of Baltic Pride was planned to happen in Tallinn.

== International support ==
Aside from ILGA-Europe, the event has also received consistent support from other LGBT organisations in neighbouring countries, most notably RFSL from Sweden, and Amnesty International.

== See also ==
- LGBTQ rights in Estonia
- LGBTQ rights in Latvia
- LGBTQ rights in Lithuania
