= Eeva Esse-Sõõrumaa =

Estonian journalist (born 1990)

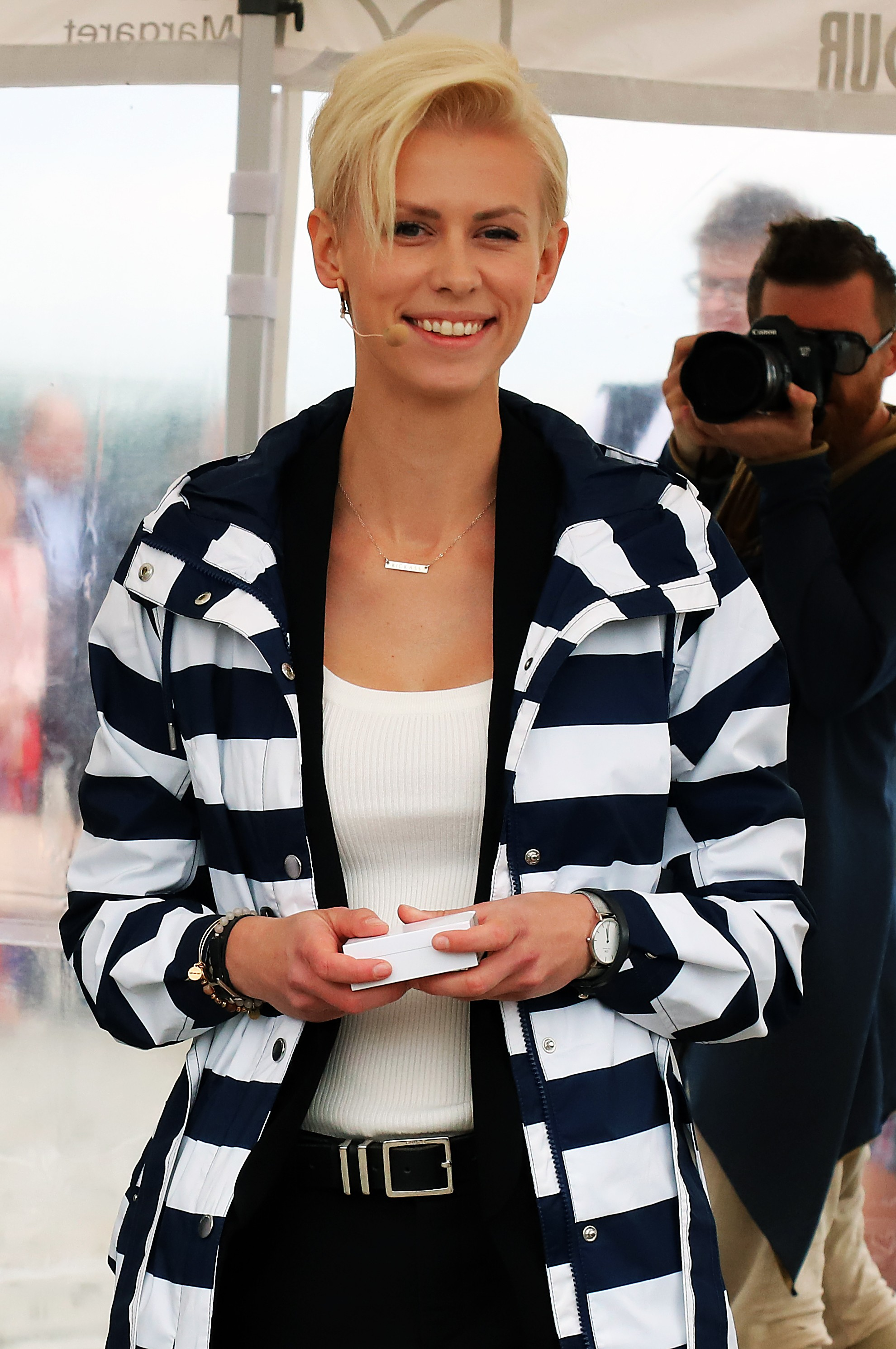
- Esse-Sõõrumaa in 2019 on the Admiral Bellingshausen
- Born: Eeva Esse; 5 May 1990 (age 36)
- Education: University of Tartu
- Occupation: Journalist
- Spouse: Sander Sõõrumaa
- Awards: Estonian Entertainment Awards: Sexiest Woman of the Year (2024)

Eeva Esse-Sõõrumaa also known by her maiden name Eeva Esse (born 5 May 1990) is an Estonian journalist.

== Education ==
Esse studied at Tartu Kivilinna Gymnasium from 1997 to 2009. She studied journalism and communication at the University of Tartu from 2009 to 2012.

== Career ==
Following her studies, she worked for ERR (abbr. for Eesti Rahvusringhäälingus, lit. 'Estonian Public Broadcasting'), where she served as a presenter for the economic news portion of Aktuaalse kaamera (lit. 'Current camera') until 2015. She was the editor for the economic programme Kapital from 2016 to 2017. In 2017, she presented a six-part human rights series on ETV titled Igaühe õigus (lit. 'Everyone’s Right') and from 2017 to 2019, she presented the ETV-s programme Uudishimu tippkeskus (lit. 'Center for Curiosity'). Between 2014 and 2019, she was a presenter for the Radio 2 programme Agenda. She has worked at Kanal 2 since 2018. Initially, she was part of the production team for the programme Radar, after which she became the presenter for the shows Kuldvillak (Jeopardy!). She has also hosted Tõelised kangelased (lit. 'True Heroes').

Since 2021, she has been one of the hosts of the programme Kolm naist karavanis (lit. 'Three Women in a Caravan'). She has been the host of the eponymous talk show Esse on Kanal 2. She has been a presenters on the programme Täistund.

== Film ==
- 2016 – documentary India – teel tippu (lit. 'India – On the Way to the Top"'), author
- 2018 – feature film "Klassikokkutulek 2. Pulmad ja matused" (lit. 'Class Reunion 2: Weddings and Funerals'), supporting role – radio presenter

== Recognition and awards ==
- 2024: Estonian Entertainment awards "Sexiest Woman of the Year"

== Personal life ==
In 2011, she met Sander Sõõrumaa at the University of Tartu. They were married on 5 August 2022.

She has stated that her greatest role models in journalism are Christiane Amanpour (CNN) and John Oliver (HBO).

In 2019, she sailed on the Admiral Bellingshausen, a Dutch-built, Jongert 24 type Estonian motor sailing ship, which is being used to celebrate the 200th anniversary of the Antarctic discovery expedition.

In 2018, she completed the Swedish "Svensk Klassiker" four-sport challenge (classic cross-country skiing (90 km), road cycling (300 km), swimming (3 km), and cross-country running (30 km)). The 2018 event celebrated the 100th anniversary of the Republic of Estonia. Five Estonian journalists participated, including Esse: Jüri Muttika, Hannes Hermaküla, Rasmus Kagge, and Raivo Rimm. Esse and Rimm finished the challenge, while the others were forced to withdraw due to injuries. She completed a similar event to the "Svensk Klassiker" in Germany (called the Deutschland Klassiker), which also consisted of four sporting events.
