= Estonian LGBT Association =

Organization based in Estonia

Estonian LGBT Association (Estonian: Eesti LGBT Ühing) is the official representative of LGBT citizens in Estonia. Focusing mainly on informing the general public about LGBT people, sexual education and advancing LGBT rights. It was founded on 9 October 2008 in Tartu as the non-profit organization Eesti Gei Noored (Estonian Gay Youth).

== Education ==
Estonian LGBT Association offers schooling for teachers and social workers. The purpose of the training is to help individuals who work with adolescents to understand LGBT people, their situation in Estonia and how to offer support to people who experience homophobic harassment.

== LGBT rights ==
The Estonian LGBT Association offers support and encourages individuals to advance LGBT rights in Estonia.

The president of the Estonian LGBT Association, Helen Talalaev, has supported the gender-neutral marriage law, claiming that same-sex couples are already living together and this new law would give them legal security.

== See also ==
- Anette Mäletjärv
