= Bernardine Garden =

Park in Vilnius, Lithuania

Coordinates: 54°41′0″N 25°17′49″E

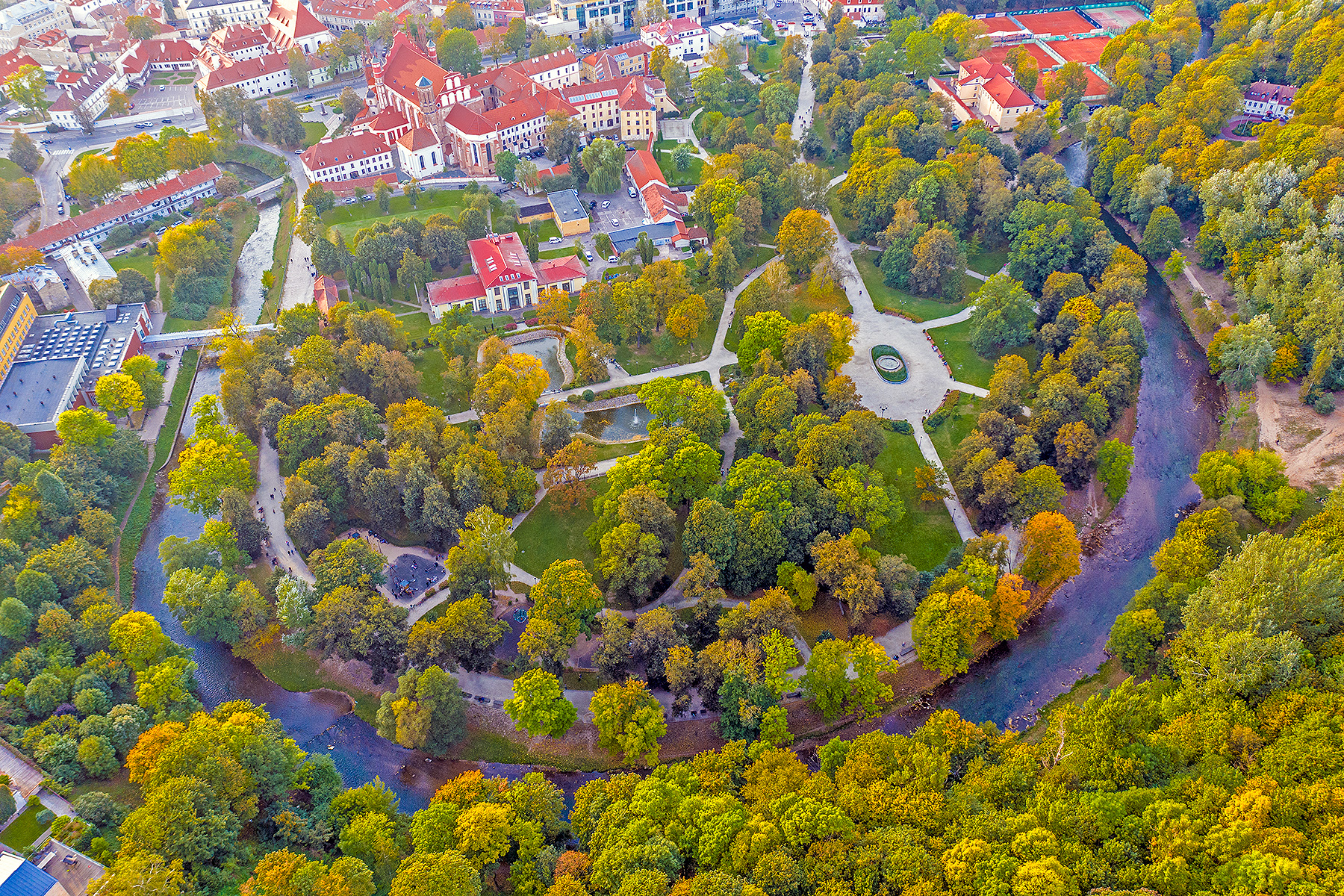
Bernardine Garden (2020)

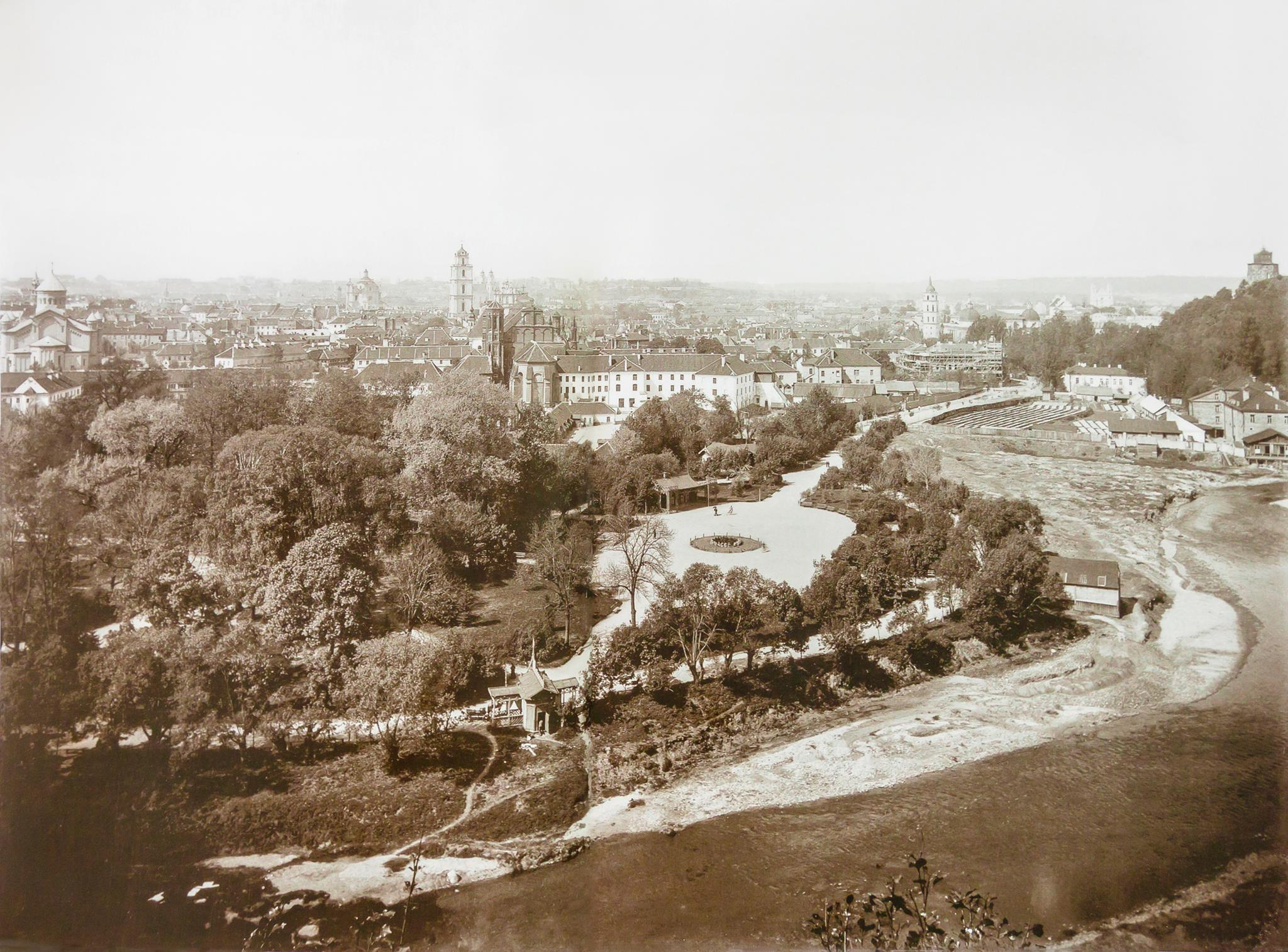
Historical view (1895)

The Bernardine Garden (Lithuanian: Bernardinų sodas, Polish: ogród Bernardyński or ogród Bernardynów), previously known as Sereikiškės Park, is a public park in the city of Vilnius, Lithuania. It is located on the left bank of the Vilnia River between the Gediminas Tower and Bernardine Monastery and covers over 9 hectares (22 acres). Most of its territory is parkland, divided in the monastery exposition, the botanic exposition and other recreational territory including a children's amusement park. It hosts a variety of festivals and exhibitions, including an amateur chess championship of Ostap Bender.

== History ==
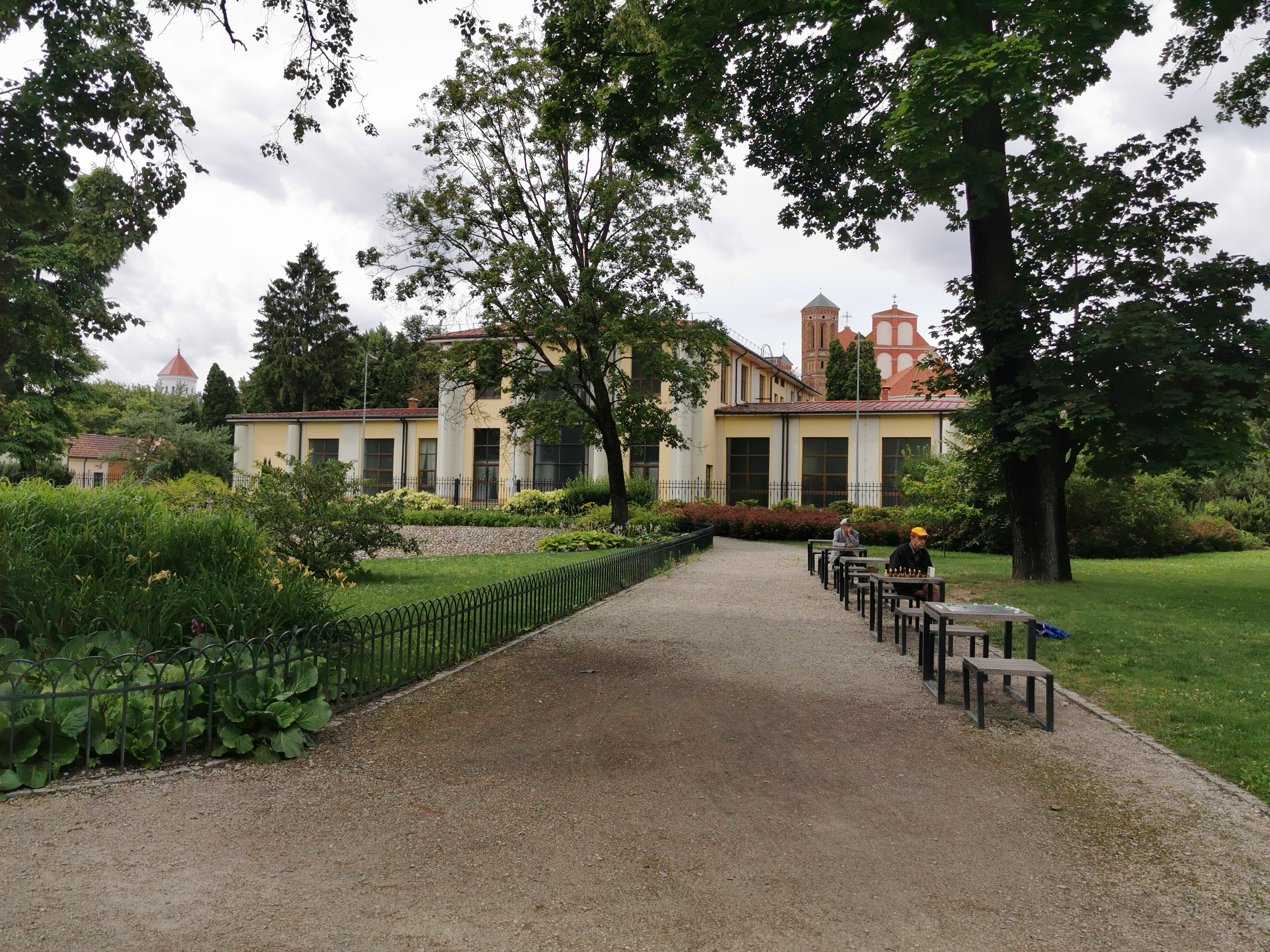
Chess tables in the park

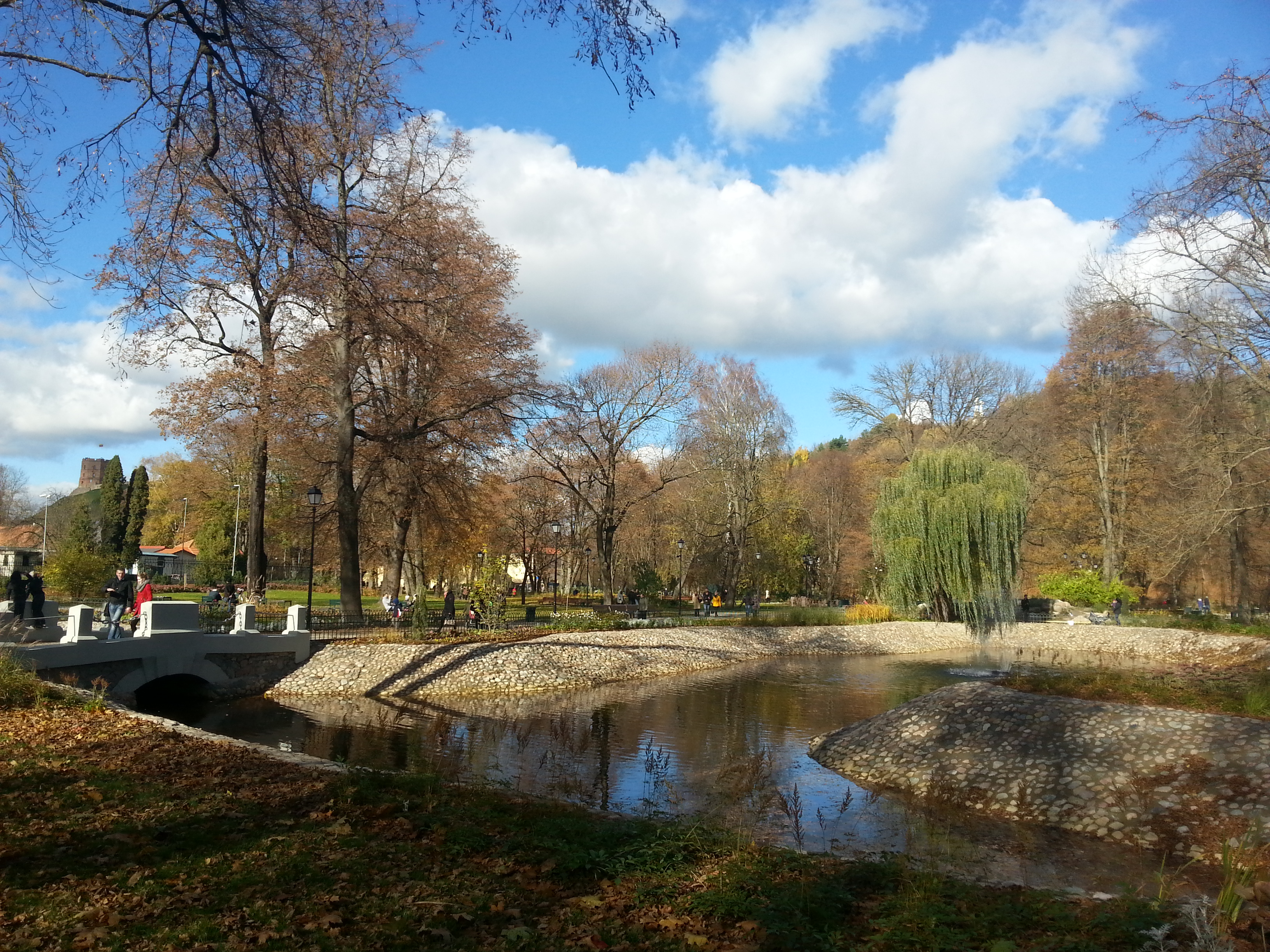
Bernardinai Garden in autumn (2013)

Until the 14th century, in the territory of Bernardine garden there was a Lithuanian pagan saint oaks wood. After the advent of Christianity, the oaks were cut down and in 1469, when the King of Poland and Grand Duke of Lithuania Casimir IV Jagiellon invited the Bernardine monks to Vilnius, the park was created. The monks rearranged the territory, set up a botanic exposition and organised a lot of other events.

In 1864 the Russian tsarist government closed the Bernardine garden, but about twenty years later the townspeople recovered it. It was reconstructed according to the A. V. Strauss and Jakub Jasiński project. But during World War II, the Bernardine garden was destroyed. During the Soviet occupation it was reconstructed for the second time and named Jaunimo sodas ("The Youth Garden").

In 2013, the Bernardine garden was reconstructed for the third time. Reconstruction works were done by "Vilnius city parks" and partly funded by the European Union. It is nowadays operational, and is known as one of the attractions in the Vilnius Old Town.

== Educational and recreational zones ==
The botanical exposition is an area of the park where plants are sorted by groups and classes. In this exposition’s centre there is a small pool containing sacred water plants.

The monastery garden exposition was developed with medicinal herbs, potherbs, and edible and tea plants. There is a small fountain in the centre of the exposition and a pergola covered in climbing plants.

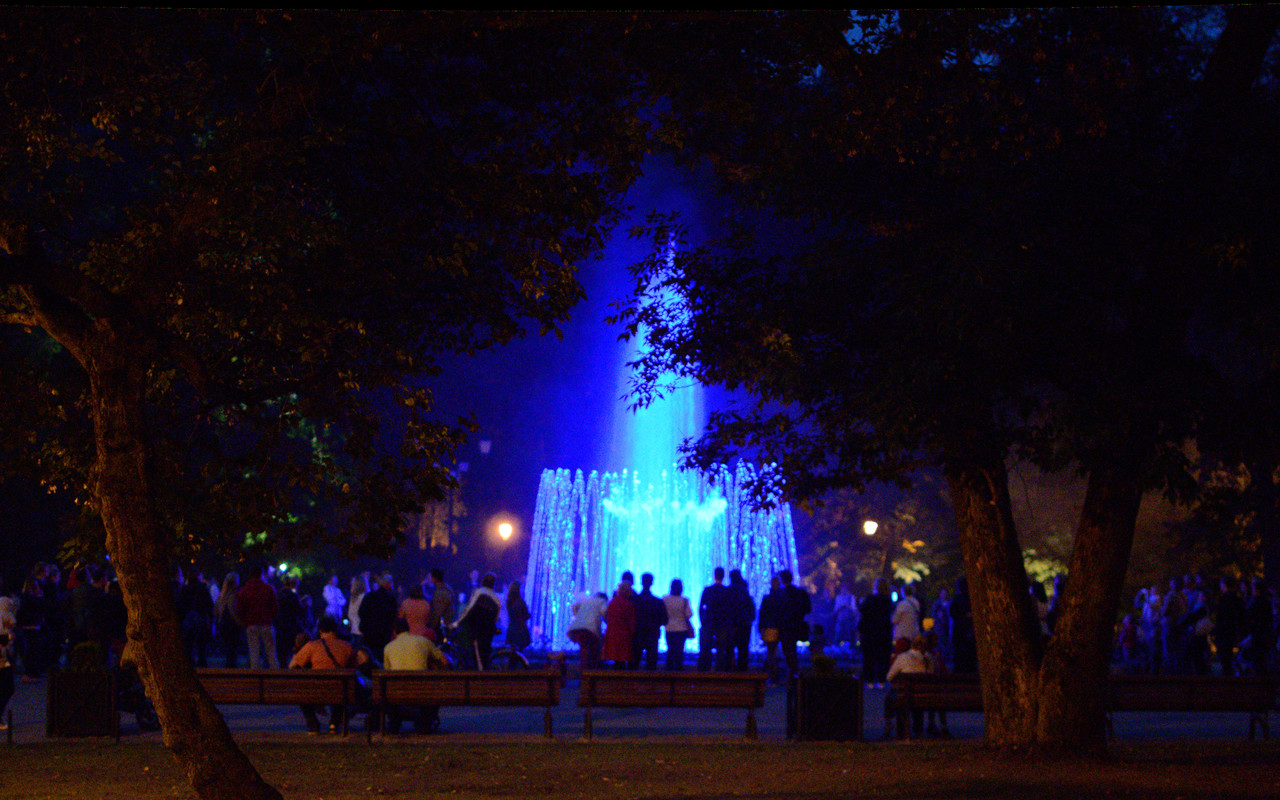
Singing fountain in Bernardinai Garden

In the rest territory of the park there are two fountains. The main fountain, which is situated in the centre of Bernardine garden, works all the day at weekends in a warm period of the year. On work days the fountain works only from 9 pm to 10 pm as a light and music show. Also there is a rockery, a carousel, a playing ground for children, a giant chessboard, and checkers and chess tables. In a warm period of the year one can enjoy different expositions of sculptures.
