= Lithuanian Gay League =

Lithuanian civil rights organization

- Nacionalinė LGBT Teisių Organizacija
- Abbreviation: LGL
- Founded: December 3, 1993
- Type: Nonprofit, nongovernmental organization
- Purpose: To fight homophobia and discrimination based on sexual orientation and gender identity and to promote an inclusive social environment for gay men, lesbian women, bisexual and transgender persons.
- Headquarters: Vilnius, Lithuania
- Coordinates: 54.678955°N 25.278502°E
- Website: www.lgl.lt

The Lithuanian Gay League (LGL) is the only non-governmental organization in Lithuania exclusively representing the interests of the local LGBT* community. The LGL association is one of the most stable and oldest organizations within the civic sector in the country, as it was founded on 3 December 1993. The main principle characterizing the activities of the association is the principle of independence from any political or financial interests, with the view of attaining effective social inclusion and integration of the local LGBT* community in Lithuania. Based on its expertise in the fields of advocacy, awareness raising, and community building, accumulated during twenty years of organizational existence, LGL strives for the consistent progress in the field of human rights for LGBT* people.

== History ==
Shortly after its independence was restored, Lithuania decriminalized consensual sexual relations between men. Before the amendment of the criminal code in 1993, such relations were punishable by multi-year prison sentences. However, despite this progress, "Lithuanian homosexuals were still living 'underground', unable to be themselves, stigmatized by the media as HIV/AIDS spreaders", as leaders of the national LGBT rights movement Vladimir Simonko and Eduardas Platovas recall.

In order to combat such discrimination, Simonko and Platovas opened the 'Amsterdam' club in Vilnius in 1993 and published the newspaper Amsterdam in 1994. In April 1994, the two organized the first International Lesbian and Gay Association (ILGA) East Europe conference, which took place in the Lithuanian town of Palanga. This event was especially significant because it was the first conference of that nature to be hosted in a post-Soviet state. Simonko and Platovas officially founded the Lithuanian Gay League in 1995, and the organization has since served as the only organization in the country exclusively fighting for the promotion of LGBT* rights.

== See also ==
- LGBT rights in Lithuania
