= Kazimieras Uoka =

Lithuanian politician

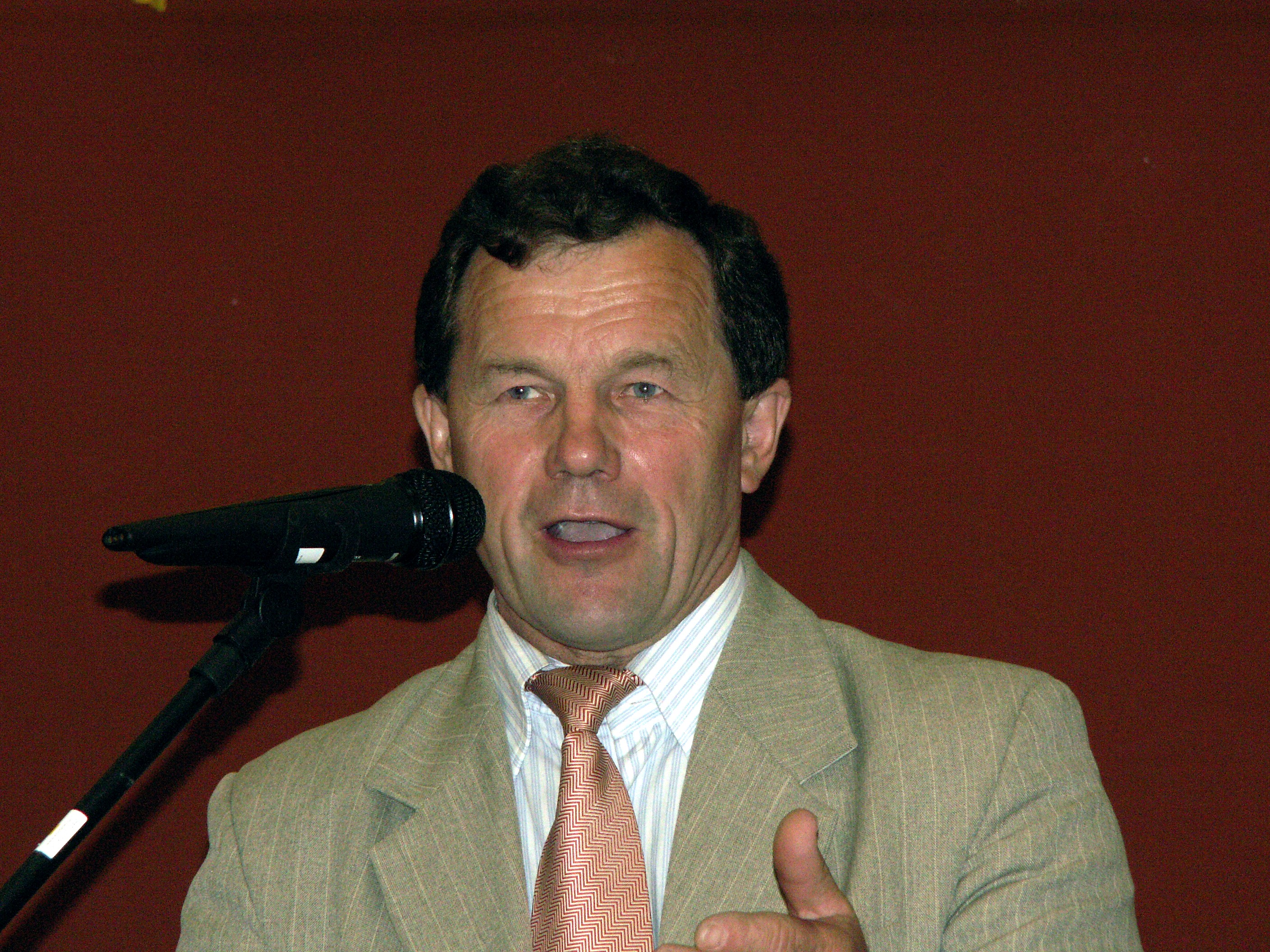
Kazimieras Uoka

Kazimieras Uoka (4 March 1951 – 16 July 2016) was a Lithuanian politician and signatory of the 1990 Act of the Re-Establishment of the State of Lithuania.

Born in Kaunas, Uoka received a degree in history from Vilnius University in 1976. He was a leader of the labor movement in the early years of the independence movement.
