= 2021 Social Democratic Party of Lithuania leadership election =

Political party leadership election

- 3–9 May
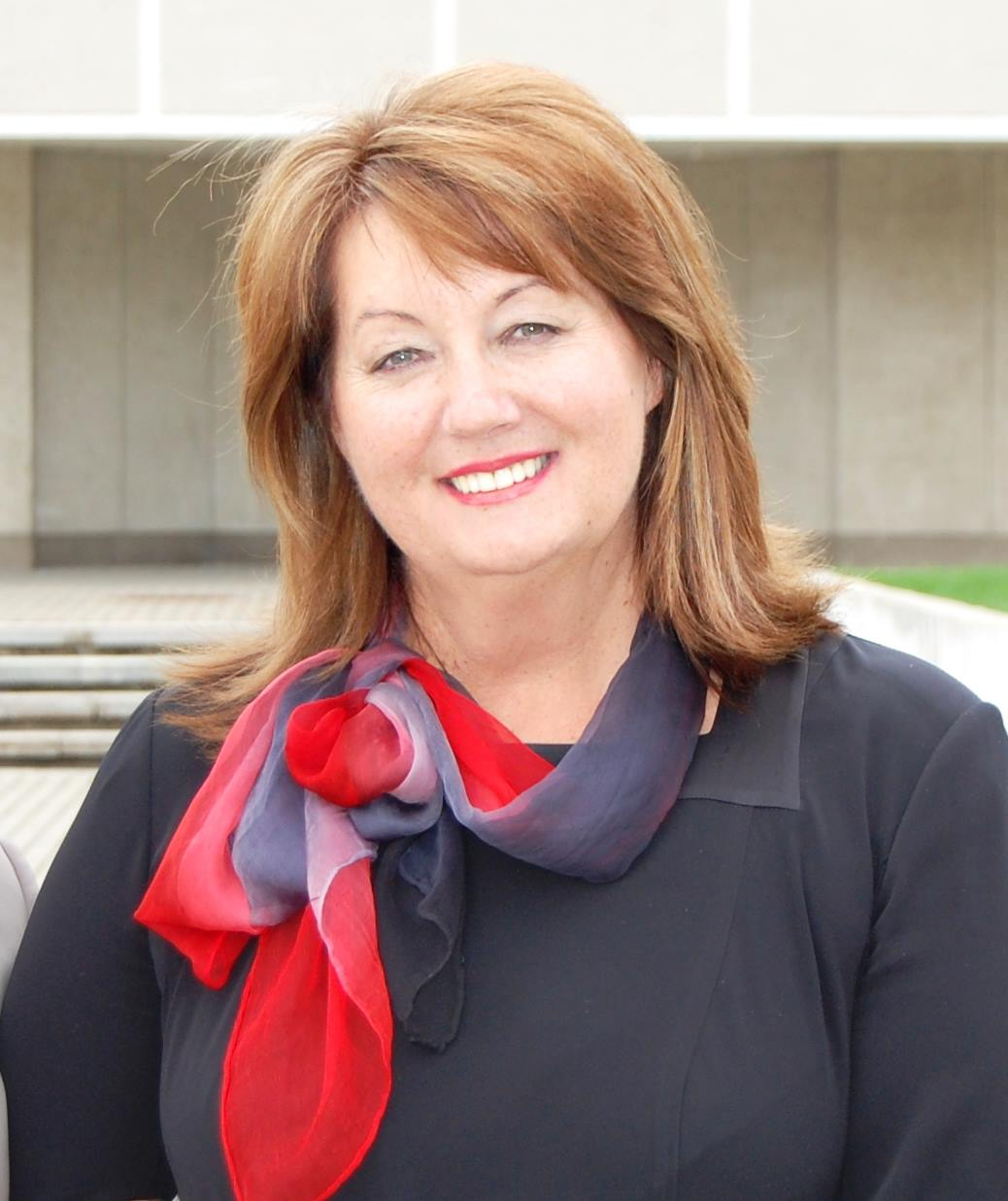

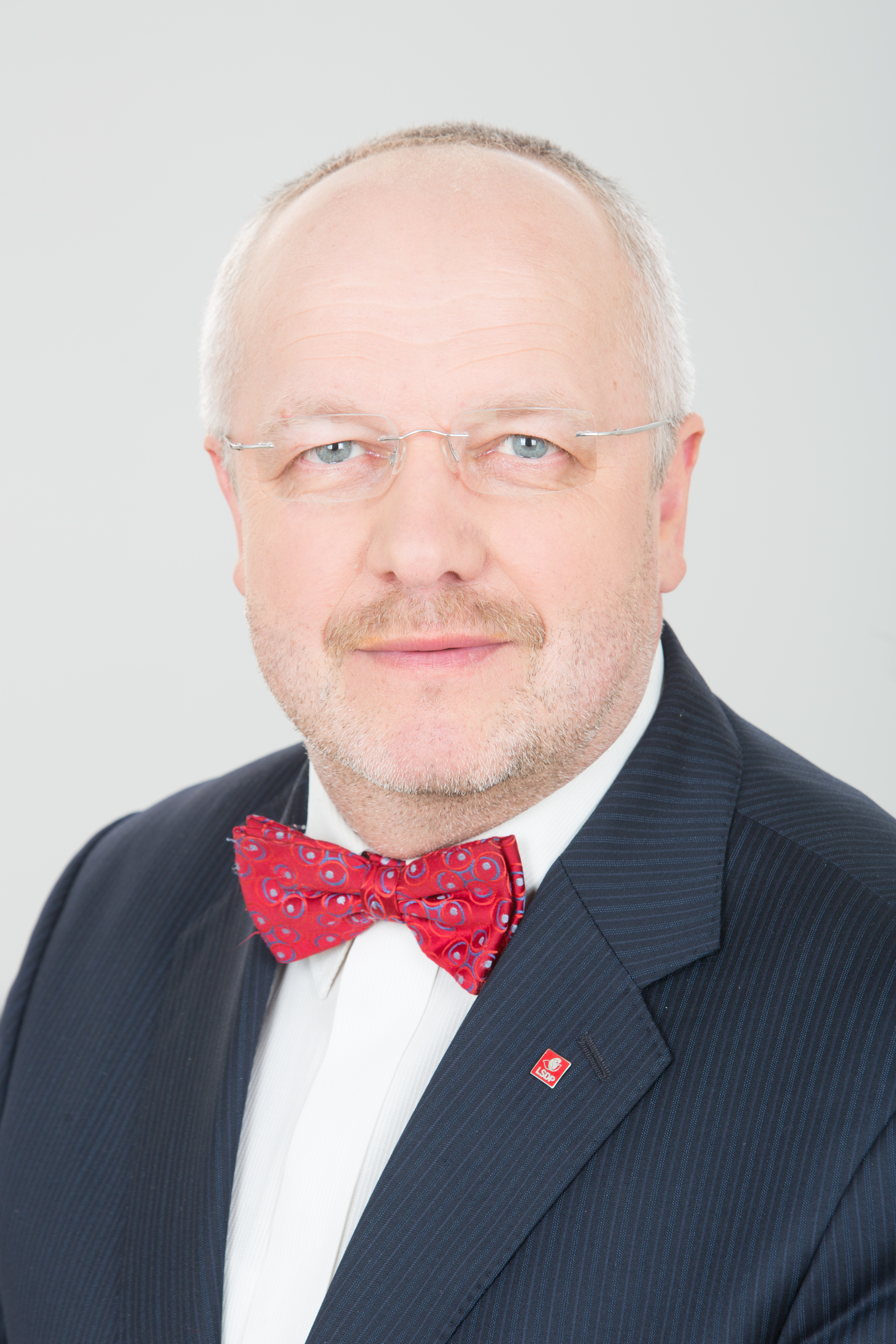
Nominee	Vilija Blinkevičiūtė	Juozas Olekas
Popular vote	4,515	3,421
Percentage	56.32%	43.68%
Chairperson before election
Gintautas Paluckas
Elected Chairperson
Vilija Blinkevičiūtė

The 2021 Social Democratic Party of Lithuania leadership election took place on 3–9 May 2021 to elect the chairperson of the Social Democratic Party of Lithuania. It was the third direct leadership election in the party's history.

The party's previous chairman, Gintautas Paluckas, resigned on 22 January 2021, after the party's defeat in the 2020 parliamentary election. Member of the European Parliament Vilija Blinkevičiūtė was elected as the party's chairwoman with 56 percent of the vote and became the party's first female leader in its history.

== Procedure ==
According to the party statute, the chairperson of the Social Democratic Party is responsible for the party's organization, formulates tasks for the party's branches, leads the party's council and presidium, proposes the party's candidates to the Government of Lithuania and other political posts to the presidium, and, finally, is the face of the party and is expected to be the party's candidate to the office of Prime Minister of Lithuania. They are elected for a two-year term, and can be reelected.

Until 2017, the chairperson was elected by a party convention. The first direct chairperson election was held in 2017 and was won by Gintautas Paluckas, defeating Mindaugas Sinkevičius with 51.77% of the vote. The party did not want to be left behind by the Homeland Union and Liberal Movement, both of whom had already held direct party leader elections, and it was lauded by the party's membership as a move towards internal democracy.

== Candidates ==
Four candidates participated in the leadership election, although two withdrew from the race.

- Vilija Blinkevičiūtė, Minister of Social Security and Labour from 2000 to 2008, Member of the Seimas from 2004 to 2009, Member of the European Parliament since 2009;
- Juozas Olekas, Minister of National Defence from 2006 to 2008 and again from 2012 to 2016, Member of the European Parliament since 2019.

Blinkevičiūtė's election program, "All Our Hearts - To the Left" (Lithuanian: Visų mūsų širdys - kairėje!), raised three goals of her leadership - to strengthen the pride and loyalty of social democracy and refuse to "give up their position to pretenders"; to win the 2023 municipal elections; and to pursue social justice and equal opportunities.

Olekas's election manifesto also focused on making gains in the 2023 municipal elections, but also reform to the party's structure to allow local party branches to formulate tasks for the party centre. According to his manifesto, the party must stand for the weak and self-employed, and its main principles are solidarity, sustainable development, equality and justice. He vowed to stay as chairman for one term and then hand over the reins of the party to younger leaders.

The elections were also contested by:

- Liutauras Gudžinskas, professor (endorsed Blinkevičiūtė)
- Vitalijus Mitrofanovas, mayor of Akmenė District Municipality since 2008 (endorsed Olekas)

Gudžinskas represented the progressive wing of the party. His program vowed to expand the internal democracy of the party by allowing all members of the party to rank candidates to the Seimas, the European Parliament and in local elections, establishing internal party referendums, and the inclusion of more progressive tenets in the party's program, such as economic democracy and further labour rights. Mitrofanovas published a short program, where he stated that the party must represent the interests of working people, seniors and families, that the party has veered too far to the right and lost the trust of the people, and the party should follow "the fundamental goals of the Social Democrats, such as social welfare for everyone, the rule of law, transparency and pluralism of opinions, respect and political culture, the working and earning person who creates the welfare and wealth of the state, and a solidary society".

Branches of the party also nominated Paluckas, Sinkevičius and Orinta Leiputė, but all three of them refused the nomination. Paluckas took responsibility for the party's poor election results and did not want to escalate polarization within the party; Leiputė was content with remaining as one of the vice-chairwomen; and Sinkevičius did not want to risk defeat against experienced members of the party and was considered an ally of Olekas.

== Campaign ==
The election campaign was considered tense. There were accusations that the party's leadership prefers Olekas and seeks to "crown" him as chairman. The party's honorary chairman Vytenis Povilas Andriukaitis published an open letter to the party's members recommending them to vote for Olekas. Outside observers judged that Olekas was more likely to win a party convention, while Blinkevičiūtė was more likely to win a direct election.

Gudžinskas withdrew from the election on 22 April, claiming that he succeeded in his goal of "fostering democratic debate", and endorsed Blinkevičiūtė, who he claimed was the closest to social democratic ideology of the remaining candidates. Mitrofanovas withdrew on 28 April, endorsed Olekas and cited his issues with the progressive, socially liberal wing of the party which had supported Gudžinskas. According to the rules of the leadership election, Mitrofanovas's withdrawal (less than a week before the election) was too late and he should have remained on the ballot, but it was accepted by the party leadership.

Olekas had begun his campaign early, after the 2020 parliamentary election, and had the support of the party's veteran leaders, including Andriukaitis, Julius Sabatauskas and Algirdas Sysas. Blinkevičiūtė was hesitant and her campaign lacked resources, but she was encouraged by Paluckas and many party branches to participate, and she was widely popular among the lower levels of the party. She was notably popular among the party's women members. Olekas was accused of using sexist language during the campaign by claiming that "leadership of the party during difficult times should be left in the hands of men".

== Results ==
Candidates	First round	
Candidates	Votes	%
Vilija Blinkevičiūtė	4,515	56.32
Juozas Olekas	3,421	43.68
Total	8,016	100
Source: lsdp.lt
