= Ministry of Social Security and Labour (Lithuania) =

Government ministry of Lithuania

- Socialinės apsaugos ir darbo ministerija (in Lithuanian)

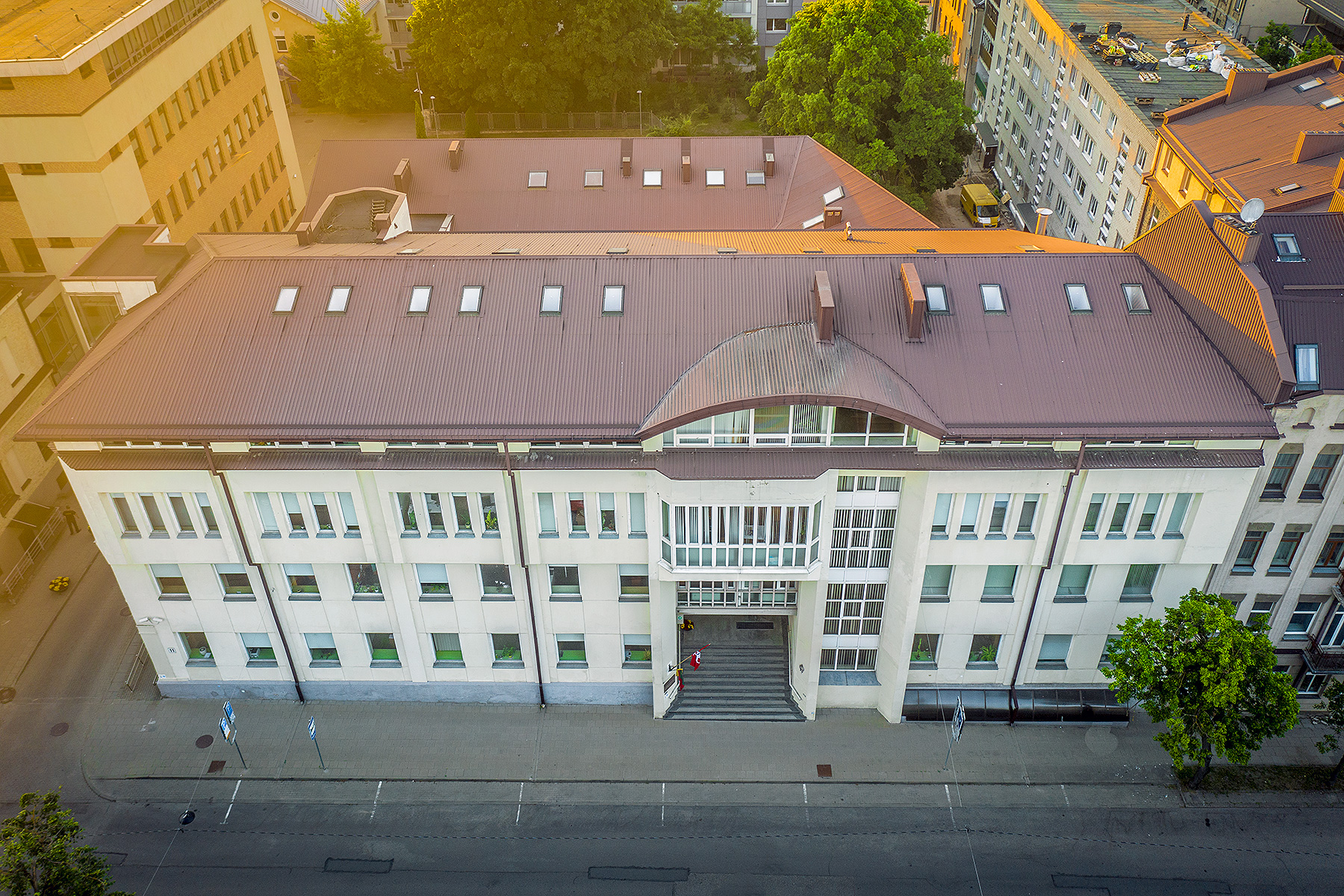
- Building of the Ministry of Social Security and Labour on A. Vivulskio Street in Vilnius

Ministry overview
- Formed: 17 January 1990; 36 years ago
- Jurisdiction: Government of Lithuania
- Headquarters: A. Vivulskio 11, Naujamiestis, 03610 Vilnius
- Employees: 242 permanent employees (January 2021)
- Annual budget: ▲€5.776 billion (2024)
- Minister responsible: Inga Ruginienė, 24th Minister for Social Security and Labour of Lithuania
- Website: socmin.lrv.lt

Footnotes
- 54°40′47.0″N 25°16′9.7″E

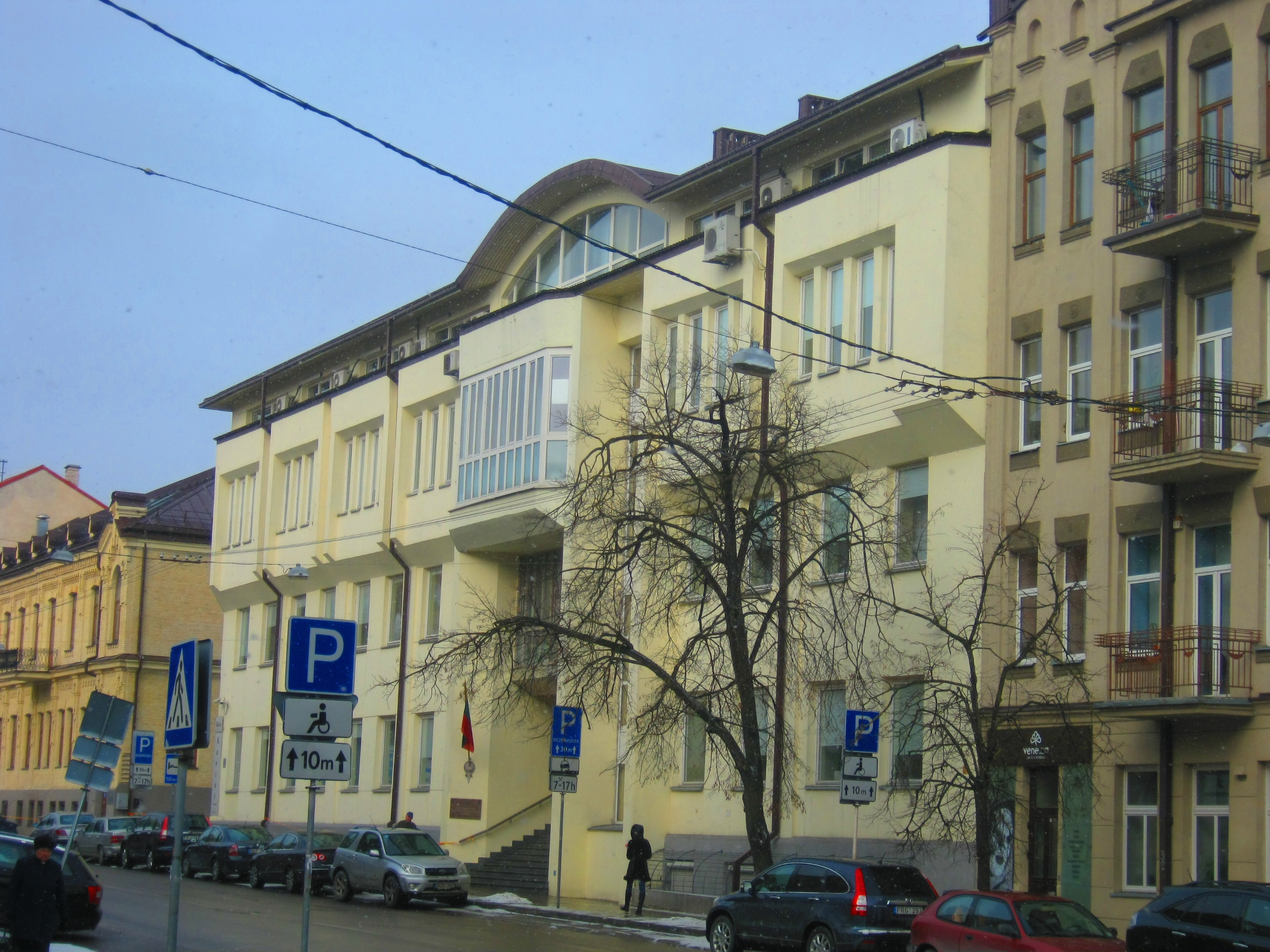

The Ministry of Social Security and Labour of the Republic of Lithuania (Lithuanian: Lietuvos Respublikos socialinės apsaugos ir darbo ministerija) is a government department of the Republic of Lithuania. Its operations are authorized by the Constitution of the Republic of Lithuania, decrees issued by the President and Prime Minister, and laws passed by the Seimas (Parliament). Its mission is to prosecute state social security and labour branch ruling functions and realize state policy in these branches. The current head of the Ministry is Jūratė Zailskienė.

== History ==
On 11 November 1918, the Republic of Lithuania established a short-lived Ministry of Public Works and Food Supply (Lithuanian: Viešųjų darbų ir maitinimo ministerija). Its purpose was to address the dire social situation following the devastation of the World War I. It had three departments: social security, food supply and labour. However, on 29 October 1919 the ministry was merged into the Ministry of the Interior and its original departments were reorganized several times during the interwar period. The ministry and its departments were early institutions concerning the social welfare and are considered to be the predecessors of the present day Ministry of Social Security and Labour.

== Function ==
The Ministry plays a critical role in addressing social inequalities and supporting vulnerable groups in Lithuania. The Minister is responsible for overseeing and developing policies related to social security, labor, and welfare. The Minister ensures the effective implementation of programs aimed at providing social protection, including pensions, unemployment benefits, and support for vulnerable groups. They regulate the labor market to ensure fair working conditions, safe workplaces, and equitable employment opportunities. The Minister also represents Lithuania in international forums concerning labor and social security matters, collaborating with EU institutions and international organizations. Additionally, the Minister advises the government and the president on social and labor-related issues, contributing to the development of national policies.

== Ministers ==
The Minister of Social Security and Labour (Lithuanian: Socialinės apsaugos ir darbo ministras) is a member of the executive branch of the Government of Lithuania. The minister is responsible for shaping and overseeing the country's social security, labor market, and welfare policies. The Minister leads the Ministry in developing and implementing programs aimed at improving social protection, ensuring fair labor conditions, and enhancing employment opportunities. The current incumbent is Inga Runginienė who took office on 12 December 2024.

Democratic Labour Party Homeland Union Labour Party Social Democratic Party Independent

Ministry of Social Security
Term	Minister	Party	Prime Mninister (Cabinet)	Office		
Term	Minister	Party	Prime Mninister (Cabinet)	Start date	End date	Time in office
1	Algis Dobravolskas (born 1951)	Independent	Kazimiera Prunskienė (Prunskienė)	17 January 1990	10 January 1991	358 days
2	Algis Dobravolskas (born 1951)	Independent	Albertas Šimėnas (Šimėnas)	10 January 1991	13 January 1991	3 days
3	Algis Dobravolskas (born 1951)	Independent	Gediminas Vagnorius (Vagnorius I)	13 January 1991	21 July 1992	1 year, 190 days
4	Teodoras Medaiskis (born 1951)	Independent	Aleksandras Abišala (Abišala)	21 July 1992	17 December 1992	149 days
5	Teodoras Medaiskis (born 1951)	Independent	Bronislovas Lubys (Lubys)	17 December 1992	31 March 1993	104 days
Ministry of Social Security and Labour
Term	Minister	Party	Prime Mninister (Cabinet)	Office		
Term	Minister	Party	Prime Mninister (Cabinet)	Start date	End date	Time in office
6	Teodoras Medaiskis (born 1951)	Independent	Adolfas Šleževičius (Šleževičius)	31 March 1993	28 October 1993	211 days
7	Laurynas Stankevičius (1935-2017)	Democratic Labour Party	Adolfas Šleževičius (Šleževičius)	28 October 1993	12 July 1994	257 days
8	Mindaugas Mikaila (born 1957)	Independent	Adolfas Šleževičius (Šleževičius)	12 July 1994	19 March 1996	1 year, 251 days
9	Mindaugas Mikaila (born 1957)	Independent	Laurynas Mindaugas Stankevičius (Stankevičius)	19 March 1996	10 December 1996	266 days
10	Irena Degutienė (born 1949)	Homeland Union	Gediminas Vagnorius (Vagnorius II)	10 December 1996	10 June 1999	2 years, 182 days
11	Irena Degutienė (born 1949)	Homeland Union	Rolandas Paksas (Paksas I)	10 June 1999	11 November 1999	154 days
12	Irena Degutienė (born 1949)	Homeland Union	Andrius Kubilius (Kubilius I)	11 November 1999	9 November 2000	364 days
13	Vilija Blinkevičiūtė (born 1960)	Social Democratic Party	Rolandas Paksas (Paksas II)	9 November 2000	12 July 2001	245 days
14	Vilija Blinkevičiūtė (born 1960)	Social Democratic Party	Algirdas Brazauskas (Brazauskas I)	12 July 2001	14 December 2004	3 years, 155 days
15	Vilija Blinkevičiūtė (born 1960)	Social Democratic Party	Algirdas Brazauskas (Brazauskas II)	14 December 2004	18 July 2006	1 year, 216 days
16	Vilija Blinkevičiūtė (born 1960)	Social Democratic Party	Gediminas Kirkilas (Kirkilas)	18 July 2006	9 December 2008	2 years, 144 days
17	Rimantas Dagys (born 1957)	Homeland Union	Andrius Kubilius (Kubilius II)	9 December 2008	22 July 2009	225 days
18	Donatas Jankauskas (born 1958)	Homeland Union	Andrius Kubilius (Kubilius II)	22 July 2009	13 December 2012	3 years, 144 days
19	Algimanta Pabedinskienė (born 1965)	Labour Party	Algirdas Butkevičius (Butkevičius)	13 December 2012	13 December 2016	4 years, 0 days
20	Linas Kukuraitis (born 1978)	Independent	Saulius Skvernelis (Skvernelis)	13 December 2016	11 December 2020	3 years, 364 days
21	Monika Navickienė (born 1981)	Homeland Union	Ingrida Šimonytė (Šimonytė)	11 December 2020	13 December 2024	4 years, 2 days
22	Inga Ruginienė (born 1981)	Social Democratic Party of Lithuania	Gintautas Paluckas (Paluckas)	13 December 2024	25 September 2025	1 year, 240 days
23	Jūratė Zailskienė (born 1965)	Social Democratic Party of Lithuania	Inga Ruginienė (Ruginienė)	25 September 2025	14 July 2026	318 days
23	Inga Ruginienė (born 1981)	Social Democratic Party of Lithuania	Inga Ruginienė (Sinkevičius)	14 July 2026	Incumbent	318 days
