= Juozas Olekas =

Lithuanian surgeon and politician

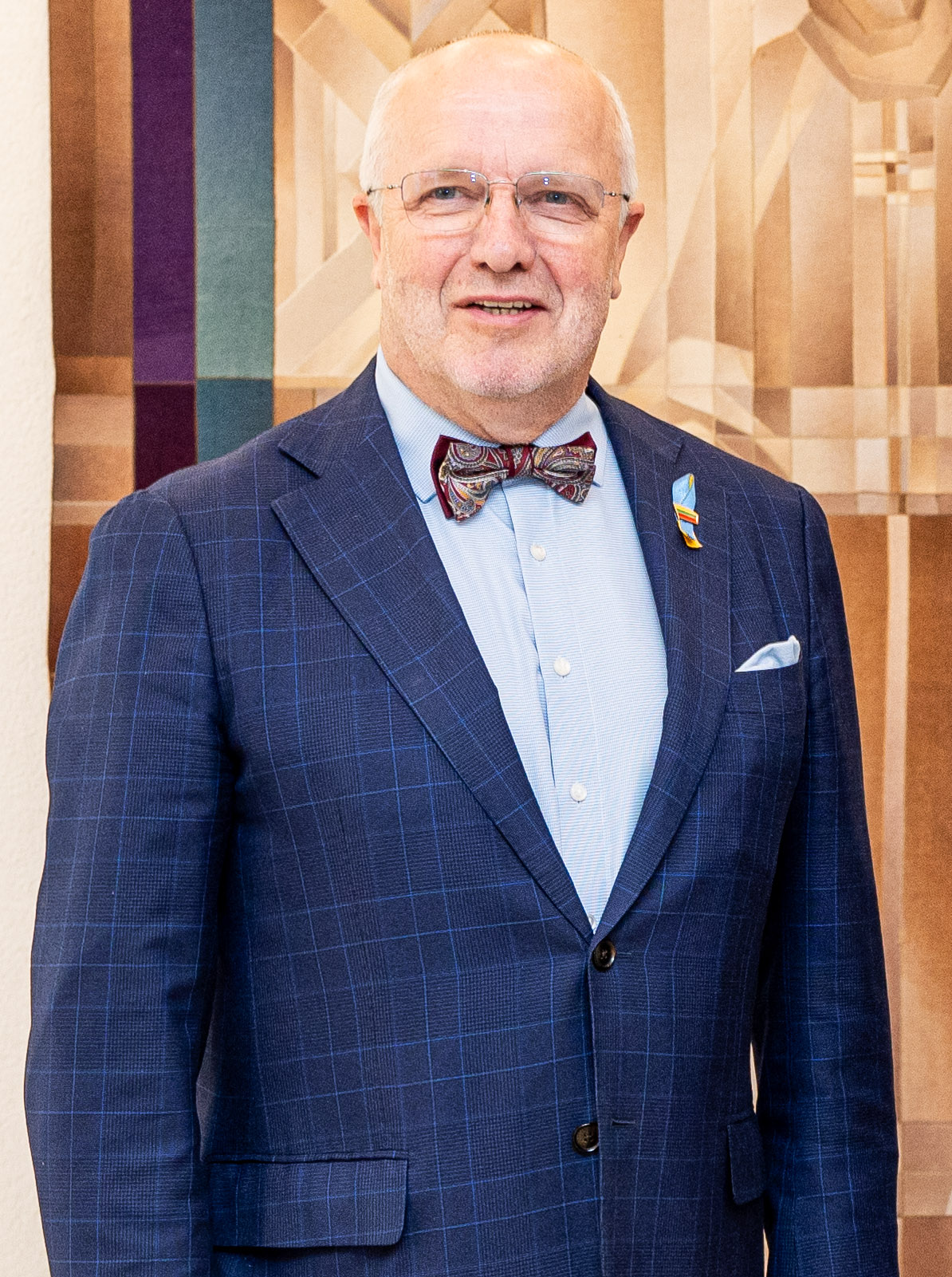
- Olekas in 2025

Speaker of the Seimas
- Caretaker
- Assumed office 10 September 2025
- President: Gitanas Nausėda
- Preceded by: Saulius Skvernelis

Member of the Seimas
- Incumbent
- Assumed office 27 October 2024

Member of the European Parliament
- In office 2 July 2019 – 15 July 2024
- Constituency: Lithuania

Minister of National Defence
- In office 13 December 2012 – 13 December 2016
- Prime Minister: Algirdas Butkevičius
- Preceded by: Rasa Juknevičienė
- Succeeded by: Raimundas Karoblis
- In office 4 July 2006 – 9 December 2008
- Prime Minister: Gediminas Kirkilas
- Preceded by: Gediminas Kirkilas
- Succeeded by: Rasa Juknevičienė

Personal details
- Born: 30 October 1955 (age 71) Bolshoy Ungut, Krasnoyarsk Krai, Soviet Union (now Russia)
- Party: LSDP (since 1989)
- Education: Lithuanian University of Health Sciences; Vilnius University

Juozas Olekas (born 30 October 1955) is a Lithuanian surgeon and politician, and the current Speaker of the Seimas. He is also a former Minister of National Defence, from 2006 to 2008. In 1990 and from 2003 to 2004 he also served as the Health Minister.

== Early life and career ==
He was born on October 30, 1955 in the village of Bolshoy Ungut, Krasnoyarsk Krai, in the RSFSR. In 1974, he graduated from Salomeja Neris Secondary School in Vilkaviškis. Olekas studied at Kaunas Institute of Medicine from 1974 to 1976, and at Vilnius University from 1976 to 1980. In 1987, he received his doctorate in medicine, and in 1989, he continued his studies at the University of Glasgow. In 1989, he was elected People's Deputy in the Congress of People's Deputies of the Soviet Union from the Vilkaviškis constituency of the Lithuanian SSR on the nomination of Sąjūdis. From 1990-1992, he served as the Minister of Health of Lithuania. Between 1994 and 1997 he was a chief physician at the Vilnius University hospital.

== In politics and government ==
From 1996 to 2012, he was a member of the Seimas of Lithuania. From 2006 to 2008, he was the Minister of Defence of Lithuania. In 2012, he again took up this post. Olekas was Vilija Blinkevičiūtė's main competitor in the 2021 Social Democratic Party of Lithuania leadership election, finishing second with 44% of the vote. In 2019 he was elected to the European Parliament. In 2025, he was seen as one of the most likely candidates (together with Mindaugas Sinkevičius, Robert Duchnevich and Inga Ruginienė) to replace former Prime minister Gintautas Paluckas. On 26 August 2025 he was named Speaker of the Seimas.

== Controversies ==
In 2004, 2016, he was implicated in corruption scandals, including the so-called Golden Spoons scandal in the system of the ministry subordinate to Olekas. . According to telephone conversations recorded by the Special Investigation Service (STT), while working as Minister of Health, Olekas, together with the then Mayor of Vilnius Artūras Zuokas, helped the Rubicon Group's close company "Vilniaus Energija", which owns the company Vilnius Heat Networks, avoid competition in Santariškės, when other businessmen wanted to build a gas boiler house there. The STT recorded that after the proposal for a new boiler house, the then Minister of Health J. Olekas arranged to meet with the head of UAB Rubicon Group Andrius Janukonis at his home. Upon receiving this information, the then Prime Minister Algirdas Brazauskas immediately recalled his subordinate Minister of Health from vacation so that the prosecutor's office could question Olekas. In addition, in one of those conversations between A. Janukonis and his business partner Gintautas Jaugielavičius, information was recorded about possible pressure from Olekas, on Valdemaras Anužis, a member of the Klaipėda Municipal Council and Chairman of the Economy Committee.

As a member of the Seimas, Juozas Olekas visited a Polish ski resort on 15 February 2010 with the head of the State Health Insurance Fund, Algis Sasnauskas, who was at the time suspected of abuse of office by the STT; Sasnauskas was not working at the time of the skiing trip due to an alleged illness, as he had a certificate of incapacity issued by a doctor.

== Personal life ==
Olekas is married to Aurelija Olekienė, they have two daughters and one son. He speaks Lithuanian, English and Russian. In 1999, he fatally injured two pedestrians on the Kaunas-Vilnius highway, but managed to avoid liability. His hobbies include tennis, football, beekeeping, hunting, dancing.

== Awards and prizes ==
- Commander of the Order of Orange-Nassau (2008, Netherlands)
- Medal of Independence of Lithuania (2000)
- Order of the Cross of Terra Mariana, 2nd class (2013, Estonia)
- Grand Cordon of the Order of the Rising Sun (2026, Japan)
