= Rimantė Šalaševičiūtė =

Lithuanian politician

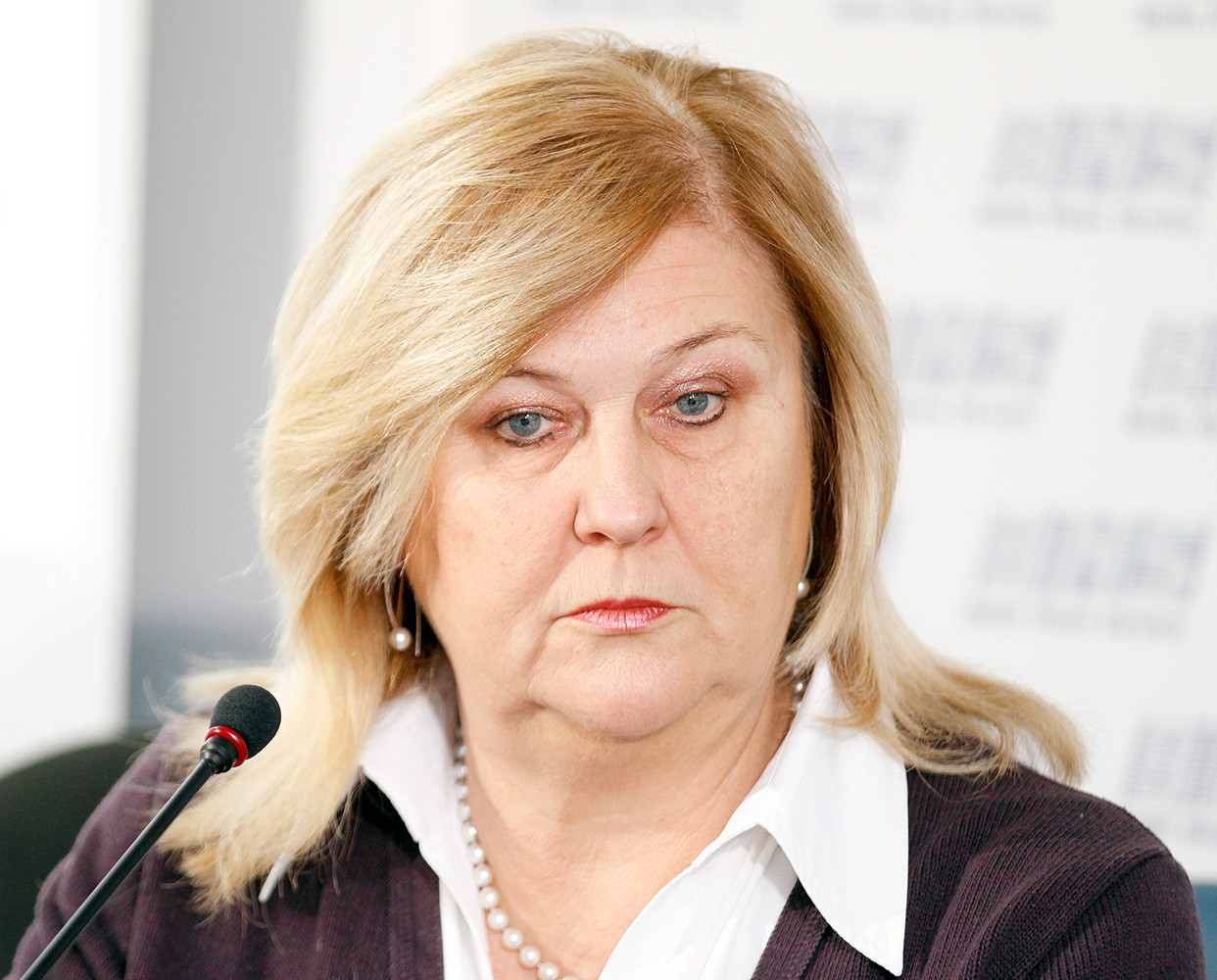
- Rimantė Šalaševičiūtė in 2011

Member of the Seimas
- Incumbent
- Assumed office 17 November 2012
- Constituency: Multi-member

Minister of Health of Lithuania
- In office 17 July 2014 – 17 February 2016
- President: Dalia Grybauskaitė
- Prime Minister: Algirdas Butkevičius
- Preceded by: Vytenis Andriukaitis
- Succeeded by: Juras Požela

Personal details
- Born: 25 February 1954 (age 72) Varniai, Lithuanian SSR
- Party: LSDP (2012–2017)
- Other political affiliations: LDDP (1990–2001); Communist Party (1986–1990)
- Education: Vilnius University

Rimantė Šalaševičiūtė (born 25 February 1954 in Varniai, Soviet Union) is a Lithuanian politician and lawyer, ombudsman, and political and public figure.

== Biography ==
From 1971 to 1976, Šalaševičiūtė studied at the Vilnius University Faculty of Law. She taught at many different universities before becoming a politician.

From 1990 to 1995, she was the Vilnius City Council Secretariat Secretary-consultant. From 1995 to 2003, she was a Seimas ombudsman advisor, and from 2003 to 2005, she was a Seimas Ombudsman herself. She was also a Lithuanian national UNICEF board member. She was a member of the Seimas from 2012 to 2016, and, from 2014 to 2016, in the government of Algirdas Butkevičius, the Minister of Health of Lithuania. From 2001 onward, she is a member of the Lithuanian Social Democratic Party. In February 2016, however, she stepped down from both the Seimas and as the Minister of Health after she publicly admitted to giving a bribe to a doctor.
