= Algimanta Pabedinskienė =

Lithuanian politician

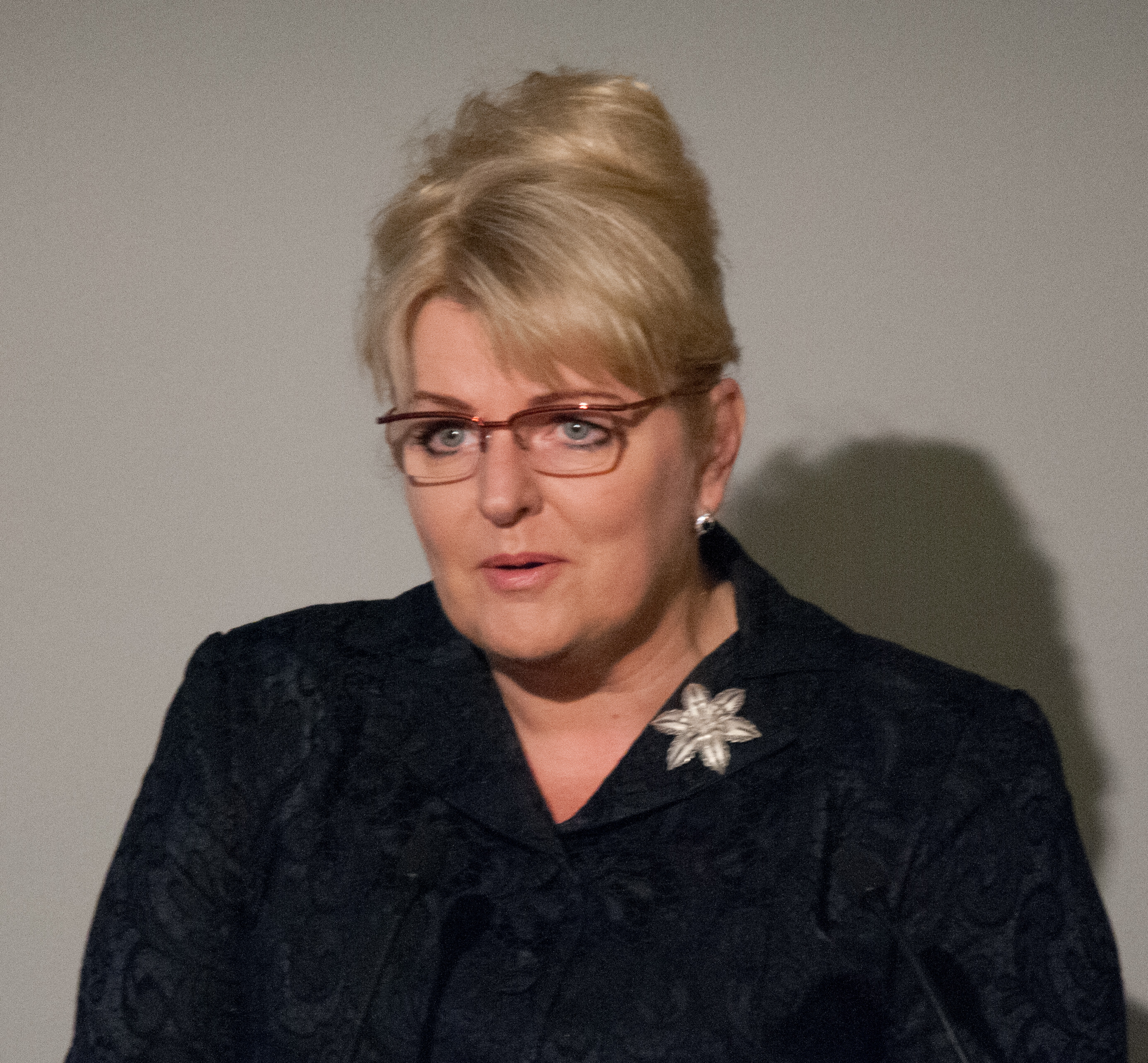

Ministry of Social Security and Labour
- In office 12 December 2012 – 13 December 2016
- Prime Minister: Algirdas Butkevičius
- Preceded by: Donatas Jankauskas
- Succeeded by: Linas Kukuraitis

Personal details
- Born: 25 March 1965 (age 61) Liepāja, Latvian SSR
- Party: Labour Party
- Education: Vilnius Gediminas Technical University

Algimanta Pabedinskienė (born 25 March 1965) is a Lithuanian politician who served as Ministry of Social Security and Labour from 12 December 2012 to 13 December 2016. Born in Latvia, Pabedinskienė moved to Lithuania at a young age, graduating from high school in Marijampolė, then graduating from Vilnius Gediminas Technical University with a degree in civil engineering. After graduating, she began her own construction business, and through the 1990s created a workshop of women's accessories as well. In 2005, she returned to school and graduated from Kaunas University of Technology with a degree in business administration, and served both as a lecturer at Marijampolė University of Applied Sciences and as an administrator in the Kaunas Chamber of Commerce after graduating.

Pabedinskienė began to get involved in politics shortly after joining the Chamber of Commerce. In 2008 and in 2012, she ran for a seat in the Seimas as a member of the Labour Party, but was unsuccessful both times. Despite the loss, she was nominated to the cabinet position of Ministry of Social Security and Labour. After her term ended, she returned to her prior work as a lecturer and Chamber member.
