= Paulius Visockas =

Lithuanian politician (born 1975)

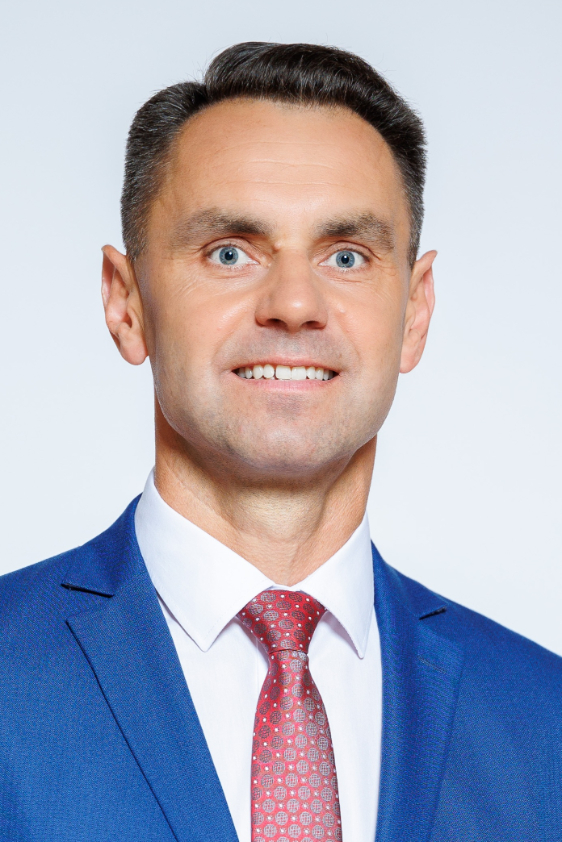

Member of the Seimas
- Incumbent
- Assumed office 19 November 2024
- Constituency: Multi-member

Personal details
- Born: 21 October 1975 (age 50) Kaunas, Lithuania (de facto Lithuanian SSR, Soviet Union)
- Party: Social Democratic Party
- Education: Lithuanian Academy of Physical Education

Paulius Visockas (born 21 October 1975) is a Lithuanian politician of the Social Democratic Party serving as a member of the Seimas since 2024. He has served as deputy mayor of the Kaunas District Municipality since 2017.

== Education ==
Paulius Visockas was born on 21 October 1975 in Kaunas. He graduated from Ežerėlis secondary school in 1993, then proceeded to study physical education at the Lithuanian Academy of Physical Education, earning a bachelor's in 1997 and a master's in 1999. He worked as an instructor at the Ugnė Karvelis Gymnasium in Akademija from 1997 to 2017.

== Political career ==
He has served on the council of Kaunas District Municipality since 2015, becoming deputy mayor of the municipality in 2017.

In the 2024 Lithuanian parliamentary election, Visockas's position on the Social Democrats' party list was initially just below the threshold to earn a seat in the Seimas. Due to the decision of party chair Vilija Blinkevičiūtė to remain in the European Parliament and forego membership in the Seimas, her seat was instead assigned to Visockas. He was sworn in on 19 November 2024.

== Personal life ==
He is married to Eglė Visockienė. Besides his native Lithuanian, Visockas speaks proficient English and Russian, as well as basic Polish. His hobbies include sports, travel, and active leisure. He has been involved in coaching and organizing sporting competitions.
