= Vytenis Andriukaitis =

Lithuanian physician/politician

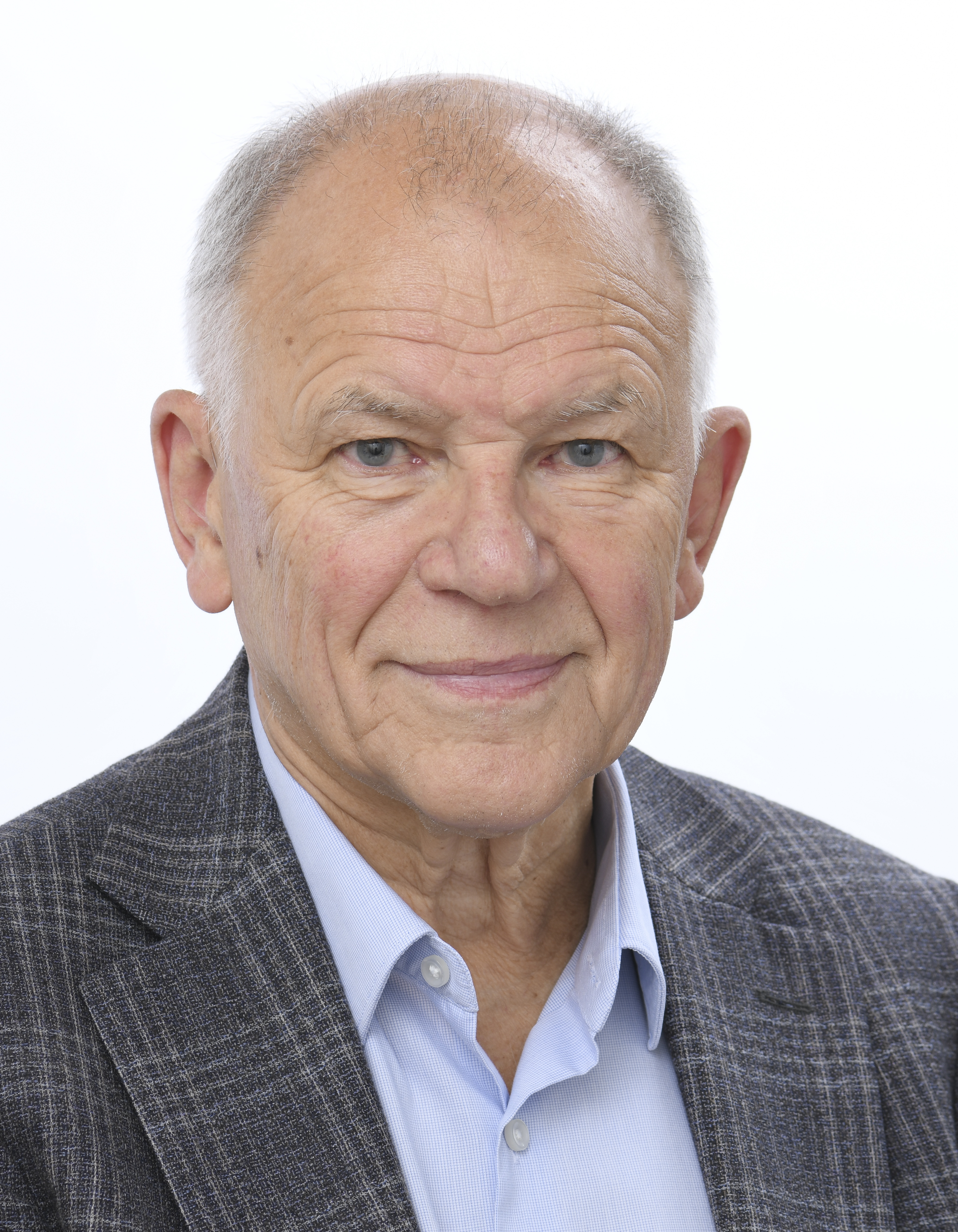
- Official portrait, 2024

Member of the European Parliament
- Incumbent
- Assumed office July 2024

European Commissioner for Health and Food Safety
- In office 1 November 2014 – 30 November 2019
- Commission: Juncker
- Preceded by: Tonio Borg (Health)
- Succeeded by: Stella Kyriakidou

Minister of Health
- In office 13 December 2012 – 14 July 2014
- Prime Minister: Algirdas Butkevičius
- Preceded by: Raimondas Šukys
- Succeeded by: Rimantė Šalaševičiūtė

Member of Seimas
- In office 16 November 2012 – 15 September 2014
- Preceded by: Vilija Aleknaitė-Abramikienė
- Succeeded by: Šarūnas Gustainis
- Constituency: Žirmūnai
- In office 17 November 2008 – 15 November 2012
- Constituency: Multi-member
- In office 24 November 1992 – 27 July 2004
- Preceded by: Constituency created
- Succeeded by: Algis Čaplikas
- Constituency: Žirmūnai

Personal details
- Born: Vytenis Povilas Andriukaitis; 9 August 1951 (age 74) Kyusyur, Yakut ASSR, Russian SFSR, Soviet Union (now Sakha Republic, Russia)
- Party: Social Democratic Party of Lithuania (1989–present; suspended since 2014)
- Spouse: Irena Meižytė
- Children: 3
- Education: Lithuanian University of Health Sciences; Vilnius University
- Vytenis Andriukaitis's voice Andriukaitis delivering the 2019 State of Health in the EU report Recorded 28 November 2019

Vytenis Povilas Andriukaitis (born 9 August 1951) is a Lithuanian physician and politician of the Social Democratic Party serving as a member of the European Parliament since 2024. A heart surgeon by profession, he previously served as European Commissioner for Health and Food Safety in the Juncker Commission from 2014 to 2019. Andriukaitis was a co-signatory to the 1990 Act of the Re-Establishment of the State of Lithuania

Andriukaitis' family was deported to Siberia in June 1941. He, his mother and two older brothers were allowed to return to Lithuania in 1958; his father returned in 1959. After excelling at school, he enrolled at Kaunas Medical Institute, graduating in 1975. In 1976 Andriukaitis started his career in politics as a member of the underground Social Democrat movement, but later continued his studies by pursuing a degree in history at Vilnius University, graduating in 1984.

Andriukaitis was elected to the Supreme Council of the Republic of Lithuania, which preceded Seimas (Lithuanian Parliament), in 1990. Andriukaitis was a member of the Lithuanian Parliament for six terms, from 1992 to 2004 and from 2008 to 2012, and was a deputy chairman of its council from 2001 to 2004. He was a health minister of the Republic of Lithuania since December 2012 until the European Commission President Jean-Claude Juncker appointed him to serve as an EU Commissioner in November 2014. After the term as European Commissioner for Health and Food Safety Andriukaitis became WHO Special Envoy for the European region in March 2020 and in July 2024 he became a member of the European Parliament.

== Early life ==
Vytenis Povilas Andriukaitis was born in Kyusyur, Yakut Autonomous Soviet Socialist Republic, USSR. His father, Alfonsas Andriukaitis and mother Liuda Andriukaitienė, pregnant at the time, together with two small children were deported from Lithuania to Siberia by Soviet Communists in June 1941. While there, they only had access to Russian literature; Andriukaitis learned Lithuanian from his mother, who would write down Lithuanian fairy tales, which he would later read.

In 1954, the family received a permission to relocate to Olyokminsk in continental USSR. In 1957, they were allowed to return to Lithuania after his mother was awarded a medal of honour for raising five children. The family moved to Kaunas, Lithuania – he, his mother and two brothers, Antanas and Petras, joined later by their father Alfonsas in 1959. His older brothers were serving in the USSR Army – Šarūnas in Kaliningrad and Remigijus in Vladivostok.

Andriukaitis excelled at school and was awarded a "Gold medal" upon his graduation from Kaunas Middle School in 1969. It was uncommon to be awarded a medal of achievement without being a member of the "komjaunuoliai" (Young Communists). Right after graduation, he enrolled at Kaunas Medicine Institute graduating in 1975. He continued his studies, pursuing a degree in history at Vilnius University, graduating in 1984. He did not join the Communist party during his university years and was instead a member of the underground Social Democratic movement for independent Lithuania.

== Medical career ==
In 1975 Andriukaitis started his medical internship at Kaunas 3rd Hospital. Following the internship, he was denied the right to choose the hospital for residency by security services due to his anti-communist political involvement. He was offered to go to Ignalina, in north-east part of the country, where Andriukaitis spent eight years at Ignalina Central Hospital. He was under continuous pressure and scrutiny from the government, due to his involvement in underground political resistance movement. Whilst in Ignalina, in 1979 he qualified in general surgery at Vilnius University; in 1980 he qualified in war surgery at Riga Military Hospital, in 1982 in abdominal surgery and in 1983 in trauma and orthopaedics surgery both at Vilnius University. After being promoted to surgeon (second category) in 1983, and due to a great demand for cardio-surgeons in Vilnius, Andriukaitis was able to relocate there from Ignalina and was appointed a cardiac surgeon at the Cardiac Surgery Centre at the Republican Clinical hospital in Vilnius, Lithuania. In 1987 he qualified in heart and vascular surgery at Moscow Bakulev Cardiovascular Institute and in the same year he took part in the first heart transplantation in the history of Lithuanian medicine. In 1989 Andriukaitis was appointed a cardiovascular surgeon (first category) and became a member of the Lithuanian Physicians' Association (until 1996) and Lithuanian Cardiologists' Association. He was also a member of International Physicians' Association during 1998–2004. Andriukaitis practiced medicine until 1993, when the new Constitution of Lithuania forbade Members of Parliament to take part in other non-parliamentary activities.

== Political career ==
=== Under Soviet rule ===
Andriukaitis was an active participant in the anti-Soviet underground movement. In 1976 Andriukaitis started his career in politics as a member of the underground Social Democratic movement, participating in their many activities. He was a founder of the University of Antanas Strazdelis, an underground "university", where members of the resistance movement studied works of the prohibited authors, exchanged books from personal libraries and practiced a humanist way of life (1975–1982). The "university" rejected dictatorship, nazism, fascism, autocratic regimes or nationalism and united students by promoting values of democracy, pluralism, multi-party politics, freedom of ideas, philosophy and religion and diversity.

In 1976 Andriukaitis was arrested and questioned by the KGB, and forced by the Soviet government to not leave Ignalina for three years, where he was under supervision by the local KGB office.

During 1988–1989 Andriukaitis actively supported the restoration of the LSDP (Social Democratic Party of Lithuania). As a deputy chairman of LSDP, he pioneered the re-establishment of its steering group, was also a member of the Lithuanian Reform Movement Sąjūdis and participated in the preparation and legalisation of LSDP Lithuanian Movement programmes for elections to the Lithuanian SSR Supreme Council. During this period he was also a member of the working group for the development of the strategy for LSSR self-sufficiency (in regards to social security, health care reform and public administration).

=== After Soviet occupation ===
In 1990 Andriukaitis was elected a Supreme Soviet Deputy for Lithuanian Republic, a chair he held until 1992. He was also a member of the Committee of Health and Social Affairs, chairman of Health Subcommittee, member of a working group which prepared the charter of March 11 in advance of the 1990 signing of the Act of the Re-Establishment of the State of Lithuania. He was also a member of a working group on National Science and National Health Concept Development during these years.

In 1990 he became a delegation member in the Baltic Assembly at the Parliament of the Republic of Lithuania, the position he held until 2004.

Andriukaitis was also one of the co-authors of the Constitution of the Republic of Lithuania, which was adopted in 1992.

=== Member of Parliament ===
In 1992, Andriukaitis became a Member of Parliament of the Republic of Lithuania, a vice-chairman of Health and Social Affairs Committee, the deputy chair (seniūnas) of the Lithuanian Social Democratic Party Parliamentary Group, and a member of the National Security Concept Development Working Group. In 1996, he was re-elected as a Member of Parliament where he was renamed a member of the Conference of Chairs of Parliamentary Groups and of the State and Local Government Committee, Polish Parliamentary Assembly and as a chair of LSDP Parliamentary Group.

Andriukaitis was a candidate for the president of the Republic of Lithuania in 1997, and also in 2002.

In 1999 Andriukaitis was elected an LSDP chairman, serving two years.

In 2000, Andriukaitis was elected for his third term as a Member of Parliament of Lithuania and continued as a member of the Conference of Chairs of Parliamentary Groups and also joined Parliamentary Council. In October 2000, he was an Opposition Leader in the Parliament. In 2001 he became a deputy chairman of the Parliament, responsible for the coordination of parliamentary committees as well as the European Integration program, including the planning and management of human and financial resources, a chairman of the European Affairs Committee, a member of Foreign Affairs Committee and Legal Affairs, NATO Commission, and later a replacement member on the Commission on the Constitution of the Republic of Lithuania.

In 2002, Andriukaitis founded Lithuanian Forum for the Future. He also became a member of Convention on the Future of Europe and leader of the Lithuanian delegation.

After some allegations of corruption, on 28 July 2004 Andriukaitis voluntarily resigned from his parliamentary seat, even though the Parliament had earlier refused to revoke his parliamentary immunity, stating that any allegations were unjustified. He decided to not hinder the law enforcement authorities in carrying out an investigation in order to clear his name. Lithuanian Prosecutor General's Office terminated the pre-trial investigation once the accusation proved to be an unfounded smear. On 6 September 2005 Andriukaitis won the legal proceedings against the former Prosecutor General of the Republic of Lithuania when the latter publicly apologized for his words about the allegations. The case was closed with a settlement agreement.

Andriukaitis was elected for his fourth term as an MP in 2008 and was appointed a deputy chairman of the Committee on European Affairs; he remained a member of the Foreign Affairs Committee and a vice-chairman of LSDP.

In 2012, Andriukaitis was appointed a Lithuanian Minister of Health in the 16th Lithuanian Government.

=== European politics ===
In 1994 Andriukaitis became a delegate in the Council of Europe Parliamentary Assembly for the Lithuanian Parliament, also a Parliamentary Assembly Member of the Council of Europe's Human Rights and Legal Affairs Committee. In 2001, as a deputy chairman of the Lithuanian Parliament, he was responsible for the European Integration Program, including the planning and management of human and financial resources. He was also a chairman of the European Affairs Committee.

On 10 September 2014 Andriukaitis was appointed by the European Commission President Jean-Claude Juncker as the European Commissioner-designate responsible for Health and Food Safety. In March 2016, he was also appointed by the United Nations Secretary-General Ban Ki-moon to the High-Level Commission on Health Employment and Economic Growth, which was co-chaired by presidents François Hollande of France and Jacob Zuma of South Africa.

Shortly after the United Kingdom's 2016 vote to withdraw from the European Union, Nigel Farage gave a speech including a statement that members of the EU parliament had never "done a proper job in their lives". A video of Andriukaitis covering his face with his hand at that remark went viral. He later published a blog entry explaining his objections to the speech.

Andriukaitis was elected in the 2024 European Parliament election, he is a member of ENVI committee, a coordinator in SANT committee and a substitute in AFCO committee.

In November 2024, Andriukaitis was one of only seven members of the 105-strong Lithuanian Social Democratic Party council to vote in opposition to a coalition with the nationalist party Dawn of Nemunas, whose founder Remigijus Žemaitaitis is known for antisemitic statements.

== Honours ==
=== Decorations ===
- Commander, Order of the Lithuanian Grand Duke Gediminas (2004)
- Grand Cross, Order of Merit of Portugal (2003).
- Officer, National Order of the Legion of Honour of France (2015).
- Doctor Honoris Causa by State University for Medicine and Pharmacy of the Republic of Moldova

=== Awards ===
- 1996 – 1991 January 13 Commemorative Medal.
- 2000 – Lithuanian Independence 10th Anniversary Medal.
- 2002 – Baltic Assembly Medal (for supporting Baltic unity and cooperation).
- 2004 – Commemorative Medal of Lithuania's accession to the European Union.
- 2004 – Upon Lithuania's accession to NATO: a memorable statue of “Gražina”.
- 2004 – Honorary Fellow of the Lithuanian Law University.
- 2005 – Honorary Badge of Doctor of Merit of Lithuania (as one of the initiators of the development of the Lithuanian national health concept and the Lithuanian legal framework for the health system).
- 2010 – Lithuanian Restoration of Independence 20th Anniversary Medal.
- 2012 – Constitutional Cup – nominal Constitution – for the development of the Constitution awarded by the Faculty of Law of Vilnius University on the occasion of the 20th anniversary of the Constitution of the Republic of Lithuania.
- 2013 – Commemorative Award of the President of the Republic of Lithuania for the personal contribution to the Lithuanian Presidency of the Council of the European Union in 2013.
- 2014 – Award of the Parliament of the Republic of Lithuania for the contribution to Lithuania's membership in the EU and its strengthening.
- 2014 – vice-president of the 67th World Health Assembly nominated by the Regional Office for Europe of the World Health Organization.
- 2014 – Award of the World Health Organization for the merits in the area of tobacco control.
- 2017 – Honorary Membership by Mykolas Romeris University

== Publications ==
- 1990–2004 author of more than 140 legislative proposals and amendments.
- 2002–2003 author and co-author of the contributions to the Convention on the Future of Europe.
- 1990–2004 co-author and editor of the publications of the Parliament of the Republic of Lithuania and the Parliamentary Committee on European Affairs:
  - The Parliament's role in the Lithuania's road to the European Union;
  - The role of Parliament in EU membership conditions;
  - 1997–2003 Joint Inter-parliamentary Committee on Accession to the EU — The Overview of Lithuanian Activities;
  - Input to the publications to commemorate the 20th anniversary of the Baltic Freedom in the margins of the Conference “Baltic freedom: The West's approach to 1983 January 13th European Parliament resolution 'on the situation in Estonia, Latvia and Lithuania'”;
  - Materials for the "International Conference on National Constitution in the context of EU enlargement";
  - Materials, including a declaration in the International Conference on the EU enlargement and the wider European vision;
  - Debates on the future of Europe.
- In 2006 “Social Democrats in Lithuanian Parliaments”.
- In 2023 co-author and editor of "A European Health Union. A Blueprint for Generations".

Political offices
Preceded by Algirdas Šemeta	Lithuanian European Commissioner; 2014–2019	Succeeded by Virginijus Sinkevičius
Preceded by Tonio Borg as European Commissioner for Health	European Commissioner for Health and Food Safety; 2014–2019	Succeeded by Stella Kyriakidou as European Commissioner for Health
