= Vilija Blinkevičiūtė =

Lithuanian lawyer and politician

Vilija Blinkevičiūtė MEP
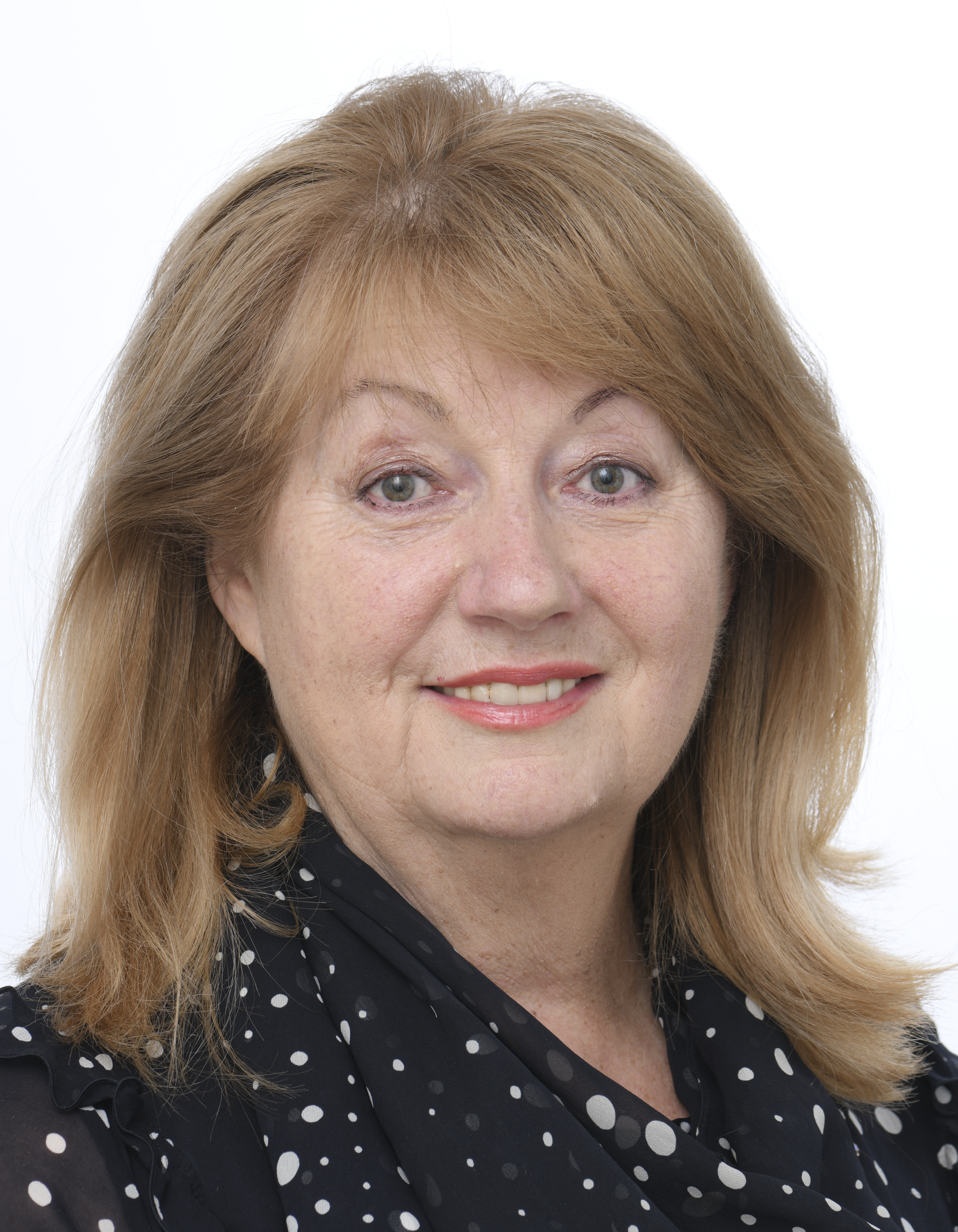
- Official portrait, 2024

Leader of the Social Democratic Party
- In office 29 May 2021 – 17 May 2025
- Preceded by: Gintautas Paluckas
- Succeeded by: Gintautas Paluckas

Member of the European Parliament
- Incumbent
- Assumed office 14 July 2009
- Constituency: Lithuania

Member of the Seimas
- In office 17 November 2008 – 28 June 2009
- Constituency: Multi-member
- In office 15 November 2004 – 17 November 2008
- Constituency: Šeškinė

Minister for Social Security and Labour
- In office 9 November 2000 – 9 December 2008
- Prime Minister: Rolandas Paksas; Algirdas Brazauskas; Gediminas Kirkilas
- Preceded by: Irena Degutienė
- Succeeded by: Rimantas Dagys

Personal details
- Born: 3 March 1960 (age 66) Linkuva, Lithuanian SSR, Soviet Union
- Party: LSDP (2006–present)
- Other political affiliations: NS (2000–2006)
- Education: Vilnius University
- Occupation: Lawyer • Politician
- Website: EU Personal Profile

Vilija Blinkevičiūtė (born 3 March 1960) is a Lithuanian lawyer and politician, Member of the European Parliament and former long-term Minister for Social Security and Labour. Blinkevičiūtė is a member of the Social Democratic Party of Lithuania since 2006.

In 2024, Blinkevičiūtė led the Social Democratic Party of Lithuania in the parliamentary elections, where the party emerged as the largest faction in the Seimas. However, in an unexpected announcement in October 2024, she declared that she would not pursue the role of Prime Minister of Lithuania, opting instead to continue serving as a Member of the European Parliament.

== Early life and education ==
Blinkevičiūtė was born in Linkuva, Lithuania. After graduation with honours from Linkuva Secondary School, she entered law faculty of the Vilnius State University, from which she graduated in 1983, having obtained the qualification of Master of Laws.

== Political career ==
Since 1983, Blinkevičiūtė has dedicated all her professional life to working in the Ministry of Social Security and Labour until she turned to politics and became a Vice Minister of Social Security and Labour in 1996.

In 2000 Blinkevičiūtė was appointed as Minister for Social Security and Labour, first in the government of Prime Minister Rolandas Paksas. She remained in the post until 2008.

Between 2004 and 2009 Blinkevičiūtė was member of Seimas.

In 2021 she won the 2021 Social Democratic Party of Lithuania leadership election and became the chairwoman of the Lithuanian Social Democratic Party.

=== 2008 financial crisis ===
Just before the 2008 financial crisis, she was the Minister of Social Security and Labour. The Budget and Finance Committee of Seimas, established 11 years later, which investigated the causes of the crisis, accused Blinkevičiūtė of "reckless increase of pensions" and violations of fiscal discipline, which contributed to the deep economic recession in the country.

=== Member of the European Parliament, 2009–present ===
Blinkevičiūtė was elected to the European Parliament in 2009 and in 2014, as the representative of the Social Democratic Party of Lithuania. In the European Parliament, she belongs to the Group of the Progressive Alliance of Socialists and Democrats.

Following the 2014 elections, Blinkevičiūtė became a vice-chair of the Committee on Women's Rights and Gender Equality (FEMM); she was elected the chair of the committee in January 2017.

In addition, Blinkevičiūtė is a full member of the Committee on Employment and Social Affairs (EMPL) and of the Delegation to Euronest Parliamentary Assembly, and a substitute member of the Civil Liberties, Justice and Home Affairs Committee. She also belongs to the Intergroup on Disability and the Intergroup on Children's Rights and to the Intergroup on Extreme Poverty and Human Rights.

=== 2024 Lithuanian parliamentary election ===
In 2024, Blinkevičiūtė led the Social Democrats to victory in the parliamentary elections. She announced her intention to form a government as party leader. However, on 30 October 2024, Blinkevičiutė unexpectedly declared that she would not be her party's candidate for Prime Minister of Lithuania. She proposed her deputy, Gintautas Paluckas, instead.

During the election campaign, Blinkevičiūtė had frequently suggested that she would assume the office of Prime Minister if her party were successful. However, in explaining her decision not to take up the Prime Minister's post, Blinkevičiūtė cited age, health considerations, and the intense pressures associated with the position. Nonetheless, she resisted calls to step down from her position as a Member of the European Parliament and confirmed her intention to serve her term there until its conclusion in 2029. Her unprecedented move decision not to become Prime Minister caused controversy, and many Lithuanian public figures accused Blinkevičiūtė of deceiving the voters.

Although Blinkevičiūtė secured a seat in the Seimas, she passed it up to continue her work in the European Parliament. Her Seimas seat instead went to Kaunas District Municipality deputy mayor Paulius Visockas, the next candidate in the LSDP party list.

== Recognition ==
In 2004 Blinkevičiūtė was bestowed with the Cross of Commander of the Order for Merits to Lithuania.
