= Aloyzas Sakalas =

Lithuanian politician (1931–2022)

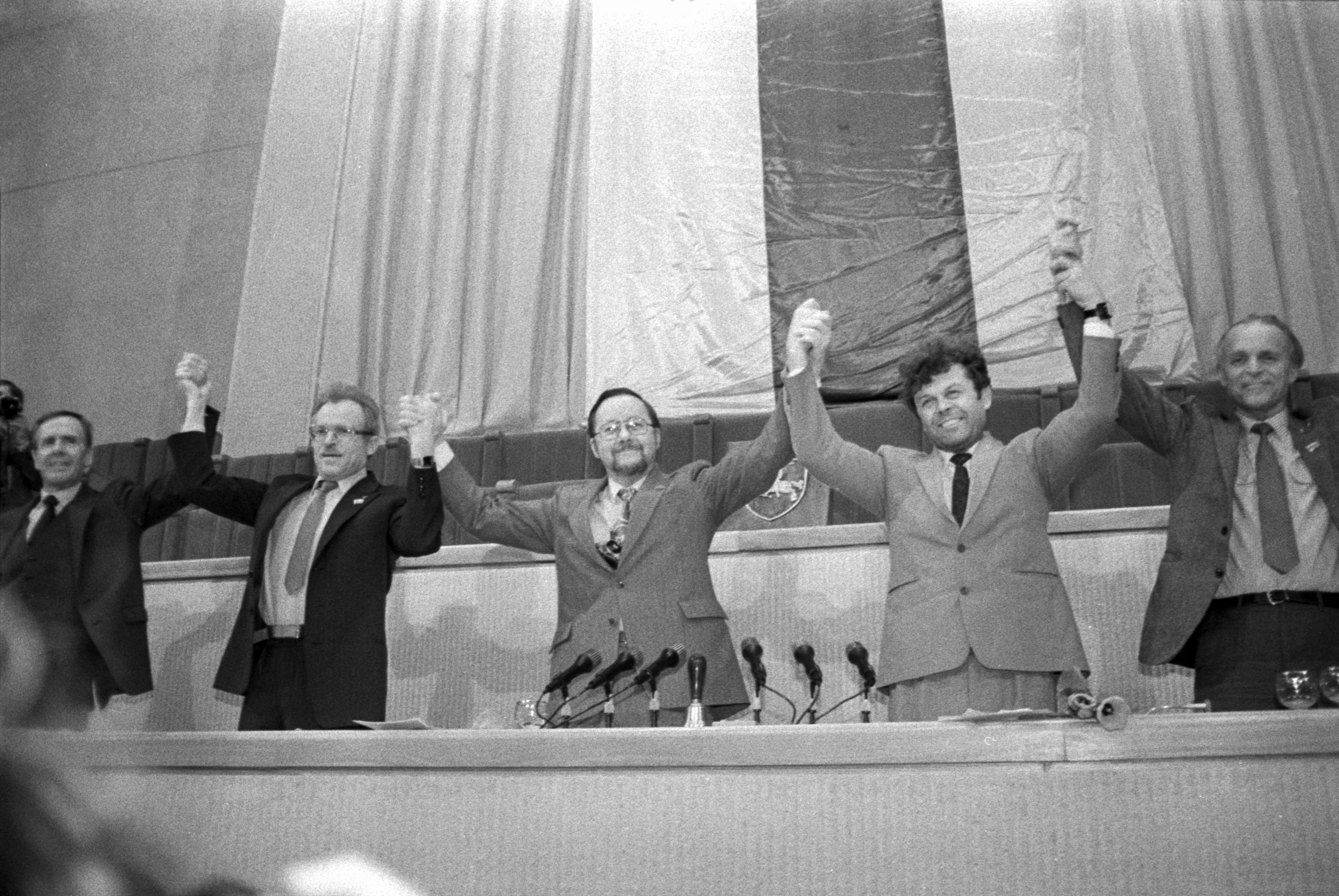
Aloyzas Sakalas (first from the right) on 11 March 1990, after the promulgation of the Act of the Re-Establishment of the State of Lithuania

Aloyzas Sakalas (6 July 1931 – 18 July 2022) was a Lithuanian politician, signatory of the Act of the Re-Establishment of the State of Lithuania, and Member of the European Parliament with the Social Democratic Party of Lithuania. Aloyzas Sakalas was also a part of the Socialist Group and sat on the European Parliament's Committee on Legal Affairs.

Aloyzas Sakalas was a substitute for the Committee on Foreign Affairs and a member of the Delegation for relations with Belarus. He had three children.

== Education ==
- 1960: Degree in radio engineering from the Kaunas Polytechnic Institute
- 1969: Doctorate from Vilnius State University
- 1972: Associate Professor
- 1977: Qualification as a professor of Physics and Mathematics
- 1980: Professor at the University of Vilnius

== Career ==
- 1960–1962: Engineer at the Institute for Electrographics
- 1982–1990: Lecturer of the Associate Professor and Professor at the University of Vilnius
- 1989–1991: Member of the Lithuanian Social Democratic Party (LDSP)
- 1991–1999: Chairman of the LSDP
- since 1999: Honorary Chairman of the LSDP
- 1990–1992: Chairman of the Committee on the Verification of Credentials of the Parliament of the Republic of Lithuania
- 1992–1996: Deputy President of Parliament
- 1996–2004: Member of Parliament
- 2000–2004: Chairman of the Parliament's Committee on Legal Affairs
- 1996–2004: Chairman of the organisation 'Help Lithuanian Children'

== See also ==
- 2004 European Parliament election in Lithuania
