= Jūratė Zailskienė =

Lithuanian politician (born 1965)

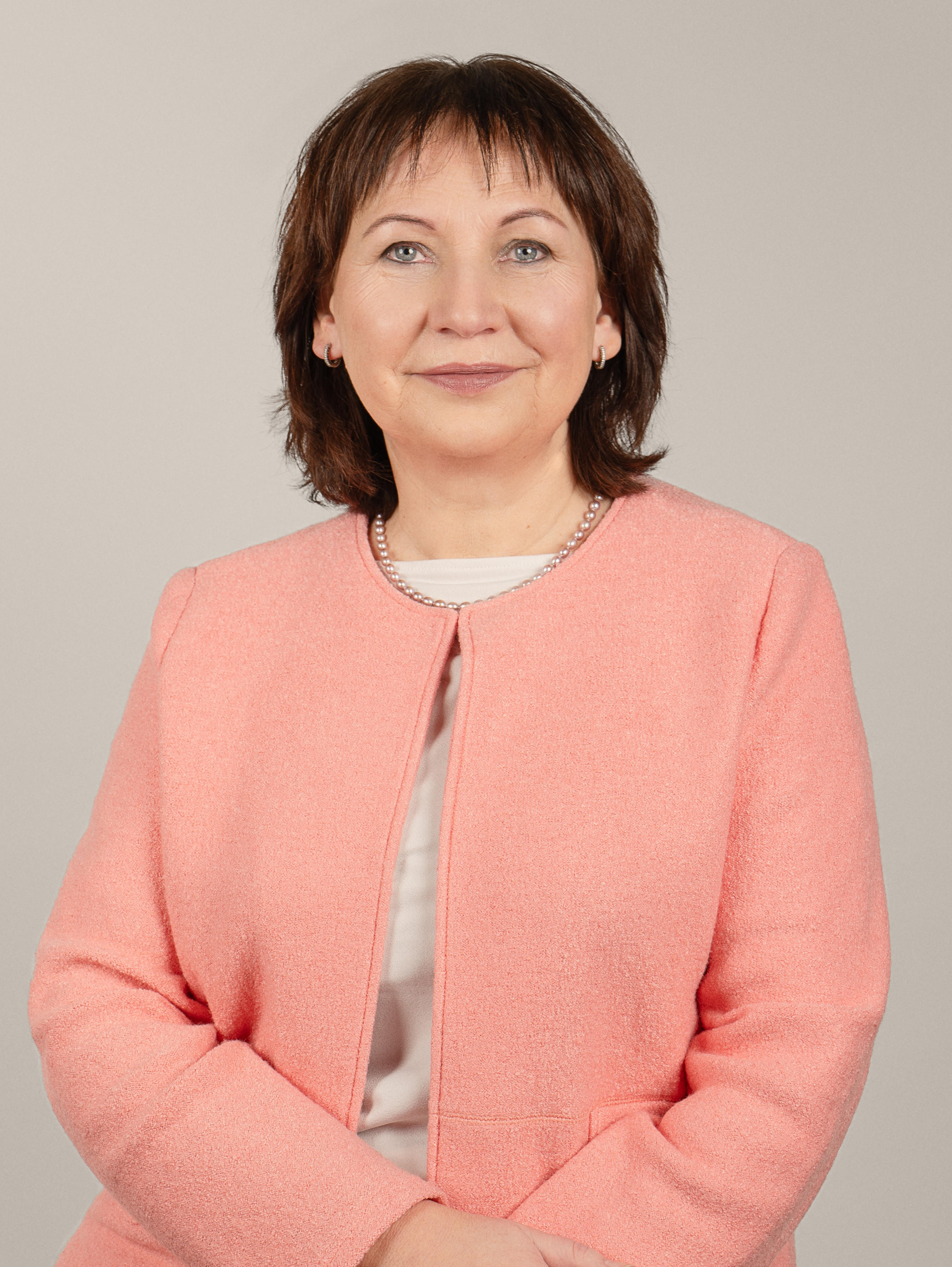
- Zailskienė in 2024

Minister of Social Security and Labour
- In office 25 September 2025 – 14 July 2026
- Prime Minister: Inga Ruginienė
- Preceded by: Inga Ruginienė
- Succeeded by: Inga Ruginienė

Member of the Seimas
- Incumbent
- Assumed office 14 November 2024
- Preceded by: Andrius Palionis
- Constituency: Dainava

Personal details
- Born: 6 December 1965 (age 60)
- Party: Social Democratic Party (since 2012)

Jūratė Zailskienė (born 6 December 1965, Utena) is a Lithuanian politician serving as a member of the Seimas since 2024. From 2023 to 2024, she served as deputy mayor of Prienai.
