= Orinta Leiputė =

Lithuanian politician (born 1973)

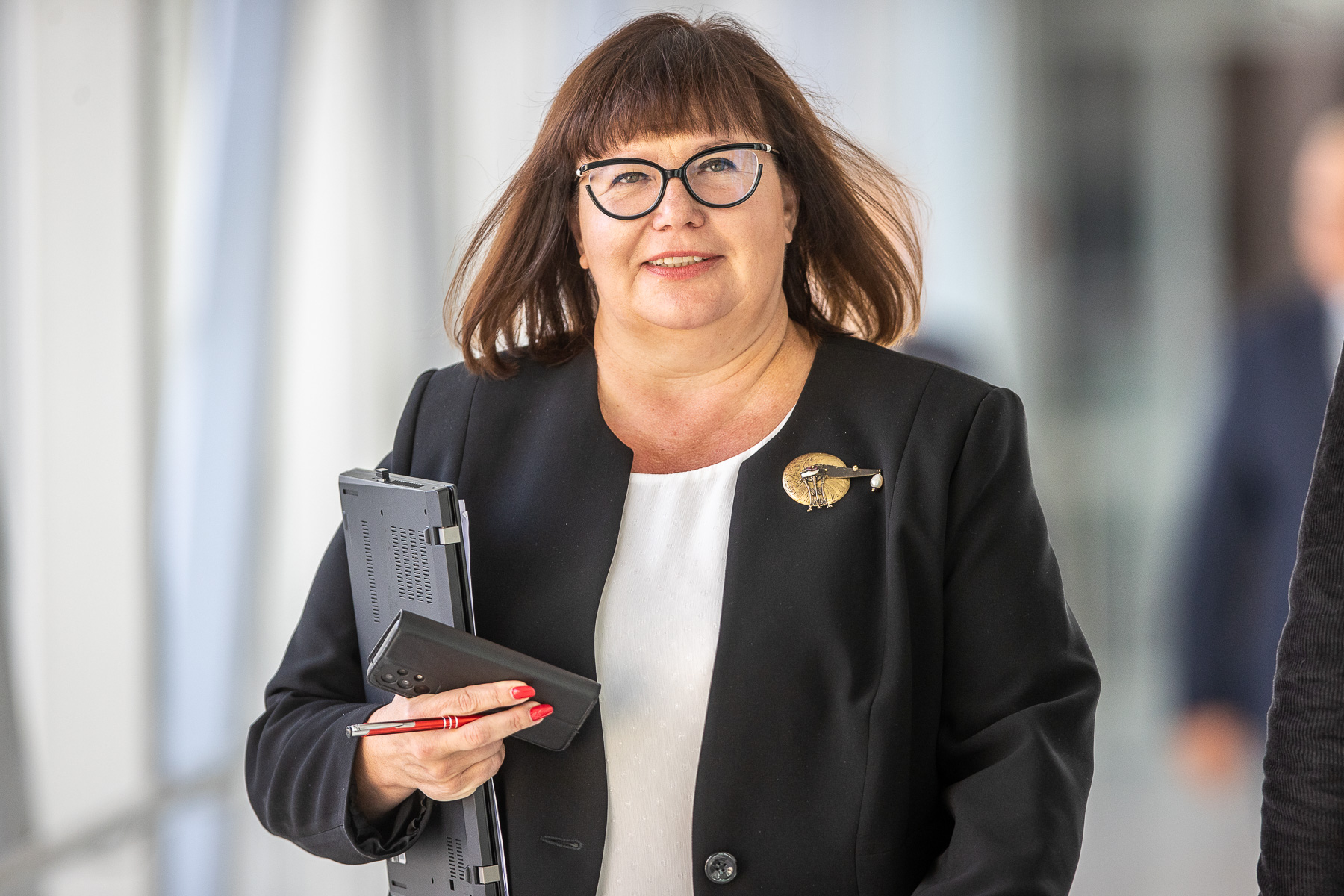
- Leiputė in 2023

Member of the Seimas
- Incumbent
- Assumed office 13 November 2020
- In office 16 November 2012 – 14 November 2016

Deputy Speaker of the Seimas
- In office 14 November 2024 – 26 August 2025
- Succeeded by: TBA

Personal details
- Born: 19 January 1973 (age 53)
- Party: Social Democratic Party

Orinta Leiputė (born 19 January 1973) is a Lithuanian politician of the Social Democratic Party. She has been member of the Seimas since 2020, having previously served from 2012 to 2016. From 2007 to 2012, she was a member of the city council of Kaunas.
