= Gintautas Paluckas =

Prime Minister of Lithuania from 2024 to 2025

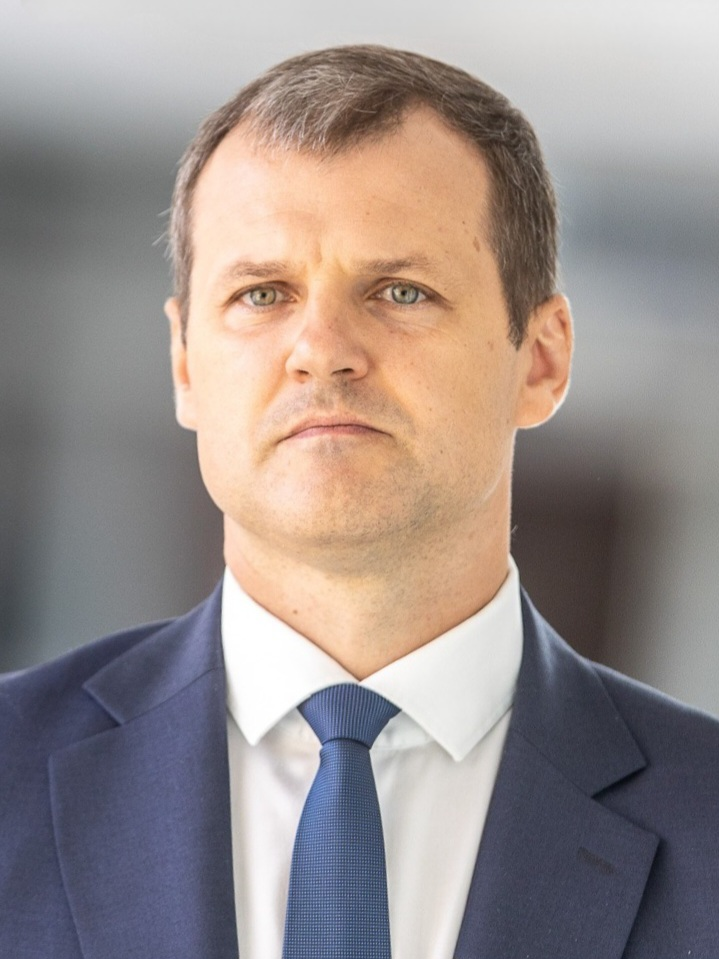
- Paluckas in 2023

18th Prime Minister of Lithuania
- In office 12 December 2024 – 4 August 2025
- President: Gitanas Nausėda
- Preceded by: Ingrida Šimonytė
- Succeeded by: Inga Ruginienė

Chairman of the Social Democratic Party
- In office 17 May 2025 – 31 July 2025
- Preceded by: Vilija Blinkevičiūtė
- Succeeded by: Mindaugas Sinkevičius
- In office 6 May 2017 – 22 January 2021
- Preceded by: Algirdas Butkevičius
- Succeeded by: Vilija Blinkevičiūtė

Member of the Seimas
- Incumbent
- Assumed office 13 November 2020
- Constituency: Multi-member

Deputy Mayor of Vilnius
- In office 22 April 2015 – 24 April 2019
- Mayor: Remigijus Šimašius
- Preceded by: Jonas Pinskus
- Succeeded by: Vytautas Mitalas

Personal details
- Born: 19 August 1979 (age 47) Panevėžys, then part of Lithuanian SSR, Soviet Union
- Party: Social Democratic (2003–2026) Independant (2026-present)
- Spouse: Ilma Paluckė
- Children: 2
- Education: Juozas Balčikonis Gymnasium
- Alma mater: Vilnius University

Gintautas Paluckas (Lithuanian: [ˈɡʲɪntˠɐʊtˠɐs pˠɐˈlˠʊtskɐs]; born 19 August 1979) is a Lithuanian politician who was the 18th prime minister of Lithuania from December 2024 until his resignation on 4 August 2025. He was previously Deputy Mayor of Vilnius from 2015 to 2019, led the Lithuanian Social Democratic Party (LSDP) between 2017 and 2021, and has been a member of the Seimas since the 2020 election. In 2025, Paluckas returned as LSDP leader after Vilija Blinkevičiūtė decided not to run for another term.

In the 2024 Lithuanian parliamentary election, Paluckas ran in the single-member constituency of Utena but finished third. Despite this, the LSDP won the overall election, and Paluckas secured a seat in the Seimas via the party's proportional representation list. Subsequently, he was nominated and confirmed as Prime Minister of Lithuania. The inclusion of the Dawn of Nemunas in his cabinet sparked protests.

On 31 July 2025, Paluckas announced his intention to resign as both prime minister and head of the LSDP after allegations of misconduct relating to business interests and the launch of formal investigations by anti-corruption and law enforcement agencies.

== Education ==
Gintautas Paluckas was born on 19 August 1979 in Panevėžys. His father worked as an engineer and his mother as an economist. In 1997 Paluckas graduated from Panevėžys J. Balčikonis Gymnasium. From 2000 to 2001 he studied English at a language school in London. In 2003, he graduated from the Vilnius University Faculty of Mathematics and Informatics, and from International Business School in 2004. Starting that year, he studied at VU Faculty of Law.

== Political career ==
For a brief period in his youth, Paluckas belonged to the Young Conservative League, the youth wing of the Homeland Union. Since 2003, he has been a member of the Lithuanian Social Democratic Party (LSDP).

From 2003 to 2005 he served as the Chief Specialist at the Lithuanian social insurance institution (Sodra). Starting in 2005 he served as the Assistant to European Parliament member Justas Paleckis. From 2007 to 2009 he was Director of Administration of the Vilnius city municipality.

From 2013 Paluckas was Executive Secretary of the Lithuanian Social Democratic Party, Member of the LSDP Council and Board.

From 2015 to 2019 Paluckas served as Deputy Mayor of Vilnius. During the peak of the 2015 European migrant crisis, he proposed that the city consider forming Arabic-language kindergarten groups to accommodate incoming refugees.

=== Leader of the Social Democratic Party ===
In 2017 Paluckas won the leadership election of the Social Democratic Party of Lithuania after defeating then-Minister of Economy Mindaugas Sinkevičius in a run-off. During the election, Paluckas emphasized renewal of the party and restoration of social democratic values, and criticized the party's decision to form a coalition with the Lithuanian Farmers and Greens Union. Under Paluckas's leadership, the party announced a renewal and introduced a new party program, in which it affirmed commitment to progressive taxation, encouragement of worker cooperatives, women's rights and LGBT rights, and support for NATO and the European Union, while at the same time opposing European austerity policies. Paluckas's opponent Mindaugas Sinkevičius filed a complaint on the leadership election due to alleged violations in the Molėtai party section, as well as alleged suspicions of electoral fraud in Pasvalys, Akmenė, Vilkaviškis and Raseiniai.

After the leadership election of the LSDP, the party decided to leave the ruling coalition via a survey of all its members. A majority of the LSDP's Seimas members left the party to form a new one, the Social Democratic Labour Party of Lithuania (LSDDP), and remained in the ruling coalition. According to former party leader and Lithuanian Prime Minister Algirdas Butkevičius, Paluckas began to divide his own and foreign members, and then split the party and monitored those who supported his party rival Mindaugas Sinkevičius in the election for party leader.

Paluckas was reelected as leader of the party in 2019.

In 2019, Paluckas ran in a parliamentary by-election in the Žirmūnai constituency of Vilnius. This parliamentary seat had been occupied by Aušra Maldeikienė, but was vacated following her election to the European Parliament. Paulė Kuzmickienė won with 52.03% of the vote, compared to Paluckas's 46.98%. Paluckas blamed his loss on low voter turnout.

=== 2020 Lithuanian parliamentary election ===
In 2020 Paluckas was elected to the Lithuanian parliament as the leader of the party. He finished second in the single-member constituency of Utena, following a recount due to receiving exactly the same number of votes as his opponent in the initial tally. Nonetheless, Paluckas secured a seat in the nationwide constituency using proportional representation. However, following the 2020 parliamentary election, in which the LSDP saw a reduction in its seats—from seventeen to thirteen—Paluckas was challenged over the party's performance. He also faced criticism over his decision to support the Lithuanian Farmers and Greens Union candidates in the second round of elections. Initially, he stated his willingness to take part in the leadership elections of 2021.

==== Resignation ====
On 22 January 2021, Paluckas resigned from his position as leader of the Social Democratic Party of Lithuania, responding to the party council's assessment that the 2020 Lithuanian parliamentary election results were unsatisfactory and that his leadership did not meet the expected standards.

=== 2024 Lithuanian parliamentary election ===
Paluckas, the Deputy Leader of the Lithuanian Social Democratic Party (LSDP), participated in the 2024 Lithuanian parliamentary election. He finished third in the single-member constituency of Utena, and secured a seat in the Seimas through the proportional representation system, drawing on his position in the LSDP's candidate list.

== Prime Minister of Lithuania ==
=== Nomination ===
On 30 October 2024, Vilija Blinkevičiūtė, the leader of the Social Democratic Party, announced at a press conference that she would not be the party's candidate for Prime Minister. Blinkevičiūtė disclosed that the party's presidium had decided to propose Paluckas as the nominee for the office of Prime Minister of Lithuania.

Throughout the campaign, Blinkevičiūtė had indicated her interest in assuming the Prime Minister role if her party succeeded. However, at the press conference, she cited personal considerations, including age and health, as factors influencing her decision to step back from the role. She confirmed her intention to complete her term as a Member of the European Parliament, which extends to 2029.

The Social Democratic Party presidium unanimously decided to nominate Paluckas. According to Blinkevičiūtė, Paluckas was selected because of his extensive experience in both local government and national politics. Additionally, it was noted that Paluckas had received significant public support, with 60,000 Lithuanian residents voting for him. According to official election data, Paluckas received 58,827 first-place votes, placing him second on the party list, following Blinkevičiūtė, who led with 91,526 votes, and ahead of Juozas Olekas, who ranked third with 48,470 votes.

During the same press event, Paluckas announced his intention to proceed with consultations regarding the formation of a centre-left coalition. He confirmed plans to continue discussions with political groups previously dismissed by Blinkevičiūtė, including the nationalist Dawn of Nemunas Party.

President Gitanas Nausėda confirmed that he was informed in advance about Blinkevičiūtė's decision not to submit her candidacy. Nausėda also confirmed that he was aware of the circumstances that could prevent Blinkevičiūtė from holding the position of Prime Minister. Nausėda refused to name these circumstances, stating that it would be unethical.

Paluckas's governing coalition was announced on 8 November 2024, including the Social Democrats, the centre-left Union of Democrats "For Lithuania", and the far-right Dawn of Nemunas party. The Social Democrats had previously pledged not to join a coalition, and the membership of Dawn of Nemunas in the coalition sparked protests outside the Seimas due to antisemitic statements by Remigijus Žemaitaitis, the party's leader. Liberal and conservative parties left the building when Žemaitaitis was sworn in as a member of parliament, and Nausėda declared that he would use his presidential powers to block the appointments of any Dawn of Nemunas members as ministers. The appointment was also criticised by officials of the United States, German and Polish governments.

==== Opposition viewpoints ====
On 31 October, Prime Minister Ingrida Šimonytė stated that Paluckas lacked sufficient experience within the executive branch. Šimonytė further commented that Paluckas has limited experience, predominantly gained while working in the Vilnius municipal administration. She also highlighted that Paluckas has a criminal conviction related to abuse of public office. On 30 October, Speaker of the Seimas Viktorija Čmilytė-Nielsen expressed that Blinkevičiūtė's nomination decision was unacceptable, as it undermines the trust in commitments made during the electoral campaign.

==== Coalition viewpoints ====
Linas Kukuraitis, representing the Union of Democrats "For Lithuania", commended Paluckas on his professionalism and commitment to political dialogue, as well as his ties with nongovernmental organizations and trade unions in Lithuania. Paluckas was also praised by Remigijus Motuzas, speaking for the Social Democratic Party of Lithuania, stating that "with his persistent work in the Seimas during the last parliamentary term, he has clearly demonstrated that, even in opposition, it is possible to do a lot of things and to implement one's own priorities".

On 21 November, Paluckas was nominated as the Prime Minister by the Seimas, with 88 votes in favor – all members of parliament of the coalition, as well as Artūras Zuokas and Vitalijus Šeršniovas.

=== July 2025 corruption allegations ===
In July 2025, Paluckas' alleged involvement in corruption increasingly came under public scrutiny. The television channel Laisvės TV and the investigative journalism centre Siena reported that he had paid Vilnius City Municipality the €16,500 sum ordered in his 2010 conviction only on 8 July 2025, that is, over a decade after the court instructed him to do so. The news portal Redakcija also revealed that Paluckas and an associate had purchased property in a state-owned forest between 2009 and 2014, under, according to the national broadcaster LRT, "questionable circumstances". Also in July, the Financial Crime Investigation Service (FNTT) launched an investigation into a €200,000 loan granted to a company partially owned by Paluckas (after he became the prime minister), while the Special Investigation Service began investigating Paluckas's ties to real estate and another company.

As allegations of involvement in financial fraud continued, on 23 July the three opposition parties (the Homeland Union, the Liberals' Movement and the Lithuanian Farmers and Greens Union) announced that they would call an emergency session in the parliament to begin impeachment proceedings against Paluckas. Paluckas responded to the criticism by calling it a coordinated attack by his political opponents. He announced the intent to launch a vote of no confidence in his government, urged by President Nausėda, who demanded that Paluckas either publicly respond to concerns regarding his business interests or resign.

On 31 July 2025, FNTT conducted multiple searches in the premises of the companies linked to Paluckas; the search was also conducted in the flat of Paluckas' brother, while the director of one company was arrested.

==== Companies and business ties ====
===== Sagerta =====
In 2013 Paluckas acquired the startup company Sagerta. He became its sole shareholder and director. Sagerta aimed to develop the lake bed topography project MyLakeMap.

Sagerta was financed by loans received from the company Uni Trading: in 2013, 100 thousand litas were lent, in 2014 the amount of loans reached 233 thousand litas, and in 2017 the amount of loans reached more than 180 thousand euros. On April 9, 2015, the shareholder structure of Sagerta changed. Paluckas' shares decreased to 25 percent. The remaining shares were transferred to the Vilnius-registered company Uni Trading (45 percent) and two individuals (15 percent each). In the first half of 2018, Paluckas withdrew from the shareholders of Sagerta.

In 2023 Sagerta went bankrupt with debts of more than 270 thousand euros. The majority of them remained unpaid.

Uni Trading's investment interests in Sagerta were represented by its representative Darijus Vilčinskas. A journalistic investigation by Laisvės TV and Siena revealed that the management structure of Uni Trading was complex. In the early period of Sagerta's loans, the company was managed through another Lithuanian company, Amber Realty Investments, which was owned by the Cypriot company Bitus Holdings Limited.

On 9 July 2025, Paluckas stated in writing that he and D. Vilčinskas "were not and are not connected by any joint business enterprises." Paluckas explained that their families are friends, "but are not connected by any financial obligations or business relationships." On the same day, D. Vilčinskas confirmed that he had invested his funds in Sagerta through the Uni Trading company.

In July 2025 the Special Investigation Service of Lithuanian opened an official investigation into Paluckas' business ties and participation in the activities associated with Sagerta.

===== Dankora =====
On 23 July 2025 Lithuanian media reported on Paluckas' business links with his brother's wife's company, Dankora. Dankora was granted 172,000 euros of European Union support funds in 2024. At that time, the company was owned by the sole shareholder Kostas Mikalajūnas. At the time of receiving European Union support funds, the company had no employees and revenues. On 21 November 2024, K. Mikalajūnas sold all of Dankora's shares to Virginija Paluckienė, the wife of Paluckas' brother Danas Paluckas. In accordance with the requirements of EU support, in February 2025, Dankora announced a public procurement for the purchase of inverters, batteries and their systems. The only participant in the public procurement was the company Garnis, which won the tender with a bid of 145,200 euros. 49 percent of Garnis' shares belong to Paluckas.

The media questioned Dankora's specifications of the deal which could have led to Garnis winning bid. On 25 July 2025, Dankora announced that it was terminating its contract with the National Paying Agency for the EU support funds.

=== Resignation ===
In July 2025, the public scrutiny and protests over Paluckas' questionable business deals and links were mounting. By the end of the month, President Gitanas Nausėda pressured Paluckas to consider his options, while the Speaker of the Seimas Saulius Skvernelis threatened to pull out of the coalition government if Paluckas will not resign. On 31 July 2025, Paluckas announced his resignation. On 4 August, Paluckas formally left office. Rimantas Šadžius, who had served as Finance Minister in the Paluckas Cabinet, became the Acting Prime Minister.

Following his resignation, the Social Democratic Party selected Inga Ruginienė as its candidate for prime minister.

== Conviction ==
On 7 December 2010, the First District Court of the city of Vilnius found Paluckas guilty of abuse of office and sentenced him to two years of imprisonment with a one-year suspension, ordering him not to leave his place of residence for more than seven days without the consent of the institution supervising the suspension of the sentence. The court found that Paluckas had abused office during the public tender for rodent extermination services in Vilnius. Paluckas was ordered to pay over fifty-seven thousand litas (equivalent to €16,500) damage to Vilnius city municipality.

In 2012 the verdict by the First District Court of the city of Vilnius was upheld by the final and unappealable decision of the Supreme Court of Lithuania First District Court of the city of Vilnius: Paluckas was found guilty of abuse of office in a non-transparent public procurement tender.

== Controversies ==
In February 2018, the Central Electoral Commission investigated claims that Gintautas Paluckas's brother Danas, then serving on the Palanga City Council, had been convicted of a crime in Italy in 2006 but had failed to declare this fact when running for office. As a result, Danas Paluckas was stripped of his mandate, but denied any wrongdoing. Later in 2018 it was revealed by the State Security Department of Lithuania that the MG Baltic business group had fabricated the Italy story as disinformation in order to smear Gintautas Paluckas by association, allegedly because the company was dissatisfied with his leadership of the LSDP.

In October 2024, an investigation conducted by Linas Jegelevičius for the regional newspaper Palangos tiltas revealed that Palanga City Council member Svetlana Tučkė held the position of Seimas assistant for two different members of the Lithuanian Parliament: Gintautas Paluckas and Tomas Bičiūnas. From November 2020 to January 2021, Tučkė, a fellow member of the Social Democratic Party, was employed as an assistant to Paluckas with a workload of 125%. From January 2021 Tučkė worked full-time for Paluckas and 25%-time for Bičiūnas; at the same time, she served as a member of the Palanga City Council.

In November 2024, the Baltic News Service (BNS) published investigations into the companies Garnis and Emus, both jointly owned by Paluckas and Mindaugas Milašauskas. BNS revealed that the battery storage company Garnis, in which Paluckas holds a 49% stake, purchases lithium iron phosphate batteries from China. Garnis CEO Andrius Aglinskas stated that the company's products are still in a prototype phase, but did not rule out that the final product could incorporate batteries from China due to the lack of European-made equivalents. The home appliance company Emus, in which Paluckas holds a 51% stake, aims to implement a "zero China policy", but imports some components from China, allegedly accounting for under 1% of its raw material purchases. The reports emerged shortly after Paluckas had announced his intention to normalize China-Lithuania relations, which had been severed by China due to the previous Lithuanian government's support for opening a Taiwanese Representative Office in Vilnius.

== Personal life ==
Gintautas Paluckas is married to Ilma Paluckė. They have two children. As of 2023, Paluckas was the second-wealthiest member of the Seimas, with €2.13 million in assets. His family owns a walnut orchard in Turkey as well as a plot of land in Brazil.

Besides his native Lithuanian, Paluckas speaks fluent English, proficient Russian, and basic Spanish and Portuguese. His hobbies include fishing, playing basketball, and raising chickens and ducks. Paluckas is a member of the Lithuanian Riflemen's Union.

He is an author of several articles and political reviews in the national press.

Party political offices
Preceded by Algirdas Butkevičius	Chairman of the Social Democratic Party; 2017–2021	Succeeded by Vilija Blinkevičiūtė
Preceded by Vilija Blinkevičiūtė	Chairman of the Social Democratic Party; 2025	Succeeded by Mindaugas Sinkevičius
Political offices
Preceded by Ingrida Šimonytė	Prime Minister of Lithuania; 2024–2025	Succeeded by Rimantas Šadžius; Acting
