= Gediminas Kirkilas =

Lithuanian politician (1951–2024)

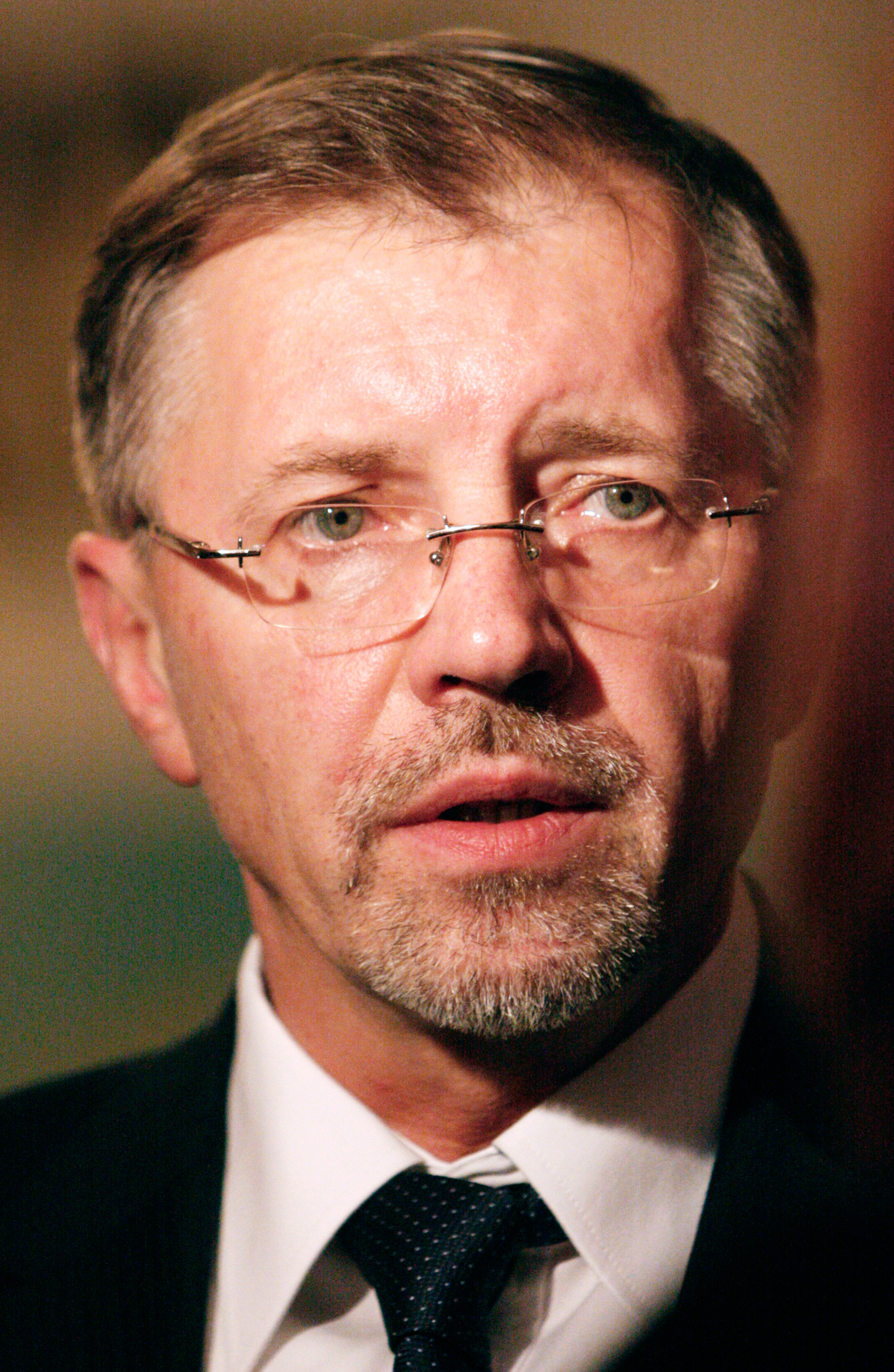
- Kirkilas in 2007

Chairman of the Social Democratic Labour Party
- In office 25 March 2018 – 19 June 2021
- Preceded by: Office established
- Succeeded by: Jonas Pinskus

Deputy Speaker of the Seimas
- In office 16 November 2012 – 12 November 2020

Member of the Seimas
- In office 25 November 1992 – 12 November 2020
- Constituency: Multi-member

13th Prime Minister of Lithuania
- In office 4 July 2006 – 9 December 2008
- President: Valdas Adamkus
- Preceded by: Zigmantas Balčytis (acting)
- Succeeded by: Andrius Kubilius

Minister of National Defence
- In office 14 December 2004 – 18 July 2006
- President: Valdas Adamkus
- Prime Minister: Algirdas Brazauskas
- Preceded by: Linas Linkevičius
- Succeeded by: Juozas Olekas

Personal details
- Born: 30 August 1951 Vilnius, then part of Lithuanian SSR, Soviet Union
- Died: 20 April 2024 (aged 72) Vilnius, Lithuania
- Party: LSDDP (2018–2024)
- Other political affiliations: LSDP (2001–2017); LDDP (1990–2001); LKP (1972–1990)
- Spouse: Liudmila Kirkilienė

Gediminas Kirkilas (30 August 1951 – 20 April 2024) was a Lithuanian politician who was Prime Minister of Lithuania from 2006 to 2008.

== Life and career ==
Kirkilas was born in Vilnius in 1951. After returning from mandatory military service, from 1972 to 1978 he worked on several cultural monuments (e.g. churches or the Verkiai Palace) restoring their interior and especially rolled gold and molding. In 1978–1982 he studied political science. After graduation, he joined the Communist Party of Lithuania and took various posts there. When Algirdas Brazauskas was appointed the secretary of the party, Kirkilas became his press secretary.

After independence was declared on 11 March 1990, Kirkilas was involved in the state matters and was elected to the Seimas seven times, representing the Democratic Labour Party of Lithuania (in 1992, 1996 and 2000) and the Social Democratic Party of Lithuania (in 2004, 2008, 2012 and 2016). He was appointed the Minister of National Defence of Lithuania on 7 December 2004.

In 2004, he received an MBA from the International Business School in Vilnius.

Kirkilas was confirmed by the Seimas on 4 July 2006 after Zigmantas Balčytis, the provisional Prime Minister, failed to gather the required support from the parliament. He stepped down on 27 November 2008 after the 2008 parliamentary elections, and gave way to Andrius Kubilius to start his second term as the prime minister.

In January 2007 he was praised in The Economist as an unsung hero whose "minority administration has surpassed all expectations".

Kirkilas died in the morning on 20 April 2024, at the age of 72.

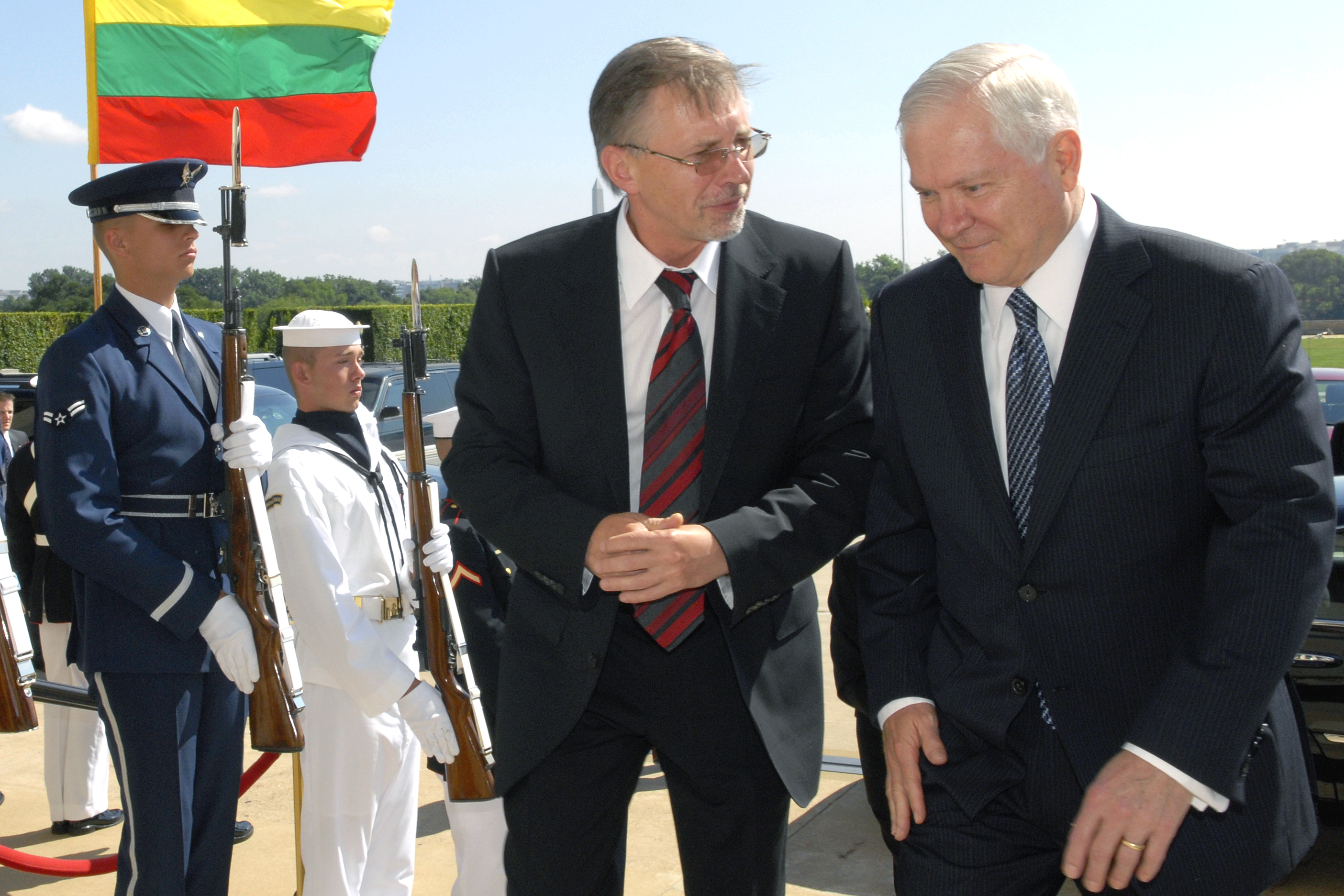
Gediminas Kirkilas and Robert M. Gates, 1 July 2008

== Premiership of Gediminas Kirkilas ==
During his time in office GDP rose by 21 percent, financing of socially sensitive areas increased, strategic decisions were made in the field of energy, personal income tax decreased and relations with Poland were strengthened. Kirkilas' Cabinet was criticized for its denial of coming economic crisis and for not obeying fiscal rules.

== Controversies ==
In July 2007, Kirkilas signed the protocol assigning the members of newly formed governmental work group to assist the energy company "Lietuvos energija" in negotiating and consulting with potential foreign partners for a new Ignalina nuclear power plant project. A public turmoil followed after the name of Darius Jurgelevičius occurred in the list of the work group. After the so-called State Security Department scandal in 2006, when a senior officer Vytautas Pociūnas died under controversial circumstances in a hotel in Belarus, the witnesses described Darius Jurgelevičius as a middleman transmitting then Lithuanian Foreign Ministry's clerk Albinas Januška's influence to State Security Department. Albinas Januška worked as G. Kirkilas's advisor.

In July 2007, before handing his powers to his successors, Vidmantas Jankauskas the chairman of the State Price and Energy Control Commission spoke about the ties between gas companies and the Prime Minister Kirkilas, saying: "a gas company "Lietuvos dujos" is privately lobbying G. Kirkilas and the second Lithuanian monopolist gas company Dujotekana – Ministry of Economics. CEO of Lietuvos dujos, Viktoras Valentukevičius, meets Kirkilas privately to play tennis".

In October 2014, Fair Observer featured an interview with Kirkilas where he spoke on his pro-nuclear energy stance.

Political offices
Preceded by Zigmantas Balčytis	Prime Minister of Lithuania; 2006–2008	Succeeded by Andrius Kubilius
