= Social Democratic Party of Lithuania =

Centre-left political party in Lithuania

Social Democratic Party of Lithuania Lietuvos socialdemokratų partija
- Abbreviation: LSDP
- Chairperson: Mindaugas Sinkevičius
- First Deputy Chair: Robert Duchnevič
- Deputy Chairs: See list: Rasa Budbergytė; Nerijus Cesiulis; Robertas Kaunas; Indrė Kižienė; Orinta Leiputė; Juozas Olekas; Raminta Popovienė; Algirdas Raslanas; Mindaugas Rinkevičius; Inga Ruginienė; Dovilė Šakalienė; Jūratė Zailskienė
- Executive Secretary: Justas Pankauskas
- Founded: 1 May 1896; 130 years ago
- Headquarters: B. Radvilaitės g. 1, Vilnius
- Youth wing: Lietuvos socialdemokratinio jaunimo sąjunga (LSDJS)
- Membership (2022): ▲15,205
- Ideology: Social democracy
- Political position: Centre-left
- European affiliation: Party of European Socialists
- European Parliament group: Progressive Alliance of Socialists and Democrats
- International affiliation: Progressive Alliance; Socialist International
- Colours: Red
- Seimas: 51 / 141
- European Parliament: 2 / 11
- Municipal councils: 358 / 1,498
- Mayors: 17 / 60

Website
- lsdp.lt

The Social Democratic Party of Lithuania (Lithuanian: Lietuvos socialdemokratų partija, LSDP) is a centre-left and social democratic political party in Lithuania. Founded as an underground Marxist organisation in 1896, it is the oldest extant party in Lithuania. During the Soviet occupation, the party ceased to exist. The party reemerged after the fall of the Soviet Union and the end of communist rule in 1989.

The party led a government in the unicameral Seimas, Lithuania's parliament from 2001 to 2008 and from 2012 to 2016. It has been the ruling party of Lithuania since 2024. The party is a member of the Party of European Socialists (PES), Progressive Alliance, and Socialist International.

== History ==
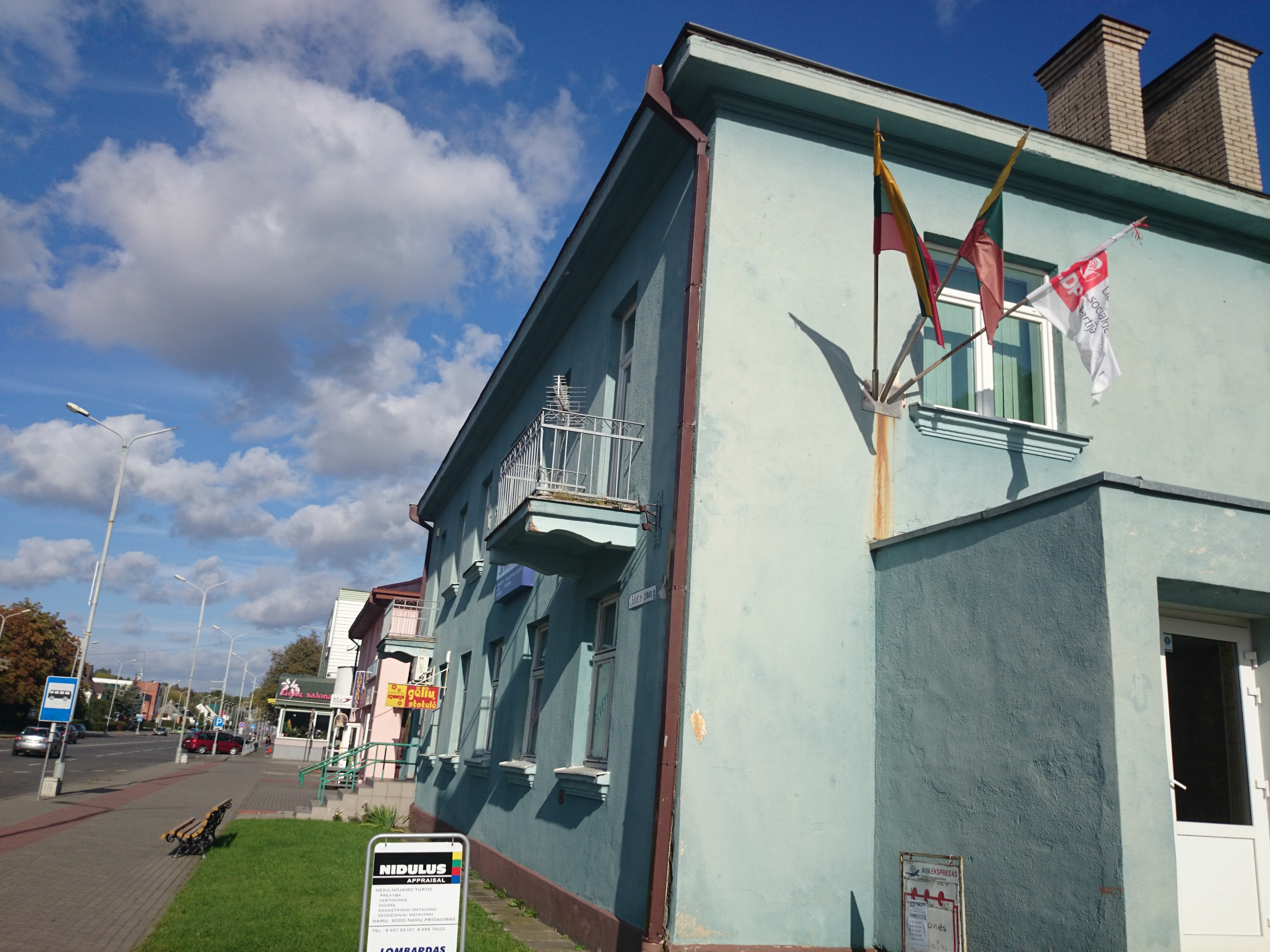
LSDP offices in Jonava

=== Establishment ===
Initial discussions about forming a Marxist political party in Lithuania began early in 1895, with a number of informal gatherings bringing together social democrats of various stripes resulting in a preparatory conference in the summer of that year. Differences in objectives became clear between ethnic Jews and ethnic Lithuanians and Poles, with the former seeing themselves essentially as Russian Marxists while the latter two groups harboured both revolutionary and national aspirations. Moreover, the ethnic Poles and Lithuanians saw themselves divided over the question of alliance with non-Marxist liberals. As a result, not one but three Marxist political organisations would emerge in Lithuania between 1895 and 1897.

The Social Democratic Party of Lithuania (LSDP) was founded on 1 May (19 April O.S.) 1896 at a secret congress held in an apartment in Vilnius. Among the 13 delegates were Andrius Domaševičius and Alfonsas Moravskis—a pair of intellectuals regarded as the central organisers of the new political entity—and the future President of Lithuania, Kazys Grinius, as well as a number of worker activists. Also in attendance as a representative of the radical youth movement was an 18-year-old ethnic Pole named Felix Dzerzhinsky, later the head of the Soviet secret police. As Lithuania was then part of the Russian Empire, the LSDP was inevitably an illegal organisation, meeting in secret and seeking to bring about the revolutionary overthrow of the Tsarist regime.

The LSDP was a dual language organisation, publishing its illegal newspapers both in Lithuanian and Polish. Newspapers were published abroad, printed in East Prussia (or sometimes Switzerland or France) and smuggled across the border. Technical assistance was occasionally provided by the Social Democracy of the Kingdom of Poland and Lithuania party, headed by Julian Marchlewski.

The party's first program, approved in 1896, was directly influenced by the Erfurt Program, as well as the resolutions of the Second International and the program of the Social Democracy of the Kingdom of Poland and the Polish Socialist Party. It called for an independent democratic republic of Lithuania in a federation with Poland, Latvia, Belarus and Ukraine. It was the first political organization in Lithuania to call for Lithuania's independence from the Russian Empire.

This smuggling of Lithuanian newspapers had historical antecedents. Following the Polish and Lithuanian Uprising of 1863, the Tsarist regime had banned publication of all newspapers which used the Latin alphabet, a measure which amounted to a de facto ban of the entire Lithuanian press. This proscription extended for the rest of the 19th Century; in 1898 of 18 newspapers appearing in Lithuanian, 11 were published by Lithuanians in emigration in America and the other 7 were published in East Prussia.

The LSDP was very nearly obliterated at birth by the Okhrana, which over the course of 1897 to 1899 managed to arrest a number of the party's leading activists. Approximately 280 socialist and trade union organisers were apprehended during this period, with subsequent trials leading to the Siberian exile of more than 40 people, including Domaševičius and Dzerzhinsky. Other top leaders, including Moravskis, were forced to flee the country to avoid being swept up in the Okhrana's dragnet. With the party leadership jailed or chased from the country, the LSDP very nearly ceased to exist as the 19th century drew to a close.

=== Resurgence ===
From 1900 to 1902, the Social Democratic Party of Lithuania began to tentatively rise from the ashes behind a new crop of young revolutionaries. Chief among these were a pair of Lithuanian students in Vilnius, Vladas Sirutavičius and Steponas Kairys.

It was the first Lithuanian political party and one of the major parties who initiated the assembly called Great Seimas of Vilnius in 1905. In the Great Seimas, it represented the most radical left wing of the assembly and had poor relations with the assembly's other representatives, which belonged to the liberal Lithuanian Democratic Party and the Lithuanian Christian democratic current. These two parties opposed LSDP's program of armed struggle against the Russian government and it was thus not adopted by the assembly.

=== Split and reformation ===
During the German occupation of Lithuania from 1915 to 1918, the party abandoned previous projects for a multinational federation or autonomy within Russia, began to call for an independent democratic Lithuania and joined the Council of Lithuania. However, it experienced an internal crisis in late 1918 and was divided between supporting the Constituent Assembly of Lithuania or soviet rule. In December 1918, the majority of LSDP members in Vilnius, led by Andrius Domaševičius, left the party and established the short-lived LSDP-LKP which recognized the Bolshevik-supported revolutionary government led by Vincas Mickevičius-Kapsukas. A minority group of social democrats led by Steponas Kairys and Juozas Paknys remained in Lithuania, supported the government of Mykolas Sleževičius during the Lithuanian Wars of Independence and reestablished the party ahead of the 1920 Lithuanian parliamentary election.

The party was one of the major political powers during the Lithuanian independence period between 1918 and 1940. Following the election of 1926, the party formed a left-wing coalition government with Lithuanian Peasant Popular Union. This government was dismissed after the 1926 Lithuanian coup d'état. The authoritarian regime of Antanas Smetona banned all political parties in 1936.

=== Period of Soviet occupation ===
During the Soviet occupation era, no democratically constituted political parties existed within Lithuania. Therefore, between 1945 and the 1989 restoration of independence, the party was assembled and worked covertly in exile.

=== 1989–2001 ===
In 1989, the Social Democratic Party of Lithuania was restored. Kazimieras Antanavičius was elected to be party's leader. The party had 9 seats in the Supreme Council – Reconstituent Seimas and was not successful in substantially increasing the number in the following elections, with 8 seats won in 1992 and 12 in 1996.

In 1999, the party's congress elected a new leader, Vytenis Andriukaitis and merger negotiations with the Democratic Labour Party of Lithuania (LDDP)–the bulk of the former Communist Party of Lithuania (which had broken away from Moscow in 1989) began. Members of the party opposing the merger left to establish "Social democracy 2000" (later renamed "Social Democratic Union of Lithuania"). The SDPL-LDDP coalition won 51 of the 141 seats in the elections in 2000 (with 19 going to the Social Democrats). However, despite success in the elections, the coalition parties had to settle for a place in the opposition until 2001, when the collapse of the ruling coalition between Liberals and New Union allowed ex-President Algirdas Brazauskas to form a government with New Union.

=== Since 2001 ===
In 2001, the Social Democratic Party of Lithuania and the Democratic Labour Party of Lithuania merged. The merged party kept the Social Democratic name, but was dominated by former Democratic Labour Party members (ex-Communists). After the merger, Algirdas Brazauskas was elected leader of the Social Democratic Party.

By the beginning of 2004, negotiations between the Social Democratic Party of Lithuania and various other parties to form electoral coalition. They managed to form electoral coalition called "Working for Lithuania" with their coalition partners, New Union. At the 2004 legislative elections, the Social Democratic Party of Lithuania won 20 of the 141 seats in the Seimas (other 11 seats were won by the New Union), but managed to stay at the helm of successive coalition governments, including the minority government between 2006 and 2008. During the minority government, party's parliamentary group became the largest one in parliament, mainly due to defections from the Labour Party and the New Union (Social Liberals).

Brazauskas resigned as the chairman of the party on 19 May 2007 and was replaced by Gediminas Kirkilas.

At the 2008 elections, the party won 11.73% of the national vote and 25 seats in the Seimas, five more than in the previous elections. However, its coalition partners, the Labour Party, the New Union (Social Liberals) and the Lithuanian Peasants Popular Union, fared poorly and the party ended up in opposition to the Homeland Union-led government.

On 7 March 2009, the party's congress elected a new leader, Algirdas Butkevičius. He was the party's candidate at the 2009 Lithuanian presidential election, coming in second place with 11.83% of the vote.

At the 2012 parliamentary elections, the party took 38 seats and became the largest party in Parliament (although it lost in popular vote). Butkevičius became the prime minister, forming a coalition government with the Labour Party, Order and Justice and Electoral Action of Poles in Lithuania – Christian Families Alliance. At the 2016 parliamentary elections, the party took 21 seats and formed a coalition with Lithuanian Farmers and Greens Union.

In 2017, the Social Democratic Party withdraw from coalition. In 2018, some party members left and formed the Social Democratic Labour Party of Lithuania. After this split, the party lost a lot of support, but in 2019 it partly recovered.

At the 2020 parliamentary elections, the party achieved worse results than expected. Due to this, Gintautas Paluckas received criticism from party's board and resigned in 2021. After a leadership election, Vilija Blinkevičiūtė (between 2002 and 2006 she was New Union (Social Liberals) member) was elected as the new leader. After election of Blinkevičiūtė, the party's support nearly doubled thanks to her personal popularity.

In the 2024 parliamentary elections, the party achieved a "historic victory", finishing in first place with 19.32% of the popular vote and 52 out of 141 seats. While party chair Vilija Blinkevičiūtė had expressed her willingness to serve as prime minister during the campaign, she declined the role after the election, leading instead to the nomination of deputy chair Gintautas Paluckas. This unexpected change in leadership was criticized by the LSDP's potential coalition partners.

After the election, further controversy arose when the Social Democrats invited the newly created populist party Dawn of Nemunas to join the ruling coalition, along with the Union of Democrats "For Lithuania". The founder of Dawn of Nemunas, Remigijus Žemaitaitis, is known for making antisemitic statements, and his party's inclusion sparked backlash from Lithuanian civil society groups, as well as from lawmakers and ambassadors abroad, including US Senate Foreign Relations Committee chair Ben Cardin, German MPs Roderich Kiesewetter and Michael Roth, Polish senator Michał Kamiński, and the Israeli embassy. Roth, the chair of the Bundestag Foreign Affairs Committee, urged the LSDP to reconsider their choice and claimed that it would threaten LSDP's membership in the Party of European Socialists. However, no official PES condemnation of the coalition was issued, and the European party congratulated the Social Democrats with the formation of the Paluckas Cabinet on December 12.

In power, the Paluckas Cabinet raised Lithuania's defense funding to its highest level in the country's history, reformed the retirement fund system, re-established the option for low-income families to choose a public electricity supplier, increased child benefits and funding for education, abolished premiums for private healthcare services which are financed by the state healthcare fund, and established a road fund. On 27 June 2025, a taxation reform put forward by the Social Democrats was approved by the Seimas, which established a progressive taxation system for personal income with three tax brackets, raised corporate tax and established new taxes on sugar and non-life insurance.

On 31 July 2025, following a series of investigative reports on his allegedly corrupt business dealings, Gintautas Paluckas announced his resignation as prime minister and chair of the Social Democratic Party. Due to Paluckas's resignation, the LSDP first deputy chair Mindaugas Sinkevičius became the acting chair of the party. On 4 August, Rimantas Šadžius was appointed as the acting prime minister of Lithuania.

== Ideology and platform ==
LSDP is generally described as a centre-left party. Historically, the party was criticized for lacking commitment to social democracy. According to political scientist Ainė Ramonaitė, "before their split, the Social Democrats never managed to be a left-wing party. Although they said they were, their policies were right-wing, even the vocabulary was closer to the right". During the Eleventh Seimas from 2012 to 2016, when the party played a leading role in the Butkevičius Cabinet, it was criticized by left-wing intellectuals such as Andrius Bielskis and Arkadijus Vinokuras for lacking allegiance to left-wing ideas and for its neoliberal policies, such as reforms to the Labour Code in 2016 which strengthened the position of employers in workplace relations.

In 2017, after Gintautas Paluckas was elected as the party's chairman, LSDP declared a renewal of its ideology and values, reforming closer to a Western social democratic party. It introduced a new program, in which it affirmed commitment to progressive taxation, encouragement of worker cooperatives, women's rights and LGBT rights, and support for NATO and the European Union, while at the same time opposing European austerity policies. Several of the party's former leaders and members of the Seimas left the party in 2017 and 2018, including two former Prime Ministers, Gediminas Kirkilas and Algirdas Butkevičius. Most of them then established the Social Democratic Labour Party, later renamed to the Lithuanian Regions Party. However, this renewal was also criticized as incomplete and straddling the fence between progressiveness and the party's previous non-ideological populism.

After Paluckas' resignation, Vilija Blinkevičiūtė was elected as LSDP's new chairman. The party's program was retained, and conservative former party members such as Artūras Skardžius were not accepted back into the party. However, the party has since focused most on criticism of the Homeland Union and progressive economic proposals over social justice and social reforms. 5 of 13 of the party's members of the Seimas voted against a proposed same-sex partnership law in 2021, even though the party's program was in favor of same-sex partnerships. The Left Alliance was founded in 2022 in response to the Social Democrats' alleged betrayal of left-wing values.

The party supports lowering voting age to 16 in local elections.

== Popular support ==
In early 1990s, the party had between 3 and 5 per cent support nationally. It got most support from areas with light industry (e. g. Marijampolė, Vilkaviškis, Miklusėnai). By the end of the decade, LSDP increased their support in Radviliškis District Municipality (probably, at expense of Democratic Labour Party of Lithuania (LDDP)).

After merger of these two parties, LSDP gained support from most supporters of LDDP. In early 2010s, the party lost support due to deindustrialisation, rise of public election committees and Lithuanian Farmers and Greens Union (e. g. in Kaunas, by 2011, got over 12 per cent of votes; however, in 2019, the party received just over 3 per cent of the votes).

== Election results ==
=== Seimas ===
Election	Leader	Votes (Note: Proportional representation votes)	%	Seats	+/–	Government
1920	Unclear	87,051	12.76 (#3)	13 / 112	New	Opposition
1922	Steponas Kairys	84,643	10.42 (#5)	11 / 78	▼2	Opposition
1923	Steponas Kairys	101,778	11.29 (#5)	8 / 78	▼3	Opposition
1926	Steponas Kairys	173,250	17.03 (#2)	15 / 85	▲7	Coalition
1936	Banned					
Banished under the Lithuanian Soviet Socialist Republic
1992	Aloyzas Sakalas	112,410	6.05 (#4)	8 / 141	▲8	Opposition
1996	Aloyzas Sakalas	90,756	6.94 (#5)	12 / 141	▲4	Opposition
2000	Vytenis Andriukaitis	457,294 (Note: Participated in Social-Democratic Coalition of Algirdas Brazauskas (along with Democratic Labour Party of Lithuania, Union of the Russians of Lithuania and New Democracy Party))	31.08 (#1)	19 / 141	▲7	Opposition (2000–2001)
2000	Vytenis Andriukaitis	457,294	31.08 (#1)	45 / 141	▲21 (Note: Combined results with Democratic Labour Party of Lithuania after merger of parties)	Coalition (2001–2004)
2004	Algirdas Brazauskas	246,852 (Note: Participated in Coalition "Working for Lithuania" (along with New Union (Social Liberals)))	20.65 (#2)	20 / 141	▲1	Coalition
2008	Gediminas Kirkilas	144,890	11.72 (#4)	25 / 141	▲5	Opposition
2012	Algirdas Butkevičius	251,610	19.18 (#2)	38 / 141	▲13	Coalition
2016	Algirdas Butkevičius	183,597	15.04 (#3)	17 / 141	▼21	Coalition (2016–2017)
2016	Algirdas Butkevičius	183,597	15.04 (#3)	17 / 141	▼21	Opposition (2017–2020)
2020	Gintautas Paluckas	108,649	9.58 (#3)	13 / 141	▼4	Opposition
2024	Vilija Blinkevičiūtė	240,503	19.70 (#1)	52 / 141	▲39	Coalition

==== By-elections ====
Election	Candidate	Votes	%	Place	Result
2026 Nalšios Šiaurinė	Vladislav Kondratovič	TBD	TBD	TBD	TBD

=== European Parliament ===
Election	List leader	Votes	%	Seats	+/–	EP Group
2004	Justas Vincas Paleckis	173,888	14.43 (#2)	2 / 13	New	PES
2009	Vilija Blinkevičiūtė	102,347	18.61 (#2)	3 / 12	▲1	S&D
2014	Zigmantas Balčytis	197,477	17.26 (#2)	2 / 11	▼1	S&D
2019	Vilija Blinkevičiūtė	199,220	15.88 (#2)	2 / 11	0	S&D
2024	Vilija Blinkevičiūtė	121,880	17.98 (#2)	2 / 11	0	S&D

== Leaders ==
- Aloyzas Sakalas (14 January 1991 – 15 June 1999)
- Vytenis Andriukaitis (15 June 1999 – 15 May 2001)
- Algirdas Brazauskas (15 May 2001 – 29 June 2007)
- Gediminas Kirkilas (29 June 2007 – 12 May 2009)
- Algirdas Butkevičius (12 May 2009 – 8 May 2017)
- Gintautas Paluckas (8 May 2017 – 22 January 2021)
- Vilija Blinkevičiūtė (29 May 2021 – 17 May 2025)
- Gintautas Paluckas (17 May 2025 – 31 July 2025)
