= Algirdas Butkevičius =

Lithuanian politician (born 1958)

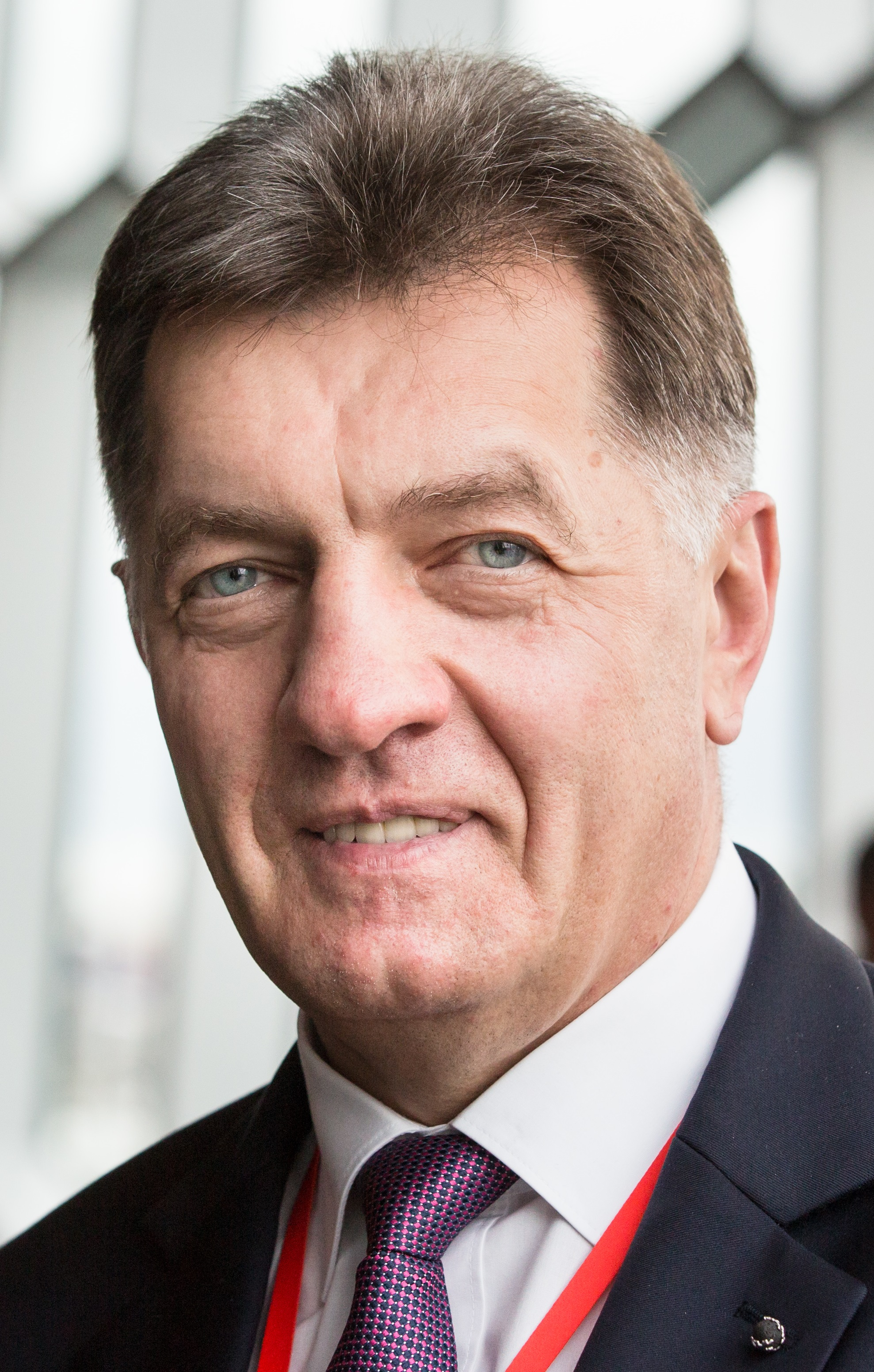
- Butkevičius in 2014

15th Prime Minister of Lithuania
- In office 26 November 2012 – 22 November 2016
- President: Dalia Grybauskaitė
- Preceded by: Andrius Kubilius
- Succeeded by: Saulius Skvernelis

Member of the Seimas
- Incumbent
- Assumed office 13 November 2020
- Preceded by: Kęstutis Smirnovas
- Constituency: Vilkaviškis
- In office 14 November 2016 – 12 November 2020
- Constituency: Multi-member
- In office 25 November 1996 – 13 November 2016
- Preceded by: Algimantas Antanas Greimas
- Succeeded by: Kęstutis Smirnovas
- Constituency: Vilkaviškis

Chairman of the Social Democratic Party
- In office 7 March 2009 – 22 April 2017
- Preceded by: Gediminas Kirkilas
- Succeeded by: Gintautas Paluckas

Minister of Finance of Lithuania
- In office 3 May 2004 – 14 May 2005
- Prime Minister: Algirdas Brazauskas
- Preceded by: Dalia Grybauskaitė
- Succeeded by: Zigmantas Balčytis

Minister of Transport and Communications of Lithuania
- In office 18 July 2006 – 9 December 2008
- Prime Minister: Gediminas Kirkilas
- Preceded by: Petras Čėsna
- Succeeded by: Eligijus Masiulis

Personal details
- Born: 19 November 1958 (age 67) Paežeriai, then part of Lithuanian SSR, Soviet Union
- Party: Union of Democrats "For Lithuania" (2022–present)
- Other political affiliations: Communist Party of the Soviet Union (1985–1988); Social Democratic Party (1992–2017); Independent (2017–2020; 2021–2022); Lithuanian Green Party (2020–2021)
- Spouse: Janina Butkevičienė
- Children: 2
- Education: Vilnius Gediminas Technical University; Kazimieras Simonavičius University; Kaunas University of Technology

Algirdas Butkevičius (born 19 November 1958) is a Lithuanian politician and was Prime Minister of Lithuania, serving between 2012 and 2016. He also served as the Minister of Finance from 2004 to 2005 and the Minister of Transport and Communications from 2006 to 2008. He led the Social Democratic Party of Lithuania from 2009 to 2017.

== Political career ==
Butkevičius was born at Paežeriai village in Radviliškis district municipality. Since 1992 he is member of the Social Democratic Party of Lithuania (LSDP). He was chairman of the Vilkaviškis District section of LSDP in 1995–1997, deputy chairman of the LSDP in 1999–2005 (re-elected in 2001), and chairman of the LSDP since 2009.

In 1996 and 2000, he was elected to the Seimas (parliament). From 2004 to 2005 he served as Minister of Finance and from 2006 to 2008 as Minister of Transport and Communications.

Butkevičius was the LSDP's candidate in the 2009 presidential election, placing second with 11.83% of the votes. As of 2010, he is the chairman of the LSDP.

During the 2012 parliamentary election, Butkevičius was among the few candidates who were elected in the first round of the popular vote.

On 22 November 2012 he was elected by the Seimas to be prime minister-designate. He was appointed prime minister by presidential decree on 7 December 2012 and his cabinet was sworn in on 13 December, following the approval of the governmental program by the parliament.

In the beginning of 2022, Butkevičius joined the new party Union of Democrats "For Lithuania", founded by Saulius Skvernelis, who succeeded Butkevičius as prime minister in 2016.

== Education and career timeline ==
- 1977 graduation from Šeduva Secondary School, district of Radviliškis.
- 1977–1979 Military service in Signals-Communications Troops of the Soviet Army, rank Junior Sergeant.
- 1984 Diploma of Engineering Economist, Faculty of Economics, Vilnius Civil Engineering Institute (currently Vilnius Gediminas Technical University)
- 1990–1991 Diploma of Technical Manager, Lithuanian Management Academy
- 1995 Master's Degree in Management, Kaunas University of Technology
- 1994 Traineeship, Management Academy in Würzburg, Germany. 1998, 1999, 2001 – traineeships in the United States of America and Denmark.
- 2008 Doctor's Degree in Economics
- 1982–1985 Industrial Association "Žemūktechnika", Vilkaviškis district
- 1985–1990 Architect, Executive Committee of Vilkaviškis district; Inspector, State Construction and Architecture Unit, Vilkaviškis district
- 1991–1995 Deputy Governor, Vilkaviškis district
- 1995–1996 Director of Market Research and Marketing, Joint Stock Company AB Vilkauta
- 1996–2008 Member of the 7th, 8th, 9th and 10th Seimas, elected in Vilkaviškis electoral constituency No 68 as candidate of the Lithuanian Social Democratic Party. He has served in the following committees: Committee on Budget and Finance (chairman in 2001–2004), Committee on European Affairs (2005–2006) and Committee on Economics (2006–2008)
- 2004–2005 Minister of Finance, 12th and 13th Governments of the Republic of Lithuania
- 2006–2008 Minister of Transport and Communications, 14th Government of the Republic of Lithuania
- 1990–1997 and 2000–2002 Member of the Municipal Council of Vilkaviškis district
- 1995–1997 Member of the Municipal Board of Vilkaviškis district
- 7 December 2012 appointed prime minister by presidential decree

== Personal life ==
In addition to his native Lithuanian, he speaks fluent Russian. His wife is Janina, and they have one daughter.

Political offices
Preceded by Dalia Grybauskaitė	Minister of Finance; 2004–2005	Succeeded by Zigmantas Balčytis
Preceded by Andrius Kubilius	Prime Minister of Lithuania; 2012–2016	Succeeded by Saulius Skvernelis
Party political offices
Preceded by Gediminas Kirkilas	Leader of the Social Democratic Party; 2009–2017	Succeeded by Gintautas Paluckas
Preceded by Česlovas Juršėnas	Social Democratic Party nominee for President of Lithuania; 2009	Succeeded by Zigmantas Balčytis
