= Government of Lithuania =

Government of the Republic of Lithuania
- Lietuvos Respublikos Vyriausybė
- Central government

Overview
- Established: 16 February 1918; 108 years ago
- State: Republic of Lithuania
- Leader: Prime Minister of Lithuania (Mindaugas Sinkevičius)
- Appointed by: President of Lithuania (Gitanas Nausėda)
- Main organ: Cabinet of Lithuania
- Ministries: 14 ministries and 13 non-ministerial departments
- Responsible to: Seimas of the Republic of Lithuania
- Annual budget: €20.613 billion (2024)
- Headquarters: Gediminas Avenue 11, Vilnius
- Website: lrv.lt

The Government of Lithuania, (Note: Lithuanian: Lietuvos Vyriausybė) officially the Government of the Republic of Lithuania (GRL), (Note: Lithuanian: Lietuvos Respublikos Vyriausybė (LRV)) is the cabinet of and exercising executive power in Lithuania. Among other responsibilities, it executes laws and resolutions of the parliament, the Seimas, and the decrees of the President, manages state property and, together with the president, executes the foreign policy of the country. The Government also has the right of legislative initiative, puts together the state budget and presents it to the Seimas for approval.

The Government consists of the prime minister, who is the head of government, and 14 government ministers.

The prime minister is appointed by the president, with the assent of the Seimas. The prime minister then forms the rest of the cabinet, with the assent of the president, and the Government and its programme are subject to approval by the Seimas.

The current Government started its work since July 14, 2026 and is headed by Mindaugas Sinkevičiusas as the prime minister. The government is based on a coalition of the Social Democratic Party, Union of Democrats "For Lithuania" and Lithuanian Farmers, Greens and Christian Families Union.

== Government mandate ==
The Government of the Republic of Lithuania exercises executive power in Lithuania. The powers of the Government are defined by the Constitution and laws of Lithuania.

The Government has the responsibility to administer the affairs of the country, ensure its security and public order. It executes laws and resolutions of the Seimas as well as the decrees of the president. The government coordinates the activities of the ministries and other subordinate institutions, establishes, abolishes and controls government agencies, and submits proposals to the Seimas to establish and abolish ministries. The government disposes of the property of the state and establishes procedures for its management and use.

The Government, along with the Seimas and the president, has the right of legislative initiative in Lithuania. The government prepares draft laws and presents them to the Seimas for consideration. The government also prepares a draft budget and submits it to the Seimas. The Government executes the budget approved by the Seimas.

In foreign affairs, the government establishes diplomatic ties and maintains relations with foreign states and international organizations. The Government shares the responsibility for managing the foreign affairs of the country with the president. The Government proposes and the president approves Lithuania's diplomatic representatives to foreign states and international institutions.

In local government, the Government appoints representatives to the municipalities to monitor whether the municipalities comply with the Constitution and laws of Lithuania and the orders of the Government.

The prime minister is appointed by the president, with the assent of the Seimas. Likewise, the ministers are proposed by the prime minister and appointed by the president. Within 15 days of the appointment, the prime minister presents the Government and its programme to the Seimas for consideration. The Government receives its mandate after the Seimas gives assent to its programme in a majority vote.

The Government is responsible to the Seimas for its activities. Likewise, the ministers are responsible to the Seimas and the president. The Government presents to the Seimas an annual report on its activities and reports to the Seimas on the execution of the budget. Upon the request of the Seimas, the Government or individual ministers must give an account of their activities. The Government is also obliged to inform the public about their activities through the internet and other media, or through meetings with the people.

The Government returns its mandate to the president after the Seimas elections or the elections of the president, or upon the resignation of the Government. The return of the mandate after the elections of the president is largely ceremonial and allows the newly elected head of state to verify that the Government still has the confidence of the Seimas. The Government is obliged to resign when the Seimas twice declines to give its assent to the programme of the newly formed Government, when the Seimas, in a majority secret ballot, expresses no-confidence in the Government or the prime minister, when the prime minister resigns or dies, or when a new government is formed after the elections to the Seimas. If the Seimas expresses no-confidence in the Government, the Government may propose to the president to hold a new election to the Seimas.

The president of Lithuania accepts the resignation of individual ministers. Ministers must resign when the Seimas, in a majority secret ballot, express no-confidence in them. When more than half of the ministers are changed, the Government must seek a renewed mandate from the Seimas or resign.

== Structure ==
The government of the Republic of Lithuania consists of the prime minister and the ministers. The prime minister represents the Government and heads its activities. When the prime minister is not available or unable to hold office, the president may charge one of the ministers to substitute for the prime minister for no more than 60 days.

A minister heads his respective ministry, resolving issues belonging to the competence area of the ministry and discharging other functions provided for by law. Ministers act directly subordinate to the prime minister. Another member of the Government, appointed by the prime minister, may temporarily substitute for a Minister.

=== Ministries ===
Ministries are the structures that allow the ministers to manage the fields assigned to them. Ministries are established as public legal persons and are financed from the state budget.

There are 14 ministries in Lithuania:

Ministry	Area of responsibility	Budget (2024)
Ministry of Agriculture	Agriculture, food industry and fisheries.	€1.246 billion
Ministry of Culture	Cultural and public information policies, copyright, libraries, museums and galleries, ethnic and regional culture and national minorities, cultural education and reading promotion, preserving and digitizing cultural heritage, literature and publishing, music, theatre, visual arts and film.	€0.431 billion
Ministry of Economy and Innovations	Business environment, investment, export, innovation, state-owned enterprises, EU structural support, public procurement, tourism.	€0.468 billion
Ministry of Education, Science and Sports	Formal and non-formal education, science and studies.	€2.278 billion
Ministry of Energy	Fuel, electricity, thermo-energy production and supply.	€0.467 billion
Ministry of Environment	Environmental protection, forestry, utilization of natural resources, geology and hydrometeorology, territorial planning, construction, provision of residents with housing, utilities and housing.	€0.554 billion
Ministry of Finance	Budget, taxation, state debt management, financial services, accounting and reporting, internal audit and internal control, renewal of the state-owned immovable property and Public and Private Partnership.	€2.272 billion
Ministry of Foreign Affairs	Foreign relations and diplomatic network, consular services, international organizations, strategic international projects.	€0.115 billion
Ministry of Health	Health care services, public health, health insurance, patient rights, pharmacy.	€1.426 billion
Ministry of the Interior	Public safety, state border protection, state aid during emergencies and civil protection, migration, reform of the public administration and state governance system, development of local governance, regional development.	€0.853 billion
Ministry of Justice	Legislative process, registers, legal institutions, legal professions, criminal justice, registration of political parties, regulation of religious communities and associations, registration of civil status, civil disputes, protection of industrial property, forensics, consumer rights, compensation to violent crime victims.	€0.167 billion
Ministry of National Defence	National defence system, including policy, training, management, military service and mobilization, intelligence and counterintelligence, international co-operation of institutions of the national defence system, military standardization.	€2.187 billion
Ministry of Social Security and Labour	Family and children, social integration, labor and employment, social insurance, gender equality, youth policy.	€5.776 billion
Ministry of Transport and Communications	Roads and road transport, rail transport, water transport, air transport, traffic safety, transit and logistics, transport environment and transport of dangerous goods, transport accident and incident investigation, information society development, electronic communications, post.	€1.245 billion
		Total budget €20.613 billion

=== Non-ministerial institutions under the Government ===
Government agencies are established to participate in the shaping of a policy and to implement such policy. Government agencies are public legal bodies financed from the state budget.

Government agencies and institutions accountable to the government are:

- Central Election Commission
- Public Management Agency
- National Sports Agency
- Office of the Chief Archivist of Lithuania
- State Data Protection Inspectorate
- Drug, Tobacco and Alcohol Control Department
- State Data Agency
- State Food and Veterinary Service
- Commission on Tax Disputes
- State Enterprise Turto Bankas
- State Nuclear Power Safety Inspectorate
- The Chief Administrative Disputes Commission
- The Communications Regulatory Authority
- Public Procurement Office

== Government operations ==
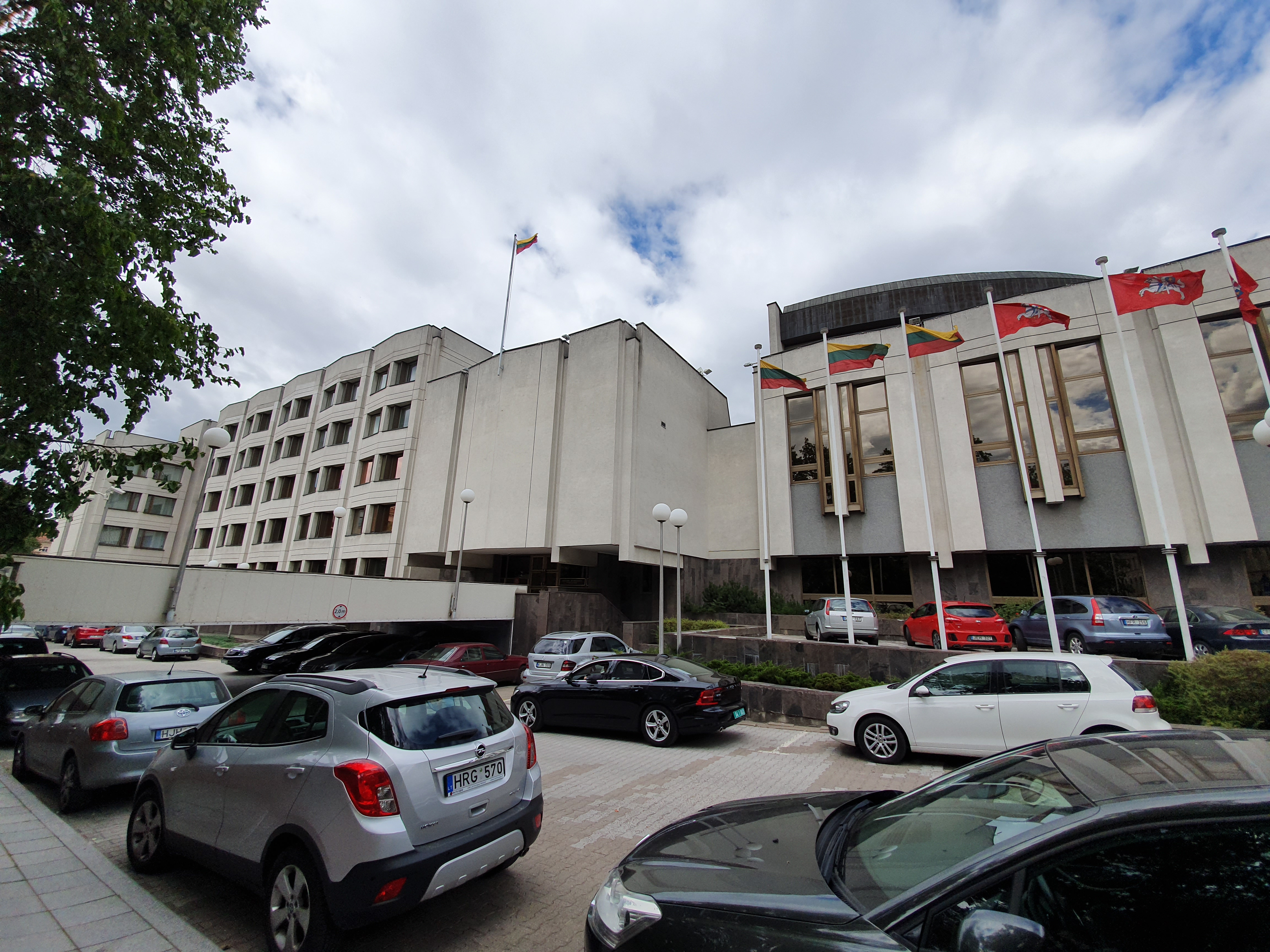
Lithuanian Government building in Vilnius

The Government resolves the affairs of state at its sittings by adopting resolutions by majority vote of all the members of the Government. The Auditor General may also participate in the sittings of the Government. Minutes are taken and audio recordings are made of Government sittings, however, the government sittings have not been universally publicly broadcast.

A Government resolution adopted in a sitting is signed by the prime minister and the Minister of the corresponding branch of the Government.

The prime minister and the ministers are also entitled to attend the sittings of the Seimas, its Committees, Commissions and parliamentary groups, and to convey their opinion on the issues under consideration.

The prime minister and the ministers may not hold any other offices (except being members of the Seimas), may not be employed in business, commercial and other private establishments or enterprises, and may not receive any remuneration other than the salary for their respective Government offices. The members of the Government can, however, receive remuneration for creative activities.

The Office of the Government supports the Government in performing Government's and Prime Minister's functions. The Office of the Government is headed by the Chancellor of the Government.

== Latest government ==
The Sinkevičius Cabinet is the 21st cabinet of the Republic of Lithuania. It consists of Prime Minister Mindaugas Sinkevičius who is the head of government, and 14 ministers from Social Democratic Party, Union of Democrats "For Lithuania", Farmers and Greens Union and Electoral Action of Poles.

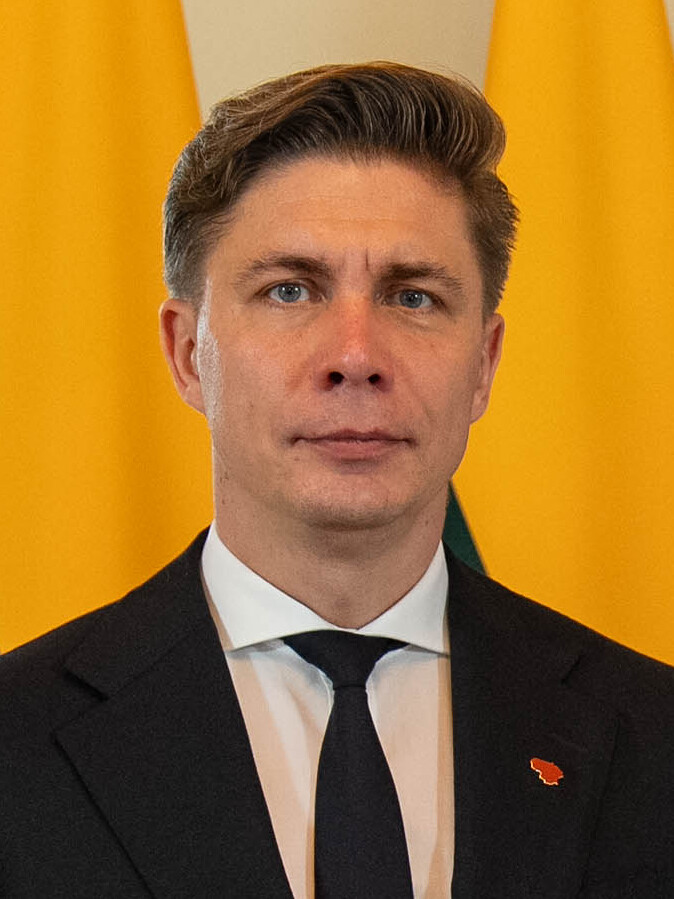
Mindaugas Sinkevičius, prime minister of Lithuania since 2026 July 14th

The cabinet's minister list was sworn in on 14 July 2026.

Position	Name	Party	Office	
Position	Name	Party	Start date	End date
Prime Minister	Mindaugas Sinkevičius	LSDP	14 July 2026	
Minister of Agriculture	Kęstutis Mažeika	DSVL	14 July 2026	
Minister of Culture	Lukas Alsys	LSDP	14 July 2026	
Minister of Economy and Innovation	Edvinas Grikšas	LVŽS	14 July 2026	
Minister of Education, Science and Sports	Raminta Popovienė	LSDP	14 July 2026	
Minister of Energy	Lukas Savickas	DSVL	14 July 2026	
Minister of Environment	Ieva Andriulaitytė	Independent (endorsed by LSDP)	14 July 2026	
Minister of Finance	Taurimas Valys	LSDP	14 July 2026	
Minister of Foreign Affairs	Kęstutis Budrys	Independent (endorsed by President Gitanas Nausėda and LSDP)	14 July 2026	
Minister of Health	Linas Kukuraitis	DSVL	14 July 2026	
Minister of Interior	Martynas Katelynas	LSDP	14 July 2026	
Minister of Justice	Rita Tamašunienė	LLRA-KŠS	14 July 2026	
Minister of National Defence	Robertas Kaunas	LSDP	14 July 2026	
Minister of Social Security and Labour	Inga Ruginienė	LSDP	14 July 2026	
Minister of Transport and Communications	Juras Taminskas	LSDP	14 July 2026	

== Previous governments ==
The current government of Lithuania is the 19th since the restoration of independence on 11 March 1990.

Kazimiera Prunskienė became the first Prime Minister of newly independent Lithuania, appointed by the Supreme Council on 17 March 1990, although the law governing the mandate of the government was only adopted on the 22 March. Her government resigned less than a year later and was followed by those of Albertas Šimėnas, Gediminas Vagnorius, Aleksandras Abišala. These early governments were primarily occupied with ensuring the diplomatic recognition and economic support for the new country and managing tensions with the Soviet Union.

Following the first election to the Seimas, Democratic Labor Party of Lithuania formed the government headed by Bronislovas Lubys, a prominent industrialist, who headed the government until the first presidential election and was followed by Adolfas Šleževičius. His government was mainly preoccupied with ensuring the monetary stability of the country, following years of high inflation. Šleževičius was forced to resign in February 1996, amid a row regarding a deposit he had withdrawn from a local bank just days before its collapse. Laurynas Stankevičius was appointed in his stead.

The 1996 parliamentary election was won by the Homeland Union. The government was formed by the Homeland Union and Lithuanian Christian Democrats, with Gediminas Vagnorius appointed as the prime minister for the second time. In spring 2009, the Government survived the vote of no-confidence in the Seimas, but resigned shortly thereafter, with the popular then-mayor of Vilnius Rolandas Paksas appointed to the post of Prime Minister. His government lasted only 5 months, before he publicly renounced and refused to sign the privatization agreement for Mazeikiu Nafta oil refinery, resigning as a result. Andrius Kubilius served as the prime minister from November 1999 until the next election to Seimas in October 2000.

The election resulted in Rolandas Paksas, now part of Liberal Union of Lithuania, serving as the prime minister for the second time. His government, formed together with New Union (Social Liberals), lasted only seven months before being brought down by disagreements within the coalition. New Union then joined the Government together with Social Democratic Party of Lithuania, with former president Algirdas Brazauskas as the prime minister.

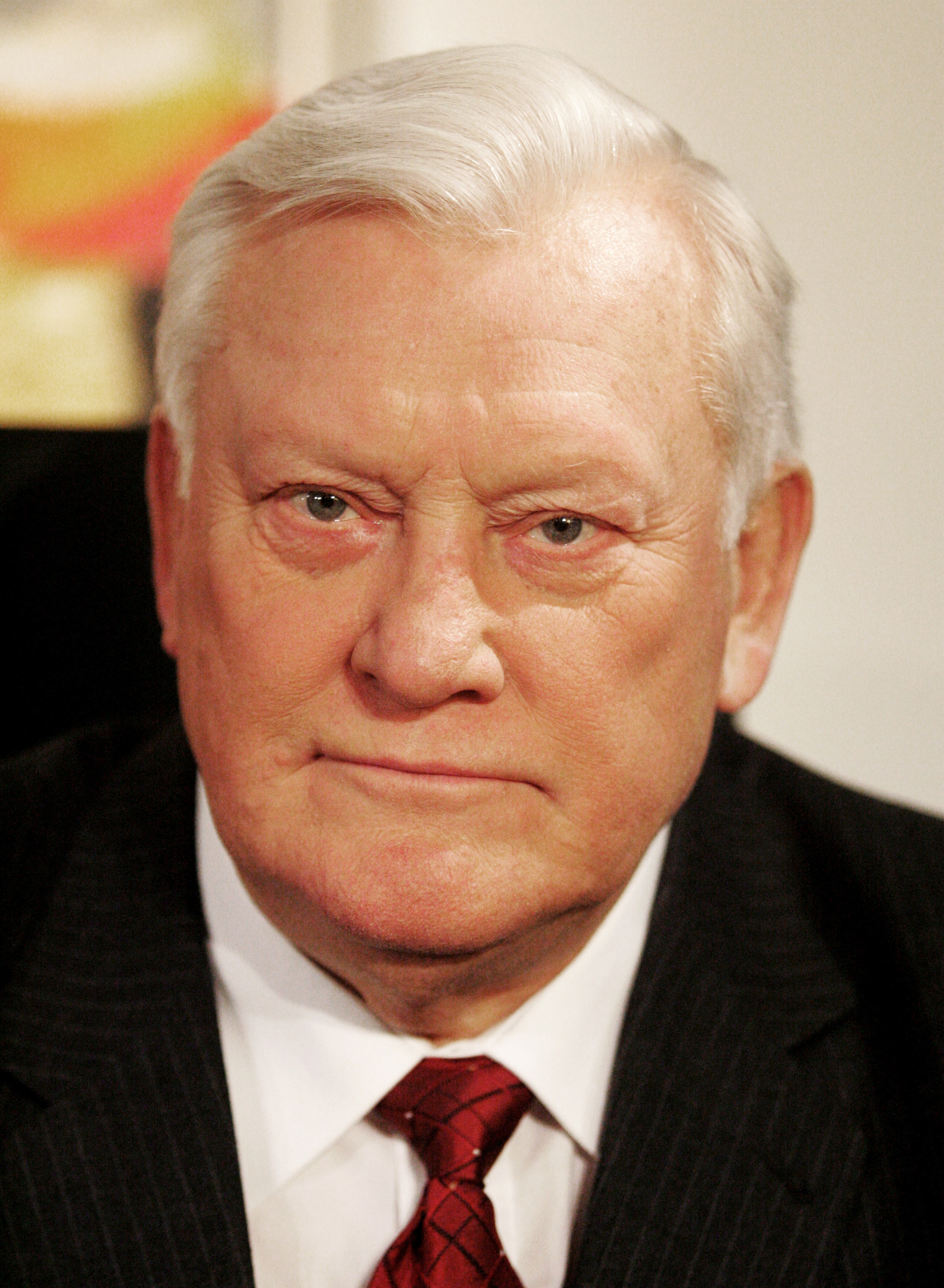
Algirdas Brazauskas served as the Prime Minister from 2001 to 2006

Algirdas Brazauskas became the first Prime Minister of Lithuania to remain in power after the election to Seimas in 2004, forming the minority 13th Government with New Union and Labour Party. The Government resigned in May 2006, citing difficulties in working with the opposition. Gediminas Kirkilas served as the prime minister until the next election to the Seimas in 2008.

The coalition of Homeland Union, Liberal Movement, Liberal and Centre Union and the short-lived National Resurrection Party formed the 15th government of Lithuania, with Andrius Kubilius as the prime minister for the second time. Despite the deep economic crisis and taking unpopular decisions, his Government became the first Lithuanian government to last the full term of the parliament.

Government	Prime minister	Party of the prime minister	Term started
1st Government	Kazimiera Prunskienė	Independent (endorsed by Sąjūdis)	17 March 1990
2nd Government	Albertas Šimėnas	Independent (endorsed by Sąjūdis)	10 January 1991
3rd Government	Gediminas Vagnorius	Independent (endorsed by Sąjūdis)	13 January 1991
4th Government	Aleksandras Abišala	Independent (endorsed by Sąjūdis)	21 July 1992
5th Government	Bronislovas Lubys	Independent (endorsed by Democratic Labour Party of Lithuania)	12 December 1992
6th Government	Adolfas Šleževičius	Democratic Labour Party of Lithuania	10 March 1993
7th Government	Laurynas Stankevičius	Democratic Labour Party of Lithuania	23 February 1996
8th Government	Gediminas Vagnorius	Homeland Union	4 December 1996
9th Government	Rolandas Paksas	Homeland Union	1 June 1999
10th Government	Andrius Kubilius	Homeland Union	3 November 1999
11th Government	Rolandas Paksas	Liberal Union of Lithuania	27 October 2000
12th Government	Algirdas Brazauskas	Social Democratic Party of Lithuania	4 July 2001
13th Government	Algirdas Brazauskas	Social Democratic Party of Lithuania	29 November 2004
14th Government	Gediminas Kirkilas	Social Democratic Party of Lithuania	6 July 2006
15th Government	Andrius Kubilius	Homeland Union	28 November 2008
16th Government	Algirdas Butkevičius	Social Democratic Party of Lithuania	13 December 2012
17th Government	Saulius Skvernelis	Independent (endorsed by Lithuanian Peasant and Greens Union)	13 December 2016
18th Government	Ingrida Šimonytė	Independent (endorsed by Homeland Union)	11 December 2020
19th Government	Gintautas Paluckas	Social Democratic Party of Lithuania	12 December 2024
20th Government	Inga Ruginienė	Social Democratic Party of Lithuania	25 September 2025
21th Government	Mindaugas Sinkevičius	Social Democratic Party of Lithuania	TBA
Sources: Lithuanian Government, Zárate's Political Collections, Wolfram Nordsieck

== See also ==
- Elections in Lithuania
- List of governments of Lithuania (since 1990)
- List of governments of Lithuania (1918–1940)
