= Ruginienė Cabinet =

20th cabinet of Lithuania

- 20th Cabinet of Lithuania

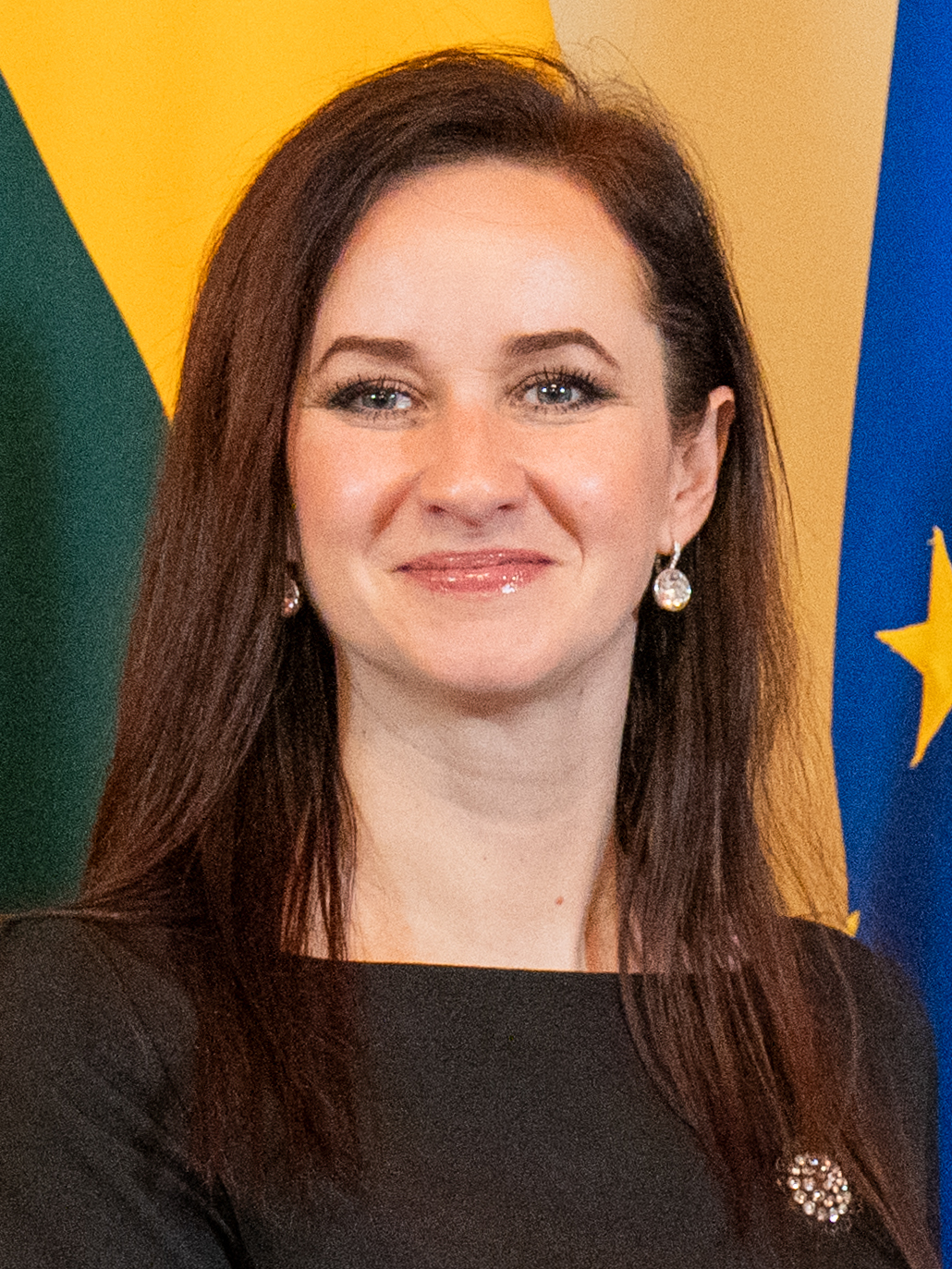
- Date formed: 25 September 2025
- Date dissolved: 14 July 2026

People and organisations
- Head of state: Gitanas Nausėda
- Head of government: Inga Ruginienė
- No. of ministers: 14
- Ministers removed: 2
- Member parties: Social Democratic Party (LSDP); Dawn of Nemunas (PPNA) (until 2026); Farmers and Greens Union (LVŽS); Electoral Action of Poles (LLRA-KŠS)
- Status in legislature: Majority coalition government (2025–2026); Caretaker government (2026)
- Opposition cabinet: None
- Opposition parties: Dawn of Nemunas (PPNA) (from 2026); Homeland Union (TS–LKD); Democrats "For Lithuania" (DSVL); Liberals' Movement (LS); Centre-Right Union (CDS); National Alliance (NS)
- Opposition leader: None

History
- Election: 2024
- Legislature term: Fourteenth Seimas
- Predecessor: Paluckas Cabinet
- Successor: Sinkevičius Cabinet

The Ruginienė Cabinet was the 20th cabinet of the national government of the Republic of Lithuania. It consisted of the Prime Minister Inga Ruginienė as the Head of Government, and 14 government ministers from the Social Democratic Party, Dawn of Nemunas, Farmers and Greens Union and Electoral Action of Poles.

The cabinet was formed on 25 September 2025, succeeding the Paluckas Cabinet. On 6 June 2026, the Social Democratic Party announced the collapse of the government coalition with the Dawn of Nemunas (PPNA) over growing disagreements. On 23 June, Ruginienė and her entire cabinet resigned after the PPNA officially withdrew from the coalition. She and her cabinet continued to serve in an acting capacity until 14 July, when the Sinkevičius Cabinet was sworn in.

== Cabinet ==
The cabinet's minister list was sworn in on 25 September 2025.

Position	Name	Party	Office	
Position	Name	Party	Start date	End date
Prime Minister	Inga Ruginienė	LSDP	25 September 2025	14 July 2026
Minister of Agriculture	Andrius Palionis	Independent (endorsed by PPNA)	25 September 2025	14 July 2026
Minister of Culture	Ignotas Adomavičius	PPNA	25 September 2025	3 October 2025
Minister of Culture	Vaida Aleknavičienė	LSDP	11 November 2025	14 July 2026
Minister of Economy and Innovation	Edvinas Grikšas	LVŽS	25 September 2025	14 July 2026
Minister of Education, Science and Sports	Raminta Popovienė	LSDP	25 September 2025	14 July 2026
Minister of Energy	Žygimantas Vaičiūnas	Independent (endorsed by President Gitanas Nausėda and LSDP)	25 September 2025	14 July 2026
Minister of Environment	Kastytis Žuromskas	PPNA	25 September 2025	14 July 2026
Minister of Finance	Kristupas Vaitiekūnas	LSDP	25 September 2025	14 July 2026
Minister of Foreign Affairs	Kęstutis Budrys	Independent (endorsed by President Gitanas Nausėda and LSDP)	25 September 2025	14 July 2026
Minister of Health	Marija Jakubauskienė	Independent (endorsed by LSDP)	25 September 2025	14 July 2026
Minister of Interior	Vladislav Kondratovič	LSDP	25 September 2025	14 July 2026
Minister of Justice	Rita Tamašunienė	LLRA-KŠS	25 September 2025	14 July 2026
Minister of National Defence	Dovilė Šakalienė	LSDP	25 September 2025	22 October 2025
Minister of National Defence	Robertas Kaunas	LSDP	11 November 2025	14 July 2026
Minister of Social Security and Labour	Jūratė Zailskienė	LSDP	25 September 2025	14 July 2026
Minister of Transport and Communications	Juras Taminskas	LSDP	25 September 2025	14 July 2026
