= Sinkevičius Cabinet =

21st cabinet of Lithuania

- 21st Cabinet of Lithuania

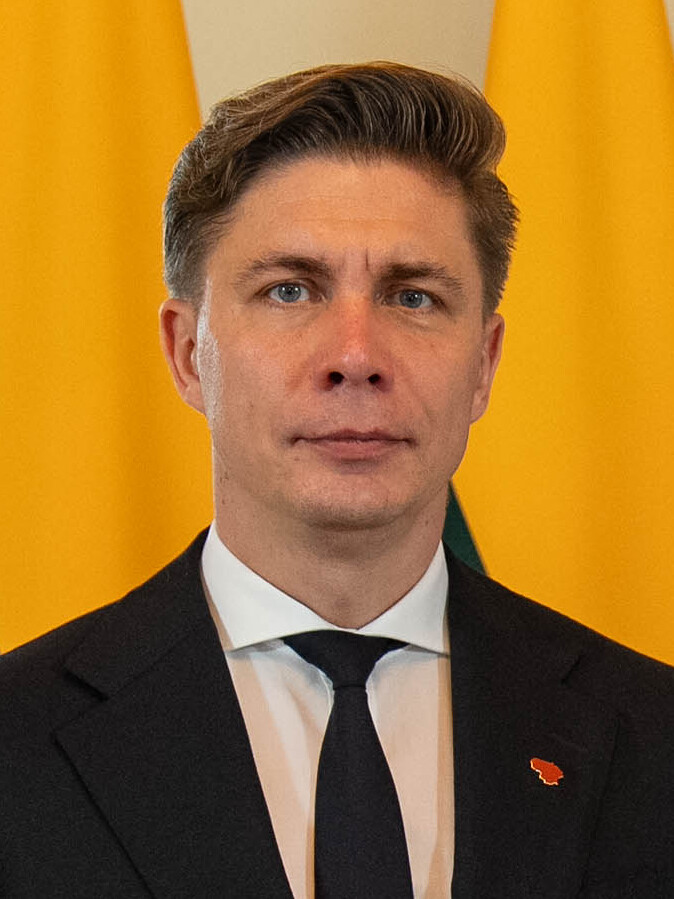
- Date formed: 14 July 2026

People and organisations
- Head of state: Gitanas Nausėda
- Head of government: Mindaugas Sinkevičius
- No. of ministers: 14
- Member parties: Social Democratic Party (LSDP); Democrats "For Lithuania" (DSVL); Farmers and Greens Union (LVŽS); Electoral Action of Poles (LLRA-KŠS)
- Status in legislature: Majority coalition government (2026–present)
- Opposition cabinet: None
- Opposition parties: Homeland Union (TS–LKD); Dawn of Nemunas (PPNA); Liberals' Movement (LS); National Alliance (NS); People and Justice Union (TTS)
- Opposition leader: None

History
- Election: 2024
- Legislature term: Fourteenth Seimas
- Predecessor: Ruginienė Cabinet

The Sinkevičius Cabinet is the 21st cabinet of the Republic of Lithuania. It consists of Prime Minister Mindaugas Sinkevičius who is the head of government, and 14 ministers from Social Democratic Party, Union of Democrats "For Lithuania", Farmers and Greens Union and Electoral Action of Poles.

== Ministers count ==
Party	Number
LSDP	7 ministers (1 PM)
DSVL	3 Ministers
LVŽS	1 Minister
LLRA-KŠS	1 Minister
Independents	2 Ministers

== Cabinet ==
The cabinet's minister list was sworn in on 14 July 2026.

Position	Name	Party	Office	
Position	Name	Party	Start date	End date
Prime Minister	Mindaugas Sinkevičius	LSDP	14 July 2026	
Minister of Agriculture	Kęstutis Mažeika	DSVL	14 July 2026	
Minister of Culture	Lukas Alsys	LSDP	14 July 2026	
Minister of Economy and Innovation	Edvinas Grikšas	LVŽS	14 July 2026	
Minister of Education, Science and Sports	Raminta Popovienė	LSDP	14 July 2026	
Minister of Energy	Lukas Savickas	DSVL	14 July 2026	
Minister of Environment	Ieva Andriulaitytė	Independent (endorsed by LSDP)	14 July 2026	
Minister of Finance	Taurimas Valys	LSDP	14 July 2026	
Minister of Foreign Affairs	Kęstutis Budrys	Independent (endorsed by President Gitanas Nausėda and LSDP)	14 July 2026	
Minister of Health	Linas Kukuraitis	DSVL	14 July 2026	
Minister of Interior	Martynas Katelynas	LSDP	14 July 2026	
Minister of Justice	Rita Tamašunienė	LLRA-KŠS	14 July 2026	
Minister of National Defence	Robertas Kaunas	LSDP	14 July 2026	
Minister of Social Security and Labour	Inga Ruginienė	LSDP	14 July 2026	
Minister of Transport and Communications	Juras Taminskas	LSDP	14 July 2026	
