= Paluckas Cabinet =

19th cabinet of Lithuania

- 19th Cabinet of Lithuania

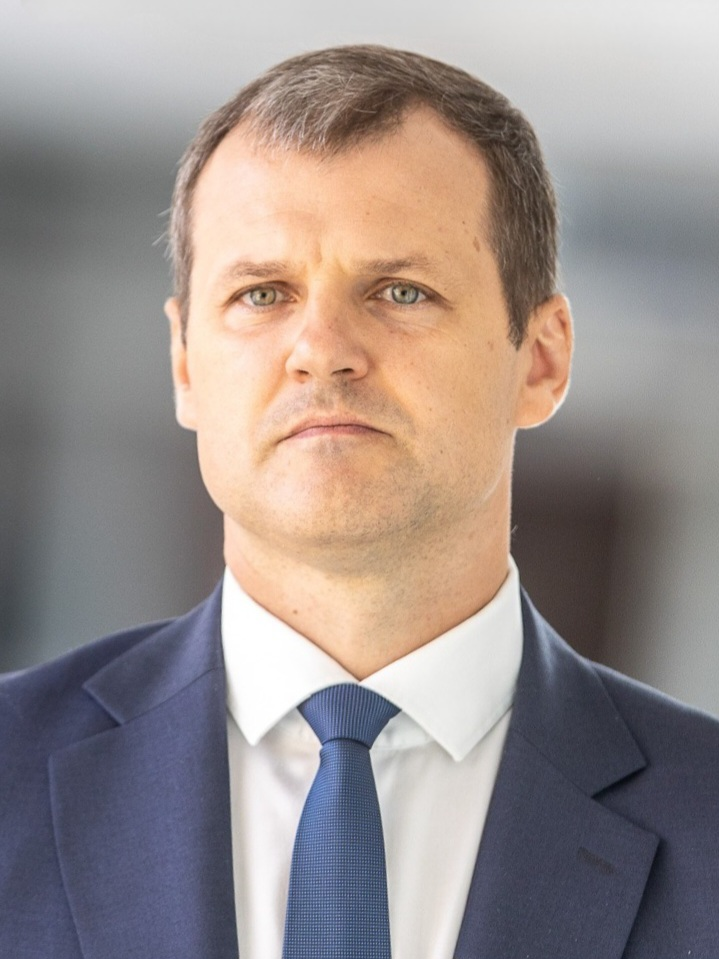
- Date formed: 12 December 2024
- Date dissolved: 25 September 2025

People and organisations
- Head of state: Gitanas Nausėda
- Head of government: Gintautas Paluckas (until 4 August 2025); Rimantas Šadžius (acting)
- No. of ministers: 14
- Member parties: Social Democratic Party (LSDP); Dawn of Nemunas (PPNA); Democrats "For Lithuania" (DSVL)
- Status in legislature: Majority coalition government (until 4 August 2025); Caretaker government (from 4 August 2025)
- Opposition parties: Homeland Union (TS–LKD); Liberal Movement (LS); Farmers and Greens Union (LVŽS); Electoral Action of Poles (LLRA-KŠS); National Alliance (NS); Freedom and Justice (PLT)

History
- Election: 2024
- Legislature term: Fourteenth Seimas
- Predecessor: Šimonytė Cabinet
- Successor: Ruginienė Cabinet

The Paluckas Cabinet was the 19th cabinet of the national government of the Republic of Lithuania. It consisted of Prime Minister Gintautas Paluckas as the Head of Government, and 14 government ministers from the Social Democratic Party of Lithuania, Union of Democrats "For Lithuania", and Dawn of Nemunas.

The cabinet was formed 12 December 2024, lasting until August 2025 when the cabinet's resignation was accepted on 4 August after Paluckas resigned due to financial scandals on 31 July 2025. All members of the cabinet (except Paluckas) continued to serve in a caretaker capacity under acting Prime Minister Rimantas Šadžius, previously Finance Minister, following the cabinet's dissolution.

== History ==
On the night of 14 October, Vilija Blinkevičiūtė and Saulius Skvernelis, the leaders of the LSDP and the DSVL respectively, agreed to cooperate in the second round and to form a coalition government afterwards. LVŽS joined the agreement on 15 October. On 30 October, Blinkevičiūtė confirmed that she will not be prime minister and will continue to work as a member of the European Parliament, citing her age and health. Gintautas Paluckas became the party's candidate for Prime Minister.

On 7 November, the LSDP invited the DSVL and Dawn of Nemunas to form a ruling coalition, which would encompass 86 of the 141 seats in the Seimas. On 21 November, Paluckas was nominated as the Prime Minister by the Seimas, with 88 votes in favor.

In power, the Paluckas Cabinet raised Lithuania's defense funding to its highest level in the country's history, reformed the retirement fund system, re-established the option for low-income families to choose a public electricity supplier, increased child benefits and funding for education, abolished premiums for private healthcare services which are financed by the state healthcare fund, and established a road fund. On 27 June 2025, a taxation reform put forward by the Social Democrats was approved by the Seimas, which established a progressive taxation system for personal income with three tax brackets, raised corporate tax and established new taxes on sugar and non-life insurance.

In July 2025, the public scrutiny and protests over Paluckas' questionable business deals and links were mounting. By the end of the month, President Gitanas Nausėda pressured Paluckas to consider his options, while the Speaker of the Seimas Saulius Skvernelis threatened to pull out of the coalition government if Paluckas will not resign.

Paluckas resigned on 31 July 2025. The resignation of the rest of the cabinet was officially accepted 4 August 2025 but members of the cabinet (except Paluckas) continued to serve in a caretaker capacity with Finance Minister Rimantas Šadžius acting as PM in a caretaker capacity.

Paluckas' resignation was the first resignation of Prime Minister of Lithuania since Algirdas Brazauskas in 2006. Also, it was the first time when cabinet had not served full parliamentary term since Kirkilas Cabinet.

== Cabinet ==
The cabinet's minister list was sworn-in on 12 December 2024 by the President of Lithuania.

| Position | Name | Party | Office | |
| Position | Name | Party | Start date | End date |
|---|---|---|---|---|
| Prime Minister | Gintautas Paluckas | LSDP | 12 December 2024 | 4 August 2025 |
| Prime Minister | Rimantas Šadžius (acting) | LSDP | 4 August 2025 | 25 September 2025 |
| Minister of Agriculture | Ignas Hofmanas | Independent (endorsed by PPNA) | 12 December 2024 | 25 September 2025 |
| Minister of Culture | Šarūnas Birutis | LSDP | 12 December 2024 | 25 September 2025 |
| Minister of Economy and Innovation | Lukas Savickas | DSVL | 12 December 2024 | 25 September 2025 |
| Minister of Education, Science and Sports | Raminta Popovienė | LSDP | 12 December 2024 | 25 September 2025 |
| Minister of Energy | Žygimantas Vaičiūnas | DSVL | 12 December 2024 | 25 September 2025 |
| Minister of Environment | Povilas Poderskis | Independent (endorsed by PPNA) | 12 December 2024 | 25 September 2025 |
| Minister of Finance | Rimantas Šadžius | LSDP | 12 December 2024 | 25 September 2025 |
| Minister of Foreign Affairs | Kęstutis Budrys | Independent (endorsed by President Gitanas Nausėda and LSDP) | 12 December 2024 | 25 September 2025 |
| Minister of Health | Marija Jakubauskienė | Independent (endorsed by LSDP) | 12 December 2024 | 25 September 2025 |
| Minister of Interior | Vladislav Kondratovič | LSDP | 12 December 2024 | 25 September 2025 |
| Minister of Justice | Rimantas Mockus | Independent (endorsed by PPNA) | 12 December 2024 | 25 September 2025 |
| Minister of National Defence | Dovilė Šakalienė | LSDP | 12 December 2024 | 25 September 2025 |
| Minister of Social Security and Labour | Inga Ruginienė | LSDP | 12 December 2024 | 25 September 2025 |
| Minister of Transport and Communications | Eugenijus Sabutis | LSDP | 12 December 2024 | 25 September 2025 |

== Party breakdown ==
| Party | Leader | Ideology | Members of the Seimas | Ministers |
|---|---|---|---|---|
| Social Democratic Party of Lithuania | Gintautas Paluckas | Social democracy | 52 / 141 | 7 / 14 |
| Dawn of Nemunas | Remigijus Žemaitaitis | Populism | 20 / 141 | 0 / 14 |
| Union of Democrats "For Lithuania" | Saulius Skvernelis | Green conservatism | 14 / 141 | 2 / 14 |
| Independents | | | | 5 / 14 (Note: 3 independents were endorsed by PPNA and 2 were endorsed by LSDP) |
| Total | | | 86 / 141 | 14 |
