= Edvinas Grikšas =

Lithuanian politician (born 1991)

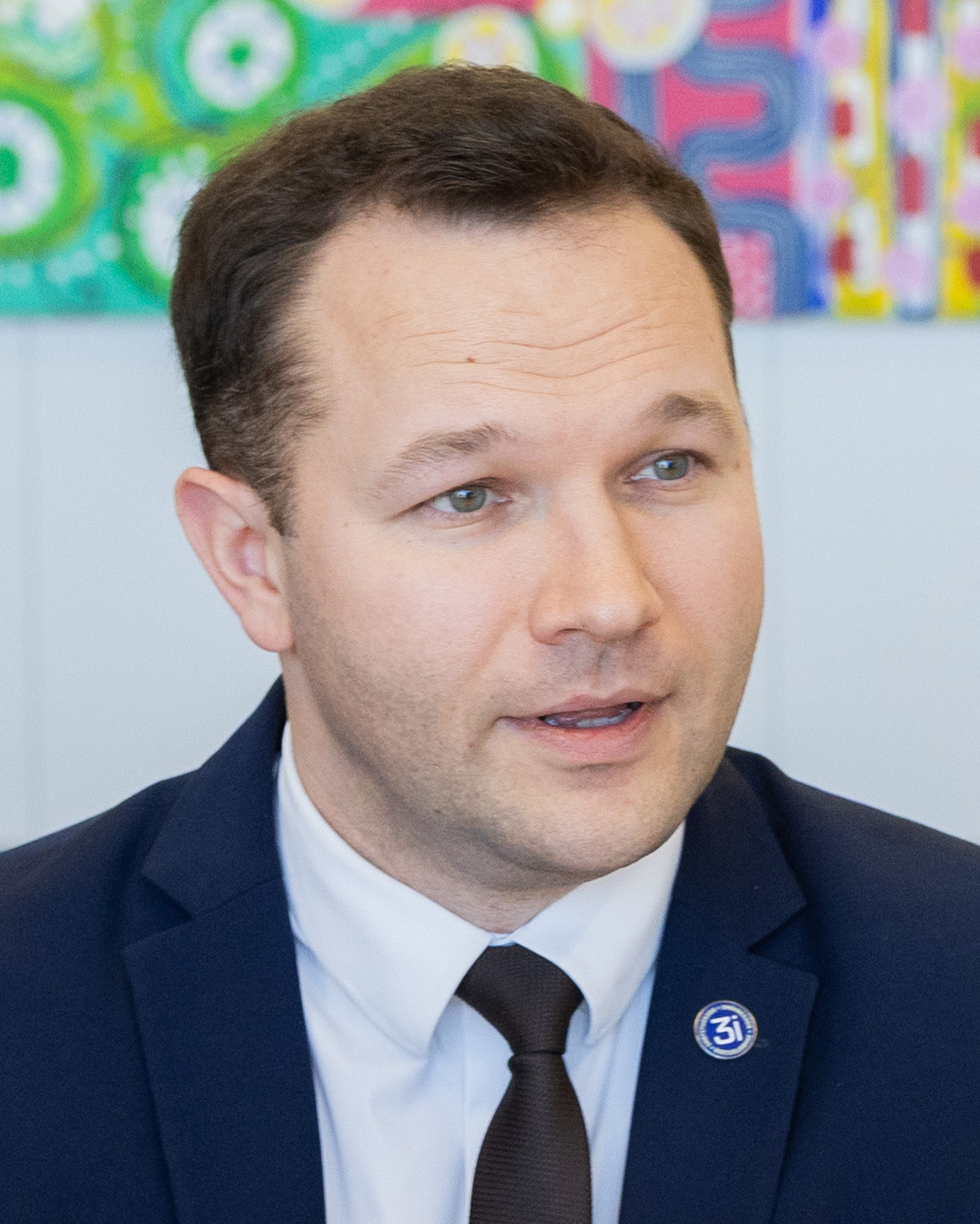
- Grikšas in 2026

Minister of Economy and Innovation
- Incumbent
- Assumed office 25 September 2025
- Prime Minister: Inga Ruginienė; Mindaugas Sinkevičius
- Preceded by: Lukas Savickas

Personal details
- Born: 31 May 1991 (age 35)
- Party: Lithuanian Farmers and Greens Union

Edvinas Grikšas (born 31 May 1991) is a Lithuanian politician serving as minister of economy and innovation since 2025. From 2021 to 2025, he served as head of the innovation policy department of the Ministry of Economy and Innovation.
