= Milda Dargužaitė =

Lithuanian businessman (born 1976)

Milda Dargužaitė (born 1976) is a Lithuanian Manager, since December 2016 Chancellor in the Office of the Government of the Republic of Lithuania. She was the Managing General Director of Invest Lithuania. She worked as Co-head of the Strategic Asset Allocation Team at Goldman Sachs in New York City.

== Biography ==
Dargužaitė graduated from the High School in Kaunas and lived in the United States for 17 years.
