= MPHS =

MPHS may refer to:

== United States ==
- Miller Place High School, Miller Place, New York
- Manlius Pebble Hill School, DeWitt, New York
- Marysville Pilchuck High School, Marysville, Washington
- Memorial Private High School, Houston, Texas
- Mountain Pointe High School, Phoenix, Arizona
- Myers Park High School, Charlotte, North Carolina
- Myrtle Point High School, Oregon

== Elsewhere ==
- Hulu Selangor Municipal Council (Malay: Majlis Perbandaran Hulu Selangor), Malaysian local government body
- May Pen High School, Clarendon, Jamaica

== See also ==
- Mount Pleasant High School (disambiguation)
- MPH (disambiguation)
