= Vaida Aleknavičienė =

Lithuanian politician (born 1976)

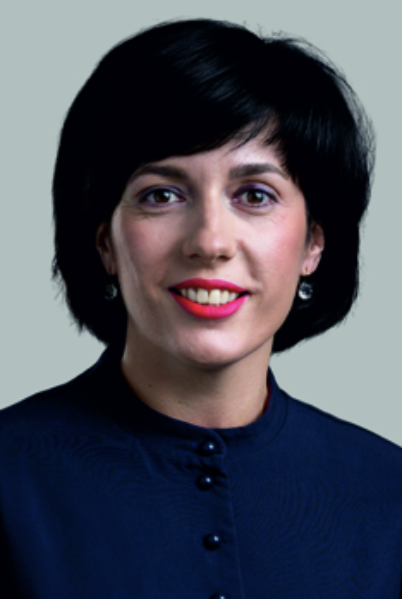
- Aleknavičienė in 2025

Minister of Culture
- In office 11 November 2025 – 14 July 2026
- Prime Minister: Inga Ruginienė
- Preceded by: Raminta Popovienė (acting)
- Succeeded by: Lukas Alsys

Member of the Seimas
- Incumbent
- Assumed office 14 November 2024
- Preceded by: Liudas Jonaitis
- Constituency: West Žiemgala

Personal details
- Born: 10 August 1976 (age 49)
- Party: Social Democratic Party

Vaida Aleknavičienė (born 10 August 1976) is a Lithuanian politician of the Social Democratic Party who was elected member of the Seimas in the 2024 parliamentary election. She previously served as deputy mayor of the Joniškis District Municipality.

She has been serving as the Minister of Culture since 11 November 2025.
