= Vladislav Kondratovič =

Lithuanian politician (born 1972)

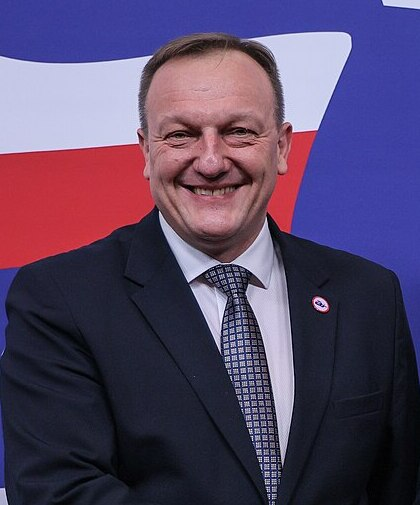
- Kondratovič in 2025

Minister of the Interior
- In office 12 December 2024 – 14 July 2026
- Prime Minister: Gintautas Paluckas; Rimantas Šadžius (acting); Inga Ruginienė
- Preceded by: Agnė Bilotaitė
- Succeeded by: Martynas Katelynas

Acting Minister of National Defence
- In office 22 October 2025 – 11 November 2025
- Prime Minister: Inga Ruginienė
- Preceded by: Dovilė Šakalienė
- Succeeded by: Robertas Kaunas

Personal details
- Born: 25 February 1972 (age 54) Nemėžis, Vilnius district, Lithuanian SSR, Soviet Union
- Party: Social Democratic Party

Vladislav Kondratovič (Polish: Władysław Kondratowicz; born 25 February 1972) is a Lithuanian politician of Polish ethnicity, member of the Social Democratic Party serving as minister of the interior since 2024. He previously served as deputy minister of transport from 2013 to 2014 and from 2019 to 2020.
