= Ignotas Adomavičius =

Lithuanian politician (born 1983)

Minister of Culture
- In office 25 September 2025 – 3 October 2025
- Prime Minister: Inga Ruginienė
- Preceded by: Šarūnas Birutis
- Succeeded by: Raminta Popovienė (Acting)

Personal details
- Born: 5 May 1983 (age 43)
- Party: Dawn of Nemunas
- Other political affiliations: Liberals' Movement (2010–2024)

Ignotas Adomavičius (born 5 May 1983) is a Lithuanian politician who served as minister of culture in 2025 for 9 days. He previously served as advisor to Agnė Širinskienė and Raimondas Šukys. From 2010 to 2024, he was a member of the Liberals' Movement. In 2023, he participated in Lietuvos balsas. The appointment of Adomavičius as minister of culture prompted nationwide protests, referred to as the "Cultural Revolt", organized by workers and professionals in the cultural sector. The demonstrations were directed against the minister, citing concerns over his perceived lack of competence and his affiliation with a politically controversial party.

Adomavičius came under further controversy after an interview with news portal Lrytas.lt, in which he refused to give answers regarding the political status of Crimea and the extent to which Lithuania should support Ukraine during the Russian invasion. After this interview was published, the Office of the President indicated that Adomavičius's refusal to answer could warrant his removal from office. Adomavičius resigned from the position of Culture Minister on 3 October 2025, shortly after Prime Minister Inga Ruginienė announced that she would dismiss him from office if he did not do so.

He is a current candidate in the 2026 northern nalšia district by-election of Nemūno aušra.
