= Public Management Agency (Lithuania) =

Agency under the Government of Lithuania

- Viešojo valdymo agentūra
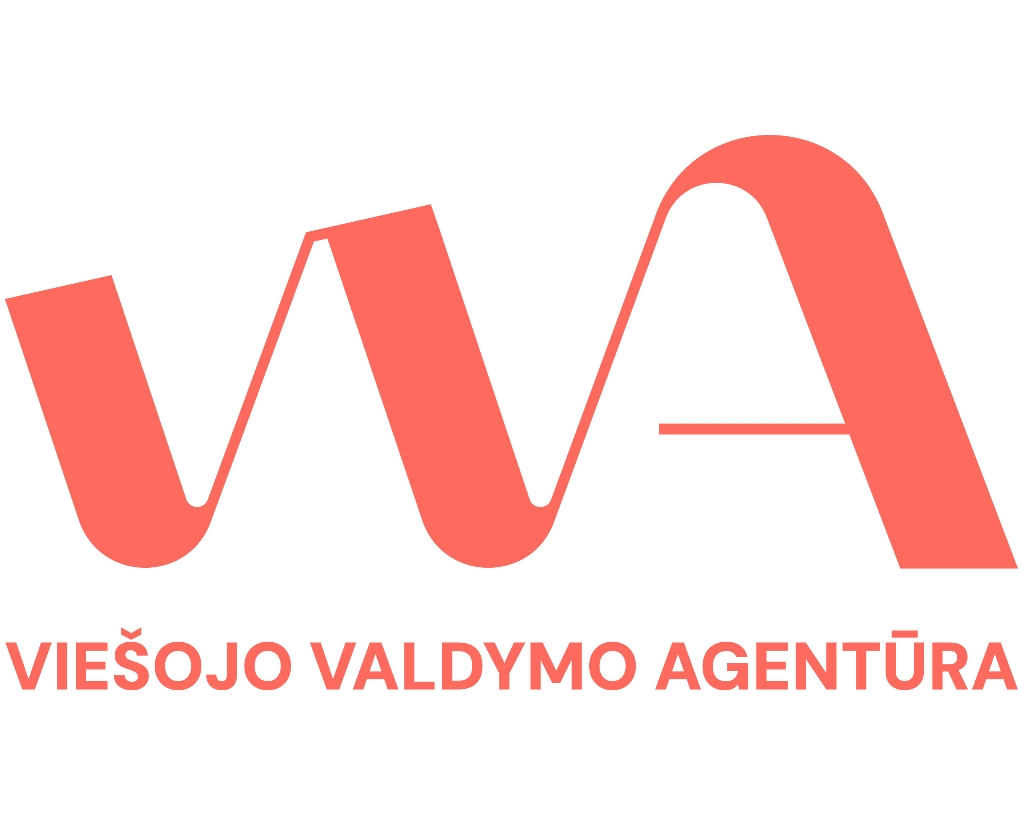

Agency overview
- Formed: 1 January 2023
- Jurisdiction: Government of Lithuania
- Headquarters: Šventaragio g. 2, LT-01510 Vilnius, Lithuania
- Employees: 83
- Annual budget: €1.7 m
- Agency executive: Ana Selčinskienė

The Public Management Agency (Lithuanian: Viešojo valdymo agentūra) is the government agency that shapes human resources management policy in the public sector and ensures the implementation of strategic activities. The agency is responsible for attracting individuals with the right competences to work in the civil service.

== Official duties ==
The agency’s activities include monitoring and controlling the implementation of the provisions of the Law on the Civil Service and improving the quality of training for civil servants. It is also responsible for drafting legislation related to the civil service, managing the Civil Service Register and the Civil Service Information System, and handling recruitment for civil service positions.

== History ==
The Civil Service Department under the Ministry of the Interior of the Republic of Lithuania (established on the basis of the Civil Service Department of the Ministry of Governance Reforms and Local Self-Government Affairs) was founded in 2002. In 2013, the department became the Civil Service Department subordinated to the government, and from that year it began conducting recruitment for civil service positions in the Vilnius region. In 2019, the institution was reorganized into the Civil Service Department under the Ministry of the Interior and started managing recruitment for civil service positions across the entire country. In the same year, the function of issuing service passports was transferred to the Migration Department. In 2023, the department was restructured into the Public Management Agency.

== Director ==
The current director of the agency is Ana Selčinskienė.

=== Previous directors ===
From 2002 to 2010 and from 2013 to 2017, the head was Osvaldas Šarmavičius.

From 2011 to 2013, the head was Laima Tuleikienė.

From 2018 to 2022, the head was Gediminas Miškinis.

From 2023 to 2024, the head was Artūras Palekas.
