= State Data Agency =

Institution in Lithuania

- Valstybinė duomenų agentūra

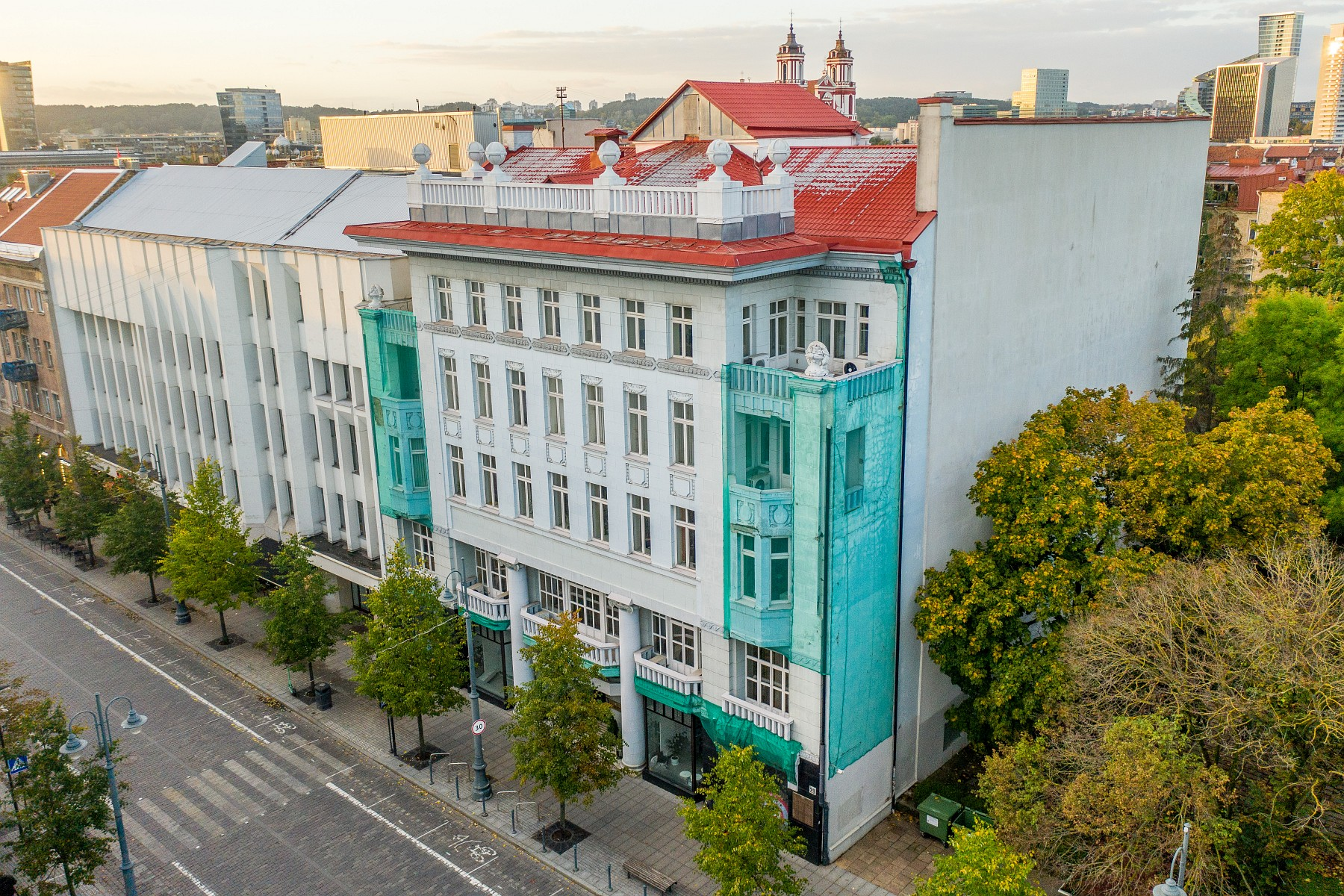

Agency overview
- Formed: 6 September 1919 (restored 18 April 1990)
- Headquarters: Gedimino pr. 29, 01500 Vilnius, Lithuania
- Parent agency: Government of Lithuania
- Website: vda.lrv.lt

The State Data Agency of Lithuania (Lithuanian: Valstybinė duomenų agentūra), sometimes referred as the National Data Agency, and until 2023 known as the Department of Statistics of Lithuania (Lithuanian: Lietuvos statistikos departamentas), officially the Department of Statistics to the Government of the Republic of Lithuania, is an institution in Lithuania which is responsible for collecting, processing, presenting and analysing statistics concerning the topics economy, society and environment, and governance regarding the state data. It is subordinate directly to the Government of Lithuania. The agency also supplies data to Eurostat.

A Director General, appointed by the Prime Minister, oversees its operations. Several commissions and working groups analyze its operations and suggest improvements. An advisory body, the Statistical Council, consists of representatives from the governmental bodies, NGOs, researchers, the media, and other interested parties; the council's makeup and operations are subject to governmental regulation.

== History ==
The origins of statistics collection in Lithuania can be traced back to the 16th century, with the 1528 census of the Grand Duchy of Lithuania. An institution to collect statistics in the Republic of Lithuania was first established on 6 September 1919, as the General Department of Statistics. The first census of Lithuania was carried out in 1923. The institution in its current form was re-established on 18 April 1990 and codified by the Law on Statistics of the Republic of Lithuania. The institution became a member of the European Statistical System in 2004.

On 1 January 2023, the department was reorganized into an agency, as part of the Lithuanian Governance reform.

== See also ==
- Demographics of Lithuania
- Eurostat
