= Martynas Katelynas =

Lithuanian politician (born 1995)

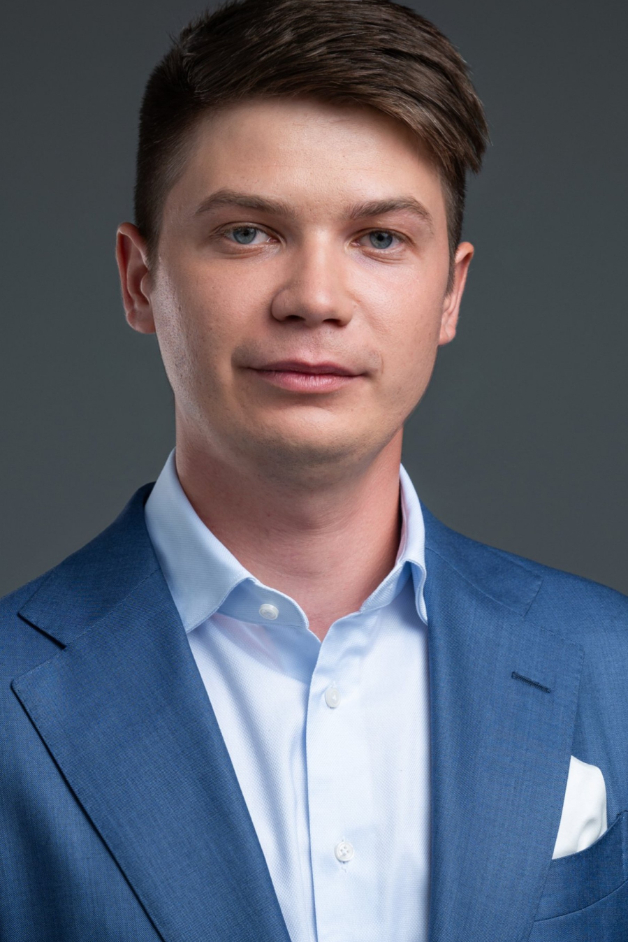
- Katelynas in 2024

Minister of the Interior
- Incumbent
- Assumed office 14 July 2026
- Prime Minister: Mindaugas Sinkevičius
- Preceded by: Vladislav Kondratovič

Member of the Seimas
- Incumbent
- Assumed office 14 November 2024
- Preceded by: Juozas Baublys
- Constituency: Dzūkija

Personal details
- Born: 14 May 1995 (age 31)
- Party: Social Democratic Party (since 2024)
- Other political affiliations: National Alliance (2020–2022)

Martynas Katelynas (born 14 May 1995) is a Lithuanian politician serving as a member of the Seimas since 2024. He has been nominated to serve as minister of the interior in the cabinet of Mindaugas Sinkevičius.
