= Lithuanian Trade Union Confederation =

LPSK
- Lithuanian Trade Union Confederation
- Lietuvos Profesinių Sąjungų Konfederacija
- Founded: May 1, 2002
- Headquarters: Vilnius, Lithuania
- Location: Lithuania
- Members: 124,000
- Key people: Dalia Jakutavičė (President)
- Affiliations: ITUC, ETUC
- Website: www.lpsk.lt

The Lithuanian Trade Union Confederation (LPSK) is a national trade union center in Lithuania. It was founded May 1, 2002 by the merger of the Lithuanian Trade Union Unification (LPSS) and the Lithuanian Trade Union Centre (LPSC).

The LPSK is affiliated with the International Trade Union Confederation and the European Trade Union Confederation.
