= Lukas Alsys =

Lithuanian politician (born 1995)

Minister of Culture
- Incumbent
- Assumed office 14 July 2026
- Prime Minister: Mindaugas Sinkevičius
- Preceded by: Vaida Aleknavičienė

Personal details
- Born: 8 January 1995 (age 31)
- Party: Social Democratic Party

Lukas Alsys (born 8 January 1995) is a Lithuanian politician serving as minister of culture since 2026. From 2025 to 2026, he served as chancellor of the Ministry of Culture.
