= MPH =

MPH or mph is miles per hour, a measure of speed.

MPH may also refer to:

== Arts, entertainment and media ==
- MPH (comics), a British comic book series (2014–2015)
- MPH Entertainment, Inc., an American production company (founded 1996)
- Metroid Prime Hunters, a 2006 video game
- Mobile Pedestrian Handheld, a 2008 LG proposal for mobile TV
- MPH, a superhero in the Astro City comics (since 1995)

== Businesses and organisations ==
- MPH Group, a Malaysian bookstore chain (founded 1890)
- MPH Entertainment, Inc., an American production company (founded 1996)
- Make Poverty History, a series of 2005 national campaign coalitions
- Martinair, a Dutch airline (ICAO:MPH; founded 1958)

== Medicine ==
- Master of Public Health, an academic degree
- Methylphenidate, a stimulant drug for ADHD

== Places ==
- Manlius Pebble Hill School, DeWitt, New York, United States
- Mater Private Hospital, Dublin, Ireland
- Godofredo P. Ramos Airport, Philippines (IATA:MPH)

== See also ==
- MPHS (disambiguation)
