= Ministry of Foreign Affairs (Lithuania) =

Government ministry of Lithuania

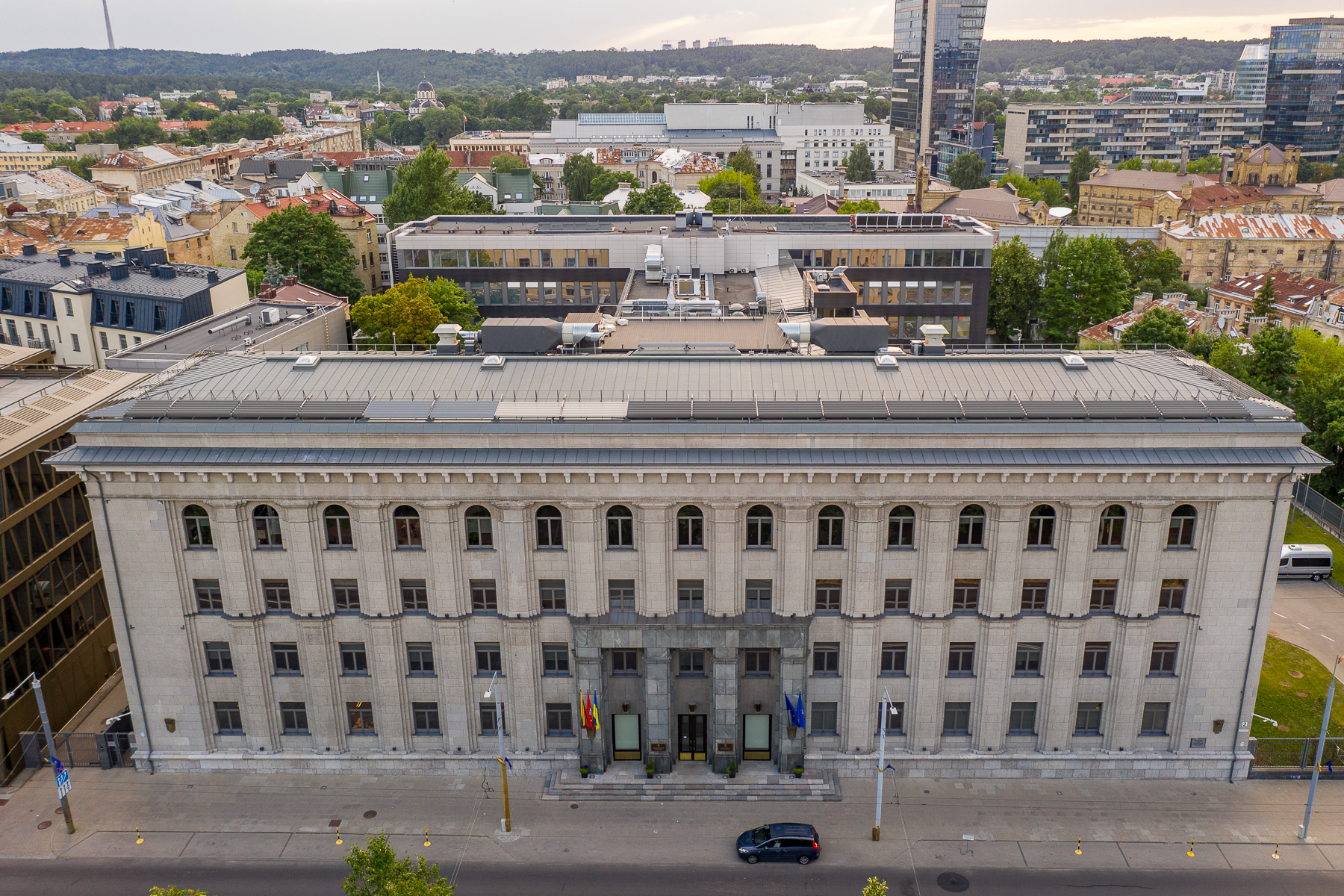

Ministry overview
- Formed: 11 November 1918; 108 years ago
- Jurisdiction: Government of Lithuania
- Headquarters: J. Tumo-Vaižganto 2, Naujamiestis, 01511 Vilnius
- Employees: 1,147 permanent employees (April 2025) and 1 cat
- Annual budget: ▲€115 million (2024)
- Minister responsible: Kęstutis Budrys, 20th Minister for Foreign Affairs of Lithuania
- Website: urm.lt

Map
- 54°41′25.8″N 25°16′11″E

The Ministry of Foreign Affairs of the Republic of Lithuania (Lithuanian: Lietuvos Respublikos užsienio reikalų ministerija) is a governmental body of the Republic of Lithuania that shapes the national policy, and organises, coordinates, and controls its enforcement in the following areas: foreign affairs and security policy: international relations, economic security, foreign trade, protection of the rights and interests of the Republic of Lithuania and its persons and entities abroad; coordination of European Union membership; representing the Republic of Lithuania abroad diplomatic and consular relations, diplomatic service, Lithuanian national and diplomatic protocol, international relations; the policy of cooperation of the Republic of Lithuania; strengthening of expat connections with Lithuania.

== History ==
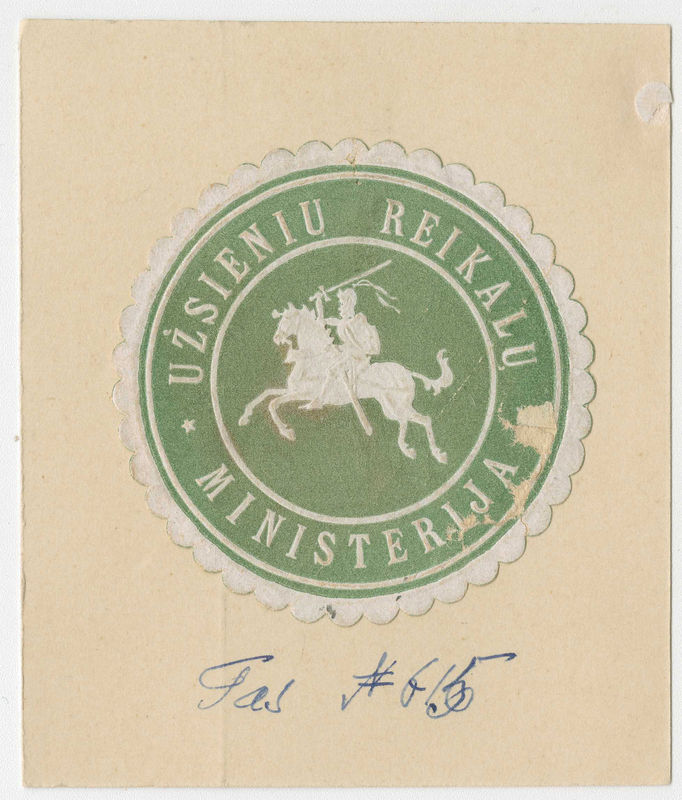
Seal of the interwar Republic ministry

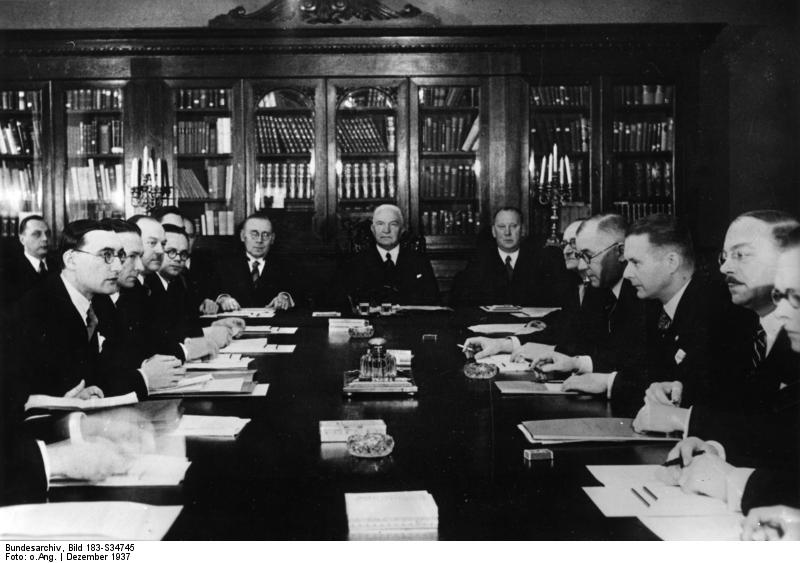
Meeting of the Foreign Ministers of the Baltic States. Tallinn, December 1937. Center: Estonian Minister Friedrich Akel. On the left: Lithuanian Minister Juozas Urbšys. Right: Latvian Minister Vilhelms Munters.

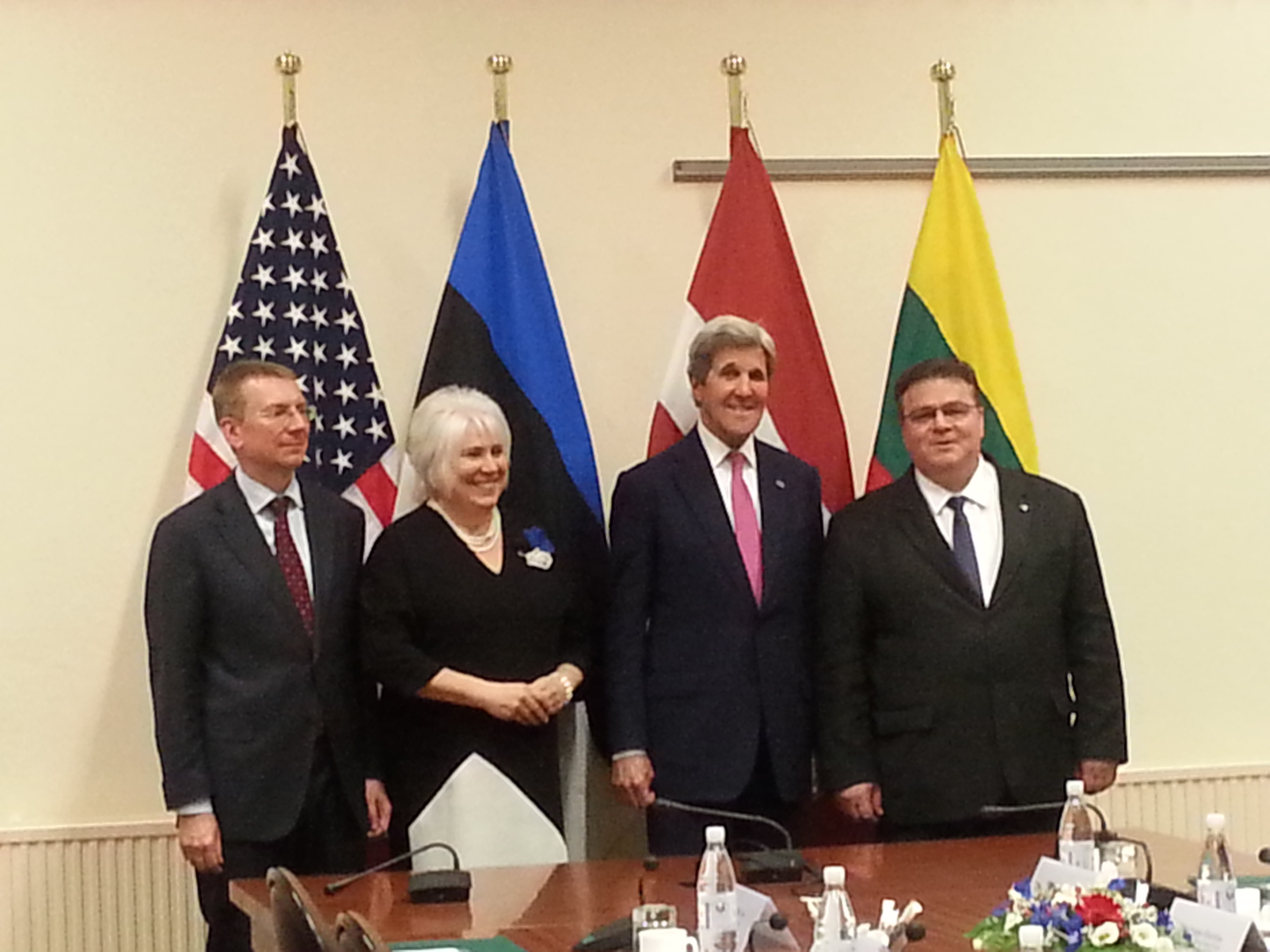
Ministers of the Baltic States – Edgars Rinkēvičs, Marina Kaljurand, Linas Linkevičius – meet the US Secretary of State John Kerry in 2016.

The first cabinet of ministers of the Republic of Lithuania was appointed on 11 November 1918 and the foreign affairs minister position was initially assumed by the Prime Minister Augustinas Voldemaras. Augustinas Voldemaras served as the Minister of Foreign Affairs in subsequent cabinets under different prime ministers until 19 June 1920, when he was replaced by Juozas Purickis.

== Activities ==
The head of the Ministry is the foreign minister. The current head of the Ministry is Kęstutis Budrys. He is appointed and revoked by the President of the Republic of Lithuania by motion from the Prime Minister. The foreign minister is subordinate to the Parliament, the President, and the Prime Minister of the Republic of Lithuania. The foreign minister supervises the Ministry, deals with matters that lay within its sphere of competence, signs international agreements, ensures the enforcement of regulations the Ministry is tasked to oversee, files bills, ensures the execution of orders from the Government and the Prime Minister of the Republic of Lithuania, approves Strategic Planning Methodology, issues annual reports, coordinates and controls the work of administrational departments of the Ministry, as well as the activities of diplomatic missions, consular establishments and offices of the Republic of Lithuania to international organizations, file motions to the President of the Republic of Lithuania to award the diplomatic ranks of ambassador extraordinary and plenipotentiary of the Republic of Lithuania, envoy extraordinary of the Republic of Lithuania, and minister plenipotentiary of the Republic of Lithuania, and to the Government of the Republic of Lithuania, to appoint or recall diplomatic representatives (ambassadors extraordinary and plenipotentiary), defines the areas of activity for vice-ministers, and areas of cooperation for the Ministry chancellor.

In his work, the minister is advised by officers of political trust – vice-ministers. The Ministry may not have more than four of them. They organise and control execution of orders, the drafting and approval of draft regulations, and represent the minister by assignment, presenting the minister's political attitudes and decisions to the public.

The analysis, planning, formation, coordination, and enforcement of Lithuania's foreign policy is done by the political director of the Foreign Ministry. The director's functions include high-level representation of Lithuania abroad. The political director is involved in the activities of the Ministry's management, cooperates with the Ministry's administrative departments, domestic and foreign institutions, bodies, and individual partners. The director also supervises the formation, enforcement, and development of the security policy and cooperation with foreign countries, regions, and international organizations, the strengthening of the Eastern neighborhood policy, human rights and democracy, European policy, trans-Atlantic and developmental cooperation, and support of democracy.

The head of the Ministry's administration is the chancellor. The chancellor coordinates and controls the activities of the Ministry's administrative departments, ensures that financial and intellectual resources, assets and information are used optimally to achieve the Ministry's strategic operating goals and objectives.

The foreign minister has an advisory institution, the so-called board. The ministry also has a cat named Rango, with his official title being "Official Cat of the Ministry of Foreign Affairs of the Republic of Lithuania".

== Ministers ==
Democratic Labour Party Homeland Union New Union Social Democratic Party Independent

Ministry of Foreign Affairs
Term	Minister	Party	Cabinet	Office		
Term	Minister	Party	Cabinet	Start date	End date	Time in office
1	Algirdas Saudargas (born 1948)	Homeland Union	Prunskienė	17 January 1990	10 January 1991	358 days
2	Algirdas Saudargas (born 1948)	Homeland Union	Šimėnas	10 January 1991	13 January 1991	3 days
3	Algirdas Saudargas (born 1948)	Homeland Union	Vagnorius	13 January 1991	21 July 1992	1 year, 190 days
4	Algirdas Saudargas (born 1948)	Homeland Union	Abišala	21 July 1992	17 December 1992	149 days
5	Povilas Gylys (born 1948)	Democratic Labour Party	Lubys	17 December 1992	31 March 1993	104 days
6	Povilas Gylys (born 1948)	Democratic Labour Party	Šleževičius	31 March 1993	19 March 1996	2 years, 354 days
7	Povilas Gylys (born 1948)	Democratic Labour Party	Stankevičius	19 March 1996	10 December 1996	266 days
8	Algirdas Saudargas (born 1948)	Homeland Union	Vagnorius	10 December 1996	10 June 1999	2 years, 182 days
9	Algirdas Saudargas (born 1948)	Homeland Union	Paksas	10 June 1999	11 November 1999	154 days
10	Algirdas Saudargas (born 1948)	Homeland Union	Kubilius	11 November 1999	9 November 2000	365 days
11	Antanas Valionis (born 1950)	New Union	Paksas	9 November 2000	12 July 2001	245 days
12	Antanas Valionis (born 1950)	New Union	Brazauskas	12 July 2001	14 December 2004	3 years, 155 days
13	Antanas Valionis (born 1950)	New Union	Brazauskas	14 December 2004	18 July 2006	1 year, 216 days
14	Petras Vaitiekūnas (born 1953)	Independent	Kirkilas	18 July 2006	9 December 2008	2 years, 144 days
15	Vygaudas Ušackas (born 1962)	Independent	Kubilius	9 December 2008	26 January 2010	1 year, 48 days
16	Audronius Ažubalis (born 1958)	Homeland Union	Kubilius	29 January 2010	13 December 2012	2 years, 319 days
17	Linas Antanas Linkevičius (born 1961)	Social Democratic Party	Butkevičius	13 December 2012	13 December 2016	4 years, 0 days
18	Linas Antanas Linkevičius (born 1961)	Social Democratic Party	Skvernelis	13 December 2016	11 December 2020	3 years, 364 days
18	Linas Antanas Linkevičius (born 1961)	Independent	Skvernelis	13 December 2016	11 December 2020	3 years, 364 days
19	Gabrielius Landsbergis (born 1982)	Homeland Union	Šimonytė	11 December 2020	12 December 2024	4 years, 1 day
20	Kęstutis Budrys (born 1980)	Independent	Paluckas; Ruginienė Sinkevičius	12 December 2024	Incumbent	1 year, 343 days

== Sources ==
- Lietuvos Respublikos Užsienio reikalų ministrai 1918-1940. Retrieved on 2008-08-10
- Lietuvos Respublikos Užsienio reikalų ministrai 1990 - 2006. Retrieved on 2008-08-10
