= Robertas Kaunas =

Lithuanian politician (born 1985)

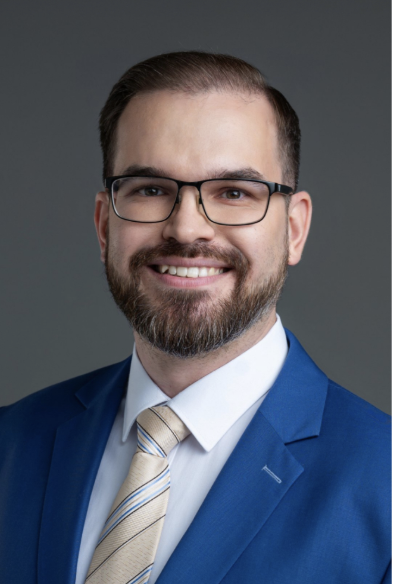
- Official portrait, 2024

Minister of National Defence
- Incumbent
- Assumed office 11 November 2025
- Prime Minister: Inga Ruginienė; Mindaugas Sinkevičius
- Preceded by: Dovilė Šakalienė

Member of the Seimas
- Incumbent
- Assumed office 14 November 2024
- Preceded by: Vytautas Juozapaitis
- Constituency: Aleksotas–Vilijampolė

Personal details
- Born: 7 January 1985 (age 41) Kaunas, Lithuanian SSR
- Party: Social Democratic Party
- Education: Kaunas University of Technology
- Occupation: Engineer · Politician

Robertas Kaunas (born 7 January 1985) is a Lithuanian politician of the Social Democratic Party who is the Minister of National Defence since 11 November 2025. He was elected member of the Seimas in the 2024 parliamentary election. He previously served as a city councillor of Kaunas.

== Controversies ==
In 2025, it emerged that Robertas Kaunas had been banned from a Lithuanian online forum in 2012 for engaging in financial fraud.
