= Kęstutis Budrys =

Lithuanian politician (born 1980)

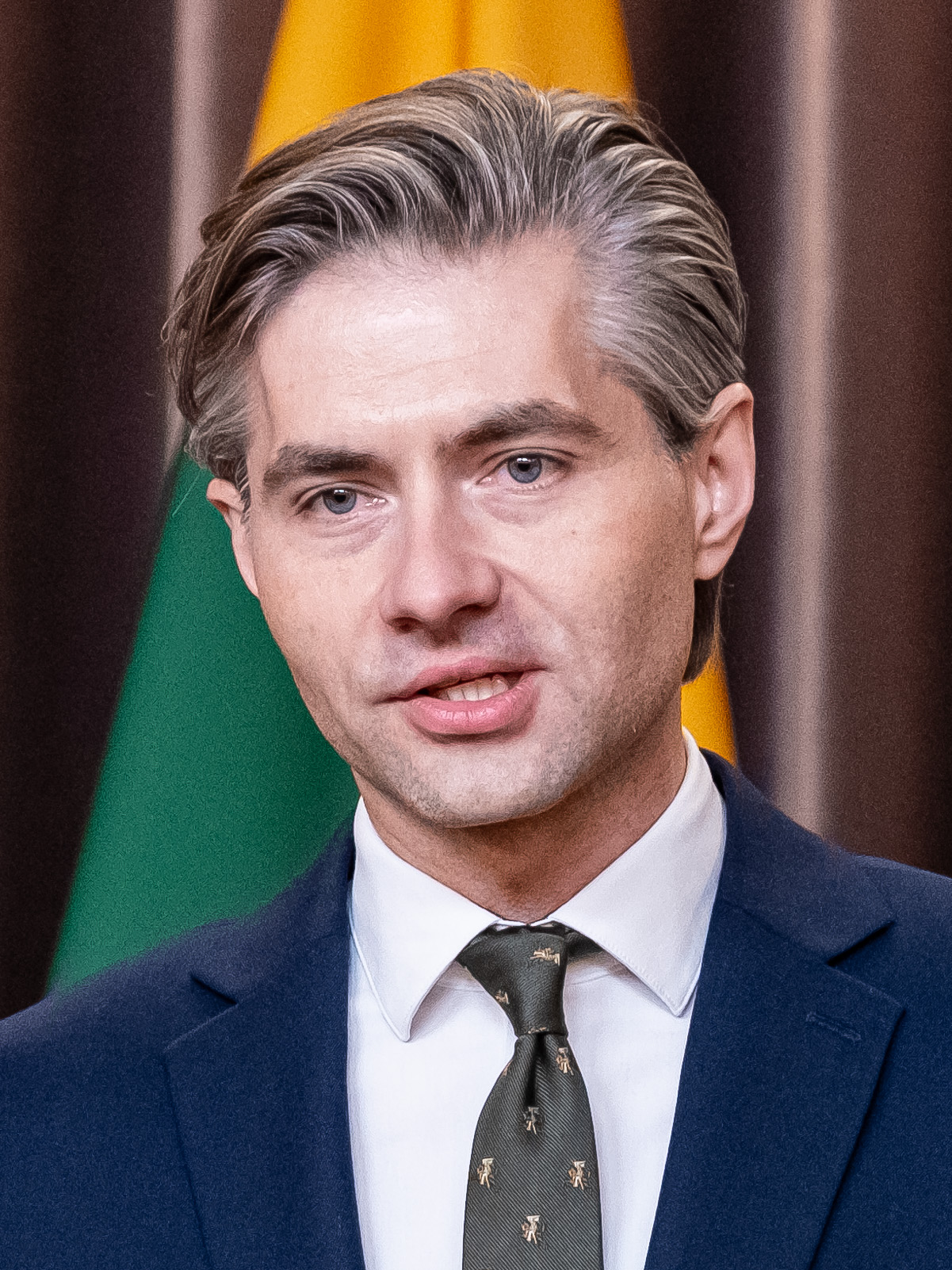
- Budrys in 2025

Minister of Foreign Affairs
- Incumbent
- Assumed office 12 December 2024
- Prime Minister: Gintautas Paluckas; Rimantas Šadžius (acting); Inga Ruginienė; Mindaugas Sinkevičius
- Preceded by: Gabrielius Landsbergis

Personal details
- Born: 2 October 1980 (age 45) Vilnius, Lithuania
- Party: Independent
- Education: Vilnius University Institute of International Relations and Political Science (MA)

Kęstutis Budrys (born 2 October 1980) is a Lithuanian politician and security expert who has been serving as the Minister of Foreign Affairs since 12 December 2024. He was nominated for the position in November 2024 by Prime Minister Gintautas Paluckas.

== Early life and education ==
Kęstutis Budrys was born in Vilnius, Lithuania. He graduated from the Vilnius University Institute of International Relations and Political Science in 2004 with a master's degree in political science.

== Career ==
=== State Security Department ===
Budrys began working at the State Security Department of Lithuania in 2002 as an inspector. Over time, he held various positions, including senior inspector, head of department, and deputy head of the board.

In 2015, he was appointed deputy director of the State Security Department and was re-appointed for an additional five-year term in 2020.

=== Presidential Advisor ===
From 2009 to 2020, Budrys served as an advisor to the President of Lithuania, specializing in intelligence and defense policy. In 2014, he was temporarily appointed as chief national security advisor to the president following the resignation of Jonas Markevičius.

In 2022, Budrys was appointed chief national security advisor to the president.

=== Minister of Foreign Affairs ===
Budrys assumed office as the Minister of Foreign Affairs on 12 December 2024, succeeding Gabrielius Landsbergis. His tenure focuses on enhancing Lithuania's diplomatic presence and addressing global security challenges.

== Awards ==
- Order of Merit 2 class (Ukraine, 2026)
