= Raminta Popovienė =

Lithuanian politician (born 1970)

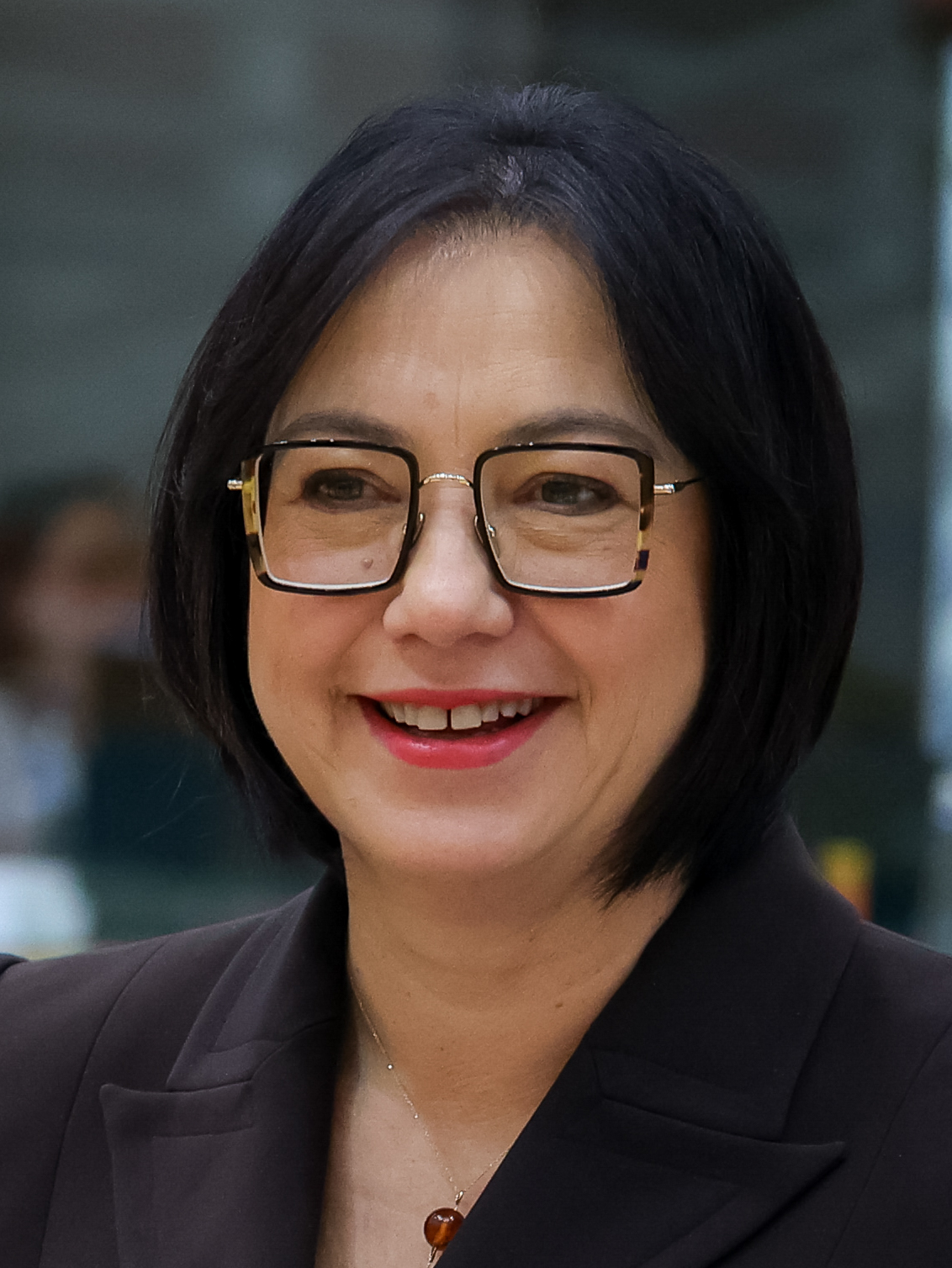
- Popovienė in 2025

Minister of Education, Science and Sports
- Incumbent
- Assumed office 12 December 2024
- Prime Minister: Gintautas Paluckas; Rimantas Šadžius (acting); Inga Ruginienė; Mindaugas Sinkevičius
- Preceded by: Gintarė Skaistė

Acting Minister of Culture
- In office 3 October 2025 – 11 November 2025
- Prime Minister: Inga Ruginienė
- Preceded by: Ignotas Adomavičius
- Succeeded by: Vaida Aleknavičienė

Personal details
- Born: 5 May 1970 (age 56) Zarasai, Lithuanian SSR, Soviet Union
- Party: Social Democratic Party of Lithuania
- Education: Lithuanian Academy of Music and Theatre
- Occupation: Music educator, politician

Raminta Popovienė (born 5 May 1970 Zarasai) is a Lithuanian music educator and a politician from the Social Democratic Party of Lithuania. She has served as Minister of Education, Science and Sports since 2024. She has been a member of Seimas since 2012.

== Early life ==
Born in Zarasai on 5 May 1970, Raminta Popovienė did her schooling at the Ąžuolas Gymnasium. She received her music teacher and choir conductor diploma from the Lithuanian Academy of Music and Theatre (1988–94) and also holds a master's degree in music education.

== Career ==
After completing her master's degree, Popovienė became a senior supervisor at the Lithuanian Academy of Music. From 2000 to 2007, she was a chief specialist at the Kaunas District Municipality's Department of Culture, Education and Sports. In 2007 she was appointed the Kaunas District Social Services Centre's director and was promoted to the post of deputy director of Administration of Kaunas District Municipality in 2011.

A member of the Social Democratic Party of Lithuania, Popovienė won the 2012 Lithuanian parliamentary election and served on the house committees for Social Affairs and Labour, Youth and Sport Affairs and was a member of the Lithuanian delegation that visited the Polish parliament. She was re-elected in 2016 and in her second term serves on the Commission for Suicide and Violence Prevention and Migration Commission besides being the deputy chair of the Committee on Culture.

Seimas
Preceded by Justinas Urbanavičius	Member of the Seimas for Kaunas and Kėdainiai; 2012–2016	Succeeded by Viktoras Pranckietis (Raudondvaris); Darius Kaminskas (Kėdainiai)
