= Dovilė Šakalienė =

Lithuanian politician

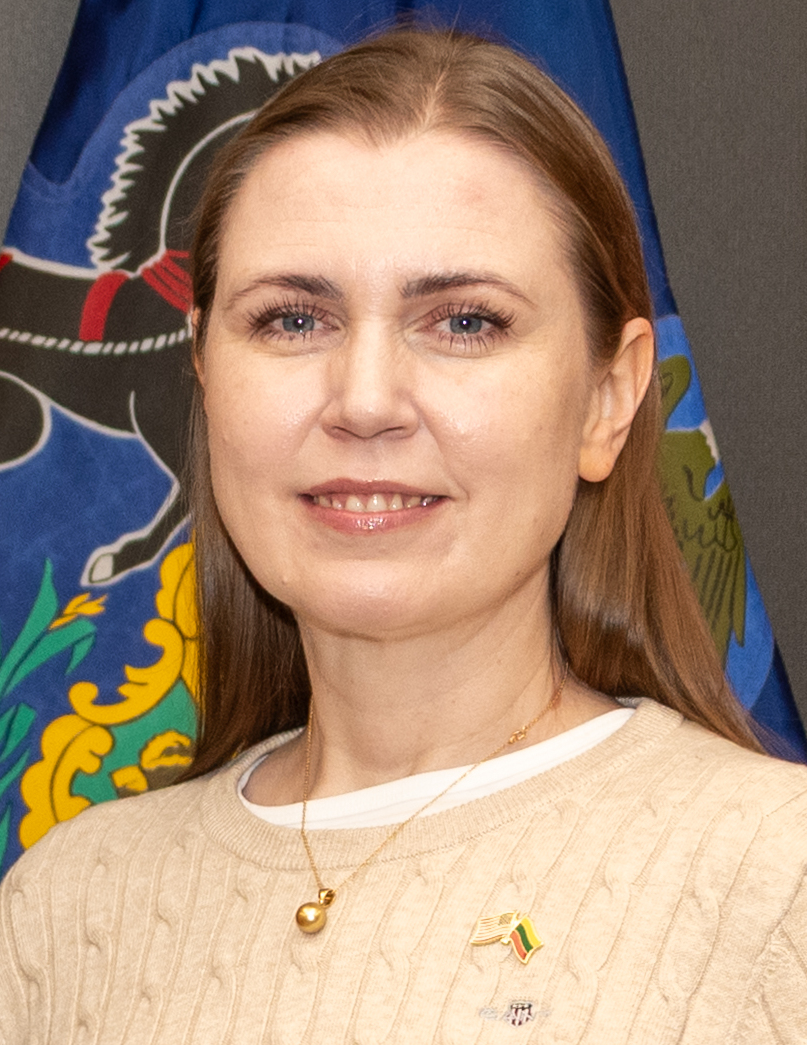
- Šakalienė in 2025

Minister of National Defence
- In office 12 December 2024 – 22 October 2025; Suspended: 20–22 October 2025
- Prime Minister: Gintautas Paluckas; Rimantas Šadžius (acting); Inga Ruginienė
- Preceded by: Laurynas Kasčiūnas
- Succeeded by: Vladislav Kondratovič (acting)

Member of the Seimas
- Incumbent
- Assumed office 14 November 2016
- Constituency: Multi-member

Personal details
- Born: 1 June 1978 (age 48) Kaunas, Lithuanian SSR, Soviet Union
- Party: LSDP (2017–present)
- Other political affiliations: LVŽS (2016–2017); LS (2017)
- Spouse: Valdas (m. 1998)
- Education: Vilnius University; Mykolas Romeris University

Dovilė Šakalienė (born 1 June 1978) is a Lithuanian politician who served as the Minister of National Defence from 12 December 2024 until 22 October 2025. She has been a member of the Seimas since 2016 and previously worked as a psychologist and human rights defender.

== Biography ==
Šakalienė completed high school in Panevėžys in 1996 and earned a bachelor's degree in psychology from Vilnius University in 2001. She later received a degree in legal psychology from Mykolas Romeris University in 2003. From 2004 to 2016, she worked at the Lithuanian Human Rights Monitoring Institute, where she criticized legislative proposals restricting LGBT rights and abortion rights.

From 2011 to 2015, she hosted the Žinių radijas program "Žmogus žmogui" and served as an accredited journalist at the Council of Europe from 2012 to 2016.

== Political career ==
Šakalienė entered politics as an independent candidate on the Lithuanian Farmers and Greens Union list in the 2016 Lithuanian parliamentary election. She left the party's parliamentary group in 2017, citing differences over child protection laws, and joined the Social Democratic Party of Lithuania.

During her time in the Seimas, Šakalienė introduced amendments to the Law on the Framework of the Protection of the Rights of the Child, banning corporal punishment and redefining child abuse to include psychological abuse and neglect.

On 22 March 2021, she was sanctioned by the Chinese government after the European Union imposed sanctions on China over Xinjiang.

Following the Russian invasion of Ukraine in 2022, Šakalienė housed a Ukrainian refugee family and advocated for stronger European defense policies.

=== Position on Ukraine ===
In June 2025, Šakalienė affirmed that Lithuania "will never give up" on Ukraine's aspiration to join NATO, emphasizing that decisions on membership should rest with the Alliance itself—not with external actors. She warned of a dangerous "new axis" composed of Russia, China, North Korea, and Iran, and called for NATO to speak clearly against attempts to undermine its credibility.

=== Minister of National Defence ===
After the 2024 Lithuanian parliamentary election, Šakalienė was nominated by Prime Minister Gintautas Paluckas as Minister of National Defence. She assumed office on 12 December 2024, succeeding Laurynas Kasčiūnas.

She was suspended as defense minister on 20 October 2025 for a scandal involving influencers. She resigned on 22 October 2025 amid a dispute with prime minister Inga Ruginienė over defence spending.

== Awards and honors ==
- Taiwan: Friendship Medal of Diplomacy (2026)
