= Ministry of Economy and Innovation (Lithuania) =

Government ministry of Lithuania

- Ekonomikos ir inovacijų ministerija (in Lithuanian)
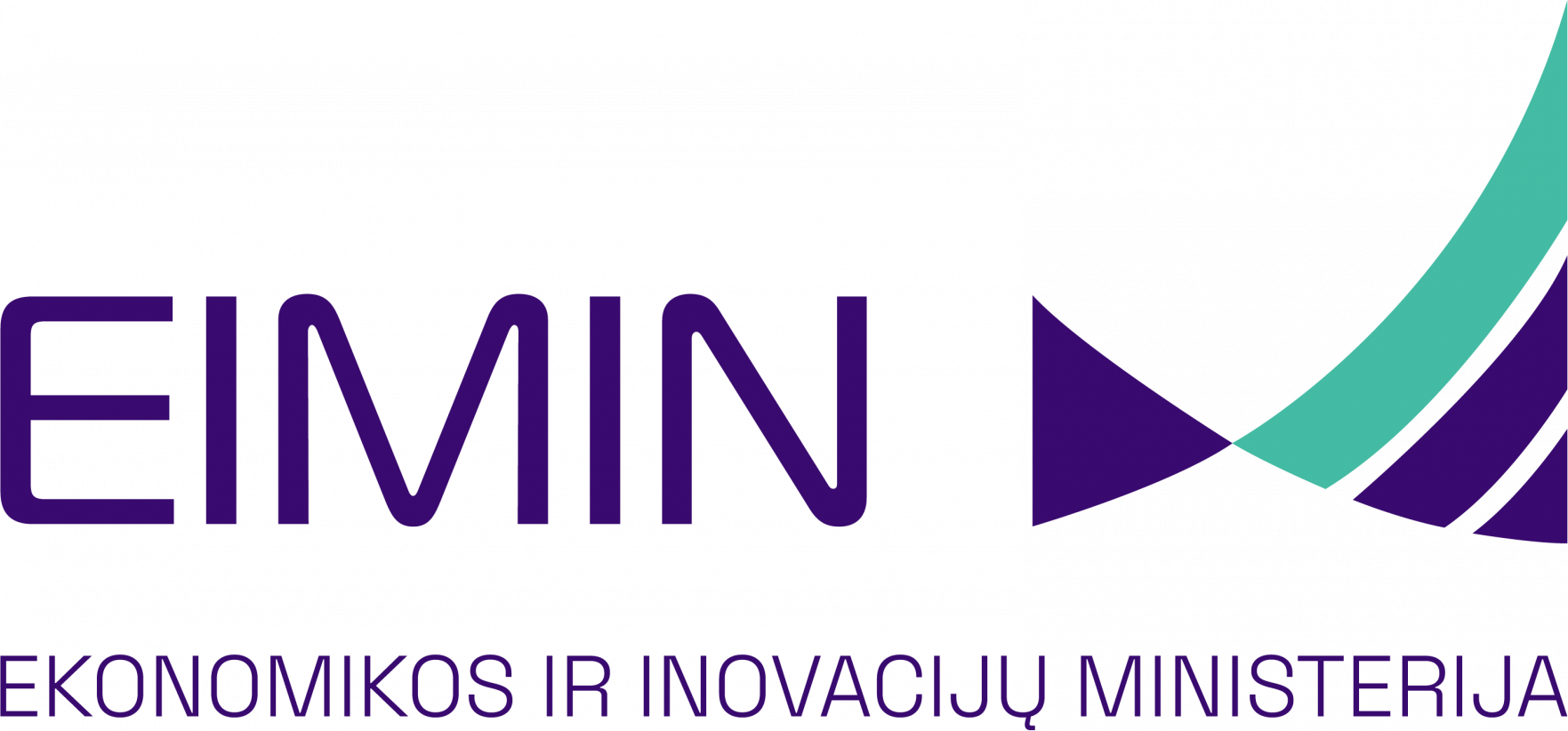

- Ministry of Economy and Innovation

Ministry overview
- Formed: 17 January 1990; 36 years ago
- Jurisdiction: Government of Lithuania
- Headquarters: Gedimino 38, Naujamiestis, 01104 Vilnius
- Employees: 244 permanent employees (January 2021)
- Annual budget: ▼€468 million (2024)
- Minister responsible: Lukas Savickas, 28th Minister for Economy and Innovation of Lithuania
- Website: eimin.lrv.lt

Map
- 54°41′16.1″N 25°16′29.3″E

The Ministry of Economy and Innovation of the Republic of Lithuania (Lithuanian: Lietuvos Respublikos ekonomikos ir inovacijų ministerija) is a government department of the Republic of Lithuania. Its operations are authorized by the Constitution of the Republic of Lithuania, decrees issued by the president and prime minister, and laws passed by the Seimas (Parliament). Its mission is to develop positive legal and economic environment for economic development and ensure public welfare and employment.

The Ministry of Economy and Innovation is responsible for handling government business in the following areas: business environment, export, innovation, state-owned enterprises (SOEs), EU support to business, public procurement and tourism.

== History ==
On 11 November 1918, the Republic of Lithuania established the Ministry of Finance, Trading and Industry. It is considered to be the predecessor of the Ministry of Economy, although throughout the interwar period it was never a separate ministry and its functions remained under the Ministry of Finance. A separate Ministry of Economy was established on 17 January 1990. Its areas of responsibility and the name changed several times in 1990s. On 1 January 2019, it was renamed to the Ministry of Economy and Innovation.

== Institutions ==
- Central Procurement Organisation (Centrinė perkančioji organizacija)
- Create Lithuania (Kurk Lietuvai)
- Governance Coordination Centre (Valdymo koordinavimo centras)
- Invest Lithuania (Investuok Lietuvoje)
- INVEGA (Investicijų ir verslo garantijos)
- Klaipėda Science and Technology Park (Klaipėdos mokslo ir technologijų parkas)
- LITEXPO (Lietuvos parodų ir kongresų centras LITEXPO)
- Lithuania Travel (Keliauk Lietuvoje)
- Lithuanian Business Support Agency (Lietuvos verslo paramos agentūra)
- Lithuanian Innovation Center (Lietuvos inovacijų centras)
- Lithuanian Metrology Inspectorate (Lietuvos metrologijos inspekcija)
- Lithuanian National Accreditation Bureau (Nacionalinis akreditacijos biuras)
- Lithuanian Standards Board (Lietuvos standartizacijos departamentas)
- SOLVIT (SOLVIT)
- State Enterprise Centre of Registers (Registrų centras)
- Projektų ekspertizė (Lithuanian language only)
- TechPark Kaunas
- Toksika (Lithuanian language only)

== Ministers ==
Christian Democratic Party Democratic Labour Party Farmers and Greens Union Freedom Party Homeland Union Labour Party Liberal Union Popular Peasant's Union Social Democratic Labour Party Social Democratic Party Independent

Ministry of Economy
Term	Minister	Party	Cabinet	Office		
Term	Minister	Party	Cabinet	Start date	End date	Time in office
1	Vytas Navickas (born 1952)	Popular Peasant's Union	Prunskienė	17 January 1990	10 January 1991	358 days
2	Vytas Navickas (born 1952)	Popular Peasant's Union	Šimėnas	10 January 1991	13 January 1991	3 days
3	Vytas Navickas (born 1952)	Popular Peasant's Union	Vagnorius	13 January 1991	30 May 1991	137 days
4	Albertas Šimėnas (born 1950)	Christian Democratic Party	Vagnorius	30 May 1991	21 July 1992	1 year, 52 days
5	Vytas Navickas (born 1952)	Popular Peasant's Union	Abišala	21 July 1992	17 December 1992	149 days
6	Julius Veselka (1943-2012)	Democratic Labour Party	Lubys	17 December 1992	31 March 1993	104 days
7	Julius Veselka (1943-2012)	Democratic Labour Party	Šleževičius	31 March 1993	9 June 1994	1 year, 70 days
8	Aleksandras Vasiliauskas (1940-2016)	Democratic Labour Party	Šleževičius	9 June 1994	5 October 1995	1 year, 118 days
9	Vytas Navickas (born 1952)	Independent	Šleževičius	5 October 1995	19 March 1996	166 days
10	Antanas Kaminskas (born 1953)	Democratic Labour Party	Stankevičius	19 March 1996	10 December 1996	266 days
11	Vincas Babilius (1937-2003)	Homeland Union	Vagnorius	10 December 1996	10 June 1999	2 years, 182 days
12	Eugenijus Maldeikis (born 1958)	Independent	Paksas	10 June 1999	11 November 1999	154 days
13	Valentinas Milaknis (born 1947)	Independent	Kubilius	11 November 1999	9 November 2000	364 days
14	Eugenijus Maldeikis (born 1958)	Liberal Union	Paksas	9 November 2000	14 February 2001	97 days
15	Eugenijus Gentvilas (born 1960)	Liberal Union	Paksas	15 February 2001	12 July 2001	147 days
16	Petras Čėsna (born 1945)	Social Democratic Party	Brazauskas	12 July 2001	14 December 2004	3 years, 155 days
17	Viktoras Uspaskich (born 1959)	Labour Party	Brazauskas	14 December 2004	21 June 2005	189 days
18	Kęstutis Daukšys (born 1960)	Labour Party	Brazauskas	29 June 2005	18 July 2006	1 year, 19 days
19	Vytas Navickas (born 1952)	Independent	Kirkilas	18 July 2006	9 December 2008	2 years, 144 days
20	Dainius Kreivys (born 1970)	Homeland Union	Kubilius	9 December 2008	17 March 2011	2 years, 98 days
21	Rimantas Žylius (born 1973)	Homeland Union	Kubilius	17 March 2011	13 December 2012	1 year, 271 days
22	Birutė Vėsaitė (born 1951)	Social Democratic Party	Butkevičius	13 December 2012	3 June 2013	172 days
23	Evaldas Gustas (born 1959)	Social Democratic Party	Butkevičius	11 June 2013	13 December 2016	3 years, 185 days
Ministry of Economy and Innovation
Term	Minister	Party	Cabinet	Office		
Term	Minister	Party	Cabinet	Start date	End date	Time in office
24	Mindaugas Sinkevičius (born 1984)	Social Democratic Party	Skvernelis	13 December 2016	13 October 2017	304 days
25	Virginijus Sinkevičius (born 1990)	Farmers and Greens Union	Skvernelis	28 November 2017	30 November 2019	2 years, 2 days
26	Rimantas Sinkevičius (born 1952)	Social Democratic Labour Party	Skvernelis	30 June 2020	11 December 2020	164 days
27	Aušrinė Armonaitė (born 1989)	Freedom Party	Šimonytė	11 December 2020	Incumbent	5 years, 240 days
