= Lukas Savickas =

Lithuanian politician (born 1990)

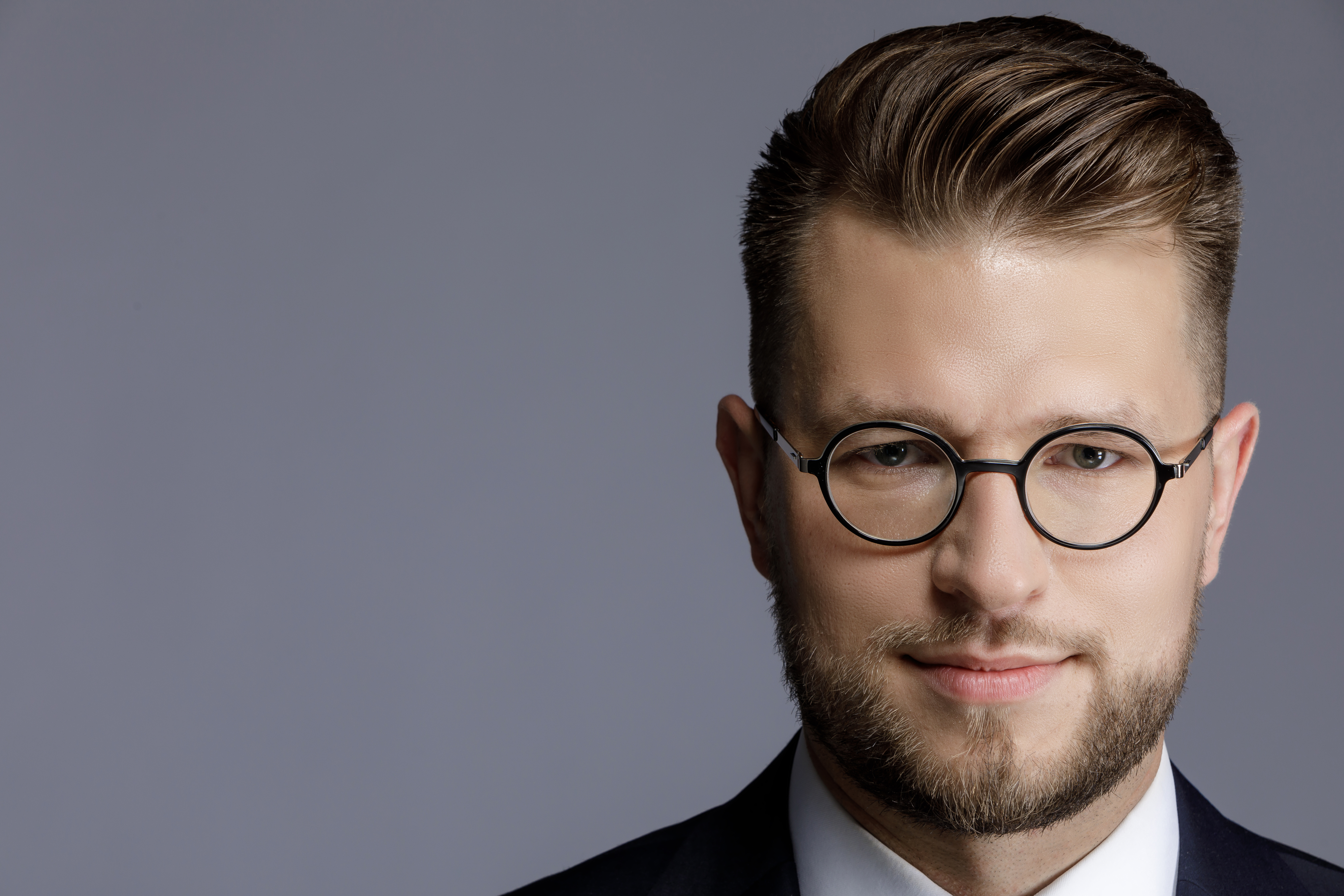

Minister of Energy
- Incumbent
- Assumed office 14 July 2026
- Prime Minister: Mindaugas Sinkevičius
- Preceded by: Žygimantas Vaičiūnas

Member of the Seimas
- Incumbent
- Assumed office 14 November 2024
- Constituency: Multi-member

Personal details
- Born: 12 April 1990 (age 36) Vilnius, Lithuania
- Party: Union of Democrats "For Lithuania"
- Spouse: Daiva Savickienė
- Education: University of York (BA), Maastricht University (MA)

Lukas Savickas (born 12 April 1990) is a Lithuanian politician currently serving as the Minister of Energy since July 2026. A member of the Union of Democrats "For Lithuania", he has also been a Member of the Seimas since November 2024 and previously served as an adviser to the Prime Minister of Lithuania.

== Early life and education ==
Savickas was born in Vilnius, Lithuania. He graduated from the University of York in 2011 with a Bachelor of Arts in Politics and International Relations. He later obtained a master's degree in European Public Affairs from Maastricht University in 2012.

== Early career ==
After completing his studies, Savickas interned at the Permanent Representation of Lithuania to the European Union in 2012. He participated in "Create for Lithuania," a program aimed at attracting young professionals to the public sector. Additionally, he led the Investment Environment Improvement Group at "Invest Lithuania," working to enhance the country's appeal to foreign investors.

== Political career ==
=== Adviser to the Prime Minister ===
From 2016 to 2020, Savickas served as an adviser to Prime Minister Saulius Skvernelis. He focused on economic strategy and public administration reforms. Later, he became the First Deputy Chancellor of the Government, coordinating initiatives to improve Lithuania's competitiveness and investment environment.

=== Member of the Seimas ===
In the 2020 parliamentary elections, Savickas was elected to the Seimas, representing the Lithuanian Farmers and Greens Union. He served on the Committee on Economics and as Deputy Chair of the Committee for the Future. In 2022, he joined the Union of Democrats "For Lithuania" and was re-elected in 2024.

=== Minister of Economy and Innovation ===
Savickas assumed the role of Minister of Economy and Innovation in December 2024 under Prime Minister Gintautas Paluckas. His priorities include fostering a green and digital economy, supporting small businesses, and strengthening international trade relations.

On 10 June 2025, as Minister of Economy and Innovation, Savickas officially inaugurated a laser processing applications laboratory in Silicon Valley, California, established by the Lithuanian company Light Conversion. This initiative aims to support advanced semiconductor, electronics, and medical device industries by enabling real‑world testing of laser systems and accelerating their integration into manufacturing workflows.

== Personal life ==
Savickas is married to Daiva Savickienė, and they have two daughters, Adelė and Smiltė. He is fluent in English and French and is known for his commitment to evidence-based policymaking and strategic change management.

== Awards and recognition ==
Savickas is a fellow of the Atlantic Council Millennium Leadership Program, reflecting his commitment to leadership and public service.
