= Inga Ruginienė =

Prime Minister of Lithuania from 2025 to 2026

Inga Ruginienė MP
- Ruginienė in 2026

19th Prime Minister of Lithuania
- In office 25 September 2025 – 14 July 2026
- President: Gitanas Nausėda
- Preceded by: Gintautas Paluckas
- Succeeded by: Mindaugas Sinkevičius

Minister of Social Security and Labour
- Incumbent
- Assumed office 14 July 2026
- Prime Minister: Mindaugas Sinkevičius
- Preceded by: Jūratė Zailskienė
- In office 12 December 2024 – 25 September 2025
- Prime Minister: Gintautas Paluckas; Rimantas Šadžius (acting)
- Preceded by: Vytautas Šilinskas
- Succeeded by: Jūratė Zailskienė

Member of the Seimas
- Incumbent
- Assumed office 14 November 2024
- Constituency: Multi-member

President of the Lithuanian Trade Union Confederation
- In office 4 May 2018 – 13 November 2024
- Preceded by: Artūras Černiauskas
- Succeeded by: Audrius Gelžinis (acting)

Personal details
- Born: Inga Raitelaitytė; 24 May 1981 (age 45) Trakai, then part of Lithuanian SSR, Soviet Union
- Party: LSDP (since 2024)
- Spouse: Vismantas Ruginis
- Children: 2
- Education: Kaunas Forestry and Environmental Engineering College (B.Sc); Mykolas Romeris University (LL.M); Vilnius University (MPH)

Inga Ruginienė (née Raitelaitytė; born 24 May 1981) is a Lithuanian trade unionist and politician serving as Minister of Social Security and Labour since 2026. Previously she served as the 19th Prime Minister of Lithuania from 25 September 2025 until 14 July 2026. A member of the Social Democratic Party of Lithuania, she has been a Member of the Seimas since 2024.

In 2024, Ruginienė joined the LSDP to participate in the parliamentary elections held that year. She was elected to the Seimas in November 2024 and the following month became the Minister of Social Security and Labour in the new LSDP government under Prime Minister Gintautas Paluckas. On 4 August 2025, Paluckas resigned as prime minister following financial scandals and the LSDP nominated Ruginienė for prime minister two days later. Her nomination was subsequently confirmed by the Seimas on 26 August.

In June 2026, the LSDP announced the collapse of its coalition with the populist Dawn of Nemunas party following growing disagreements over security policy and internal coalition tensions. Following the coalition breakdown, uncertainty emerged regarding whether Ruginienė would remain prime minister, as negotiations over the formation of a new governing coalition and cabinet began. She was succeeded by Mindaugas Sinkevičius in July 2026.

== Early life and education ==
Inga Ruginienė was born in Trakai on 24 May 1981. She grew up in Grigiškės, but spent summers during her childhood in the eastern Ukrainian city of Kramatorsk. Her maternal grandmother lived in Ukraine, while her grandfather was deported to Siberia following World War II. Her grandparents subsequently met in Siberia.

In 1999, she graduated from Šviesa Gymnasium in Grigiškės. In 2005, Ruginienė earned a master's degree in public health from Vilnius University.

== Career ==
Ruginienė worked as a public health specialist at the State Environmental Health Center from 2005 to 2008. Ruginienė worked as Vilnius region director for the company "S Stata" from 2008 to 2010.

Ruginienė served as vice chair of the Lithuanian Federation of Forest and Wood Workers' Trade Unions from 2012 to 2014, and as chair from 2014 to 2018. In 2015, Ruginienė earned a bachelor's degree in forest management from the Kaunas Forestry and Environmental Engineering College.

She also served as chair of the Lithuanian Trade Union Confederation from 2018 to 2024. In 2022, she earned a master's in labor law from Mykolas Romeris University. She served as vice president of the European Trade Union Confederation from 2023 to 2024.

Ruginienė entered electoral politics when she ran in the 2024 Lithuanian parliamentary election. Her name appeared on the Lithuanian Social Democratic Party (LSDP) candidate list, though she was not an official member of any party at the time of the election. Despite finishing in sixth place in the Naujininkai–Rasos single-seat constituency, she secured a seat in the multi-mandate district of the Seimas due to her position in the party list. She became an official member of the LSDP in November 2024, after the election.

Following the Social Democrats' victory in the parliamentary election, Ruginienė became the Minister of Social Security and Labour. She served in the Paluckas Cabinet from 12 December 2024 until its dissolution on 4 August 2025. After its dissolution, she served as acting minister.

Within the Seimas, Ruginienė served on the parliamentary committee on human rights. She has also served as vice chair of the parliamentary group on forest conservation and as a member of the "against mass immigration", "friends of Neringa", and women's parliamentary groups.

On 6 August 2025, the Lithuanian Social Democratic Party nominated Ruginienė for Prime Minister. The nomination was approved on 26 August. On 25 September 2025, the parliament voted 80–42 to approve a coalition government led by the Social Democratic Party, swearing her in as the new prime minister.

== Political positions ==
According to journalist Stasys Gudavičius, Ruginienė represents "left–social democratic" political positions.

=== Social issues ===
Ruginienė supports same-sex unions and stated on 7 August that she would renew discussions on enshrining same-sex unions into law. She supports the proposed Reproductive Health Law, which would make abortions free of charge and legalise medical abortions.

=== Economics ===
Ruginienė supports the buy-out of private shares in the energy holding company Ignitis. Describing her views on economics, she stated that "it's no secret that I represent left-wing politics, and I believe that the public sector should be strengthened and be more in the hands of the state." She also indicated that her cabinet might increase certain tax rates, especially the excise tax for alcohol and tobacco products.

=== Defense ===
Ruginienė has stated that she considers national security a priority. She has indicated that she would maintain the Paluckas Government's plan to increase defense spending to 5–6% of GDP.

She has stated that it might be necessary for Lithuania to introduce universal military conscription.

=== Foreign policy ===
Ruginienė has expressed strong support for Ukraine in the context of the Russo-Ukrainian War. In August 2025, she stated that she had no clear position as to whether Lithuania should send troops to Ukraine as part of a potential peacekeeping force.

Ruginienė has called China a threat but has emphasised that Lithuania's policy should align with the European Union's common position on the country. China downgraded its relations with Lithuania following the 2021 establishment of a Taiwanese Representative Office in Vilnius which used the name "Taiwan" instead of "Taipei". Ruginienė has stated that she aims to normalise diplomatic relations with Beijing, but not to pursue "friendly relations".

=== Immigration ===
Ruginienė is a member of the parliamentary group "against mass immigration".

In January 2025, Ruginienė was interviewed about immigration on the TV station LRT televizija. She argued that migration should be more tightly controlled for security reasons, that Lithuania should focus on attracting skilled workers who will stay and contribute to the tax base, and that integration should be a priority.

== Prime Minister of Lithuania (2025–2026) ==
Inga Ruginienė was nominated for the office of Prime Minister by President Gitanas Nausėda in early August 2025 following the resignation of her predecessor, Gintautas Paluckas. On 26 August 2025, the Seimas approved her appointment by a vote of 78 in favor, 35 against, and 14 abstentions. Subsequently, President Nausėda issued the formal decree confirming her as Prime Minister, and on 25 September 2025 she and her Cabinet took the oath of office before Parliament, marking the beginning of her term.

Her cabinet was formed by a coalition of the Social Democratic Party, Dawn of Nemunas, Farmers and Greens Union and Electoral Action of Poles. In June 2026, the Lithuanian Social Democratic Party announced the collapse of its coalition with the populist Dawn of Nemunas party following growing disagreements over security policy, political rhetoric, and internal coalition tensions. The decision marked a major political challenge for Prime Minister Inga Ruginienė’s government and prompted discussions regarding the formation of a new parliamentary majority. Following the breakdown of the coalition, the Social Democrats began consultations with other political parties concerning possible cooperation in government.

On 23 June 2026, Ruginienė and her cabinet resigned following the formation of a new governing coalition after the Social Democratic Party ended its coalition agreement with Dawn of Nemunas. President Gitanas Nausėda asked the outgoing government to continue serving in a caretaker capacity until a new government is formed. She was succeeded by Social Democratic Party leader Mindaugas Sinkevičius on July 14, 2026, with Dawn of Nemunas being replaced by Union of Democrats "For Lithuania" as a coalition partner. Ruginienė assumed her former office of Minister of Social Security and Labour in the Sinkevičius cabinet.

=== Domestic Policy ===
==== Lithuanian Airspace Security Breach ====
Following the incident that happened on 22 October 2025, when a large group of contraband meteorological balloons was launched from Belarus into Lithuanian territory, the National Security Commission (NSC) was convened on the instruction of Prime Minister Inga Ruginienė. During the meeting, threats and risks to civil aviation safety and the protection of the state border were assessed, and decisions were taken on further measures to curb smuggling activities by air.

The meeting also discussed technological solutions for blocking SIM cards attached to contraband shipments. The Ministry of the Interior (MoI) was tasked with providing information and proposals on technological tools that would allow SIM cards used in smugglers' tracking devices to be blocked from identifying the landing sites of balloons.

It was further decided to explore technologies capable of neutralising the balloons. The MoI will prepare the necessary technical specifications and submit them to the Ministry of the Economy and Innovation, which will seek high-tech companies capable of developing solutions for balloon detection, tracking, and neutralisation. The aim is to make smuggling activities economically unprofitable and unattractive to smugglers.

In addition, the Ministry of Foreign Affairs was instructed to warn Belarus that failure to take action against smugglers launching balloons or drones from its territory may lead Lithuania to consider a longer-term closure of border control points. Lithuania emphasises that such activity poses a direct threat to civil aviation and public safety. Lithuanian authorities maintain constant contact with border institutions in Poland and Latvia, where similar incidents have also been recorded.

==== Labour and Social Policy ====
Prime Minister Inga Ruginienė’s government has prioritised social welfare, pension reform, and labour protections. In August 2025, while presenting her government priorities, Ruginienė stated that her administration would focus on increasing the minimum monthly wage, accelerating pension growth, and revising social support indicators to better assist low-income families. She also pledged to improve access to healthcare services and reduce poverty levels across Lithuania.

In June 2025, Lithuania’s parliament approved reforms to the second-pillar pension system prepared by the Ministry of Social Security and Labour under Ruginienė’s leadership. The reform introduced voluntary participation, removed automatic enrolment, expanded withdrawal possibilities, and allowed contributors greater flexibility in suspending or adjusting pension contributions.

==== Healthcare and Regional Access ====
Ruginienė has publicly supported efforts to improve healthcare accessibility in Lithuania’s regions and reduce inequalities between urban and rural municipalities. In October 2025, Ruginienė became patron of the “Rožinis Autobusas” (“Pink Bus”) initiative, which provides mobile breast cancer screening and preventive healthcare services for women living outside major cities. During the event, the Prime Minister stated that preventive healthcare and equal access to medical services must remain a national priority.

==== Agriculture and Rural Economy ====
The government placed increased attention on Lithuania’s agricultural sector, particularly dairy farming and the economic stability of rural communities. In October 2025, Ruginienė met with representatives of Lithuanian dairy producers to discuss declining milk purchase prices, market competitiveness, and state support mechanisms for farmers. During the meeting, the Prime Minister stressed the importance of ensuring long-term sustainability for domestic milk producers and maintaining the viability of rural regions dependent on agriculture.

==== Drone and Airspace Security Incidents ====
Lithuania faced several major airspace security incidents in 2025 involving drones entering the country from Belarus. On 10 July 2025, a Russian-made “Gerbera” drone crossed into Lithuanian airspace from Belarus and crashed near the Šumskas border checkpoint. The incident triggered emergency security protocols, and senior Lithuanian officials were temporarily moved to shelters as authorities initially suspected a possible military threat.

A second drone incursion occurred on 28 July 2025, when another unmanned aircraft entered Lithuanian territory from Belarus. The drone was later discovered at the Gaižiūnai military training area carrying explosive material. Lithuanian authorities described the incidents as serious security breaches and increased coordination with NATO allies regarding airspace surveillance and border protection.

Following these incidents, Prime Minister Inga Ruginienė’s government prioritised stronger aerial monitoring systems, anti-drone capabilities, and additional measures against hybrid threats originating from Belarus.

=== Foreign policy ===
==== Ukraine ====
On 29 September 2025, Ruginienė spoke by phone with Ukrainian Prime Minister Yuliia Svyrydenko. Ruginienė said that Lithuania's support for Ukraine will continue and include not only military and financial aid, but also humanitarian help. The two leaders also agreed to meet soon in Kyiv.

Ruginienė alongside her Government delegation visited Kyiv on October 6, 2025, where they met with Ukrainian President Volodymyr Zelenskyy, Prime Minister Yulia Svyrydenko, and Chairman of the Verkhovna Rada Ruslan Stefanchuk.

Olha Nikitchenko, the Ukrainian Ambassador to Lithuania met with Prime Minister Inga Ruginienė on the 24 October 2025. The Prime Minister expressed her gratitude for the warm and productive visit to Kyiv earlier this month, emphasising the relevance of the issues discussed and Lithuania's determination to turn them into tangible examples of success. Lithuanian Prime Minister Inga Ruginienė hosted Ukrainian Prime Minister Yuliia Svyrydenko and members of the Ukrainian government in Vilnius for high-level discussions focused on bilateral cooperation, European security, and civil preparedness. The meeting underscored Lithuania’s continued support for Ukraine amid Russia’s ongoing invasion and highlighted growing cooperation between the two countries in resilience and defence matters.

During the visit, Lithuania and Ukraine signed a Joint Declaration on state resilience and civil preparedness, aimed at strengthening cooperation in crisis management, civil defence, societal resilience, and responses to hybrid threats. The agreement reflected Lithuania’s efforts to draw from Ukraine’s wartime experience in strengthening national preparedness and public resilience systems.

Ruginienė stated that Ukraine’s experience, resilience, and innovation offered “invaluable lessons for Europe,” emphasising that European peace and security were currently being defended in Ukraine. She additionally reiterated Lithuania’s position that increased military, political, and economic support for Ukraine, alongside greater pressure on Russia, remained necessary.

The discussions in Vilnius also covered continued assistance for Ukraine, reconstruction cooperation, sanctions policy, and regional security coordination between the Baltic states and Ukraine.

==== Latvia ====
On 3 October 2025, Prime Minister Inga Ruginienė held a telephone conversation with Latvian Prime Minister Evika Silina. Ruginienė thanked her Latvian colleague for the congratulations extended on the start of her work as Head of Government. The Latvian Prime Minister invited Mrs Ruginienė to visit Riga in the near future to discuss the most pressing issues for both countries. In December, the Heads of Government of all three Baltic States will also meet in Riga in the format of the Baltic Council of Ministers.

==== Poland ====
Ruginienė visited Poland on 7 October 2025 and met with Polish Prime Minister Donald Tusk. During her working visit to Poland, Prime Minister Inga Ruginienė met with the country's Prime Minister, Donald Tusk. At the meeting in Warsaw, the two leaders discussed key bilateral priorities such as security and defence, support for Ukraine, joint infrastructure and energy projects, and other issues. Major joint projects of significant scope and importance – "Rail Baltica", "Harmony Link", and "Via Baltica" – are of strategic importance for Lithuania.

==== Estonia ====
Prime Minister Inga Ruginienė held a telephone call with Estonian Prime Minister Kristen Michal on 10 October 2025. The two leaders emphasised the excellent bilateral relations between Lithuania and Estonia, the importance of cooperation in defence, security, transport, and energy, also their shared commitment to supporting Ukraine.

==== European Union ====
Inga Ruginienė has maintained a strongly pro-European Union foreign policy orientation, emphasising deeper European integration, regional security cooperation, and continued EU support for Ukraine. During meetings with European leaders in Brussels and other European capitals, Ruginienė stressed the importance of strengthening the EU’s defence capabilities, protecting the Union’s external borders, and countering hybrid threats originating from Russia and Belarus.

Her government additionally supported the acceleration of Ukraine’s European Union accession process and advocated for stronger sanctions against Russia. Ruginienė argued that European security and stability depended on sustained political, military, and financial assistance for Ukraine.

Lithuania under Ruginienė also continued cooperation within regional European formats such as the Baltic Council of Ministers and Nordic-Baltic cooperation (NB8), focusing on energy security, transport integration, and defence coordination.

==== United States of America ====
Prime Minister Inga Ruginienė met with the Ambassador of the United States of America, Kara C. McDonald on 24 October 2025 to discuss the strategic partnership between the two countries and the U.S. role in helping to ensure the security of the region. The discussion also highlighted the importance of continued support for Ukraine and the key role of the United States in helping achieve a lasting and just peace in Europe.

==== Belarus ====
Following repeated drone and contraband balloon incursions into Lithuanian airspace from Belarus in October 2025, Prime Minister Inga Ruginienė’s government intensified diplomatic pressure on Minsk and coordinated responses with neighbouring NATO and EU states. Lithuania warned Belarus that continued failures to prevent cross-border aerial incidents could result in longer-term closures of border checkpoints.

Ruginienė described the incidents as hybrid threats against Lithuania and stressed the importance of regional cooperation in protecting NATO’s eastern flank. Lithuanian authorities maintained close coordination with Poland and Latvia, where similar incidents involving balloons and drones had also been recorded.

==== Iceland ====
Inga Ruginienė visited Iceland in November 2025, where she met with Icelandic Prime Minister Kristrún Frostadóttir and participated in the Reykjavik Global Forum. Discussions focused on NATO cooperation, Nordic–Baltic (NB8) cooperation, support for Ukraine, regional security, and hybrid threats linked to Russia and Belarus.

Ruginienė additionally highlighted the historical relationship between Lithuania and Iceland, noting Iceland’s role as the first country to recognise the restoration of Lithuanian independence in 1991. During the visit, she also met with representatives of the Lithuanian diaspora in Iceland.

==== Holy See ====
Ruginienė visited the Holy See and Vatican City in March 2026. During the visit, she was received in audience by Pope Leo XIV and met with Archbishop Paul Richard Gallagher, Secretary for Relations with States and International Organizations.

Discussions focused on bilateral relations between Lithuania and the Holy See, regional security, humanitarian assistance, and support for Ukraine. Ruginienė additionally visited the Lithuanian Embassy to the Holy See and met representatives of Lithuanian Catholic institutions in Rome.

==== Armenia ====
Prime Minister Inga Ruginienė visited Armenia in November 2025, where she met with Armenian Prime Minister Nikol Pashinyan. The leaders discussed bilateral cooperation, democratic reforms, regional security in the South Caucasus, and Armenia’s relations with the European Union. Lithuania additionally expressed support for Armenia’s sovereignty and democratic development.

==== Azerbaijan ====
Ruginienė visited Azerbaijan later in November 2025 as part of Lithuania’s broader diplomatic engagement in the South Caucasus. During meetings with Azerbaijani officials in Baku, discussions focused on energy cooperation, transport connectivity, economic relations, and regional stability.

== Personal life ==
Inga Ruginienė is married to Vismantas Ruginis, a businessman who manages multiple printing supply companies. Her mother, Diana Raitelaitienė, serves as the chair of the Lithuanian Federation of Forest and Wood Workers' Trade Unions. Some of Ruginienė's distant relatives live in Moscow, but she has stated that she does not have much contact with them.

Ruginienė served as a first-aid instructor and volunteer at the Lithuanian Red Cross Society from 2004 to 2016, and served on its board from 2016 to 2019. From 2021 to 2023 she served as a member of the council of the Kaunas Forestry and Environmental Engineering College.

She speaks fluent Lithuanian, English and Russian. Some commentators have noted that Ruginienė speaks Lithuanian with a Russian accent. Ruginienė attributes this to having grown up in a bilingual neighborhood of Vilnius and having spent a lot of time in her childhood in the majority Russian-speaking part of Ukraine.

Ruginienė enjoys reading detective novels and has cited The Little Prince as one of her favorite books. Her hobbies include travel and painting.
