= Mindaugas Sinkevičius =

Prime Minister of Lithuania since 2026

His Excellency Mindaugas Sinkevičius
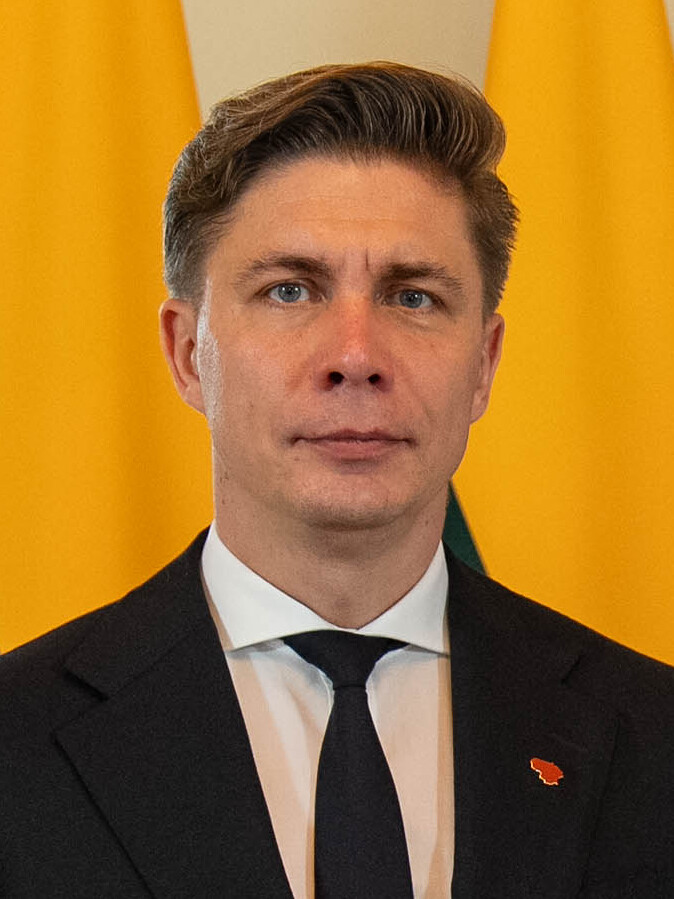
- Sinkevičius in 2026

20th Prime Minister of Lithuania
- Incumbent
- Assumed office 14 July 2026
- President: Gitanas Nausėda
- Preceded by: Inga Ruginienė

Chairman of the Social Democratic Party
- Incumbent
- Assumed office 31 July 2025
- Preceded by: Gintautas Paluckas

Mayor of Jonava District Municipality
- In office 11 April 2019 – 20 September 2024
- Preceded by: Eugenijus Sabutis
- Succeeded by: Rimantas Sinkevičius (interim)
- In office 7 April 2011 – 13 December 2016
- Preceded by: Bronislovas Liutkus
- Succeeded by: Eugenijus Sabutis

Minister of Economy of Lithuania
- In office 13 December 2016 – 13 October 2017
- President: Dalia Grybauskaitė
- Prime Minister: Saulius Skvernelis
- Preceded by: Evaldas Gustas
- Succeeded by: Virginijus Sinkevičius

Personal details
- Born: 20 June 1984 (age 42) Jonava, Lithuanian SSR, Soviet Union
- Party: LSDP (2004–present)
- Spouse: Aistė Sinkevičienė née Plūkaitė (m. 2017)
- Children: 2
- Education: Vilnius University (BBM, BBA); Mykolas Romeris University (LL.B); ISM University of Management and Economics (MA, PhD)
- Occupation: Jurist, Manager
- Website: Sinkevicius.lt

Mindaugas Sinkevičius (Lithuanian: [ˈmʲɪn.dɒʊ.ɡɐs sʲɪŋʲ.ˈkʲæ̌ː.ʋʲɪ.t͡ʃʲʊ̟s]; born 20 June 1984) is a Lithuanian manager and politician, who has served as the 20th Prime Minister of Lithuania since 14 July 2026. He also served as Mayor of Jonava District Municipality (2011–2016 and 2019–2024), former Minister of Economy of Lithuania (2016–2017) and Vice-Mayor of Jonava (2008–2011).

== Biography ==
Sinkevičius graduated from Jonava Senamiestis Gymnasium in 2003. He graduated from Vilnius University in 2007 with a bachelor's degree in Business Management and Administration, Mykolas Romeris University in 2008 with a bachelor of laws, and the ISM University of Management and Economics in 2015 with a master's degree and doctor of philosophy, defending his doctoral dissertation "Alcohol Consumption in the Context of Conflicting Societal and Personal Factors" on 11 September 2015, at ISM.

Sinkevičius was active in social engagements and public organizations. A member of the Social Democratic Party of Lithuania, he was elected to the municipal council of Jonava District Municipality (Lithuanian: Jonavos rajono savivaldybė) in 2007. In 2008, he became a vice-president of the Lithuanian Youth Council (LiJOT). In April 2011, at the age of 26, he was elected as the mayor of Jonava District Municipality by the municipal council. In 2015, Sinkevičius was reelected as the mayor in the first direct mayoral elections with 71.2% of the vote.

At the end of 2016, he was appointed as the Minister of Economy on Skvernelis Cabinet, the 17th cabinet of the Republic of Lithuania.

In 2017, he resigned from office at the Ministry of Economy of Lithuania.

From December 2017 to April 2019 he was Director of Uždaroji akcinė bendrovė „Jonavos vandenys“.

In 2019, Sinkevičius was reelected as the mayor of Jonava with 57.36% of the vote.

In May 2024, Sinkevičius was convicted by a court in Kaunas of abuse of office, falsification of documents, and misappropriation in a case involving damages of 1,487 euros to the Jonava District Municipality and the use of public funds to pay for his wife's phone bills and other personal expenses. He was sentenced to pay a 12,500 euro-fine and was also banned from holding public office for three years. Sinkevičius then appealed his conviction. On 19 September, the Lithuanian Court of Appeal rejected his appeal. As a result, Sinkevičius' mandate as mayor was terminated. On March 5, 2025, M. Sinkevičius was acquitted by a final decision of the Supreme Court. The court ruled that Sinkevičius’s actions could not give rise to criminal liability; therefore, the case against him was dismissed, and the previous convictions handed down by lower courts were overturned.

After Gintautas Paluckas's resignation as the chairman of the Social Democratic Party in July 2025, Sinkevičius was appointed as interim leader and was later elected in the spring. President Gitanas Nausėda nominated him as Prime Minister of Lithuania in June 2026, after Inga Ruginienė's resignation. His appointment was approved by the Seimas by a vote of 80-2. The Sinkevičius Cabinet was sworn in on July 14, in coalition with the Union of Democrats "For Lithuania" and the Lithuanian Farmers, Greens and Christian Families Union.

== Family ==
Mindaugas Sinkevičius is a son of Rimantas Sinkevičius, a member of the Seimas and the Minister of Transport in the preceding Butkevičius Cabinet. His mother Ligita is a chief specialist at the Environmental Protection Agency under the Ministry of Environment. His sister Rūta is an assistant to a Vilnius district court judge.

Mindaugas Sinkevičius is married (since May 2017). His wife is Aistė Sinkevičienė (* 1989, Plūkaitė), an interior designer from Kaunas.

Sinkevičius lives with his family in his hometown Jonava.

== Publications ==
- Sinkevičius, Mindaugas; Gineikienė, Justina; Huettinger, Maik; Adomavičius, Benas (2014). "Double Standards in the Judgment of Consumer versus Business Unethical Behavior" (PDF). Market-Tržište. 26 (1). Zagreb, Croatia: University of Zagreb, Faculty of Economics and Business Zagreb: 45–57. doi:10.22598/mt. eISSN 1849-1383. ISSN 0353-4790. OCLC 890067495. UDK 174:366-05 / https://hrcak.srce.hr/123368 – via Hrčak.
- Sinkevičius, Mindaugas (2016). "Intention to Purchase Alcohol by Adults in the Country In Transition: The Effects of Health Consciousness, Self-Efficacy and Religion Importance" (PDF). Organizations and Markets in Emerging Economies. 7 (2). Vilnius, Lithuania: Faculty of Economics, Vilnius University: 25–42. eISSN 2345-0037. ISSN 2029-4581. OCLC 6942945468.
