= Abišala Cabinet =

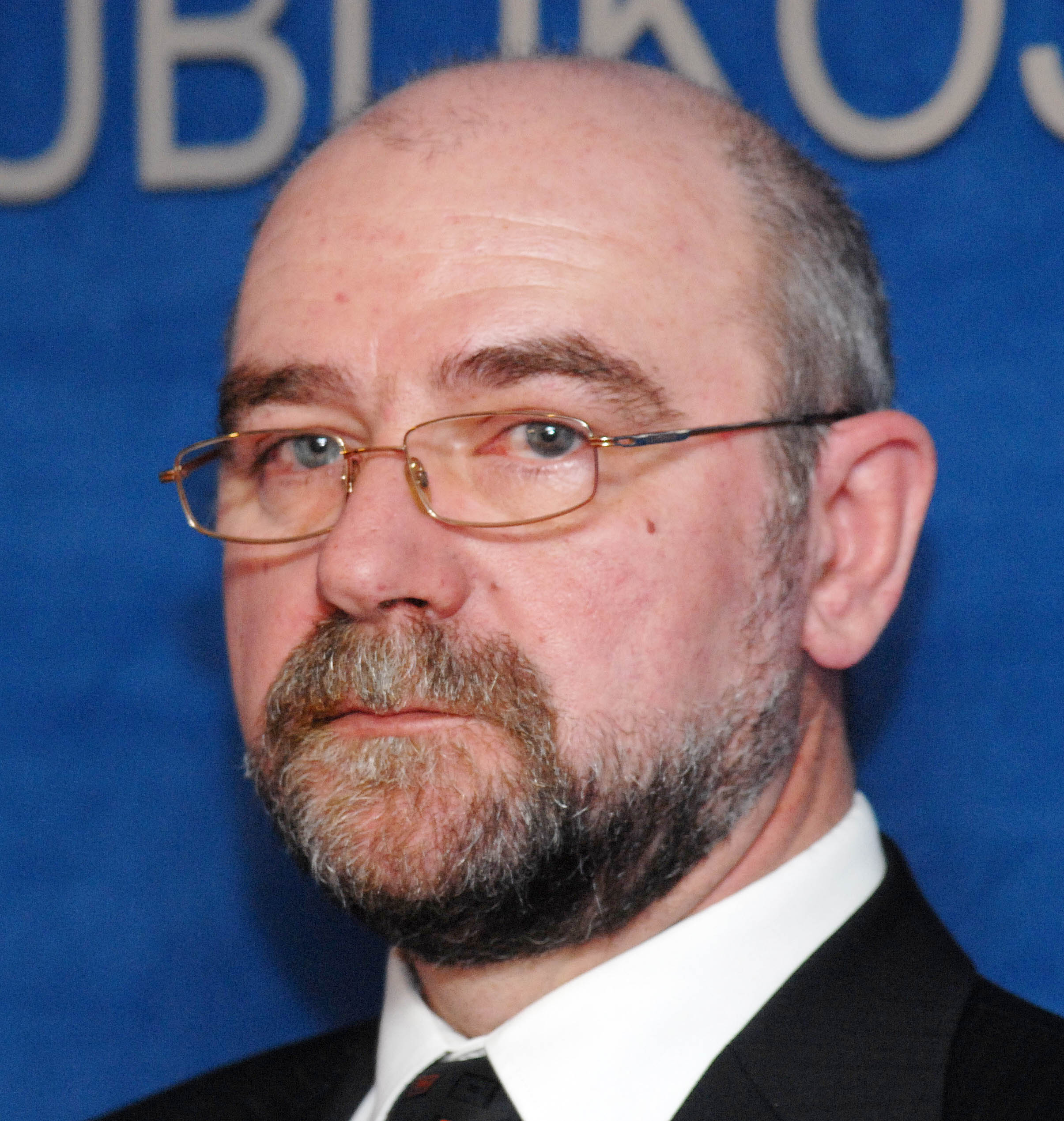
Prime Minister Aleksandras Abišala

The Abišala Cabinet was the 4th cabinet of Lithuania since 1990. It consisted of the Prime Minister and 18 government ministers.

== History ==
Aleksandras Abišala was appointed the Prime Minister by the Supreme Council of Lithuania on 21 July 1992, after the previous government, headed by Gediminas Vagnorius, resigned amidst internal conflicts.

The government served until the elections in October 1992, which were won by the ex-communist Democratic Labour Party of Lithuania, resigning on 26 November 1992. The government continued to serve in an acting capacity until Lubys Cabinet started its work on 17 December 1992.

Abišala Cabinet is remembered for unpopular decisions - cuts to public spending, fixed salaries and rising costs of utilities.

== Cabinet ==
The following ministers served on the Abišala Cabinet.

Position	Name
Deputy Prime Minister	Bronislovas Lubys
Ministry of Agriculture	Rimvydas Survila
Ministry of Culture and Education	Darius Kuolys
Ministry of Economy	Albertas Šimėnas
Ministry of Finance	Audrius Misevičius
Ministry of Foreign Affairs	Algirdas Saudargas
Ministry of Health	Juozas Olekas
Ministry of the Interior	Petras Valiukas
Ministry of Justice	
Ministry of Defence	Audrius Butkevičius
Ministry of Social Security	Teodoras Medaiskis
Ministry of Transport and Communications	Jonas Bižiškis
Ministry of Energy	Leonas Ašmantas
Ministry of Forestry	Jonas Klimas
Ministry of International Economic Relations	Vytenis Aleškaitis
Ministry of Industry and Trade	
Ministry of Communications and Informatics	Gintautas Žintelis
Ministry of Construction and Urbanistics	Algimantas Nasvytis
Minister without portfolio	Leonas Kadžiulis
Minister without portfolio	Stasys Kropas
Minister without portfolio	Gediminas Šerkšnys
