= Lubys Cabinet =

The Lubys Cabinet was the 5th cabinet of Lithuania since 1990. It consisted of the Prime Minister and 17 government ministers.

== History ==
After the 1992 Lithuanian parliamentary election, Democratic Labour Party of Lithuania (LDDP) had the majority in the Lithuanian parliament, the Seimas. The leader of the LDDP, Algirdas Brazauskas was elected the Speaker of the Sixth Seimas and assumed the role of the acting president. Brazauskas appointed an independent business manager (and former Deputy Prime Minister in Abišala Cabinet) Bronislovas Lubys as the Prime Minister on 12 December 1992. It was understood that Lubys Cabinet would be short-lived as it would have to return its mandate after the presidential elections in early 1993. The government received its mandate and started its work on 17 December 1992, after the Seimas gave assent to its program.

The government served until the presidential elections, returning its mandate on 26 February 1993. The government continued to serve in an acting capacity until Šleževičius Cabinet started its work on 31 March 1993.

== Cabinet ==
The following ministers served on the Lubys Cabinet.

Position	Name	From	To
Ministry of Agriculture	Rimantas Karazija	17 December 1992	31 March 1993
Ministry of Culture and Education	Dainius Trinkūnas	17 December 1992	31 March 1993
Ministry of Economy	Julius Veselka	17 December 1992	17 March 1993
Ministry of Finance	Eduardas Vilkelis	17 December 1992	31 March 1993
Ministry of Foreign Affairs	Povilas Gylys	17 December 1992	31 March 1993
Ministry of Health	Vytautas Kriauza	17 December 1992	31 March 1993
Ministry of the Interior	Romasis Vaitiekūnas	17 December 1992	31 March 1993
Ministry of Justice	Jonas Prapiestis	17 December 1992	31 March 1993
Ministry of Defence	Audrius Butkevičius	17 December 1992	31 March 1993
Ministry of Social Security	Teodoras Medaiskis	17 December 1992	31 March 1993
Ministry of Transport and Communications	Jonas Bižiškis	17 December 1992	31 March 1993
Ministry of Energy	Leonas Ašmantas	17 December 1992	31 March 1993
Ministry of Forestry	Jonas Klimas	17 December 1992	31 March 1993
Ministry of Industry and Trade	Albertas Sinevičius	17 December 1992	31 March 1993
Ministry of Communications and Informatics	Gintautas Žintelis	17 December 1992	31 March 1993
Ministry of Construction and Urbanistics	Algirdas Vapšys	17 December 1992	31 March 1993
Minister without portfolio for municipal affairs	Algimantas Matulevičius	17 December 1992	31 March 1993
