= Šleževičius Cabinet =

The Šleževičius Cabinet was the 6th cabinet of Lithuania since 1990. It consisted of the Prime Minister and, initially, 17 government ministers (19 after the Ministry of Government Reforms and Municipalities was established and the Ministry of Culture and Education was split into two).

After the 1993 Lithuanian presidential election, the newly elected President Algirdas Brazauskas appointed Adolfas Šleževičius of the Democratic Labour Party of Lithuania as the Prime Minister on 10 March 1993. The government received its mandate and started its work on 31 March 1993, after the Seimas gave assent to its program.

The government served for almost three years before Šleževičius was dismissed by the parliament on 8 February 1996 in wake of financial scandals. The government continued to serve in an acting capacity (with Laurynas Stankevičius as the acting Prime Minister) until Stankevičius formed a new government that started its work on 19 March 1996.

== Cabinet ==
The following ministers served on the Šleževičius Cabinet.

Position	Name	From	To
Ministry of Agriculture	Rimantas Karazija	31 March 1993	26 September 1994
Ministry of Agriculture	Vytautas Einoris	26 September 1994	19 March 1996
Ministry of Culture and Education	Dainius Trinkūnas	31 March 1993	9 June 1994
Ministry of Culture and Education was split into the Ministry of Culture and the Ministry of Education and Science in 1994
Ministry of Culture	Dainius Trinkūnas	9 June 1994	15 November 1994
Ministry of Culture	Juozas Nekrošius	15 November 1994	19 March 1996
Ministry of Education and Science	Vladislavas Domarkas	9 June 1994	19 March 1996
Ministry of Economy	Julius Veselka (Note: Veselka resigned on 17 March 1993, before the Seimas gave its assent to the program of the government and it could start its work)		
Ministry of Economy	Aleksandras Vasiliauskas	9 June 1994	5 October 1995
Ministry of Economy	Vytas Navickas	5 October 1995	19 March 1996
Ministry of Environmental Protection	Bronius Bradauskas	31 March 1993	19 March 1996
Ministry of Finance	Eduardas Vilkelis	31 March 1993	10 February 1995
Ministry of Finance	Reinoldijus Šarkinas	10 February 1995	19 March 1996
Ministry of Foreign Affairs	Povilas Gylys	31 March 1993	19 March 1996
Ministry of Health	Jurgis Brėdikis	31 March 1993	10 November 1994
Ministry of Health	Antanas Vinkus	10 November 1994	19 March 1996
Ministry of the Interior	Romasis Vaitiekūnas	31 March 1993	19 March 1996
Ministry of Justice	Jonas Prapiestis	31 March 1993	17 March 1996
Ministry of Defence	Audrius Butkevičius	31 March 1993	28 October 1993
Ministry of Defence	Linas Linkevičius	28 October 1993	19 March 1996
Ministry of Social Security	Teodoras Medaiskis	31 March 1993	28 October 1993
Ministry of Social Security	Laurynas Stankevičius	28 October 1993	12 July 1994
Ministry of Social Security was reorganized into the Ministry of Social Security and Labour
Ministry of Social Security and Labour	Mindaugas Mikaila	12 July 1994	19 March 1996
Ministry of Transport and Communications	Jonas Bižiškis	31 March 1993	19 March 1996
Ministry of Government Reforms and Municipalities	Laurynas Stankevičius	1 July 1994	15 February 1996
Ministry of Energy	Algimantas Stasiukynas	31 March 1993	15 May 1995
Ministry of Energy	Arvydas Leščinskas	15 May 1995	19 March 1996
Ministry of Forestry	Gintautas Kovalčikas	31 March 1993	14 March 1994
Ministry of Forestry	Albertas Vasiliauskas	9 June 1994	19 March 1996
Ministry of Industry and Trade	Albertas Sinevičius	31 March 1993	24 May 1993
Ministry of Industry and Trade	Kazimieras Klimašauskas	1 June 1993	19 March 1996
Ministry of Communications and Informatics	Gintautas Žintelis	31 March 1993	19 March 1996
Ministry of Construction and Urbanistics	Algirdas Vapšys	31 March 1993	3 February 1994
Ministry of Construction and Urbanistics	Julius Laiconas	3 February 1994	19 March 1996
