= Gediminas (disambiguation) =

Gediminas (ca. 1275–1341) was a Grand Duke of Lithuania.

Gediminas may also refer to:

- Gediminas (given name), a list of people with the given name
- Gediminas Avenue, a street of Vilnius, Lithuania
- Gediminas bridge, a bridge in Kupiškis, Lithuania
- Gediminas' Cap, historical royal regalia of Lithuanian monarchs
- Columns of Gediminas, a symbol of Lithuania
- Letters of Gediminas, six surviving transcripts of letters written in 1323–1324 by Grand Duke Gediminas
- Order of the Lithuanian Grand Duke Gediminas, a Lithuanian Presidential Award
- Gediminas' Tower, part of the Upper Castle in Vilnius, Lithuania
- Vilnius Gediminas Technical University, a school in Vilnius, Lithuania
