= Lubys =

Lubys may refer to:

- Bronislovas Lubys (1938–2011), Lithuanian entrepreneur, former Prime Minister of Lithuania
- Luby's, operates restaurants under the brands Luby's
