= Gintarė Skaistė =

Lithuanian politician

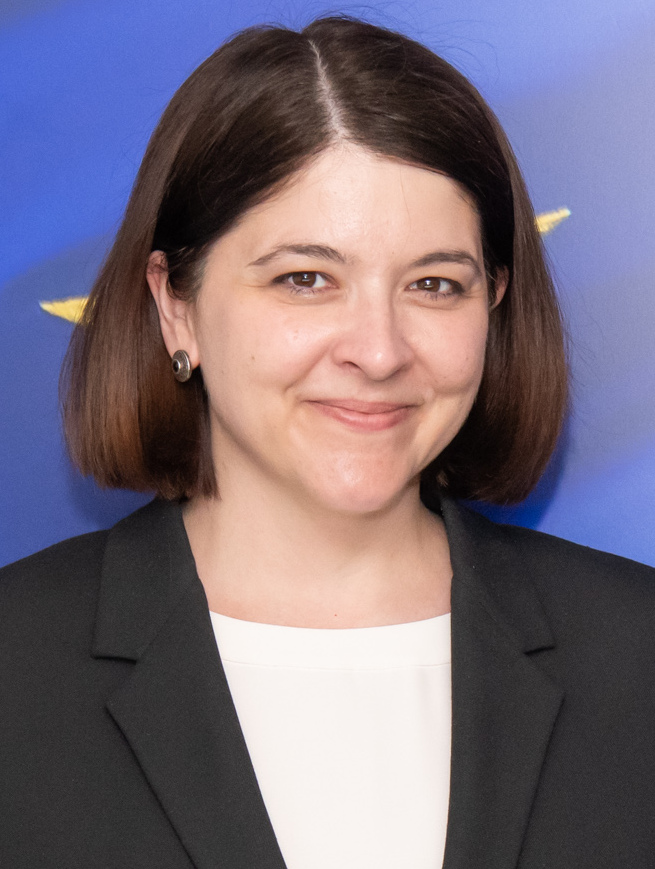
- Skaistė in 2023

Minister for Finance
- In office 11 December 2020 – 12 December 2024
- Prime Minister: Ingrida Šimonytė
- Preceded by: Vilius Šapoka
- Succeeded by: Rimantas Šadžius

Acting Minister of Education, Science and Sports
- In office 14 November 2024 – 12 December 2024
- Prime Minister: Ingrida Šimonytė
- Preceded by: Radvilė Morkūnaitė-Mikulėnienė
- Succeeded by: Raminta Popovienė

Member of the Seimas
- Incumbent
- Assumed office 14 November 2024
- Constituency: Multi-member
- In office 13 November 2020 – 14 November 2024
- Preceded by: Aurelijus Veryga
- Succeeded by: Audrius Radvilavičius
- Constituency: Panemunė
- In office 14 November 2016 – 12 November 2020
- Constituency: Multi-member

Personal details
- Born: 4 August 1981 (age 45) Kaunas, Lithuanian SSR, Soviet Union
- Party: Homeland Union
- Spouse: Audrius Skaistys
- Children: 2
- Education: Kaunas University of Technology; Mykolas Romeris University

Gintarė Skaistė (née Šimonytė) (born 4 August 1981) is a Lithuanian politician, Member of the Seimas for Panemunė constituency.

On 7 December 2020, Skaistė was approved to be the Minister of Finance in the Šimonytė Cabinet.

On 12 December 2024, Rimantas Šadžius succeeded Skaistė as Minister of Finance.

== Education and early career ==
Skaistė graduated from Kaunas University of Technology in 2010, receiving a bachelor's degree in economics. She holds master's degree in economics (2011) from Mykolas Romeris University, and a PhD of Social Sciences.

She worked at the Lithuanian Social Market Development Institute. Skaistė also is a Member of Lithuanian Riflemen's Union and Honorary Member of the Lithuanian Community of the Atlantic Treaty.

== Political career ==
Since 2005 Skaistė has been a member of the Homeland Union. Between 2007 and 2016 she was member of Kaunas municipal council. In 2016 she was elected member of the Seimas.

== Controversies ==
=== Regulatory shortcomings ===
End of Skaistė's term as finance minister in 2024 was punctuated by greatest financial scandals to rock Lithuania for decades.

==== BaltCap ====
In February 2024 Šarūnas Stepukonis, an executive at BaltCap, a leading investment fund, was accused of having embezzled over €40m and subsequently losing them on casino bets and trading on Interactive Brokers. This resulted in write-offs by private pension funds in multiple countries. All controls by more than 10 supervisory institutions, most of them under Skaistė's ministry of finance, failed; Lithuanian regulators instead blamed, without providing evidence, Estonian counterparts.

BaltCap is also an investor in the family business of Gabrielius Landsbergis, the foreign minister and the wealthiest Lithuanian politician, which at the time raised concerns and official (internal revenue agency, Seimas anti-corruption commission) investigations regarding possible irregularities, such as acquisitions of state land for €1, using state property to create private wealth and reliance of the private education business model on state subsidies. Prior to the Stepukonis debacle BaltCap was also involved in controversial large-scale public concessions in Lithuania, such as the Lithuania National Stadium and supposedly charitable rebuilding projects in Ukraine.

The BaltCap investigation is led by the European Public Prosecutor's Office.

==== The fintechs: FoxPay, iSun, Kevin, Bitandpay ====
In May 2024 Lithuania was shaken by a scandal where a number of Lithuanian fintech companies (FoxPay, iSun, Kevin, Bitandpay and others) were found to have laundered offshore casino and possibly drug and German brothel funds across the EU while simultaneously winning multiple (84) tenders to handle payments for Lithuanian state institutions, at 5 times the price charged to the private sector.

Some of the startups maintained family relations and sponsored private jet trips to Dubai for another minister, Monika Navickienė, who subsequently resigned. It turned out the regulators had been looking the other way; the minister's husband turned out to have been a paid PR agent for a convicted financial felon from Russia while the beneficial owner of some of the fintechs was cohabiting with a convicted financial felon from Lithuania.

After the media furor, Ieva Trinkūnaitė, the beneficial owner of FoxPay, was declared to be risk to national security and told to relinquish her ownership stake and executive role. As of August 2024 most Lithuanian institutions are still using FoxPay for their taxpayer-facing payments.

==== Revolving door between ministry & regulated companies ====
Finance ministry and subordinate institutions are responsible for supervising the cryptocurrency sector.

Lithuanian regulators often enjoy a revolving door with the companies they have recently regulated, and in some cases, stints across multiple regulators and regulated companies simultaneously.

For example, Saulius Galatiltis, a former Bank of Lithuania regulator who became head of Lithuanian branch of Binance which closed following the record-breaking US prosecution of the exchange and its CEO Changpeng Zhao for money laundering, was appointed and later quietly let go by Skaistė from board of INVEGA, the taxpayper-and-EU-funded national promotional institution (a quango) providing preferential financial terms to national businesses. Galatiltis was simultaneously CEO and shareholder of FoxPay, while a wife of leading official at Financial Crime Investigation Service under Skaistė's ministry of finance was found to be employed as head of regulatory compliance at FoxPay, and the beneficial owner is daughter of a former Bank of Lithuania board member.

==== Deputy minister corruption allegations ====
In October 2024 deputy minister Rūta Bilkštytė was accused of failing to declare a conflict of interest when INVEGA, a subsidiary of the ministry, used 3 EU-cofunded venture capital funds to invest ~EUR1m in Amlyze, an anti-money laundering tech startup founded by Bilkštytė's son Gabrielius Erikas Bilkštys together with Jekaterina Govina, a former Bank of Lithuania regulator. Bilkštytė amended her interests' declaration to include her son on June 14, 2024, on the same date as the minister let go Saulius Galatiltis of Foxpay and Binance from INVEGA's board. Bilkštys had been a decade-long business partner of Vilhelmas Germanas (formerly known as Vilius Židelis), a convicted felon and key owner of Foxpay, who facilitated a private-jet Dubai vacation of Monika Navickienė, another minister who was subsequently forced to resign. Germanas was arrested for an initial term of 2 months in October 2024.

==== Breaking Russia sanctions ====
During Skaistė's tenure as minister Lithuanian fintechs and cryptocurrency companies have been accused of breaking sanctions on Russia, including by both Transparency International and Reuters.

==== Lost bid to host EU's AML Authority ====
In February 2024 the ministry lost its bid to host the EU's Anti-Money Laundering Authority in Vilnius; it did not make the shortlist. Shortly after Eurojust announced discovery of a €2 billion money laundering network run by a Lithuanian financial institution.

==== Weak regulation, further deregulation ====
Transparency International, EU lawmakers and the Financial Times have severely criticized Lithuania for lax financial oversight and its part in global financial scandals such as the Wirecard scandal perpetrated by a Russian spy.

According to the Bank of Lithuania, as of February 2023 none of the fintech companies it supervised were compliant with regulations. At least half of the registered cryptocurrency companies are estimated to be shell companies (even after regulatory action recently halving the company count).

In the face of Lithuanian institutions' failure to regulate, in 2023 finance ministry and Bank of Lithuania initiated change in law that would reduce fintech fines by 30% and remove requirement for the regulator to go to court, thus further deregulating the fintech industry.

=== Unaccounted expenses ===
In 2023 Skaistė repaid €14,000 of expenses she could account for during her term in Kaunas city municipality that ended in 2016, as part of a wider expenses scandal that shook hundreds of both national and municipal level politicians, leading to some ongoing prosecutions. Some of her expenses remain unaccounted for.

=== Family ===
In 2023 the minister's husband, Audrius Skaistys, was disciplined by party organs for publicly calling striking teachers "broilers" and crybabies. During Skaistė's term as minister Skaistys was also implicated in an influence peddling scandal concerning trade in government appointments by another minister, Kęstutis Navickas, and previously for illegally appropriating state land for his family home while serving as deputy head the Department of Cultural Heritage under the Ministry of Culture. In 2016 he litigated against the state after losing a competition for state employment.

=== Drunk driving ===
In 2013 Skaistė, then a council member at Kaunas city municipality, was arrested, fined and lost driving license for one year for drunk driving.

== Other activities ==
=== European Union organizations ===
- European Investment Bank (EIB), Ex-Officio Member of the Board of Governors (since 2020)
- European Stability Mechanism (ESM), Member of the Board of Governors (since 2020)

=== International organizations ===
- European Bank for Reconstruction and Development (EBRD), Ex-Officio Member of the Board of Governors (since 2020)
- International Monetary Fund (IMF), Ex-Officio Alternate Member of the Board of Governors (since 2020)
- Nordic Investment Bank (NIB), Ex-Officio Member of the Board of Governors (since 2020)
- World Bank, Ex-Officio Member of the Board of Governors (since 2020)

Seimas
Preceded by Aurelijus Veryga	Member of the Seimas for Panemunė; 2020–present	Incumbent
Political offices
Preceded by Vilius Šapoka	Minister of Finance; 2020–present	Incumbent
