= Šleževičius =

Šleževičius or Sleževičius is a surname of Lithuanian origin. Notable people with the surname include:

- Adolfas Šleževičius (1948–2022), Lithuanian politician, 6th Prime Minister of Lithuania
- Mykolas Sleževičius (1882–1939), Lithuanian lawyer and politician, 2nd Prime Minister of interwar Lithuania
