= Eduardas Vilkelis =

Lithuanian economist (1953–2023)

Eduardas Vilkelis (7 March 1953 – 22 July 2023) was a Lithuanian economist and politician who served as Minister of Finance in several governments from 1992 to 1995 (under Aleksandras Abišala, Bronislovas Lubys, and Adolfas Šleževičius)

Vilkelis also held positions of the member of the board of Bank of Lithuania (1995–2002), and was President of the Lithuanian Banks Association (1995–2005)

Eduardas Vilkelis died on 22 July 2023, at the age of 70.

== Awards and decorations ==
- 2004: Offiver's Cross of the Order of the Lithuanian Grand Duke Gediminas
