= Rimantas Šadžius =

Lithuanian politician (born 1960)

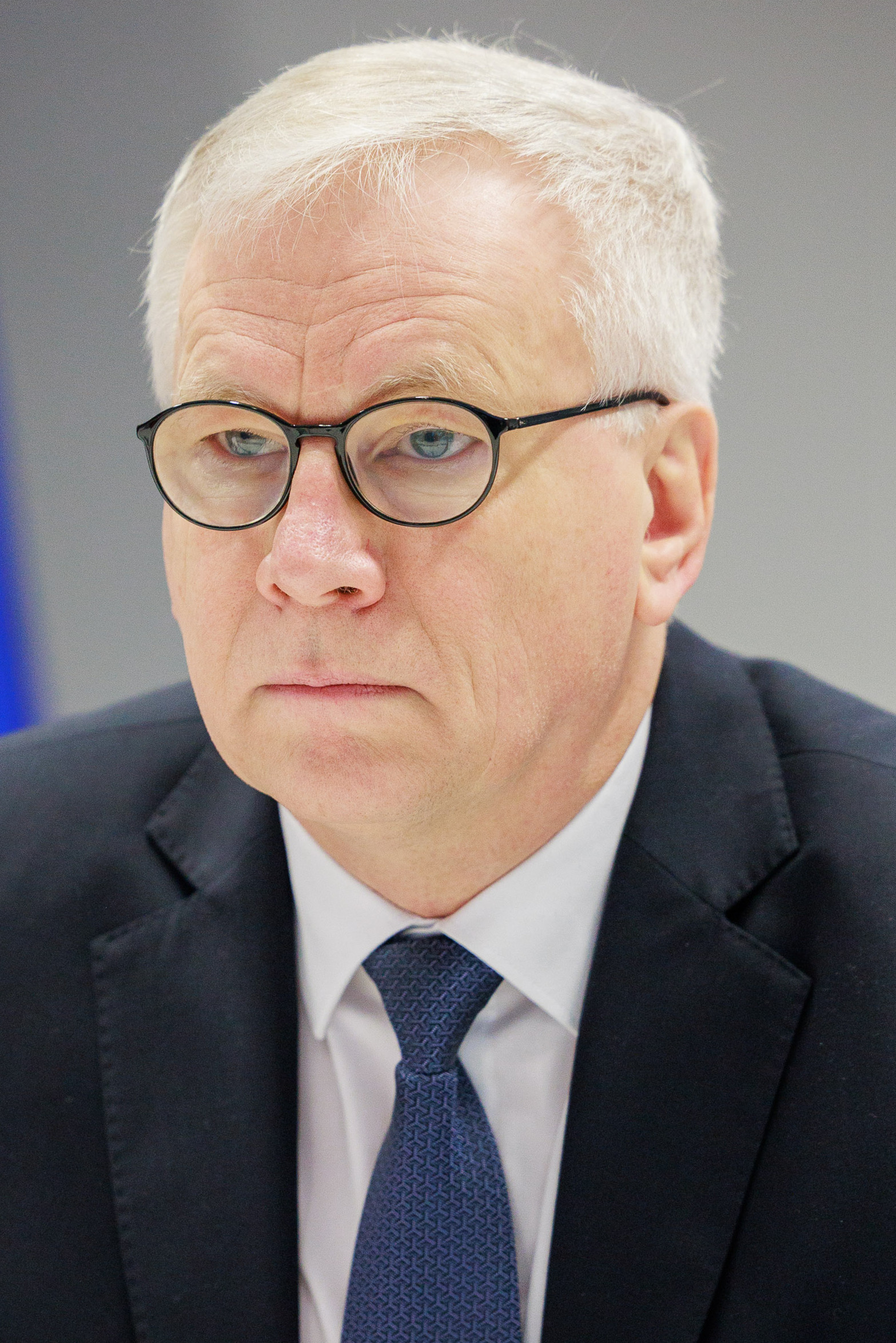
- Šadžius in 2023

Acting Prime Minister of Lithuania
- In office 4 August 2025 – 25 September 2025
- President: Gitanas Nausėda
- Preceded by: Gintautas Paluckas
- Succeeded by: Inga Ruginienė

Minister of Finance
- In office 12 December 2024 – 25 September 2025
- Prime Minister: Gintautas Paluckas; Himself (acting)
- Preceded by: Gintarė Skaistė
- Succeeded by: Kristupas Vaitiekūnas
- In office 13 December 2012 – 20 June 2016
- Prime Minister: Algirdas Butkevičius
- Preceded by: Ingrida Šimonytė
- Succeeded by: Rasa Budbergytė
- In office 16 May 2007 – 9 December 2008
- Prime Minister: Gediminas Kirkilas
- Preceded by: Zigmantas Balčytis
- Succeeded by: Algirdas Šemeta

Member of the European Court of Auditors for Lithuania
- In office 16 June 2016 – 15 November 2022
- President: Klaus-Heiner Lehne; Tony Murphy
- Preceded by: Rasa Budbergytė
- Succeeded by: Laima Andrikienė

Personal details
- Born: 8 October 1960 (age 65) Vilnius, then part of Lithuanian SSR, Soviet Union (now Lithuania)
- Party: Social Democratic
- Spouse: Dalia Sadziuvienė
- Children: 2
- Education: Vilnius University
- Website: Official website

Rimantas Šadžius (born 8 October 1960) is a Lithuanian politician and economist affiliated with the Social Democratic Party of Lithuania. He served as the Minister of Finance under Prime Minister Gintautas Paluckas, a position he assumed on 12 December 2024. Šadžius has held the finance portfolio multiple times, having previously held it from 2007 to 2008 and from 2012 to 2016. He has also served as Acting Prime Minister from 4 August to 25 September.

Following the resignation of Prime Minister Gintautas Paluckas on 31 July 2025, President Gitanas Nausėda appointed Finance Minister Rimantas Šadžius as Acting Prime Minister on 4 August 2025. He led a caretaker government until the Seimas approved the formation of the Ruginienė Cabinet on 25 September 2025.

== Early life and education ==
Born in Vilnius, Šadžius graduated from Vilnius University with a degree in chemistry before transitioning into public administration and economics.

== Political career ==
Šadžius began his political career in the Ministry of Finance, holding various senior roles before being appointed as Minister of Finance.

=== Minister of Finance ===
==== First Term (2007–2008) ====
Šadžius was first appointed Minister of Finance on 16 May 2007 under Prime Minister Gediminas Kirkilas. During this time, he worked on fiscal reforms and preparations for Lithuania's eventual adoption of the euro.

==== Second Term (2012–2016) ====
Šadžius returned to the Ministry of Finance in December 2012 under Prime Minister Algirdas Butkevičius. His second term focused on navigating Lithuania through the post-2008 financial crisis recovery, implementing tax reforms, and enhancing fiscal stability. During this period, he chaired the Party of European Socialists’ Finance Ministers Network, where he advocated for measures against corporate tax avoidance and promoted fiscal harmonization in the European Union.

==== Current Term (2024–present) ====
Following the 2024 Lithuanian parliamentary election, Šadžius was nominated by Prime Minister Gintautas Paluckas to serve as Minister of Finance, succeeding Gintarė Skaistė. He took office on 12 December 2024 and has outlined priorities that include reducing income inequality, increasing public sector efficiency, and enhancing Lithuania's economic resilience amid global financial uncertainties.

In June 2025, Šadžius put forward his candidacy to become the president of the Eurogroup, competing with fellow candidates Paschal Donohoe and Carlos Cuerpo; shortly after, he withdrew his name from consideration, citing insufficient support.

In January 2026, the Lithuanian government submitted Šadžius as a candidate to succeed Luis de Guindos in the position of Vice-President of the European Central Bank; following a vote within the Eurogroup, the role eventually went to Boris Vujčić instead.

== Post-ministerial career ==
From 2016 to 2022, Šadžius served as the Lithuanian member of the European Court of Auditors, where he focused on improving transparency and accountability in the management of EU financial programs.

== Other activities ==
- European Investment Bank (EIB), Ex-Officio Member of the Board of Governors (2007–2008, 2012–2016, 2024–present)
- International Monetary Fund (IMF), Ex-Officio Alternate Member of the Board of Governors (2007–2008, 2012–2016, 2024–present)

== Personal life ==
Rimantas Šadžius is married and resides in Vilnius. He is an active supporter of cultural and educational initiatives aimed at fostering economic literacy among young people.

Political offices
Preceded by Ingrida Šimonytė	Minister of Finance; 2012–2016	Succeeded by Rasa Budbergytė
Preceded by Gintarė Skaistė	Minister of Finance; 2024–present	
