= Taurimas Valys =

Lithuanian politician (born 1982)

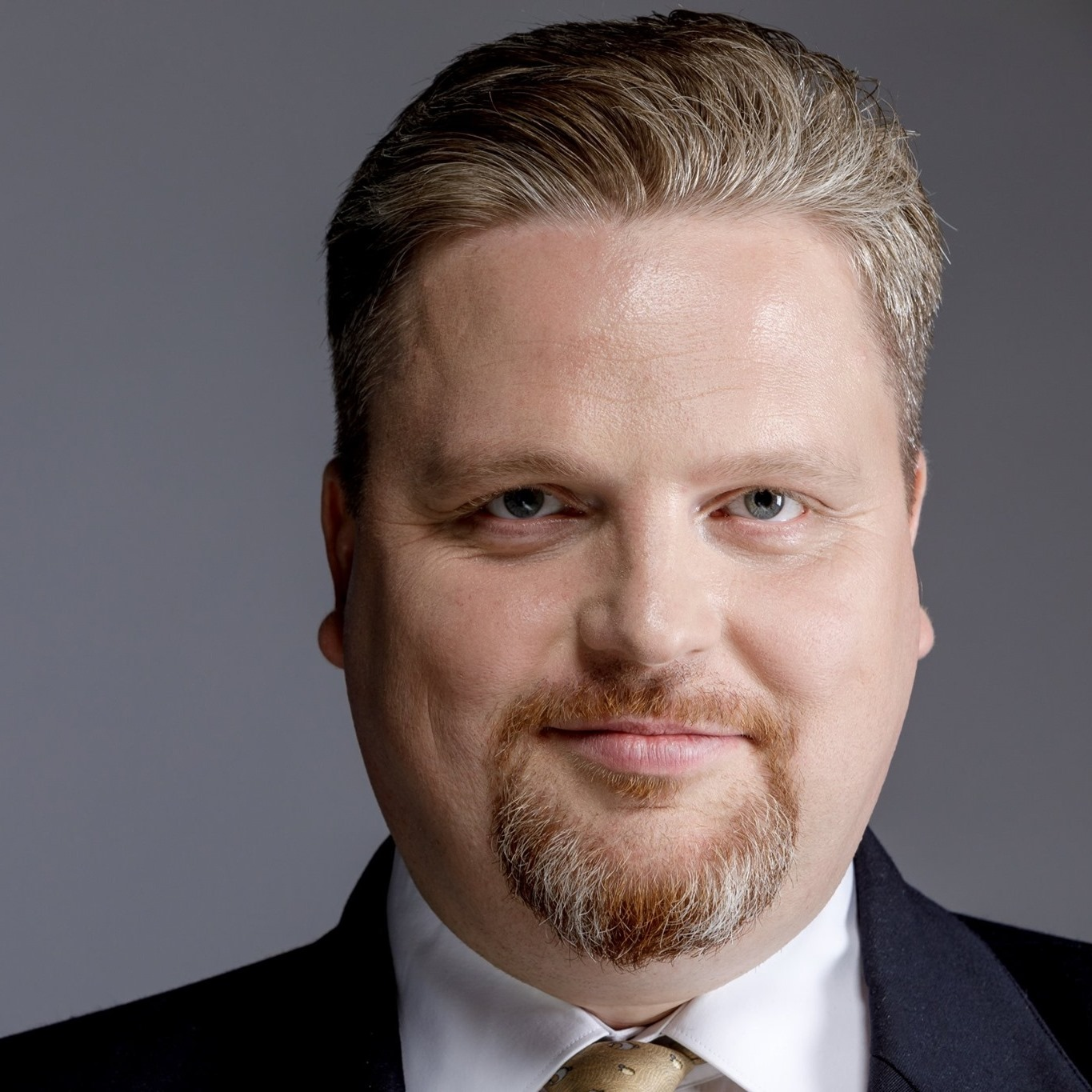
- Valys in 2020

Minister of Finance
- Incumbent
- Assumed office 14 July 2026
- Prime Minister: Mindaugas Sinkevičius
- Preceded by: Kristupas Vaitiekūnas

Personal details
- Born: 7 September 1982 (age 43)
- Party: Social Democratic Party

Taurimas Valys (born 7 September 1982) is a Lithuanian politician serving as minister of finance since 2026. From 2025 to 2026, he served as deputy minister of foreign affairs.
