= Rasa Budbergytė =

Lithuanian politician

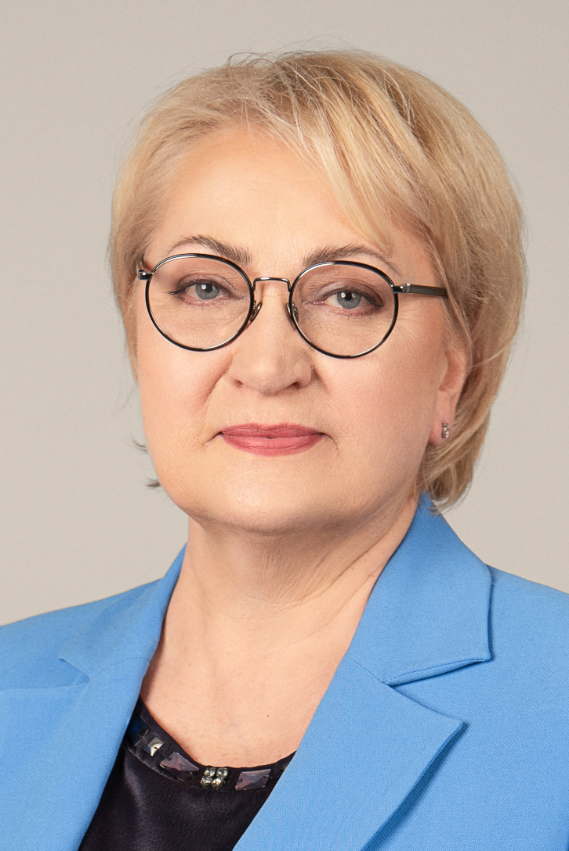

Member of the Seimas
- Incumbent
- Assumed office 14 November 2016
- Constituency: Multi-member

Deputy Speaker of the Seimas
- Incumbent
- Assumed office 14 November 2024
- Preceded by: Žygimantas Pavilionis

Minister of Finance of Lithuania
- In office 20 June 2016 – 13 December 2016
- Prime Minister: Algirdas Butkevičius
- Preceded by: Rimantas Šadžius
- Succeeded by: Vilius Šapoka

Personal details
- Born: 8 October 1960 (age 65) Vilnius, Lithuanian SSR, Soviet Union
- Party: Social Democratic Party
- Website: Official website

Rasa Budbergytė (born 8 May 1960) is a Lithuanian politician and a member of the Seimas. She previously served as state's Auditor General, member at European Court of Auditors and Minister of Finance.

== Early life ==
Budbergytė was born on 8 May 1960 in Plungė. She went to secondary schools in Plungė and Prienai before enrolling Faculty of Law at Vilnius University.

== Career ==
During 1983–85, Budbergytė led the general affairs division of Marijampolė City Council. In September 1998, she was made the Vice-Minister of Justice, a post she retained till December 2000. She has also served as a legal adviser to the Ministry of International Economic Relations (1992–93) and Auditor General (2010–2010). She was an assistant professor at the Vilnius University from 1997 to 2005.

In 2016, she was briefly appointed to be the Minister of Finance of Lithuania, since the previous minister, Rimantas Šadžius replaced her at European Court of Auditors . She was a minister till new election. In 2016 Lithuanian parliamentary election she won a Seimas seat with Social Democratic Party of Lithuania. Currently she is the deputy chair of the Committee on European Affairs.

Political offices
Preceded by Rimantas Šadžius	Minister of Finance; 2016–2016	Succeeded by Vilius Šapoka
