= Eurogroup =

Informal body of ministers of the eurozone member states

The Eurogroup is the recognised collective term for the informal meetings of the finance ministers of the eurozone—those member states of the European Union (EU) which have adopted the euro as their official currency. The group has 21 members. It exercises political control over the currency and related aspects of the EU's monetary union such as the Stability and Growth Pact.

The ministers meet in camera a day before a meeting of the Economic and Financial Affairs Council (ECOFIN) of the Council of the European Union. They communicate their decisions via press and document releases. The group is related to the Council of the European Union (only Eurogroup member states vote on issues relating to the euro in the ECOFIN) and was formalised under the Treaty of Lisbon.

== History ==
The Eurogroup, formerly known as the Euro-X and Euro-XI in relation to the number of states adopting the euro, was established at the request of France as a policy co-ordination and consultation forum on eurozone matters. The December 1997 European Council endorsed its creation and the first meeting was held on 4 June 1998 at Senningen Castle in Luxembourg .

To begin with, the chair of the Eurogroup mirrored that of the rotating presidency of the Council of the European Union, except where the Council presidency was held by a non-eurozone country, in which case the chair was held by the next eurozone country that would hold the Council presidency. In 2004 the ministers decided to elect a president and in 2008, the group held a summit of heads of state and government, rather than Ministers of Finance, for the first time. This became known as the Euro summit and has held meetings irregularly during the 2008 financial crisis.

Since the beginning of the monetary union, its role has grown in regards to the euro's economic governance. The fact the group meets just before the Ecofin council means it can pre-approve all Ecofin's decisions on eurozone affairs. In 2009 the Treaty of Lisbon formalised the group and its president.

== Organisation ==
=== President ===
The President of the Eurogroup is currently Kyriakos Pierrakakis, the Minister for the National Economy and Finance of Greece.

In September 2004, the Eurogroup decided it should have a semi-permanent president who would be appointed for a term of two years. Finance Minister and then Prime Minister of Luxembourg Jean-Claude Juncker was appointed to be the first president of the Eurogroup, mandated from 1 January 2005 until 31 December 2006, and was re-appointed for a second term in September 2006. Under the Lisbon Treaty, this system was formalised and Juncker was confirmed for another term. The presidency has helped strengthen the group, since before Juncker's appointment the Eurogroup was only present at meetings in the European Parliament. Since the position of President of the Eurogroup was created, the president has attended the European Parliament Committee on Economic and Monetary Affairs every six months.

After his reappointment as President of the Eurogroup in January 2010, Juncker emphasised the need to broaden the scope of the Eurogroup's business. In particular in terms of co-ordinating economic policies and representation. Juncker proposed creating a small secretariat consisting of four to five civil servants to prepare the group's meetings. However, although France and Spain support such plans, Germany fears that strengthening the group might undermine the independence of the European Central Bank. In June 2012, the Estonian minister of finance Jürgen Ligi was being considered as a possible successor for Juncker. In January 2013, Juncker however hinted that his likely successor would be Jeroen Dijsselbloem of the Netherlands, who was appointed second president of the Eurogroup on 21 January 2013. On 13 July 2015, Dijsselbloem was reelected.

On 9 July 2020, Paschal Donohoe of Ireland was elected to be the fourth President of the Eurogroup taking office on 13 July 2020. On 5 December 2022, Donohoe was re-elected, with his second term beginning on 13 January 2023. On 7 July 2025, Donohoe was elected for a third term that started on 13 July 2025. After Donohoe resigned on 18 November 2025 to accept the role of Managing Director of the World Bank, Makis Keravnos of Cyprus became acting President until the Eurogroup could elect a successor. On 11 December 2025, Kyriakos Pierrakakis of Greece was elected to be the fifth President of the Eurogroup.

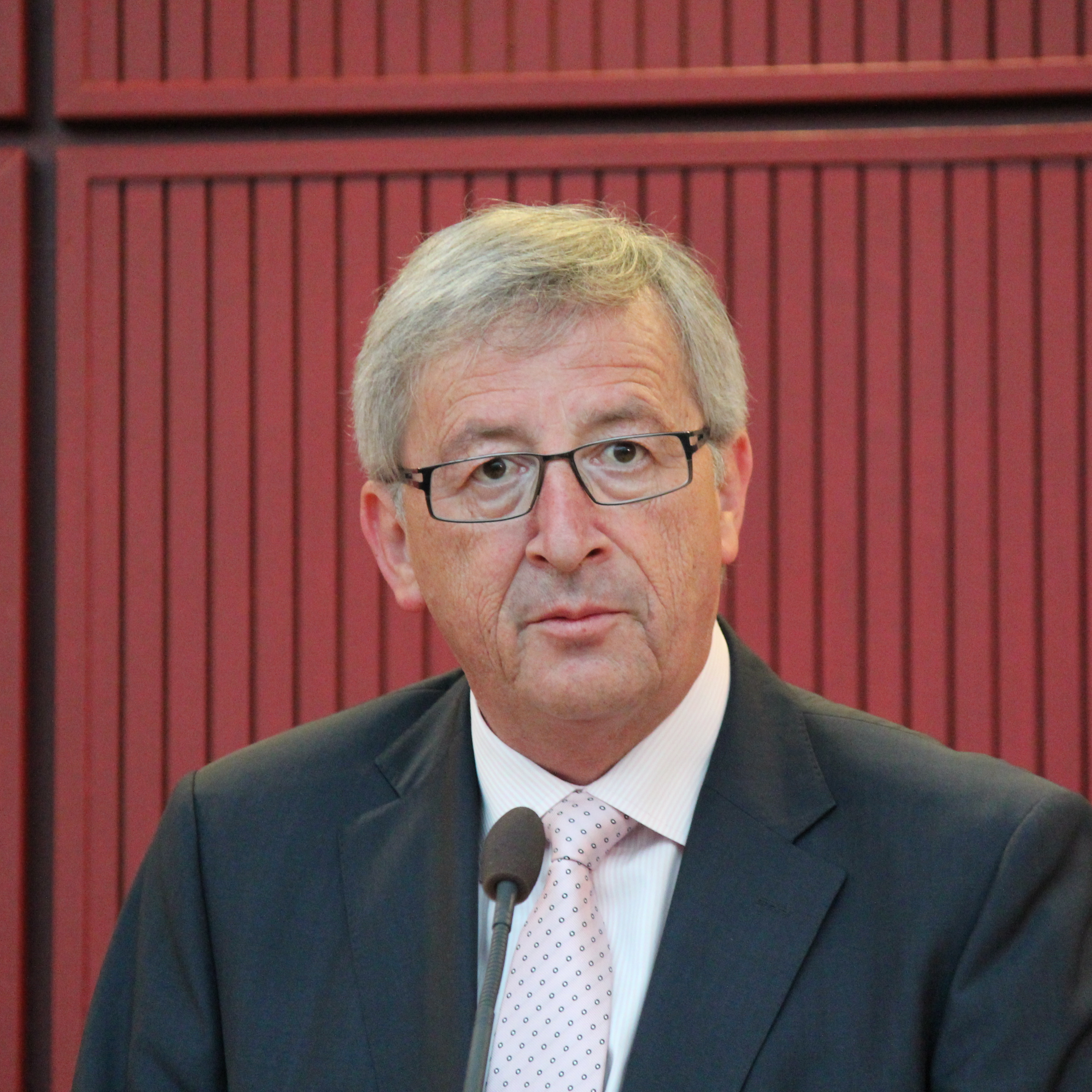
Jean-Claude Juncker
(2005–2013)
Luxembourg

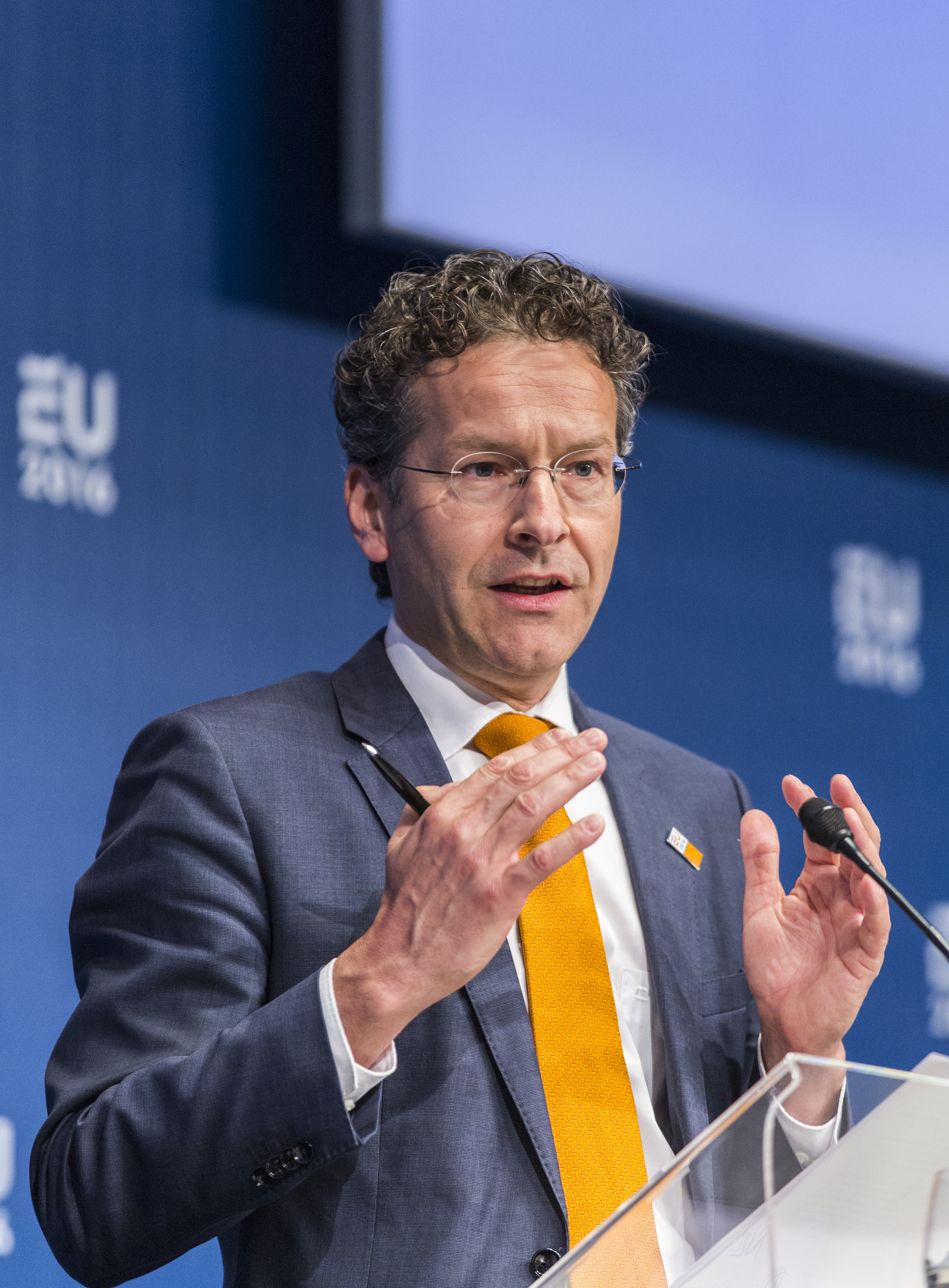
Jeroen Dijsselbloem
(2013–2018)
Netherlands

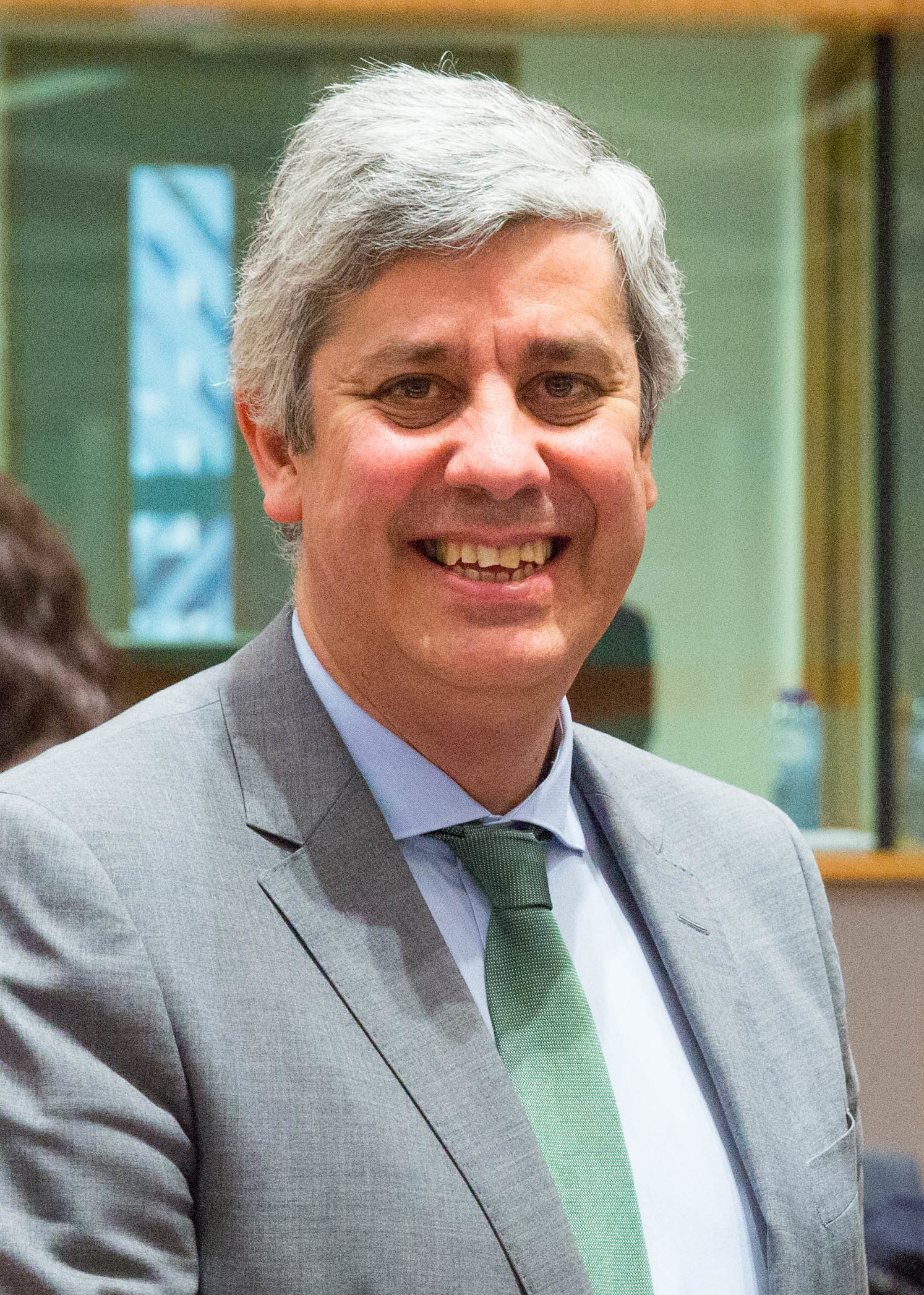
Mário Centeno
(2018–2020)
Portugal

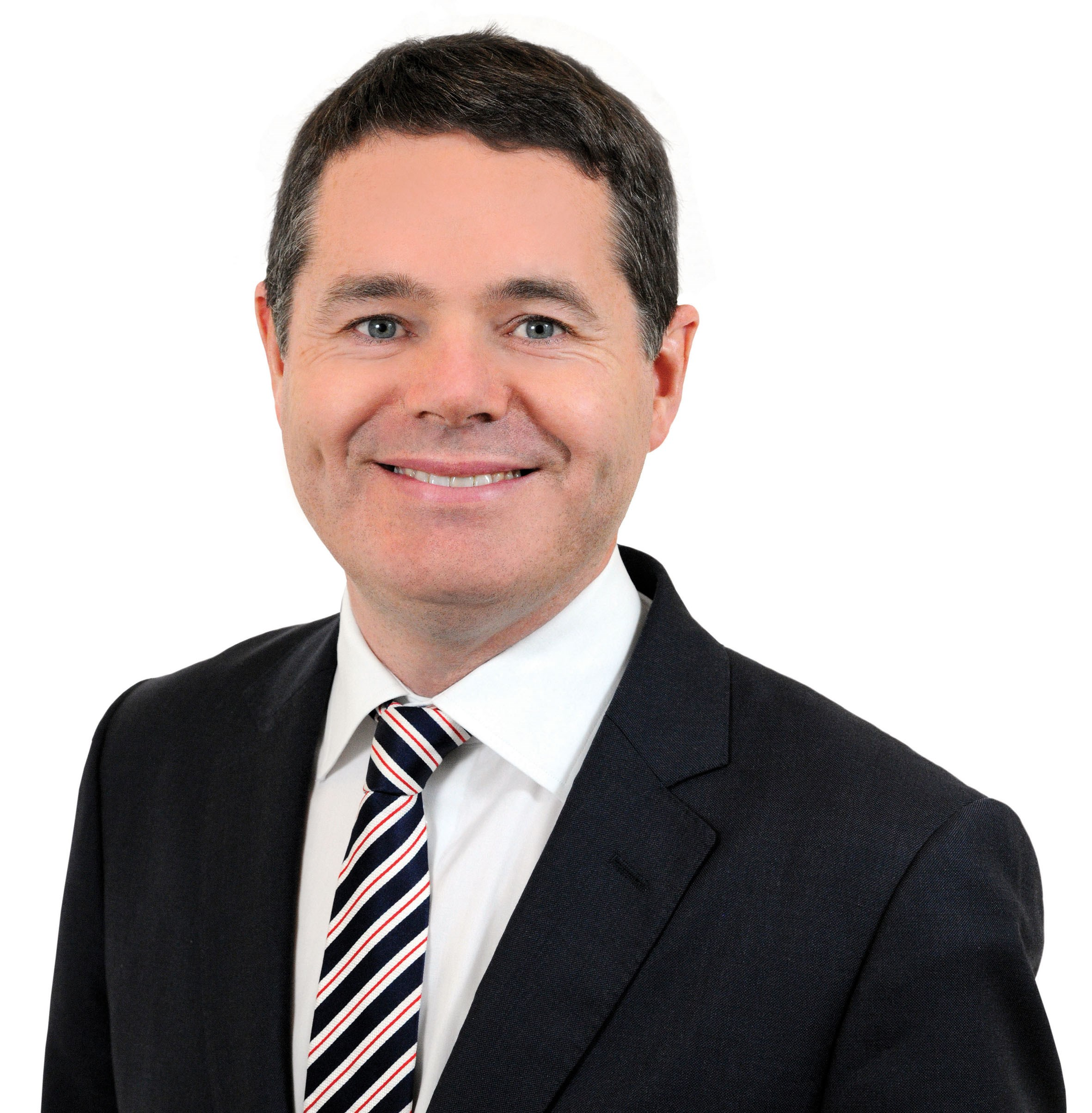
Paschal Donohoe
(2020–2025)
Ireland

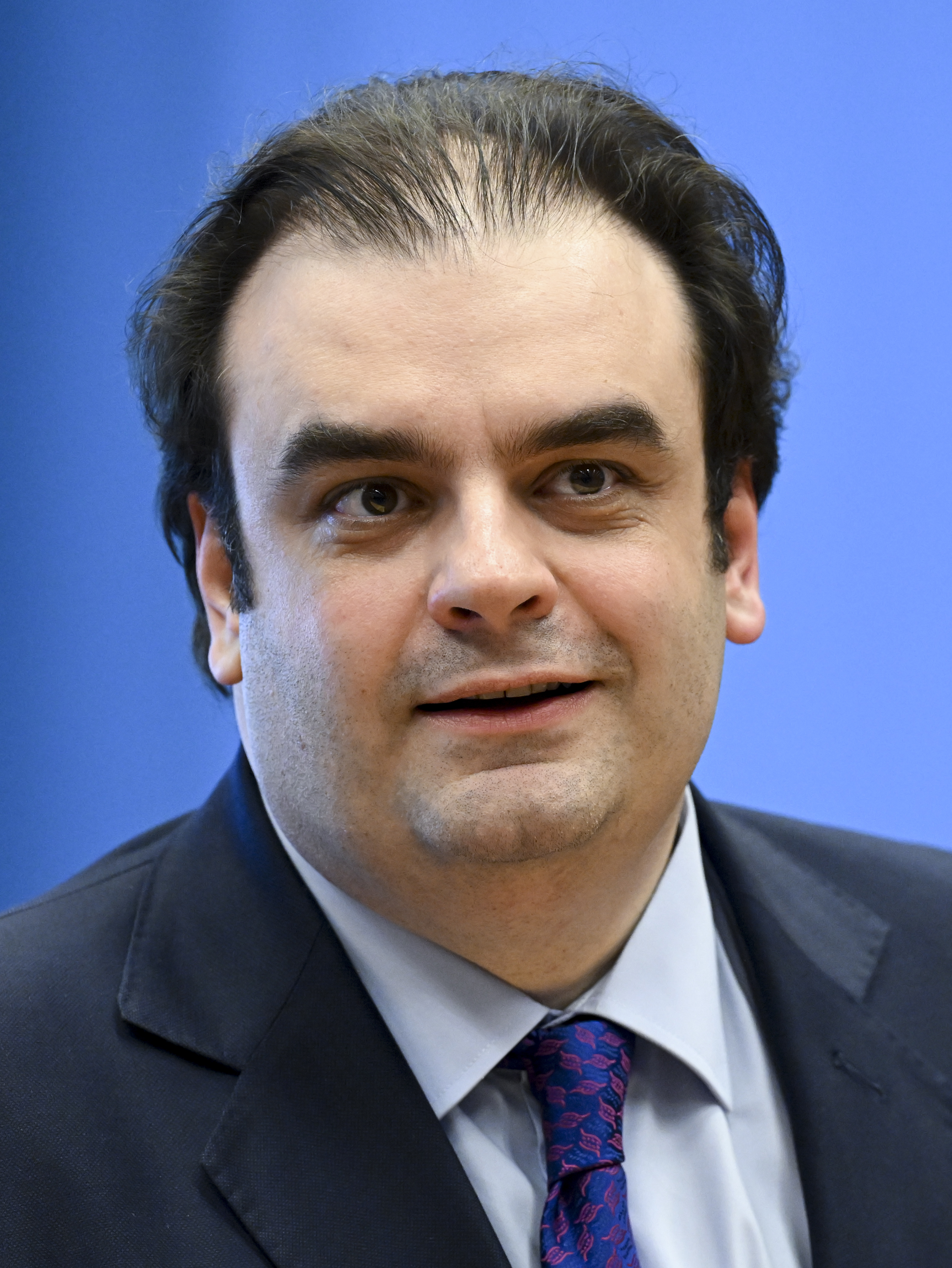
Kyriakos Pierrakakis
(2025–present)
Greece

=== Members ===
The ECB President, Economic and Monetary Affairs Commissioner and Chairman of the Eurogroup Working Group also attend the meetings as observers, unlike member states of the EU which do not belong to the euro area have been excluded from observer status. IMF personnel are sometimes allowed to be present at meetings. It is however unclear whether observers may speak or not during the meetings.

Member	Representing	Political party	Member since
Kyriakos Pierrakakis	(European Union) President (Note: Pierrakakis has served as President of the Eurogroup since 12 December 2025. He previously represented Greece at Eurogroup meetings, and continues to serve as Minister for the National Economy and Finance.)	European People's Party; National: New Democracy	15 March 2025
Markus Marterbauer	Austria	Party of European Socialists; National: Social Democratic Party	3 March 2025
Vincent Van Peteghem	Belgium	European People's Party; National: Christian Democratic and Flemish	1 October 2020
Galab Donev	Bulgaria	Independent; National: Progressive Bulgaria	8 May 2026
Tomislav Ćorić	Croatia	European People's Party; National: Croatian Democratic Union	29 January 2026
Makis Keravnos	Cyprus	Independent; National: Democratic Party	1 March 2023
Jürgen Ligi	Estonia	Alliance of Liberals and Democrats for Europe Party; National: Estonian Reform Party	23 July 2024
Riikka Purra	Finland	Independent; National: Finns Party	20 June 2023
Roland Lescure	France	Independent; National: Renaissance	5 October 2025
Lars Klingbeil	Germany	Party of European Socialists; National: Social Democratic Party	6 May 2025
Athanasios Petralias	Greece	European People's Party; National: New Democracy	19 January 2026
Simon Harris	Ireland	European People's Party; National: Fine Gael	18 November 2025
Giancarlo Giorgetti	Italy	Patriots; National: League	22 October 2022
Māris Kučinskis	Latvia	Independent; National: Liepāja Party	28 May 2026
Kristupas Vaitiekūnas	Lithuania	Party of European Socialists; National: Social Democratic Party	25 September 2025
Gilles Roth	Luxembourg	European People's Party; National: Christian Social People's Party	17 November 2023
Clyde Caruana	Malta	Party of European Socialists; National: Labour Party	22 November 2020
Eelco Heinen	Netherlands	Alliance of Liberals and Democrats for Europe Party; National: People's Party for Freedom and Democracy	2 July 2024
Joaquim Miranda Sarmento	Portugal	European People's Party; National: Social Democratic Party	2 April 2024
Ladislav Kamenický	Slovakia	Independent; National: Direction – Social Democracy	25 October 2023
Andrej Šircelj	Slovenia	European People's Party; National: Slovenian Democratic Party	4 June 2026
Carlos Cuerpo	Spain	Independent	29 December 2023

=== Observers ===
- President of the European Central Bank: Christine Lagarde (since 1 November 2019)
- European Commission: Valdis Dombrovskis (since 1 December 2019)
- Managing Director of the European Stability Mechanism: Pierre Gramegna (since 1 December 2022)

== Legal basis ==
Prior to the Lisbon Treaty, the Eurogroup had no legal basis. A formal legal basis was granted for the first time under the Lisbon Treaty when it came into force on 1 December 2009. Protocol 14 of the treaty lays out only two articles to govern the group;

Article 1: The Ministers of the Member States whose currency is the euro shall meet informally. Such meetings shall take place, when necessary, to discuss questions related to the specific responsibilities they share with regard to the single currency. The Commission shall take part in the meetings. The European Central Bank shall be invited to take part in such meetings, which shall be prepared by the representatives of the Ministers with responsibility for finance of the Member States whose currency is the euro and of the Commission.
Article 2: The Ministers of the Member States whose currency is the euro shall elect a president for two and a half years, by a majority of those Member States.

— Protocol 14 of the Consolidated Treaties of the European Union (as amended by the Treaty of Lisbon)

Furthermore, the treaty amended the Council of the EU's rules so that when the full Ecofin council votes on matters only affecting the eurozone, only those states using the euro (the Eurogroup countries) are permitted to vote on it.

This vastly informal nature has led to a number of controversies, criticisms and debates on the governance of the monetary union.

== Criticism against the Eurogroup ==
Because of its minimalist legal basis, the Eurogroup is mostly an informal body with very large discretionary powers. Though such nature may have allowed decisiveness in decision making during the euro crisis, this also led the Eurogroup to suffer from the lack of accountability and limited democratic oversight. Hence a growing number of critics by various stakeholders against the undemocratic aspects of the Eurogroup.

In 2017, the Commissioner Pierre Moscovici described the Eurogroup as "a pale imitation of a democratic body." and former Greek finance minister Yanis Varoufakis vocally denounced its "outrageous opacity". The non-transparency of the Eurogroup was a significant factor in the formation of the DiEM25 movement to "re-democratize Europe", to which Varoufakis belongs. NGO Transparency International has also repeatedly called for an overhaul of the governance of the Eurogroup. The European Ombudsman has even opened a case on the matter, demanding more transparency.

Among all those critics, here are concrete examples of democratic shortcomings of the Eurogroup:

- the Eurogroup does not publish minutes neither agenda documents from its meetings and its proceedings are vastly informal
- Conflict of interest of the chair of the Eurogroup who both represents his or her own governments and the Eurogroup as a whole;
- Domination by a restricted number of countries and/or the Troika
- Absence of accountability towards the European Parliament

== Possible evolution of the governance of the Eurogroup ==
=== Economic government for the Eurozone ===
During the 2008 financial crisis, French President Nicolas Sarkozy (speaking at the European Parliament as the outgoing president of the European Council) called the Eurogroup to be replaced by a "clearly identified economic government" for the eurozone, stating it was not possible for the eurozone to go on without it. The eurozone economic government would discuss issues with the European Central Bank, which would remain independent.

This government would come in the form of a regular meeting of the eurozone heads of state and government (similar to the European Council) rather than simply the finance ministers which happens with the current Eurogroup. Sarkozy stated that "only heads of state and government have the necessary democratic legitimacy" for the role. This idea was based on the meeting of eurozone leaders in 2008 who met to agree a co-ordinated eurozone response to the banking crisis.

This is in contrast to an early proposal from former Belgian Prime Minister Guy Verhofstadt who saw the European Commission taking a leading role in a new economic government, something that would be opposed by the less integrationist states. Sarkozy's proposal was opposed by Eurogroup chair Jean-Claude Juncker who did not think Europe was ripe for such a large step at the time and opposition from Germany killed off the proposal. Merkel approved of the idea of an economic government, but for the whole of the EU, not just the eurozone as doing so could split the EU and relegate non-eurozone states to second class members. In his 2011 State of the Union address, Commission President José Manuel Barroso opposed the Franco-German intergovernmental plan, stating that community institutions should perform that role.

=== A Eurozone finance minister ===
In 2017, a number of voices including Pierre Moscovici, Emmanuel Macron, Angela Merkel and Jean-Claude Juncker have called for the Eurogroup to formally be chaired by a dedicated Eurozone finance minister, which could in practice be the European Commissioner for Economic and Monetary Affairs and the Euro. This would constitute a step towards formalizing the Eurogroup as a branch of the European executive.

Commissioner Pierre Moscovici argued such role would bring "more democratic legitimacy" and "more efficiency" to European politics. In his view, it is a question of merging the powers of Commissioner for the Economy and Finance with those of the President of the Eurogroup.

The main task of this minister would be to "represent a strong political authority protecting the economic and budgetary interests of the euro area as a whole, and not the interests of individual Member States". According to the Jacques Delors Institute, its competencies could be centered around the supervision of the coordination of economic and budgetary policies.

For Jean-Claude Trichet, this minister could also rely on the Eurogroup working group for the preparation and follow-up of meetings in eurozone format, and on the Economic and Financial Committee for meetings concerning all Member States. He would also have under his authority a General Secretariat of the Treasury of the euro area, whose tasks would be determined by the objectives of the budgetary union currently being set up.

This proposal was ultimately rejected in December 2017 by the Eurogroup.

Critics argued that a better solution would be the creation of a permanent role for the Eurogroup President, instead of the current rotation of national finance ministers taking the rotating Eurogroup presidency in addition to their national roles.

=== International Representation to the IMF and the G20 ===
On 15 April 2008 in Brussels, Juncker suggested that the eurozone should be represented at the International Monetary Fund as a bloc, rather than each member state separately: "It is absurd for those 15 countries not to agree to have a single representation at the IMF. It makes us look absolutely ridiculous. We are regarded as buffoons on the international scene." However Finance Commissioner Joaquín Almunia stated that before there is common representation, a common political agenda should be agreed. In January 2010 Juncker indicated that the commission is to propose that the group become a member of the G20.

== Other controversies ==
=== Lack of transparency ===
The Eurogroup has often been criticized by its informal nature and the subsequent lack of transparency and accountability.

=== The Cypriot banking crisis ===
During the 2013 Economic crisis in Cyprus, Eurogroup proceeded towards the first bail-in approach towards the Cypriot banking sector, resulting in the confiscation of deposits of Cyprus' two main banks. Despite the lack of any visibility on the banks' credentials and balance sheets, Eurogroup decided to utilise deposits of the two banks for a bail-in. The process is not completed yet. However, it has been criticized by some in the EU as an attack on private property.

=== Jeroen Dijsselbloem's comments ===
In March 2017, Jeroen Dijsselbloem, the president of the Eurogroup at the time, told the German newspaper Frankfurter Allgemeine Zeitung "As a Social Democrat, I attribute exceptional importance to solidarity. But those who call for it also have duties. I cannot spend all my money on drinks and women and then hold my hand up for help. That principle applies on a personal, local, national and also on a European level." while referring to Southern European countries affected by the European Debt Crisis.

This statement led to strong reactions by many European figures, as Gianni Pitella, head of the Socialist group in the European Parliament (to which Dijsselbloem's party belongs) said "There is no excuse or reason for using such language, especially from someone who is supposed to be a progressive". Manfred Weber, leader of the European People's Party group, tweeted "Eurozone is about responsibility, solidarity but also respect. No room for stereotypes". The Portuguese Prime Minister, António Costa, said his words were "racist, xenophobic and sexist" and that "Europe will only be credible as a common project on the day when Mr. Dijsselbloem stops being Head of the Eurogroup and apologises clearly to all the countries and peoples that were profoundly offended by his remarks". Former Italian Prime Minister Matteo Renzi also called on Dijsselbloem to quit, saying that "If he wants to offend Italy, he should do it in a sports bar back home, not in his institutional role".

In a reaction Dijsselbloem said: "Everyone knows that I didn’t say that all southern Europeans spend their money on drinks and women. That’s not what was in the interview and it wasn’t my message. The anger about the interview is anger about eight years of policies to deal with the crisis. [...] I would have rephrased it otherwise probably. But it was my way of making clear that solidarity is not charity. It's not for nothing that the aid programs of the European emergency fund are accompanied by strict conditions: You get very cheap loans provided you take action to restore order. That is an important principle. For the ones who keep zooming in on those two words my message might be inconvenient. [...] It won't end well with the eurozone if we keep breaking our previous agreements. [...] My choice of words was not right, I'm sorry if you took offense, but I'm still behind the message."

== See also ==
- European debt crisis
- List of acronyms associated with the Eurozone crisis
- Euro 50 Group
