= Reinoldijus Šarkinas =

Reinoldijus Šarkinas (born 7 July 1946) was Chairman of the Bank of Lithuania from 1996 to 2011. Šarkinas graduated studies at the Economics Faculty of Vilnius University in 1968. Between 1980 and 1982 he served as Financial Adviser to the Ministry of Education in Cuba and for several years was Deputy Minister of Finance, charged with budget management. Previously, he was Minister of Finance from February 1995 to February 1996.
