= Athanasios Petralias =

Deputy Minister of National Economy and Finance of Greece
- Incumbent
- Assumed office June 2023
- Prime Minister: Kyriakos Mitsotakis

Secretary General for Fiscal Policy
- In office July 2019 – June 2023

Personal details
- Born: September 27, 1981 (age 45)
- Education: Athens University of Economics and Business
- Profession: Economist

Athanasios Petralias (born September 27, 1981) is a Greek economist and senior government official currently serving as the Deputy Minister of National Economy and Finance. He represents Greece in the Eurogroup Working Group and previously held the position of Secretary General for Fiscal Policy (2019–2023), where he managed the General Accounting Office. Petralias holds a PhD in Statistics from the Athens University of Economics and Business, where he also taught as a researcher focusing on econometrics and financial modeling. His public service career has been characterized by his involvement in Greece's post-crisis fiscal strategy, the European Semester, and the management of the Hellenic Public Debt Management Agency (PDMA). Beyond his administrative roles, he has authored numerous academic papers and a textbook on investments, specializing in Bayesian model determination and public health economics.
