= Vilius Šapoka =

Lithuanian politician

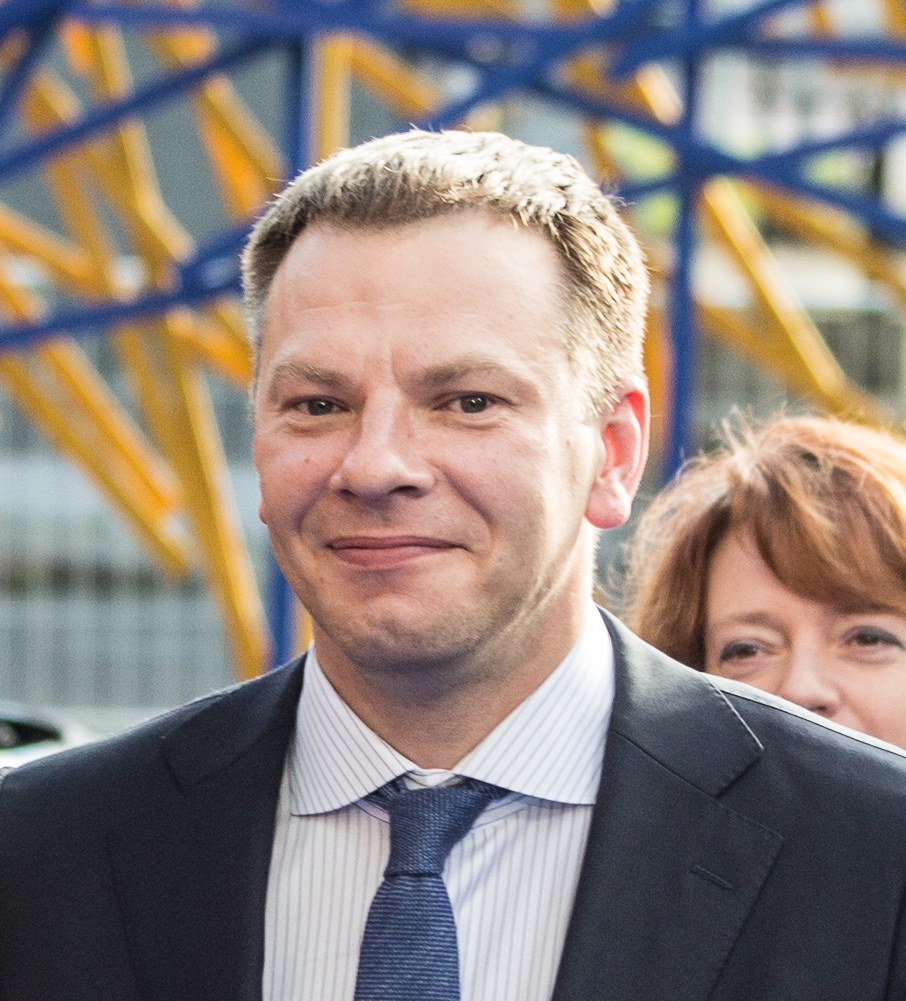

Minister of Finance
- In office 13 December 2016 – 11 December 2020
- Prime Minister: Saulius Skvernelis
- Preceded by: Rasa Budbergytė
- Succeeded by: Gintarė Skaistė

Personal details
- Born: 14 December 1978 (age 47) Barnaul, Russian Soviet Federative Socialist Republic
- Party: Independent
- Education: Vilnius University

Vilius Šapoka (born 14 December 1978) is a former Minister of Finance in Republic of Lithuania.

== Education ==
Šapoka obtained the degree of Master of Economics in Banking at Vilnius University and has an International Executive MBA from the Baltic Management Institute.

== Career ==
Šapoka started his professional career at the Lithuanian Savings Bank in 1999. From 2006 to 2012 he worked at the Lithuanian Securities Commission, first as commissioner, then vice-chairman, and finally chairman. Šapoka was employed at the Lithuanian Ministry of Finance from 2002 to 2006 in the Market Policy Department.

From 2012 to 2016 Šapoka was Financial Services and Markets Department Director at the Bank of Lithuania.

Šapoka served as Minister of Finance of Lithuania from 13 December 2016 to 7 December 2020.

== Political positions ==
At the beginning of his term, Šapoka announced that the government's goal was to raise tax revenues to 40 percent of gross domestic product (GDP) within five years from 30 percent, to help improve education and healthcare.

== Other activities ==
- European Bank for Reconstruction and Development (EBRD), Ex-Officio Member of the Board of Governors
- European Stability Mechanism (ESM), Member of the Board of Governors (since 2016)
- International Monetary Fund (IMF), Ex-Officio Alternate Member of the Board of Governors
- Multilateral Investment Guarantee Agency (MIGA), World Bank Group, Ex-Officio Member of the Board of Governors
- Nordic Investment Bank (NIB), Ex-Officio Member of the Board of Governors (since 2016)
- World Bank, Ex-Officio Member of the Board of Governors

Political offices
Preceded by Rasa Budbergytė	Minister of Finance; 2016–2020	Succeeded by Gintarė Skaistė
