= Gediminas (given name) =

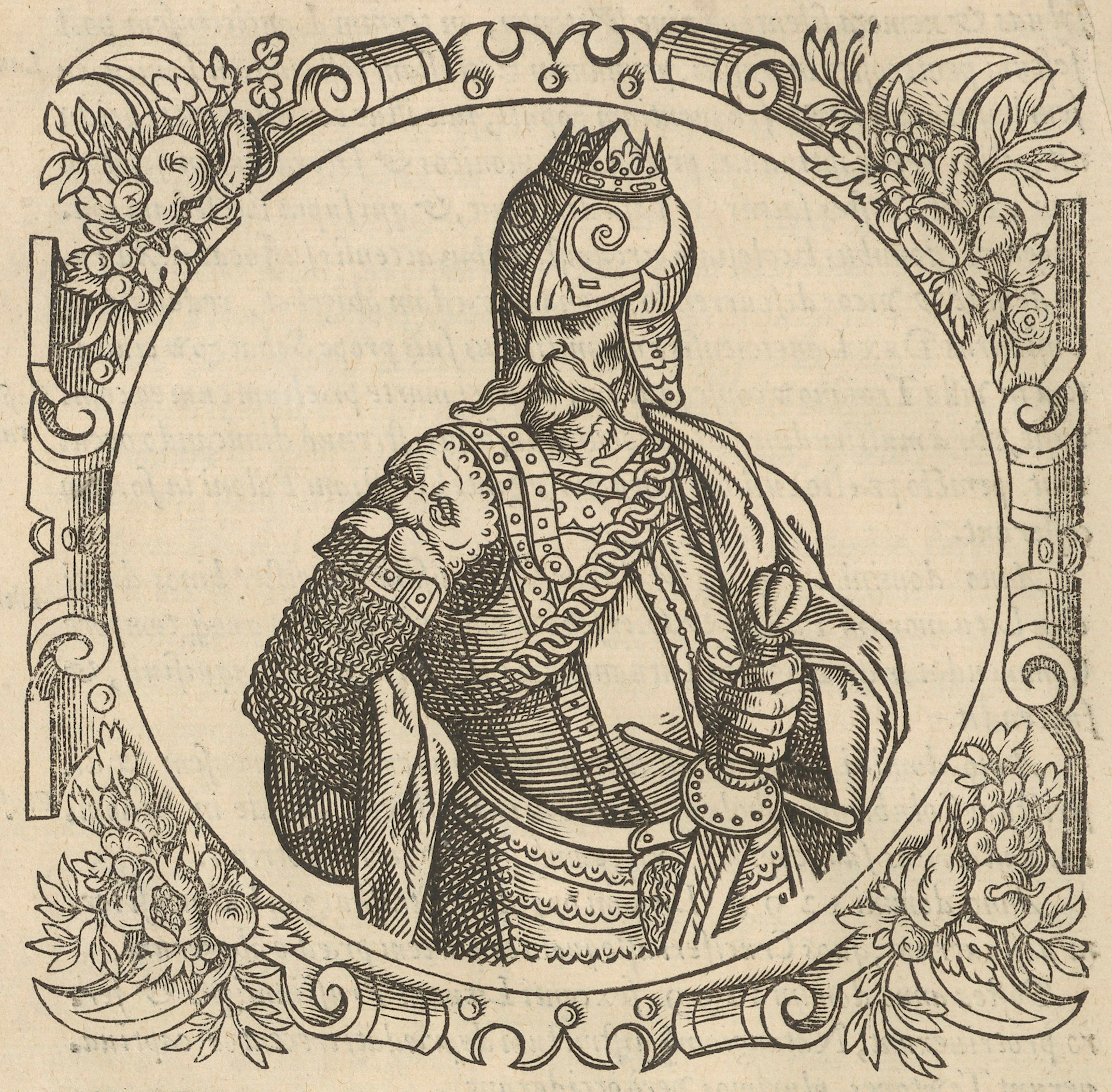
- Grand Duke of Lithuania Gediminas the founder of the Gediminid Dynasty
- Gender: Male

Origin
- Region of origin: Lithuania

Gediminas (shortened as Gedas) is a Lithuanian masculine given name. Notable people with the given name include:

- Gediminas (ca. 1275–1341), Grand Duke of Lithuania from 1315 or 1316
- Gediminas Akstinas (born 1961), Lithuanian painter
- Gediminas Bagdonas (born 1985), Lithuanian road racing cyclist
- Gediminas Baravykas (1940–1995), Lithuanian architect and painter
- Gediminas Gelgotas (born 1986), Lithuanian composer
- Gediminas Kirkilas (born 30 1951), former Prime Minister of Lithuania
- Gediminas Maceina (born 1984), Lithuanian basketball player
- Gediminas Motuza (born 1946), Lithuanian geologist and author
- Gediminas Paulauskas (born 1982), Lithuanian football defender
- Gediminas Šerkšnys (born 1948), Lithuanian politician
- Gediminas Vagnorius (born 1957), former Prime Minister of Lithuania
- Gediminas Valiuškis (born 1927), Lithuanian architect
- Gediminas Vičius (born 1985), Lithuanian football midfielder
- Gediminas Žiemelis (born 1977), Lithuanian businessman
