= Kristupas Vaitiekūnas =

Lithuanian politician (born 1983)

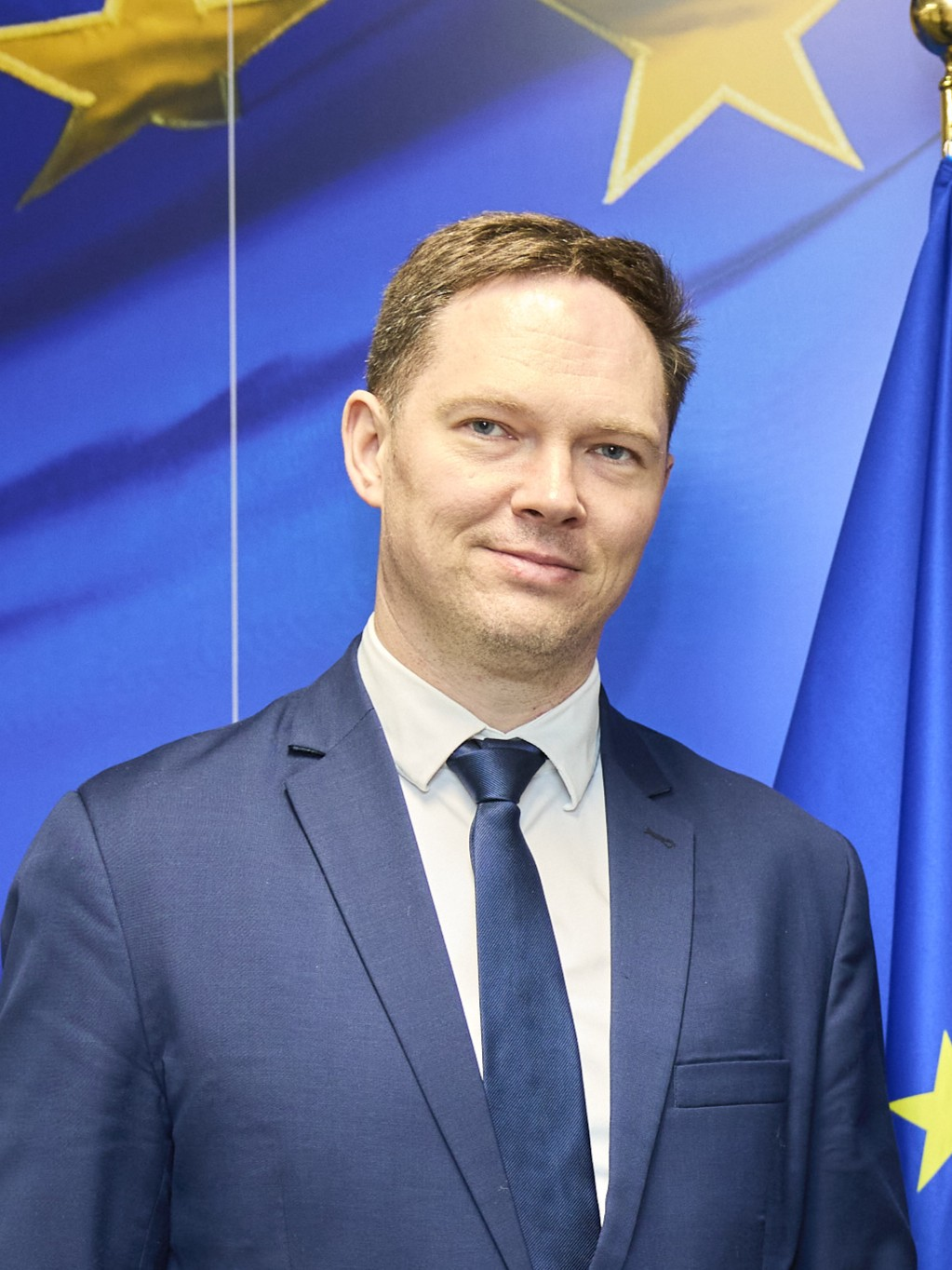
- Vaitiekunas in 2026

Minister of Finance
- In office 25 September 2025 – 14 July 2026
- Prime Minister: Inga Ruginienė
- Preceded by: Rimantas Šadžius
- Succeeded by: Taurimas Valys

Personal details
- Born: 1983 (age 42–43)
- Party: Social Democratic Party of Lithuania

Kristupas Vaitiekūnas (born 1983) is a Lithuanian politician who served as minister of finance from 2025 until 2026. From January to September 2025, he served as deputy minister of finance.
