= Panemunė Eldership =

Coordinates: 54°51′40″N 23°57′50″E

Panemunė
- Eldership
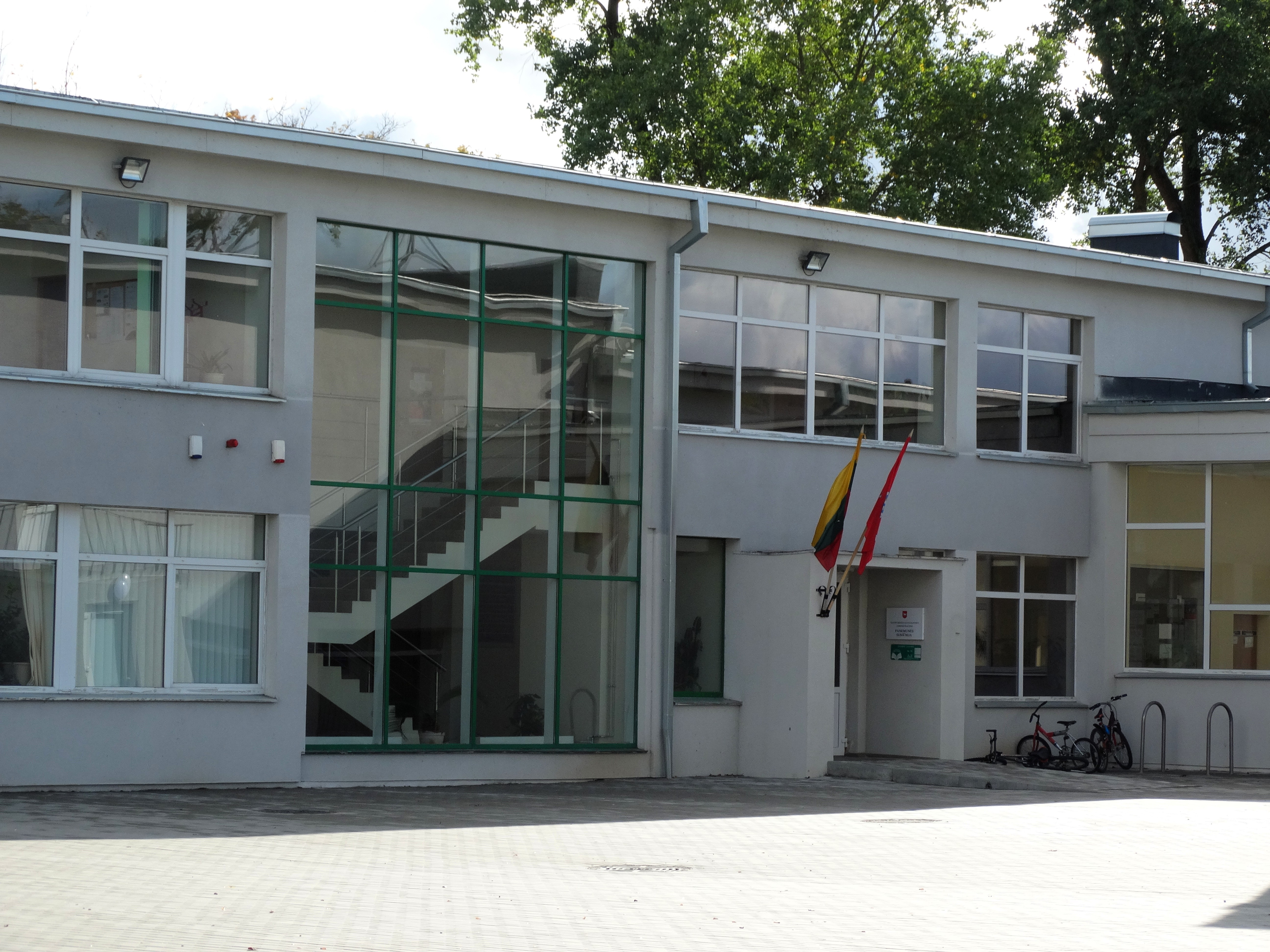
- Panemunė Eldership administration

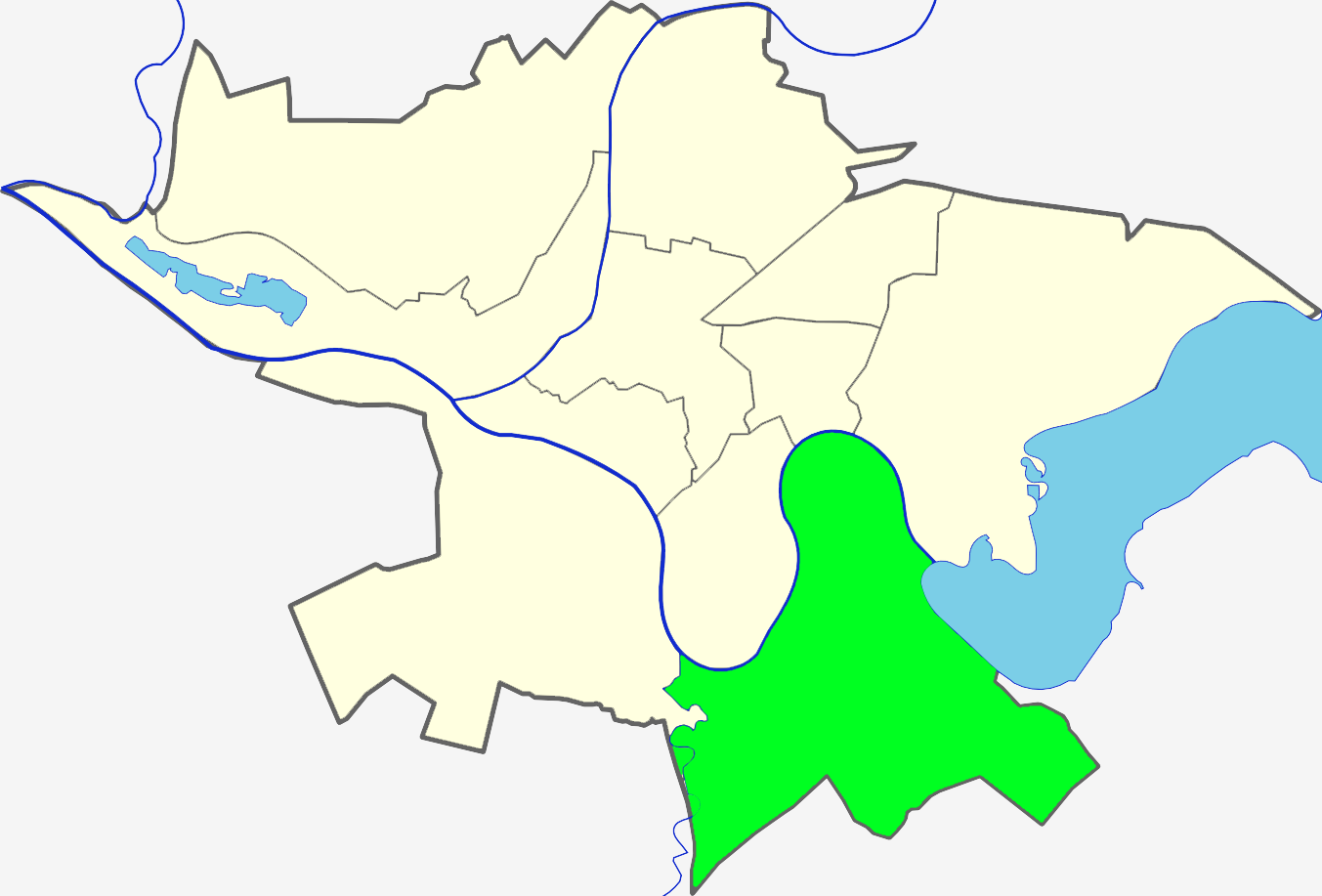
- Location of Panemunė within Kaunas
- Country: Lithuania
- County: Kaunas County
- Municipality: Kaunas city municipality

Area
  - Total: 24.8 km^{2} (9.6 sq mi)

Population (2021)
  - Total: 14,888
  - Density: 600/km^{2} (1,550/sq mi)
- Time zone: UTC+2 (EET)
  - Summer (DST): UTC+3 (EEST)

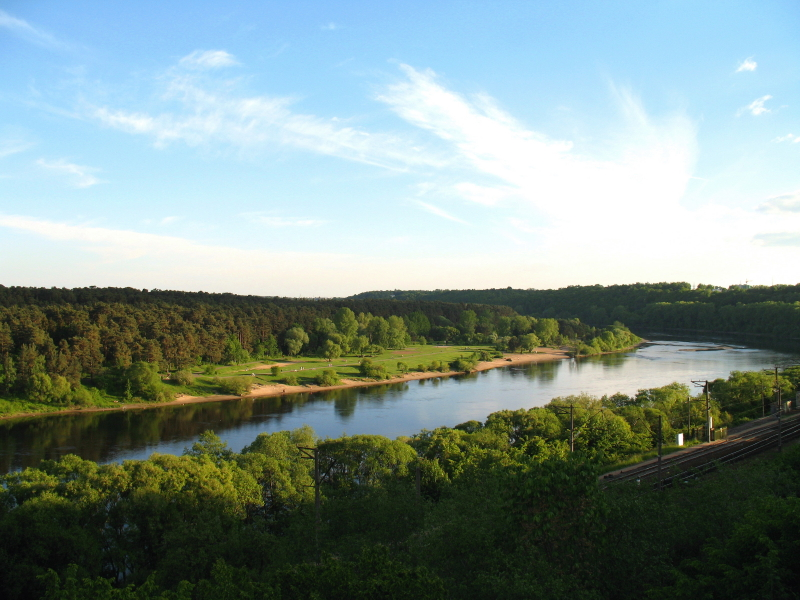
Panemunė pinewood

Panemunė Eldership (Lithuanian: Panemunės seniūnija) is an eldership in Kaunas County, Lithuania, encompassing Kaunas neighbourhoods of Panemunė, Vaišvydava, Vičiūnai, and the village of Rokai. Located on the left bank of the Nemunas River, it was formally incorporated into Kaunas in 1931. It occupies 24.78 hectares (61.2 acres) with 22,140 inhabitants.

A vast pine woods occupies a significant area. Neorenaissance style Holy Virgin Mary church built in the middle of the 19th century is located in Panemunė elderate.

Prior to World War II, Panemunė contained a significant community of Jews. Borough also has characteristics of resort town since 1930s, and has rehabilitation centers and elderly home in the pine woods of the neighborhood.

== Institutions and infrastructure ==
The first school in Panemunė was established in 1877. On 7 July 1995, Kauno Panemunės Primary Lithuanian School was established. In 1998, it was renamed to Kauno Vaidoto Primary School.

New Panemunės School was opened in 1963. In 1998, Kaunas 13th School was awarded the name of a famous adventurer, writer, and pedagogue Matas Šalčius. In 2005, it was rebranded into a catholic school and went by the name of St. Matthew. At the end of 2011, it was decided that the school would be privatized. In 2012, the High School of St. Matthew was redesigned into a non-governmental institution and its founder was the Vilkaviškis diocese.

In 1991, two kindergartens-nurseries were redesigned into Kauno Panemunės primary school-kindergarten. In 1992, the school-kindergarten was reorganized into Kauno Panemunės primary school.

In 1993, in High Panemunė, a new school was established that was called Kauno Šilo Primary School. Since the establishment of said school, all educational, expressions of creativity and spiritual development were based on Lithuanian values, virtues and heritage.

In 1987, a social care institution was established, the Kauno Panemunės Retirement Home, which was dedicated to seniors who were of retirement age and required constant care.

Also, Panemunė hosts Kaunas Municipality's Child Care Home and in 1952, a library was established in Panemunė.

1859–1860, the Panemunė Cemetery was established and many famous people like Aleksandras Stulginskis are buried there.

Panemunė's first airport was built around 1912–1913 and some hangars still remain there to this day. Around 1927–1928, the reinforced concrete bridge that connects Šančiai and Panemunė was built. There is the pride of Panemunė, the Panemunės šilas park. There are many paths to take there, that are named after various animals and birds. There is also a significant amount of resting and exercising zones.
