= Stasys Kropas =

Lithuanian politician and banker

Stasys Kropas (born 6 February 1953) is a Lithuanian politician and banker. In 1990 he was among those who signed the Act of the Re-Establishment of the State of Lithuania. Since 2008 he has been the president of the Association of Lithuanian Banks, and from 2010 until at least 2014 he was a member of the European Economic and Social Committee.
