= Aleksandras Abišala =

Lithuanian politician

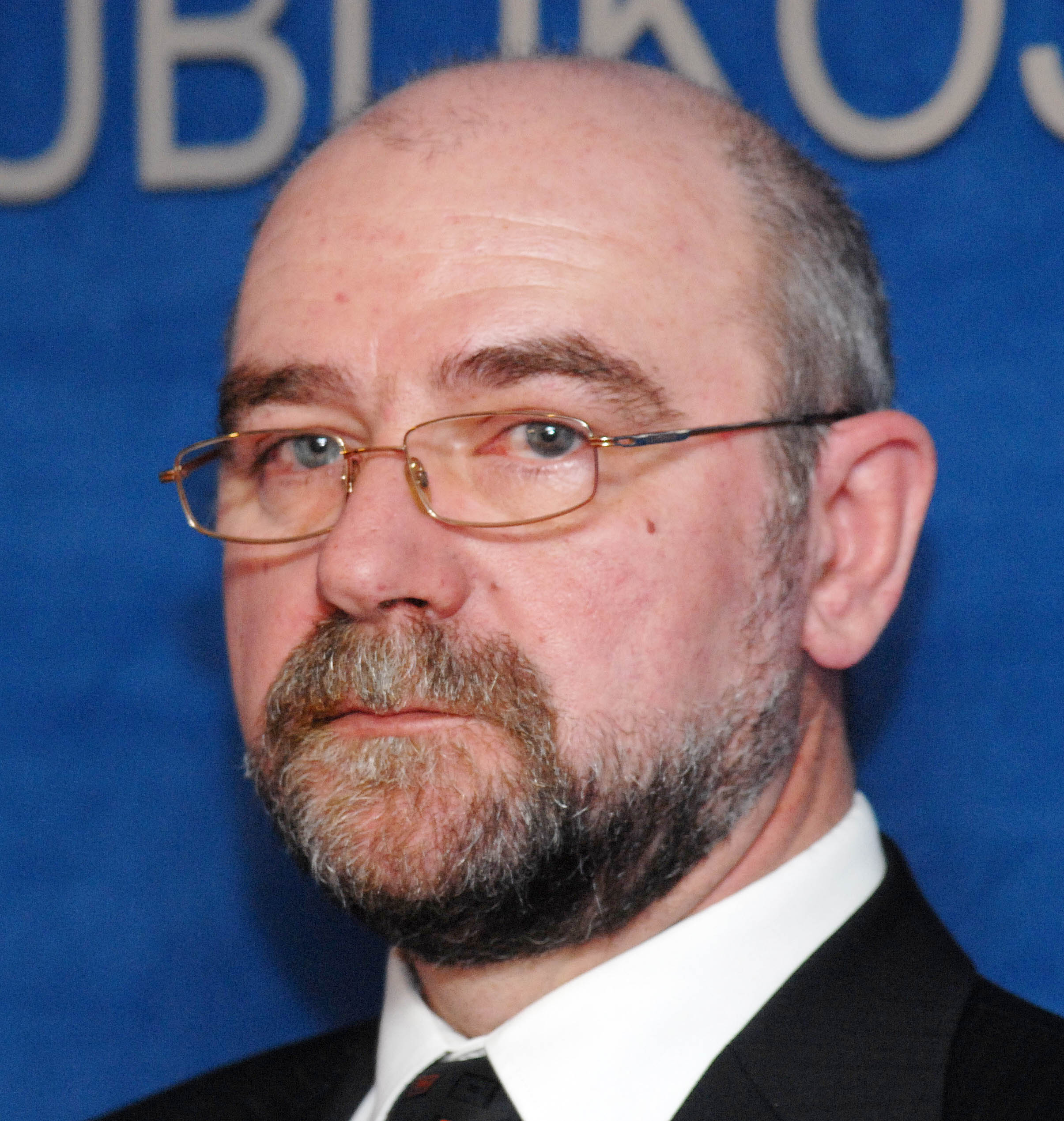
- Abišala in 2008

4th Prime Minister of Lithuania
- In office 21 July 1992 – 2 December 1992
- Preceded by: Gediminas Vagnorius
- Succeeded by: Bronislovas Lubys

Personal details
- Born: 28 December 1955 (age 70) Inta, Komi ASSR, Russian SFSR, USSR

Aleksandras Abišala (born 28 December 1955) is a former Lithuanian politician and Prime Minister of Lithuania (1992).

Abišala was born on 28 December 1955 into a family of deportees in the Komi region of the Russian Soviet Federative Socialist Republic (RSFSR).

He became one of the leaders of the Kaunas faction of the Sąjūdis movement in 1988. Abišala was elected deputy to the Lithuanian Supreme Soviet in 1990 and was one of the signatories of the 11 March declaration of independence. Until 1992, he served as minister without portfolio, then from 21 July through 2 December 1992 as prime minister.

In 2007, he established his own business consulting company called "A. Abišala and Partners".

Preceded by Gediminas Vagnorius	Prime Minister of Lithuania; 21 July 1992 – 2 December 1992	Succeeded by Bronislovas Lubys
