= Ministry of Finance (Lithuania) =

Government ministry of Lithuania

- Finansų ministerija (in Lithuanian)
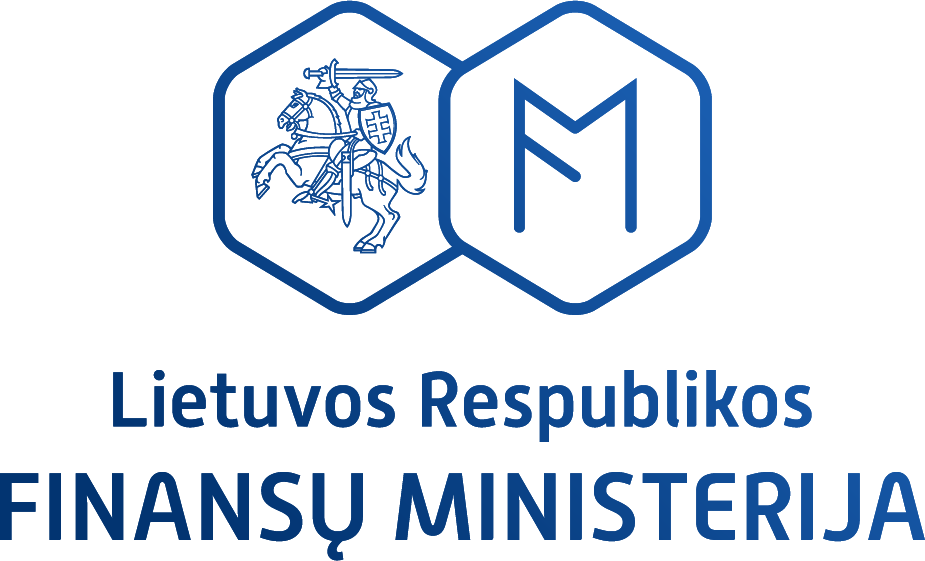

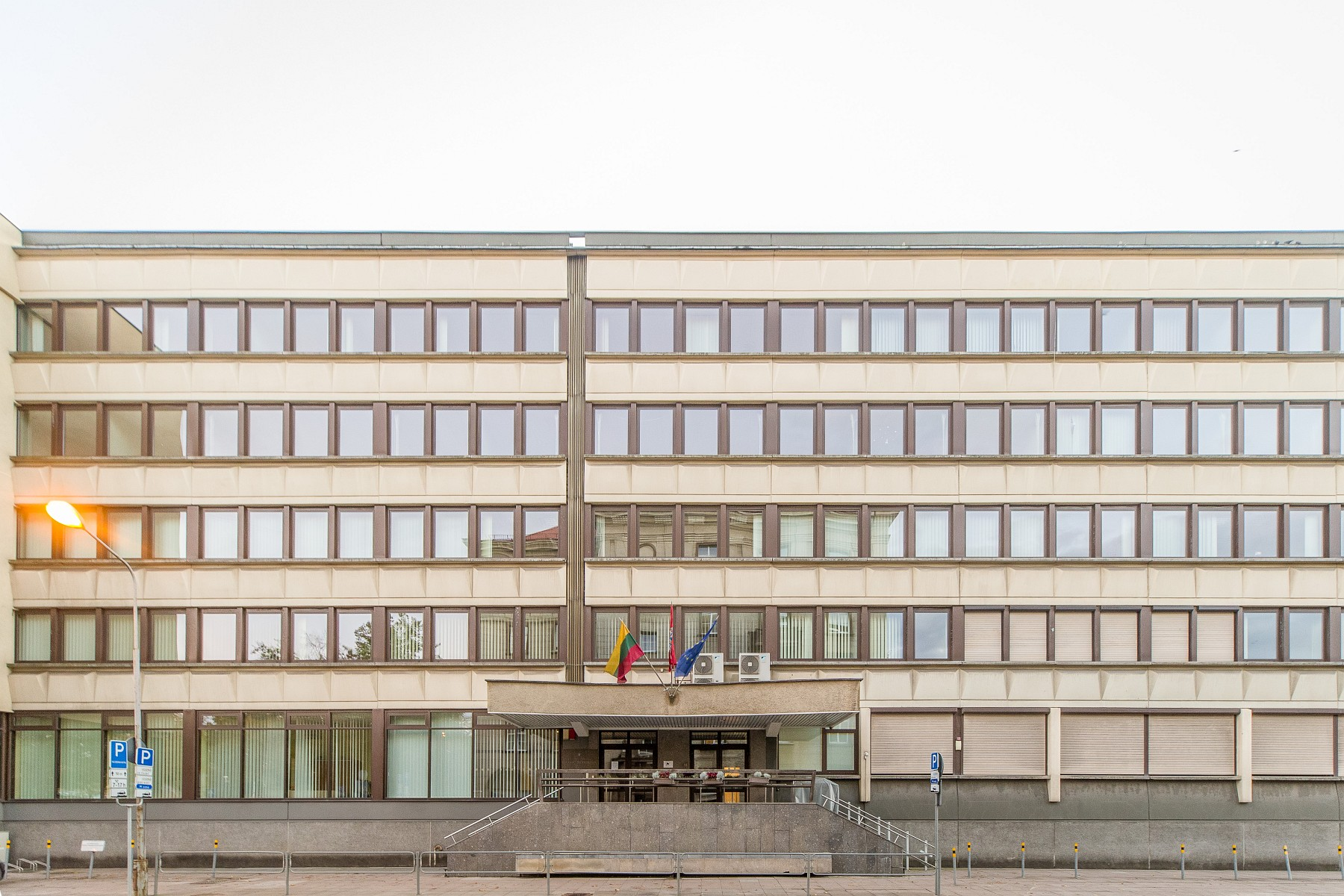

Ministry overview
- Formed: 11 November 1918; 107 years ago
- Jurisdiction: Government of Lithuania
- Headquarters: Lukiškių 2, Naujamiestis, 01108 Vilnius
- Employees: 415 permanent employees (January 2021)
- Annual budget: ▲€2.272 billion (2024)
- Minister responsible: Kristupas Vaitiekūnas, 27th Minister for Finance of Lithuania
- Website: finmin.lrv.lt

Map
- 54°41′33.8″N 25°16′4.7″E

The Ministry of Finance of the Republic of Lithuania (Lithuanian: Lietuvos Respublikos finansų ministerija) is a government department of the Republic of Lithuania. Its operations are authorized by the Constitution of the Republic of Lithuania, decrees issued by the President and Prime Minister, and laws passed by the Seimas (Parliament). Its mission is to formulate and implement an effective policy of public finance in order to ensure the country's macroeconomic stability and economic development.

== History ==
The Ministry of Finance, Trading and Industry was established on 11 November 1918. Its first minister was a prominent Lithuanian lawyer and public figure Martynas Yčas (1885–1941). For a brief period, between 25 December 1918 and 17 December 1919, there was a separate Ministry of Trading and Industry which is seen as a predecessor of the contemporary Ministry of Economy and Innovation.

== Ministers ==
Democratic Labour Party Farmers and Greens Union Homeland Union Social Democratic Party Independent

Ministry of Finance
Term	Minister	Party	Cabinet	Office		
Term	Minister	Party	Cabinet	Start date	End date	Time in office
1	Romualdas Sikorskis (1926–1997)	Independent	Prunskienė	17 January 1990	10 January 1991	358 days
2	Romualdas Sikorskis (1926–1997)	Independent	Šimėnas	10 January 1991	13 January 1991	3 days
3	Elvyra Janina Kunevičienė (born 1939)	Homeland Union	Vagnorius	13 January 1991	21 July 1992	1 year, 190 days
4	Audrius Misevičius (born 1959)	Independent	Abišala	21 July 1992	17 December 1992	149 days
5	Eduardas Vilkelis (1953–2023)	Independent	Lubys	17 December 1992	31 March 1993	104 days
6	Eduardas Vilkelis (1953–2023)	Independent	Šleževičius	31 March 1993	10 February 1995	1 year, 316 days
7	Vytautas Einoris (1930–2019)	Democratic Labour Party	Šleževičius	10 February 1995	19 March 1996	1 year, 38 days
8	Algimantas Križinauskas (born 1958)	Independent	Stankevičius	19 March 1996	10 December 1996	266 days
9	Rolandas Matiliauskas (born 1967)	Independent	Vagnorius	10 December 1996	3 February 1997	55 days
10	Algirdas Šemeta (born 1962)	Independent	Vagnorius	19 February 1997	10 June 1999	2 years, 111 days
11	Jonas Lionginas (born 1956)	Independent	Paksas	10 June 1999	11 November 1999	154 days
12	Vytautas Dudėnas (born 1937)	Homeland Union	Kubilius	11 November 1999	9 November 2000	365 days
13	Jonas Lionginas (born 1956)	Independent	Paksas	9 November 2000	12 July 2001	245 days
14	Dalia Grybauskaitė (born 1956)	Independent	Brazauskas	12 July 2001	30 April 2004	2 years, 293 days
15	Algirdas Butkevičius (born 1958)	Social Democratic Party	Brazauskas	4 May 2004	14 December 2004	224 days
16	Algirdas Butkevičius (born 1958)	Social Democratic Party	Brazauskas	14 December 2004	14 May 2005	151 days
17	Zigmantas Balčytis (born 1953)	Social Democratic Party	Brazauskas	18 July 2005	18 July 2006	1 year, 0 days
18	Zigmantas Balčytis (born 1953)	Social Democratic Party	Kirkilas	18 July 2006	16 May 2007	302 days
19	Rimantas Šadžius (born 1960)	Social Democratic Party	Kirkilas	16 May 2007	9 December 2008	1 year, 207 days
20	Algirdas Šemeta (born 1962)	Independent	Kubilius	9 December 2008	30 June 2009	203 days
21	Ingrida Šimonytė (born 1974)	Independent	Kubilius	3 July 2009	13 December 2012	3 years, 163 days
22	Rimantas Šadžius (born 1960)	Social Democratic Party	Butkevičius	13 December 2012	15 June 2016	3 years, 185 days
23	Rasa Budbergytė (born 1960)	Social Democratic Party	Butkevičius	23 June 2016	13 December 2016	173 days
24	Vilius Šapoka (born 1978)	Farmers and Greens Union	Skvernelis	13 December 2016	11 December 2020	3 years, 364 days
25	Gintarė Skaistė (born 1981)	Homeland Union	Šimonytė	11 December 2020	12 December 2024	4 years, 1 day
26	Rimantas Šadžius (born 1960)	Social Democratic Party	Paluckas	12 December 2024	4 August 2025	235 days
27	Kristupas Vaitiekūnas (born 1983)	Social Democratic Party	Ruginienė	25 September 2025	Incumbent	317 days
