= Gediminas Šerkšnys =

Lithuanian politician (born 1948)

Gediminas Šerkšnys (born 11 February 1948) is a Lithuanian politician. In 1990 he was among those who signed the Act of the Re-Establishment of the State of Lithuania.

Seimas
New constituency	Member of the Seimas for Girstupis; 1990-1992	Succeeded by Kęstutis Povilas Paukštys (Pramonės constituency)
