= Adolfas Šleževičius =

Lithuanian politician (1948–2022)

6th Prime Minister of Lithuania
- In office 10 March 1993 – 8 February 1996
- President: Algirdas Brazauskas
- Preceded by: Bronislovas Lubys
- Succeeded by: Laurynas Mindaugas Stankevičius

Personal details
- Born: 2 February 1948 Šiauliai District Municipality
- Died: 6 December 2022 (aged 74) Ignalina District Municipality, Lithuania
- Resting place: Antakalnis Cemetery

Adolfas Šleževičius (2 February 1948 – 6 December 2022) was a Lithuanian politician who served as Prime Minister from 1993 to 1996.

Previously a manager in a state dairy company, Šleževičius was appointed prime minister following the election of Algirdas Brazauskas as president in February 1993. At the time, Lithuania was faced with monthly inflation of 10–30% despite the demonetization of the ruble and introduction of the talonas (coupon money) on 1 October 1992. After initially promising large wage hikes to state workers, Šleževičius implemented a smaller increase and backed a tightening of monetary policy by the Bank of Lithuania. This brought monthly inflation down from 25% in May 1993 to 13% in May, 6% in June, and 3% in July. With this progress in stabilization, the Litas Committee (composed of Šleževičius, President Brazauskas, and Bank of Lithuania President Visokavičius) announced the reintroduction of the Lithuanian litas as the national currency, to take place on 25 June 1993. The exchange rate strengthened from the equivalent of over 5 litai to 3.5 litai by August 1993.

In October 1993, Šleževičius announced that the value of the litas would be fixed in a manner similar to that of the Estonian kroon, that is, in a currency board arrangement with a fixed parity. The litas Stability Law (Law I-407) was enacted on 23 March 1994, and the exchange rate fixed at 3.9 litai per U.S. dollar on 1 April 1994. The fixing of the exchange rate contributed to large capital inflows from abroad, which helped to finance the modernization of the economy in the years to follow.

He was forced to resign on 8 February 1996, after a vote of no confidence in the Seimas following charges of corruption. Šleževičius had withdrawn his assets at the last minute from two banks that collapsed. He faced criminal charges regarding corruption and forgery, but after four years of investigation, the case was dismissed before reaching a court. After his abortive political career, Šleževičius turned to private business.

Šleževičius died on 6 December 2022, at the age of 74.

Political offices
| Preceded by Bronislovas Lubys | Prime Minister of Lithuania; 10 March 1993 – 15 February 1996 | Succeeded by Laurynas Mindaugas Stankevičius |
