= Bronislovas Lubys =

Lithuanian politician and businessman (1938–2011)

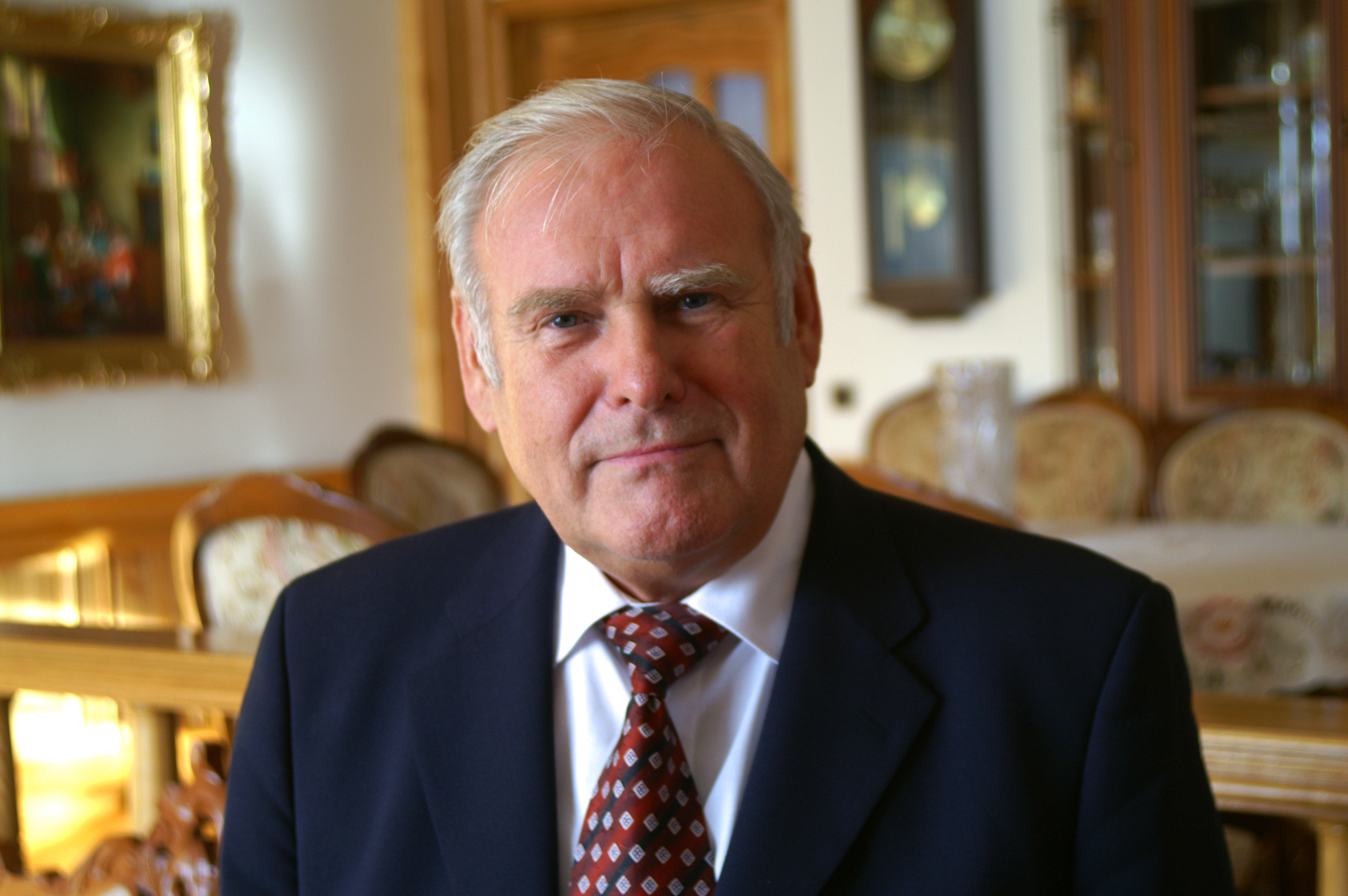
- Lubys in 2005

5th Prime Minister of Lithuania
- In office 12 December 1992 – 10 March 1993
- Preceded by: Aleksandras Abišala
- Succeeded by: Adolfas Šleževičius

Personal details
- Born: 8 October 1938 Plungė, Lithuania
- Died: 23 October 2011 (aged 73) Druskininkai, Lithuania
- Occupation: Businessman

Bronislovas Lubys (8 October 1938 – 23 October 2011) was a Lithuanian entrepreneur, former Prime Minister of Lithuania, signatory of the Act of the Re-Establishment of the State of Lithuania, and businessman.

Lubys was born in Plungė. He was CEO and main shareholder of the Lithuanian company Achema. As of August 2008, he was the richest Lithuanian, according to the Lithuanian magazine Veidas.

Lubys died of a heart attack while riding a bicycle in Druskininkai on 23 October 2011.

Preceded by Aleksandras Abišala	Prime Minister of Lithuania; 12 December 1992 – 10 March 1993	Succeeded by Adolfas Šleževičius
