= Ingrida Šimonytė =

Prime Minister of Lithuania from 2020 to 2024

Ingrida Šimonytė MP
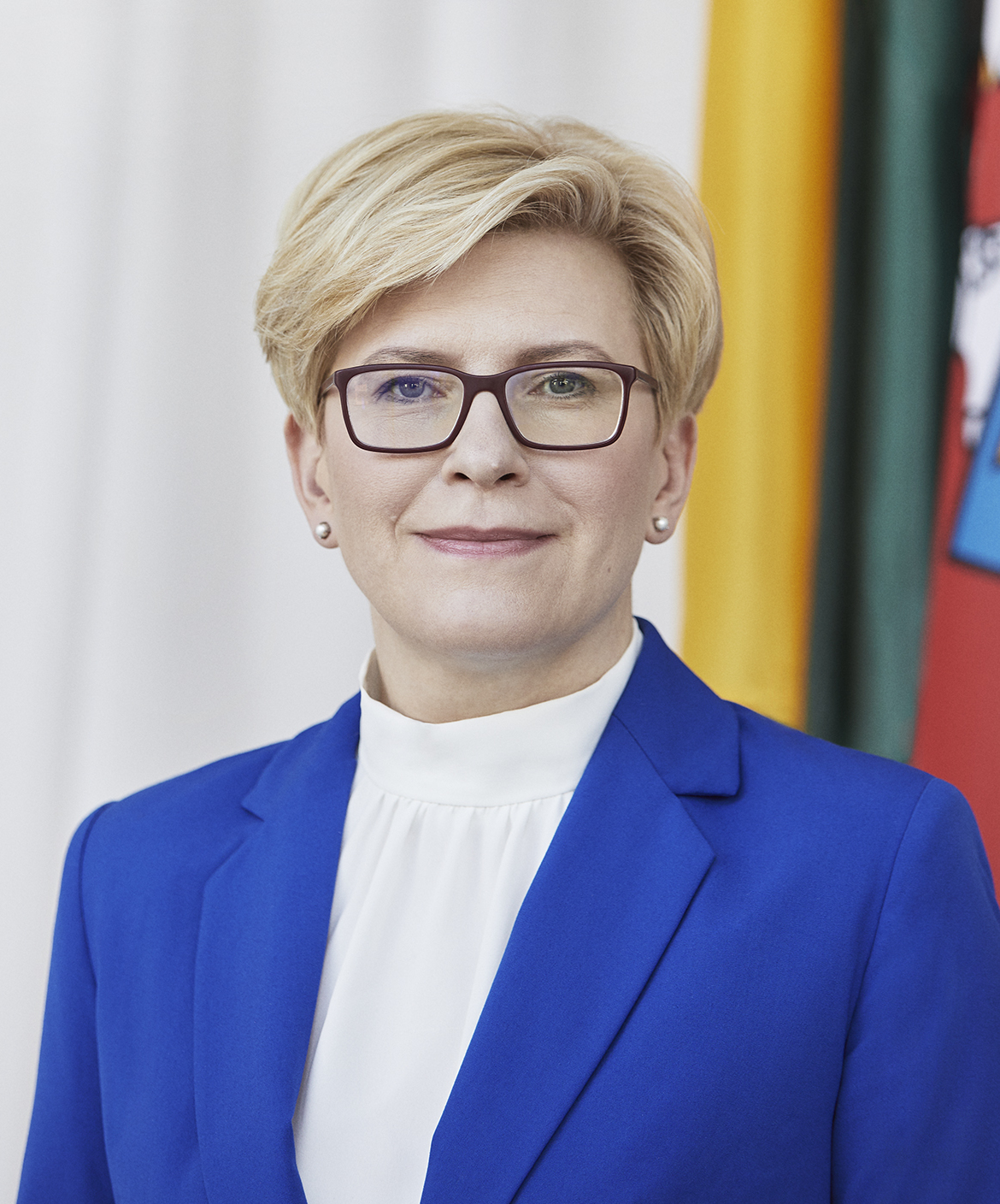
- Šimonytė in 2019

17th Prime Minister of Lithuania
- In office 11 December 2020 – 12 December 2024
- President: Gitanas Nausėda
- Preceded by: Saulius Skvernelis
- Succeeded by: Gintautas Paluckas

Member of the Seimas
- Incumbent
- Assumed office 14 November 2016
- Preceded by: Andrius Kubilius
- Constituency: Antakalnis

Deputy Chair of the Board of the Bank of Lithuania
- In office 10 July 2013 – 31 October 2016
- President: Vitas Vasiliauskas
- Preceded by: Darius Petrauskas
- Succeeded by: Raimondas Kuodis

Minister of Finance
- In office 7 July 2009 – 13 December 2012
- Prime Minister: Andrius Kubilius
- Preceded by: Algirdas Šemeta
- Succeeded by: Rimantas Šadžius

Leader of the Opposition
- Incumbent
- Assumed office 14 November 2024
- Preceded by: Viktorija Čmilytė-Nielsen

Personal details
- Born: 15 November 1974 (age 51) Vilnius, then part of Lithuanian SSR, Soviet Union
- Party: Homeland Union (2022–present); Independent (until 2022)
- Education: Vilnius University (BA, MA)
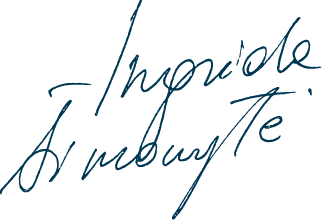
- Signature

Ingrida Šimonytė (Lithuanian: [ɪŋʲɡʲrʲɪˈdˠɐ ʃʲɪmˠoːˈnʲîːtʲeː]; born 15 November 1974) is a Lithuanian politician, public servant, and economist who served as the 17th prime minister of Lithuania from 2020 to 2024. She has been a Member of the Seimas for the Antakalnis constituency since 2016 and was Minister of Finance in the second Kubilius cabinet from 2009 until 2012. Šimonytė was a candidate in the 2019 and 2024 presidential elections, but lost both times to Gitanas Nausėda in the second round. She has been a member of Homeland Union since 2022, having previously been an independent politician.

Born in Vilnius, Šimonytė graduated from Vilnius University with a degree in business in 1996, later receiving a master's degree in 1998. She began her career as an economist and public servant, working as chief of the tax division within the Ministry of Finance until 2004. She remained in the tax division until being nominated to serve as finance minister in 2009, tasked with stimulating the Lithuanian economy in the aftermath of the Great Recession. She resigned from the position in 2012, and was appointed deputy chairperson of the Board of the Bank of Lithuania, and chairperson of Vilnius University Council, a professor of economics at the Vilnius University Institute of International Relations and Political Science, and of public finance at ISM University of Management and Economics.

Šimonytė returned to politics in 2016, when she ran as an independent candidate in the 2016 parliamentary election to represent Antakalnis constituency in Vilnius, ultimately winning a seat in parliament. In 2018, Šimonytė announced her campaign in the 2019 presidential election; she won the nomination of the Homeland Union. She narrowly won the first round of the election on 12 May 2019, before placing 33 percentage points behind fellow independent Gitanas Nausėda in the runoff on 26 May.

She was reelected to Parliament in the 2020 parliamentary election, where the Homeland Union won a plurality of seats. Following the certification of the election results, Šimonytė was proposed as the prime ministerial candidate by a coalition consisting of the Homeland Union, Liberal Movement and Freedom Party; she took office on 11 December, along with the appointment of her cabinet. In October 2023, Šimonytė announced that she would once again run for president in the 2024 presidential election. She made it to the runoff but lost again to Nausėda in a landslide receiving 24% of the vote against Nausėda's 76%. She left as prime minister after her party lost to the Social Democratic Party of Lithuania in the 2024 Lithuanian parliamentary election in October.

== Early life and education ==
Šimonytė was born 15 November 1974 in Vilnius to a father who worked as a civil engineer, and a mother, Danutė Šimonienė, who worked as an economist. She moved to the Antakalnis district of Vilnius with her parents in 1984, where she spent most of her childhood and formative years. In 1992, Šimonytė graduated from the Vilnius Žirmūnai Gymnasium, where she was recognised and awarded for her academic skills in mathematics.

After graduating, she enrolled in the Faculty of Economics at Vilnius University, graduating with a degree in business administration in 1996. She subsequently returned to the institution, and received a master's degree in economics in 1998.

== Political career ==
=== Early career ===
In 1997, Šimonytė first began working professionally as an economist and public servant, after being hired at the Ministry of Finance within its tax division. Between 1998 and 2001, Šimonytė worked as an economist in the ministry's tax and sales division, and later was promoted to head of the ministry's direct taxation division, a position she remained in until 2004, when she became chancellor of the ministry, and later deputy finance minister. She resigned from this position in 2009, to take office as finance minister.

=== Minister of Finance ===
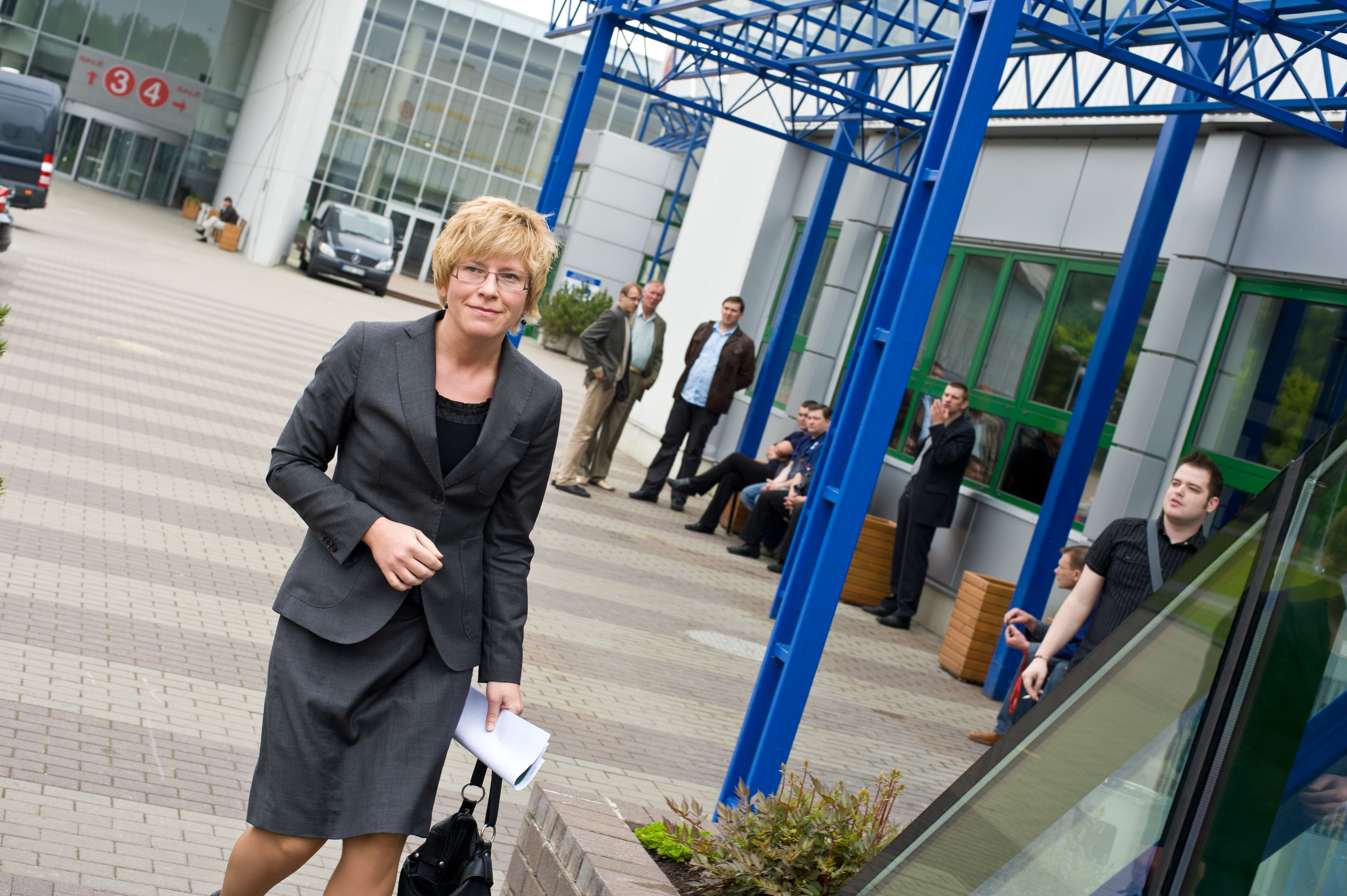
Šimonytė at the 2010 Baltic Development Forum in Vilnius.

In 2009, Šimonytė was nominated to serve as finance minister in the second cabinet of prime minister Andrius Kubilius, replacing Algirdas Šemeta who had stepped down to become European Commissioner for Budget and Administration. Following her nomination, she was appointed by President Valdas Adamkus to serve in the office. Upon taking office, Šimonytė was tasked with recovering the Lithuanian economy in the aftermath of the Great Recession, with Lithuania's gross domestic product (GDP) having dipped 14.7% in 2009. While in the position, Šimonytė became one of the faces of the austerity drive implemented by the government in order to improve the Lithuanian economy.

Šimonytė stepped down from her position as finance minister after the 2012 parliamentary election, where the incumbent government suffered defeat at the hands of the Lithuanian Social Democratic Party and the incoming government of Algirdas Butkevičius. Following her resignation, Šimonytė was appointed to serve as deputy chairperson of the board of the Bank of Lithuania, a role she remained in until 2016, while also becoming a lecturer of economics at the Vilnius University Institute of International Relations and Political Science, and of public finance at ISM University of Management and Economics.

=== Parliamentary career ===
In 2015, Šimonytė planned her return to politics after confirming her intention to stand as a candidate in the 2016 parliamentary election, aiming to represent the Antakalnis constituency within Vilnius. The seat had been held by former prime minister Andrius Kubilius, who opted not to run for reelection in the constituency. Considered to be a safe seat for the Homeland Union, Šimonytė ran as an independent candidate, but received electoral assistance from the Homeland Union. In the election, Šimonytė was one of only three constituency candidates nationwide to win their elections without having to advance to a second round run-off election, having won 51.54% of the electorate within her constituency in the first round. Following her win, she took her seat in the Seimas.

After her election to the Seimas, Šimonytė joined the parliamentary group of the Homeland Union, despite being officially an independent politician. She was appointed to serve as the chairperson of the audit committee, while also serving on the European affairs committee.

==== 2019 presidential election ====
In 2018, Šimonytė announced her campaign for president of Lithuania in the 2019 presidential election. Standing as an independent candidate, Šimonytė sought the nomination of the Homeland Union political party, facing only Vygaudas Ušackas for the nomination. She ultimately won the nomination, receiving 79% of the vote.

Going into the election as the Homeland Union candidate, Šimonytė was one of the favourites to win, continuously polling in a near-deadlocked tie for first with independent candidate Gitanas Nausėda. The first round of the election was held on 12 May 2019, where Šimonytė narrowly placed first with 31.53% of the vote, ahead of Nausėda's 31.16%. The two subsequently advanced to a run-off election on 26 May, where Šimonytė was defeated by Nausėda after receiving only 33.47% of the vote; she had received fewer overall votes cast for her in the second round than she did in the first round, having received about 3,200 fewer votes, compared to Nausėda having received more than 400,000 more votes than he received in the first round.

== Prime Minister of Lithuania (2020–2024) ==
=== 2020 election ===
Following the 2019 presidential election, Šimonytė had emerged as an unofficial leader of the Homeland Union and one of the most prominent politicians affiliated with the party, despite being officially an independent. She stood for reelection to the Seimas in the 2020 parliamentary election, where she once again became one of only three constituency candidates nationwide to win their elections in the first round, this time having received more than 60% of the vote. Following the certification of the election results, it emerged that the Homeland Union had won a plurality of seats, overtaking the incumbent government led by the Lithuanian Farmers and Greens Union.

After the election a coalition was expected to be formed between the Homeland Union, the Liberal Movement, and the Freedom Party, with all three parties proposing Šimonytė to serve as prime minister. If confirmed, the government would be led by three women: Šimonytė, Liberal Movement leader Viktorija Čmilytė, and Freedom Party leader Aušrinė Armonaitė, following in the footsteps of the Marin Cabinet in Finland.

On 9 November, the coalition agreement was signed between the Homeland Union, Liberal Movement, and Freedom Party, paving the way for Šimonytė to become prime minister. On 18 November, she announced the proposed makeup of her cabinet. Šimonytė was appointed prime minister on 11 December 2020 by President Gitanas Nausėda, becoming the second woman to serve in the role, following Kazimira Prunskienė.

=== 2024 elections ===
In October 2023, Šimonytė announced that she would once again run for president in the 2024 presidential election, but lost again to incumbent President Nausėda.

Šimonytė's term as prime minister ended following her party's defeat to the Social Democratic Party of Lithuania in the 2024 Lithuanian parliamentary election in October.

=== Domestic policy ===
==== COVID-19 pandemic ====
The government of Saulius Skvernelis held its last meeting on 9 December 2020, before the new cabinet is expected to assume office on Friday. Then, PM-designate Šimonytė urged the outgoing government to step up coronavirus measures.

Šimonytė's cabinet was sworn in and started working on 11 December 2020, when the number of cases reached 3067. Two days later, restrictions were put in place.

The vaccination program began on 27 December 2020, as in the rest of the European Union. The first to receive the vaccine were healthcare professionals working with COVID-19 patients.

On 4 January, Lithuanian government confirmed backlog of 293 deaths that were previously unaccounted in statistic.

From 15 February, partial lifting of lockdown was made, including decision to re-open small shops and beauty salons. Later, wearing face masks no longer required outdoors.

On 17 March Health Minister Arūnas Dulkys suspended the use of vaccine produced by British-Swedish company AstraZeneca. On 18 March the European Medicines Agency said the AstraZeneca vaccine is safe. On 22 March 2021, Šimonytė, Speaker of the Seimas Viktorija Čmilytė-Nielsen, and Health Minister Arūnas Dulkys also received the same vaccine.

==== Portfolio of strategic works (projects) ====
Based on the priority works of the Government's program, the portfolio of the Prime Minister's strategic projects has been compiled. The following five strategic works (projects) have been published in the Prime Minister's portfolio of strategic works (projects) as part of the reforms of the government term:

- restructurization of the civil service;
- educational program "Millennium Schools";
- EDtech digital transformation of education;
- creation of innovation ecosystems in science centers, innovation agencies and mission-based science and business innovation programs;
- creation of a long-term care service delivery model.

The Prime Minister's portfolio of strategic works (projects) also includes the commitment of the implementation plan of the Eighteenth Government Program to prepare the State Progress Strategy "Lithuania 2050" and seven more strategic works (projects) of public management, education and strategic infrastructure:

- Review of functions and optimal network of institutions (public management system).
- Public and administrative services (including their quality assurance in the regions).
- Financial planning of the government sector is oriented towards strategic goals.
- Sustainable interaction between culture and education (inclusion of culture and creativity in education).
- An effective system for increasing resilience to threats, crisis and emergency management.
- Secure electrical energy system (synchronization of the electrical energy system with the West and the blockade of the Astravo nuclear power plant).
- Development of strategic rail and road transport connections.

=== Foreign policy ===
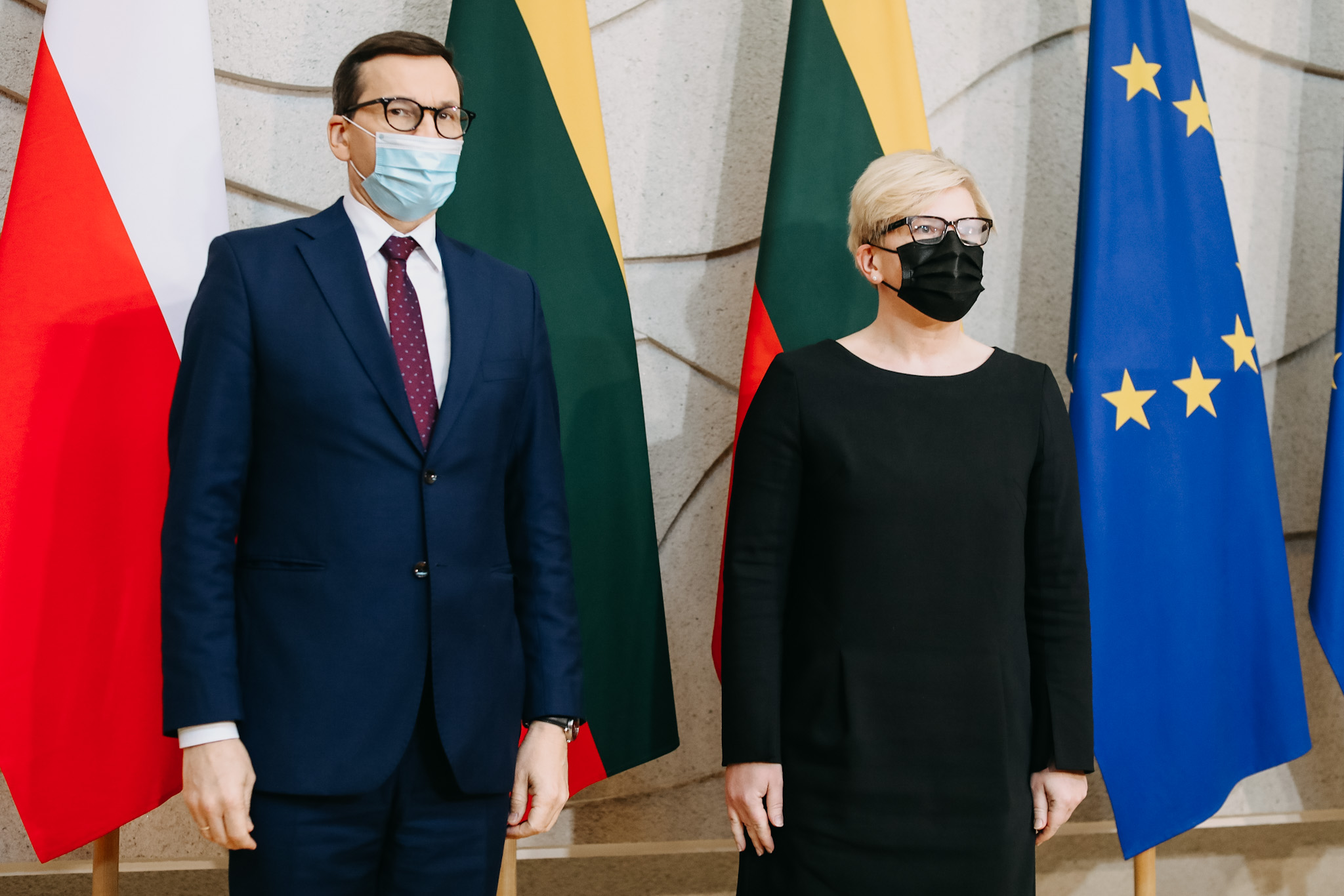
Šimonytė meets with Polish Prime Minister Mateusz Morawiecki in Vilnius, 21 November 2021

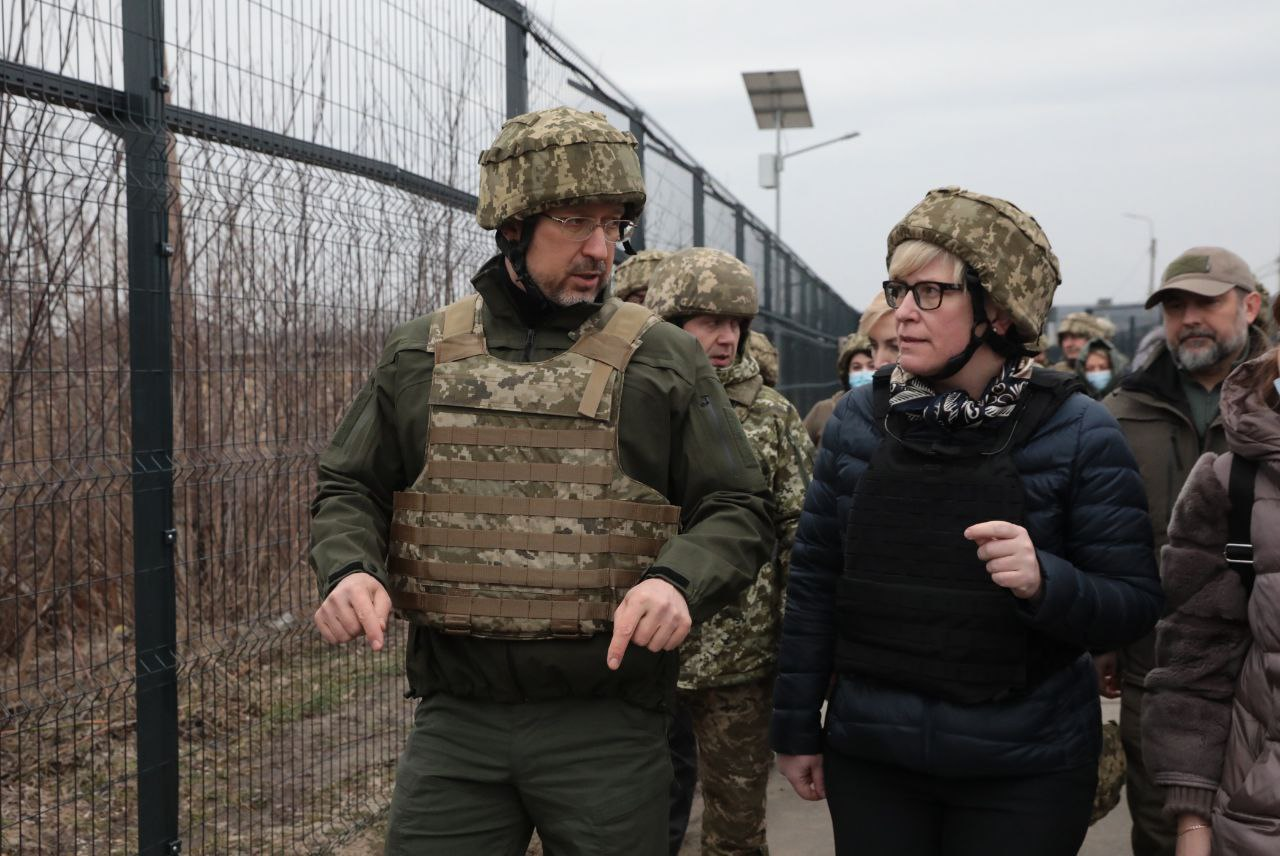
Šimonytė and Ukrainian Prime Minister Denys Shmyhal visited the Luhansk Oblast on 11 February 2022.

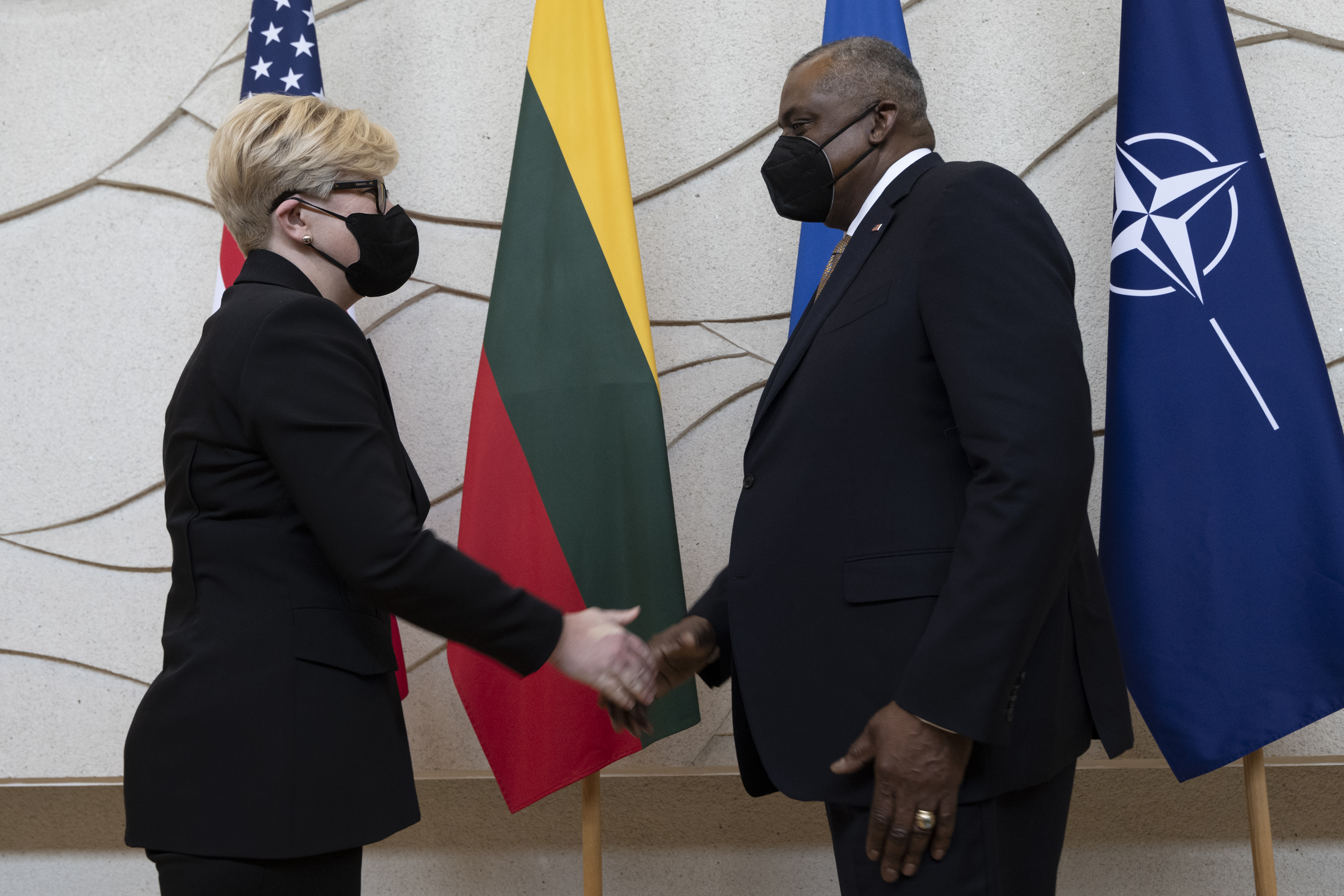
Šimonytė meets with US Secretary of Defense Lloyd Austin in February 2022

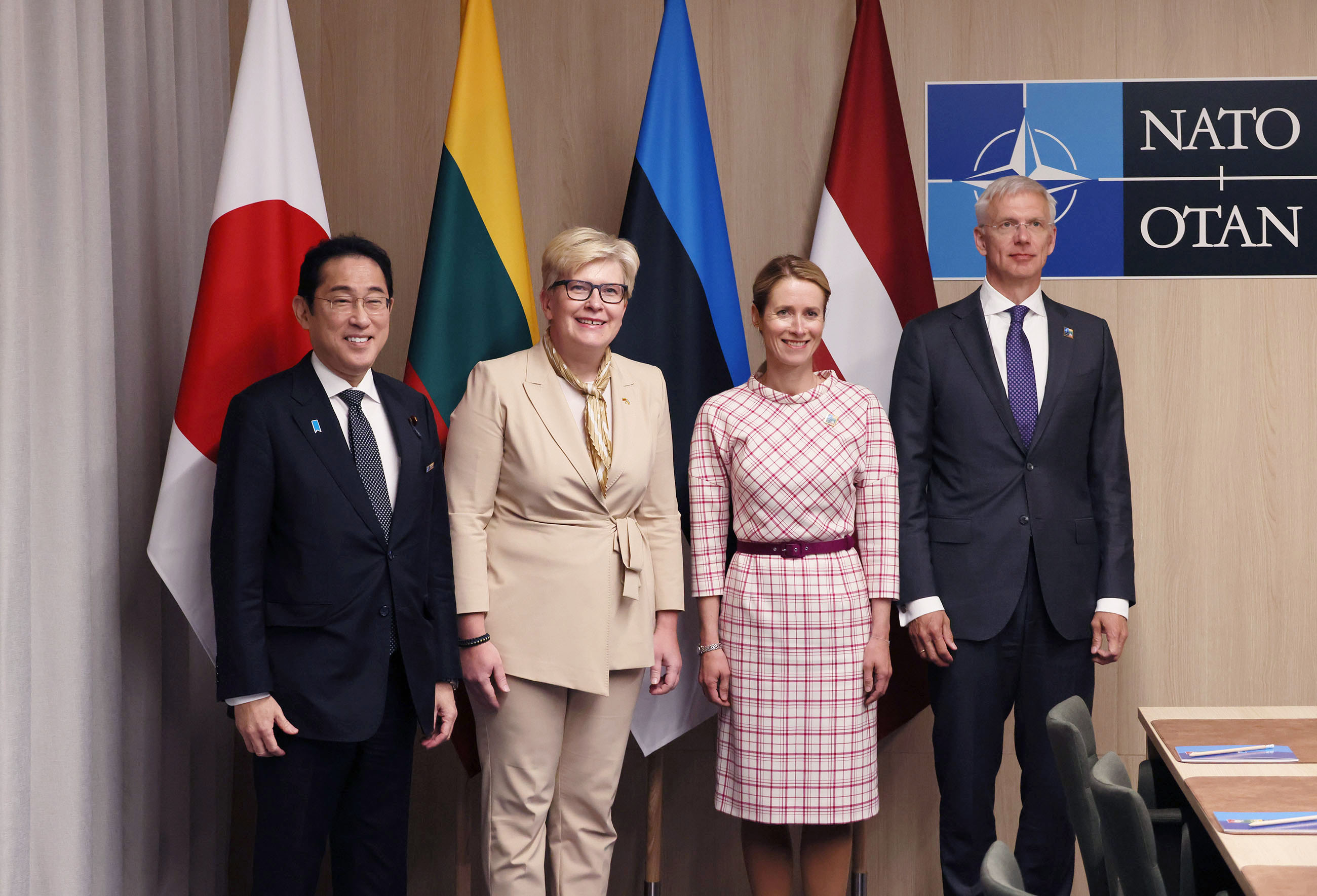
Šimonytė meets with Estonian Prime Minister Kaja Kallas, Latvian Prime Minister Krišjānis Kariņš and Japanese Prime Minister Fumio Kishida in July 2023

==== Baltic States ====
On 1 January 2021, Šimonytė took over the presidency of the Baltic Council of Ministers for a term of one year.

==== Belarus ====
During a meeting with Sviatlana Tsikhanouskaya, Šimonytė emphasized that Lithuania seeks to further increase pressure on the Belarusian regime. Lithuania also supports the expansion of EU sanctions. During the meeting, the prime minister said:

<...> Release of political prisoners, end of repression, and free and democratic elections are the key steps that Belarusians are demanding. Lithuania and the entire democratic world demand the same.

==== China and Taiwan ====
Following the opening of the Taiwanese Representative Office in Lithuania in 2021 which resulted in China downgrading its relations with Lithuania, Šimonytė stated in an April 2022 interview with The Economist that Lithuania does not regret the decision to strengthen its ties with Taiwan. She described relationship between Taiwan and Lithuania as "vibrant and productive," emphasizing that it was a sovereign decision by Lithuania to enhance its connections with Taiwanese businesses and universities. In an October 2022 interview with Nikkei Asia, she stated that Lithuania's ties with Taiwan can contribute to significant development in industrial fields such as semiconductors and lasers.

=== Visits ===
==== International trips ====
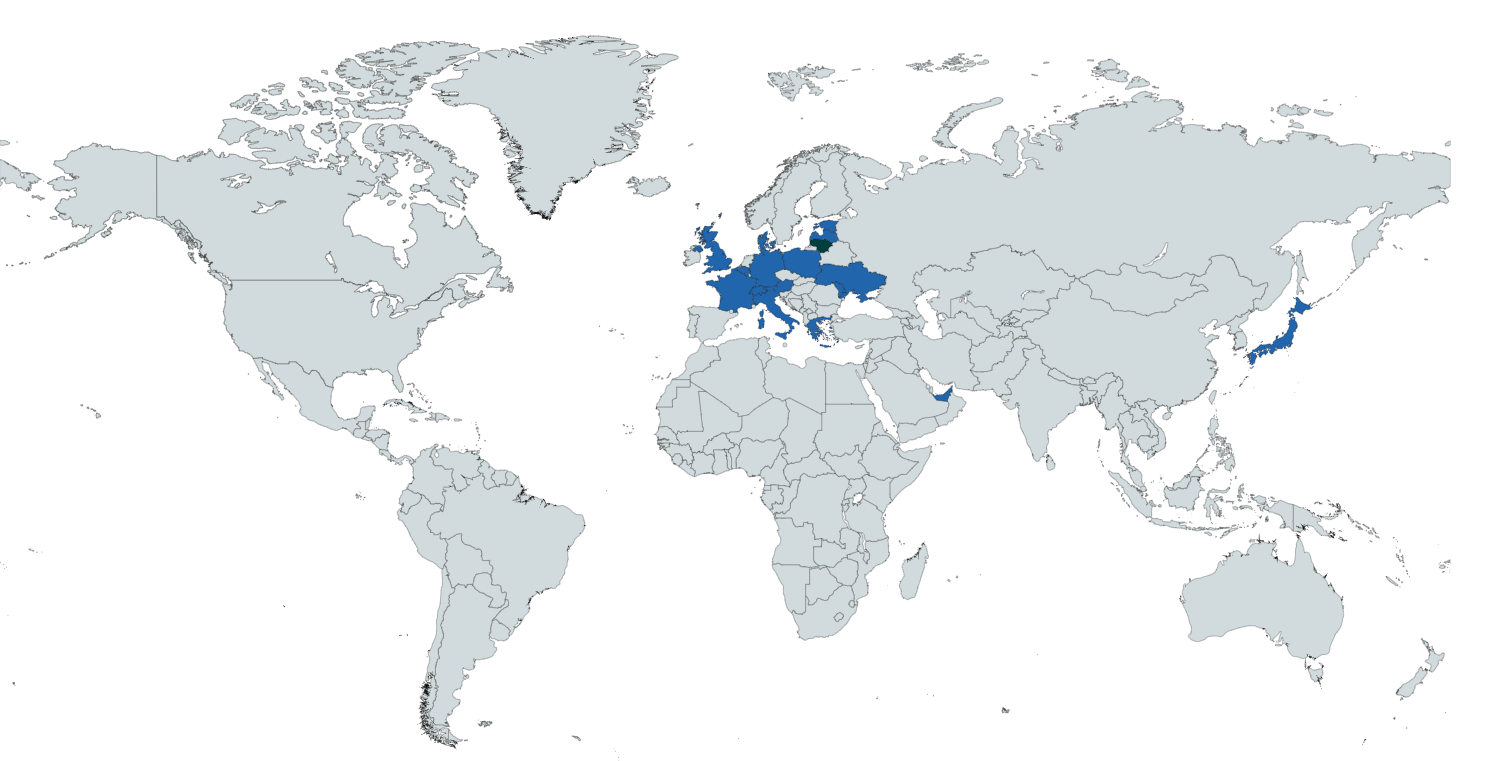
Countries visited by Šimonytė as of November 2021

2021

- 3 June 2021: European Union NATO (Brussels), Šimonytė met with Charles Michel, President of the European Council, Ursula von der Leyen, President of the European Commission, Manfred Weber, President of the European People's Party Group in the European Parliament, Jens Stoltenberg, Secretary General of NATO, and David Sassoli, President of the European Parliament.
- 11–12 June 2021: Austria, Šimonytė met with Sebastian Kurz, Chancellor of Austria and discussed the management of the COVID-19 pandemic, the situation in Russia and Belarus, bilateral relations, the European agenda, the Eastern Partnership program, the aspirations of the Western Balkans for integration into the European Union, and the unsafe Astravets Nuclear Power Plant. Also Šimonytė met with Wolfgang Sobotka, President of the National Council, the Lithuanian community in Austria and attended the 25th Europa-Forum Wachau, where she delivered a speech.
- 17–18 June 2021: Latvia (Riga), Šimonytė made an official visit to the Republic of Latvia and met with Egils Levits, President of Latvia, Ināra Mūrniece, Speaker of the Saeima, Krišjānis Kariņš, Prime Minister of Latvia. The meetings focused on the development of strategic bilateral relations, the EU-NATO agendas, the management of the COVID-19 pandemic and the facilitation of travel for citizens. The unsafe threat of the Astravets NPP to all EU citizens, the implementation of strategic transport and energy projects were also discussed. Furthermore, the meetings focused on a unified response to the aggressive actions of Belarus and Russia, support for Ukraine, the strengthening of the Eastern Partnership initiative, and the challenges posed by China. The Prime Minister paid tribute to those who died for the freedom of Latvia and the victims of the Latvian occupation - laid flowers at the Freedom Monument in Riga, paid tribute to the memory of the victims of the Soviet occupation at the Memorial of the Museum of the Occupation of Latvia. During the visit, she also visited the Riga Lithuanian Secondary School and met with the Lithuanian community in Latvia.
- 1–2 July 2021: Estonia (Tallinn), the PM made an official visit to the Republic of Estonia. The visit agenda included meetings with prime minister of Estonia Kaja Kallas and Speaker of the Riigikogu Jüri Ratas. The meetings covered such items as possibilities of strengthening the bilateral relations and economic cooperation, coordination of national positions before important EU-NATO meetings, support for the Eastern Partnership countries, the security situation in the region, and Belarusian regime's weaponised illegal migration. She intends to raise the issue of the unsafe Astravyets NPP, and discussed the strategic energy and transport projects, and pandemic management. The prime minister Šimonytė also paid tribute to the victims of communism by laying flowers at the Memorial and met with the local Lithuanian community.
- 14–15 July 2021: Greece (Athens), Šimonytė met with prime minister of Greece Kyriakos Mitsotakis, Speaker of the Hellenic Parliament Konstantinos Tasoulas, also she visited Operations Center of the Hellenic Coast Guard. The meetings focused on Greece's experience in managing illegal migration, discussed possible Greek expert support and training of Lithuanian officials in the implementation of asylum procedures in Lithuania, and also discussed were bilateral relations and opportunities for strengthening economic cooperation.
- 2–3 September 2021: Italy Vatican Sovereign Military Order of Malta (Rome, Vatican), PM Šimonytė met with prime minister of Italy Mario Draghi in Rome and discussed the strengthening of bilateral relations and economic cooperation, security, the situation in Afghanistan, Belarus and Russia, also the European Union's relations with China. The prime ministers focused on the irregular migration and the situation on the Lithuania-Belarus border. Together they also stressed the need to strengthen the transatlantic relations, discussed the possibilities of strengthening the bilateral relations, while particularly focusing on economic cooperation. EU challenges of illegal migration were also on the meeting agenda. The counterparts agreed that both Lithuania and Italy are strong supporters of European integration and that they care about the future of the EU, which should build on the principles of solidarity and strong European values. The situation in Afghanistan was also discussed at large, including the evacuation of Afghans who had helped Lithuania and Italy, the security situation in the country, the importance of the efforts of the international community in preventing a possible humanitarian crisis in Afghanistan. The prime ministers of Lithuania and Italy also discussed the prospects for EU-China relations. PM Šimonytė noted that talks with China should take place in non-divisive for Europe formats. As part of her visit to Italy, the prime minister of Lithuania met also with the senior management of Italian life sciences companies and Lithuanian community in Italy. At the Galleria Nazionale d'Arte Moderna, the PM of Lithuania visited an exhibition of works by Antonietta Raphaël Mafai, a well-known Litvak artist.
  As part of the visit to Italy, prime minister Ingrida Šimonytė met with Pope Francis in Vatican. This was the first meeting between the prime minister and the Pope. The prime minister thanked the Pope for his consistent attention to Lithuania and its people. PM Šimonytė also expressed support for the activities of the Holy See and of the Pope aimed at promoting peace in the world, advocating for greater respect for women, protection of the environment, and the principles of human dignity. Lithuania supports the actions of the Holy See in Ukraine, therefore, on behalf of Lithuania, the prime minister handed over 10 000 euros to the Pope for Ukraine Foundation. After the meeting with Pope Francis, she met with the Secretary of State of Holy See Cardinal Pietro Parolin and with Secretary for Relations with States of Holy See the Archbishop Paul Richard Gallagher to discuss the bilateral relations and international policy.
  PM Šimonytė also met with Grand Chancellor of the Order of Malta Albrecht Freiherri von Boeselager in Rome to discuss the bilateral relations and the activities of the Order in Lithuania. The meeting also covered irregular migration across the Lithuania-Belarus border and the activities of the Order of Malta in this regard.
- 9 September 2021: Germany (Berlin), PM Šimonytė met with Chancellor of Austria Sebastian Kurz and President of the European People's Party Group in the European Parliament Manfred Weber, participated in discussions, and delivered a speech at the EPP Conference on the Future of Europe.
- 17 September 2021: Poland (Warsaw), PM Šimonytė met with prime minister of Poland Mateusz Morawiecki, Marshal of the Sejm Elżbieta Witek, and Marshal of the Senate Tomasz Grodzki. The prime ministers of Lithuania and Poland chaired the second intergovernmental meeting of the Lithuanian and Polish Governments attended by 9 Lithuanian Ministers and 6 Vice-Ministers. During the intergovernmental meeting, the prime ministers signed a joint declaration on the bilateral cooperation. The meetings sought opportunities to further strengthen Lithuanian-Polish bilateral cooperation, especially in areas such as security and defence, home affairs, economy, and energy. Implementation of strategic infrastructure projects and cooperation between the countries in the EU and NATO formats were discussed. The intergovernmental meeting discussed the importance of preserving the identity of national minorities as well as their contribution to the strengthening of bilateral relations. During her visit, prime minister Šimonytė visited POLIN Museum of the History of Polish Jews, paid tribute to the memory of the Warsaw Ghetto fighters, and laid flowers at Monument to the Fallen and Murdered in the East.
- 22–23 October 2021: United Arab Emirates (Dubai, Abu Dhabi), PM Šimonytė opened the Lithuanian National Day at EXPO 2020 Dubai, and also the Business Forum of Lithuania and the UAE. The Lithuanian pavilion EXPO 2020 Dubai was visited by vice-president and prime minister of the United Arab Emirates Sheikh Mohammed bin Rashid Al Maktoum, together with prime minister of Lithuania and Minister for Economy and Innovation of Lithuania Aušrinė Armonaitė. Šimonytė also met with Minister of Foreign Affairs and International Cooperation of the United Arab Emirates Sheikh Abdullah bin Zayed Al Nahyan, Minister of State and Director General of Expo 2020 Reem Al Hashimi, and Minister of Economy Abdulla bin Touq Al Marri, to discuss the relevant issues in regional security, the situation in Afghanistan, and the UAE's relations with Israel. The prime minister brought forward the need to continue strengthening the bilateral relations, economic, and cultural cooperation. She also emphasized the importance of bilateral agreements for further development of the relations. Negotiations are under way on the promotion and protection of investment, mutual assistance in criminal matters, extradition, and the transfer of sentenced persons. The parties of the meeting also discussed Minsk regime-sponsored hybrid attack on Lithuania and the European Union. The national day of Lithuania at EXPO 2020 ended with the Vilnius City Opera, the Lithuanian State Symphony Orchestra, and prominent Lithuanian opera singers. At the end of her visit to UAE, the prime minister of Lithuania met with members of the local Lithuanian community.
- 10 December 2021: Moldova (Chișinău), during an official visit PM Šimonytė met with prime minister of Moldova Natalia Gavrilița, president of Moldova Maia Sandu, and President of the Moldovan Parliament Igor Grosu. In the meeting with the prime minister of Moldova, PM Šimonytė of Lithuania expressed support for the reforms undertaken by the Moldovan Government and its aspiration to move closer towards the EU. Šimonytė also emphasised that the implementation of the EU-Moldova Association Agreement, including its part on a Deep and Comprehensive Free Trade Area, also contributes to these ambitious goals. The counterparts discussed areas where Lithuania could step up its support for Moldova through shared expertise and closer inter-institutional cooperation, namely energy, reforming of justice and home affairs, anti-corruption, the environment, and others. During the visit, the Lithuanian and Moldovan Deputy Foreign Ministers signed a memorandum of understanding on strengthening Moldova's institutional capacity and governance. Lithuania will provide 350 thousand euros for the implementation of this memorandum.
  In the meeting with President of Moldova Maia Sandu, prime minister Šimonytė talked over the reforms, the regional security, co-operation with the EU, and the prospects of the Eastern Partnership policy in the context of the forthcoming Eastern Partnership Summit. The Prime Minister of Lithuania welcomed Moldova's ambitious attitude as regards the future of this policy, while encouraging to continue the joint efforts between Moldova, Ukraine and Sakartvelo towards closer dialogue with the EU.
  In her meeting with Speaker of the Moldovan Parliament Igor Grosu, the prime minister of Lithuania once again thanked the Moldovan Parliament for having been the first to recognise the restoration of the independent state of Lithuania 30 years ago. Šimonytė pointed out the importance of parliamentary diplomacy in gaining international support for Moldova's reform processes.
  Prime Minister Ingrida Šimonytė also participated in discussion with Lithuanian experts working in Moldova and together with the Prime Minister of Moldova opened an honorary consulate of the Republic of Lithuania.

2022

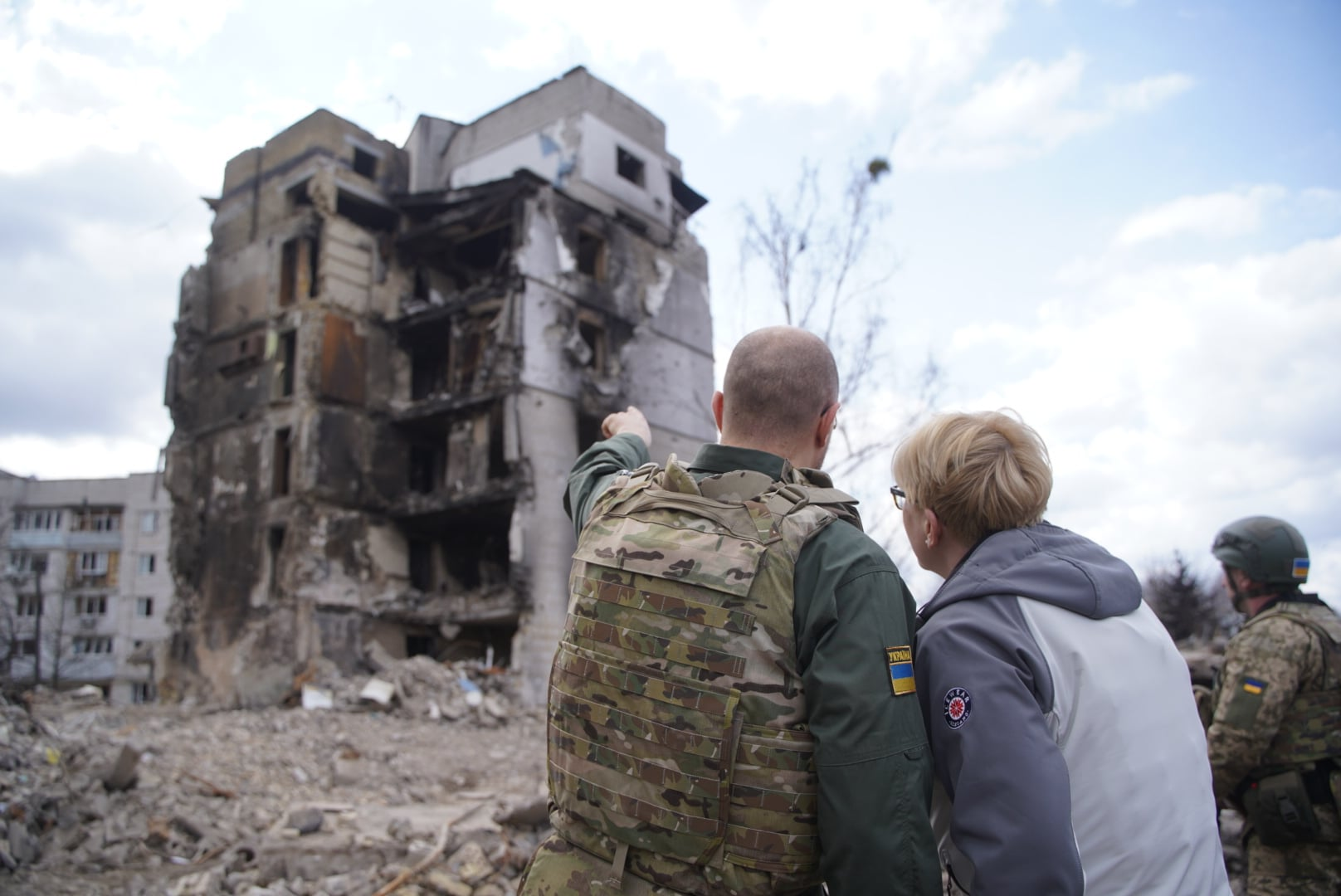
Šimonytė in Ukraine, 11 April 2022

- 7–8 February 2022: United Kingdom (London), during a working visit the PM met with prime minister of the United Kingdom Boris Johnson and UK Secretary of State for Defence Ben Wallace. One topic discussed in the meetings was the security situation in Europe amidst tensions caused by Russia's military build-up along the borders with Ukraine and Belarus. The parties also talked about diplomatic de-escalation efforts, the reinforcement of NATO's eastern flank, assistance to Ukraine, and sanctions against Russia and Belarus. The bilateral trade, economic relations and closer partnership at all levels were also among the items of the meetings' agendas between the prime ministers of Lithuania and the United Kingdom. During the visit to London, PM Šimonytė also addressed the annual event of the German Symposium at the London School of Economics, participated in a roundtable discussion with experts from the research institute Chatham House, and met with the Lithuanian community in the UK.
- 10–11 February 2022: Ukraine (Kyiv, Luhansk Oblast), PM Šimonytė paid an official visit to Ukraine. In the meetings in Kyiv with President of Ukraine Volodymyr Zelenskyy, Prime Minister of Ukraine Denys Shmyhal and Chairman of the Verkhovna Rada Ruslan Stefanchuk, topics discussed included the tense security situation amid the mounting pressure from Russia on Ukraine's eastern and northern borders. Lithuania's support for Ukraine was also discussed. PM Šimonytė of Lithuania has emphasised that Lithuania and Ukraine have enjoyed the strategic partnership strengthened by the shared history and the common need to withstand challenges. She also thanked Ukraine for its helping hand when Lithuania found itself on the frontline of Lukashenka's hybrid aggression. Prime Minister Šimonytė pointed out that Lithuania has always supported Ukraine and will continue to do so in the face of the threats posed by Russia. Lithuania is also increasing the number of military instructors as part of the Lithuanian military training mission in Ukraine and resuming the rehabilitation of Ukrainian soldiers in Lithuania. On the second day of the visit, the prime ministers of Lithuania and Ukraine visited the Luhansk region.

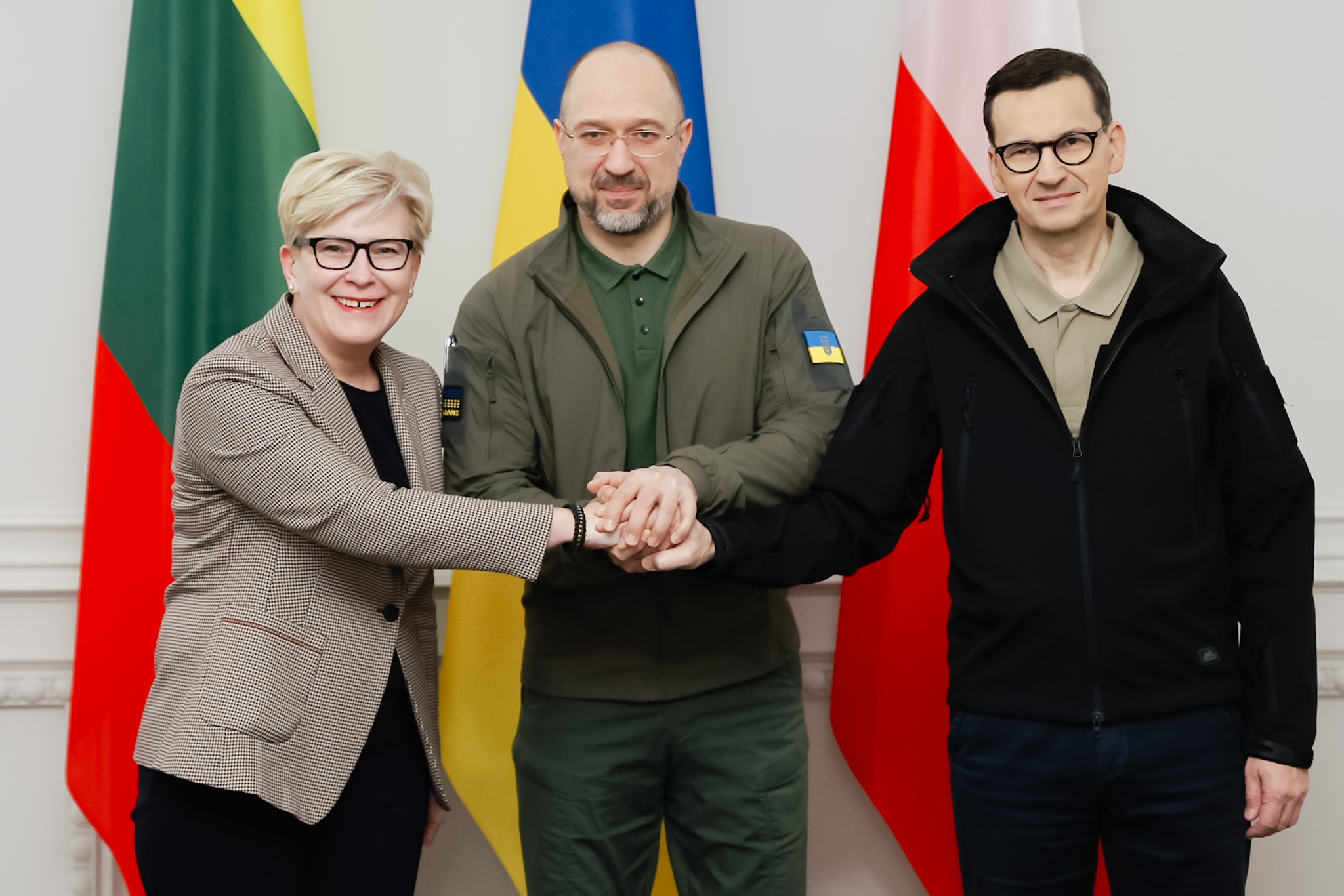
Ingrida Šimonytė during meeting of prime ministers of Lublin Triangle in Kyiv, 2022

- 26 November 2022: Ukraine (Kyiv), Šimonytė attended a summit launching the "Grain from Ukraine" initiative, which aims to export Ukrainian grain to countries vulnerable to famine and drought, along with prime minister of Belgium Alexander De Croo, prime minister of Poland Mateusz Morawiecki, president of Hungary Katalin Novák, and president of Ukraine Volodymyr Zelenskyy.

==== Welcomed delegations ====
- 26 January 2021: Vatican, Šimonytė met with Apostolic Nuncio Archbishop Dr Petar Rajič.
- 29 January 2021: Belarus, she met with Sviatlana Tsikhanouskaya, leader of democratic society in Belarus, to discuss the political situation in Belarus and Lithuania's further support to the people of Belarus.
- 3 March 2021: Estonia, Šimonytė met with Estonian President Kersti Kaljulaid to discuss the management of the pandemic, economic recovery, and digital and green agendas.
- 7 March 2021: Spain, Šimonytė met with Minister of Foreign Affairs, European Union and Cooperation of Spain Arancha González Laya to discuss the pandemic management and the development of bilateral relations.
- 23 April 2021: North Macedonia, PM Šimonytė met with deputy prime minister for European Integration of North Macedonia Nikola Dimitrov to discuss the country's EU integration process and bilateral relations.
- 2 May 2021: Poland, She met with Prime Minister of Poland Mateusz Morawiecki and discussed bilateral cooperation and strategic partnership.
- 12 May 2021: Armenia, Šimonytė met with President of the National Assembly of Armenia Ararat Mirzoyan and the parliamentary delegation, and discussed bilateral cooperation, democratic reforms, Armenia-EU relations, and the fight against COVID-19.
- 31 May 2021: European Union, Šimonytė met with European Commissioner for Internal Market Thierry Breton and has presented Lithuania's life sciences potential.
- 4 June 2021: European Union, she met with First Vice-President of the European Commission, Executive Vice President of the European Commission for the European Green Deal Frans Timmermans and discussed environmental issues, European Green Deal.
- 10 June 2021: European Union, the PM met with Vice President of the European Commission for Values and Transparency Věra Jourová and discussed the EU's efforts to combat disinformation, the deteriorating media and human rights situation in Belarus and Russia, and support for the Eastern Partnership countries in this area.
- 2 July 2021: European Union, she met with President of the European Commission Ursula von der Leyen and discussed the EC's assessment of the national recovery and resilience plan ‘Next Generation Lithuania’, economic recovery of the European Union (EU), efforts to control the COVID-19 pandemic, and EU's response to the challenges posed by the Belarusian regime. There was an exchange of views on the rapidly spreading COVID-19 Delta mutation and the resulting risks in the fight against the pandemic, the pace of economic recovery in the EU, and the risk of inflation. Prime Minister Šimonytė and President of the EC von der Leyen have also discussed the unprecedented illegal migration organised by the Belarusian regime across the Lithuanian-Belarusian border. The prime minister thanked the EC and other EU institutions for their support in sending officials and planning additional funding for reinforced control of the EU's external borders. They also visited Vilnius transformer substation where together with President of Lithuania Gitanas Nausėda they presented the national recovery and resilience plan ‘Next Generation Lithuania’.
- 3 July 2021: Japan, Prime Minister Šimonytė met with Minister for Foreign Affairs of Japan Toshimitsu Motegi and discussed ways to strengthen the bilateral strategic ties and political and economic cooperation, also the latest developments in the European Union's Eastern neighbourhood and in the Indian Pacific regions. The parties have brought up the need for closer cooperation, particularly in the context of the growing geopolitical and security tensions in the neighbourhood of both Lithuania and Japan. They have also discussed synchronisation, energy and Rail Baltica. Other items discussed have included the illegal migration weaponised by the Belarusian regime, propaganda-posed challenges, and initiatives to commemorate Sugihara.
- 6 July 2021: European Union, the PM met with President of the European Council Charles Michel. They visited the Lithuanian-Belarusian border to see the border surveillance system, met with representatives of the Frontex mission and also visited the premises of temporary isolation of illegal migrants at the Border Guard School in Medininkai. The Prime Minister thanked Charles Michel for his time to visit the EU external border, which now must cope with the increasing flows of illegal migration schemed by the Belarusian authorities.
- 7 July 2021: Ukraine, she met with prime minister of Ukraine Denys Shmyhal and discussed prospects for bilateral cooperation. The Foreign Ministers of both countries also joined the meeting. Prime Minister Šimonytė reiterated that Lithuania has been firmly and consistently supporting Ukraine in its fight against Russia's aggression, and Ukraine's European and Euro-Atlantic integration aspirations, and that it stands ready to continue sharing experience and expertise as Ukraine carries on with reforms. On Ukraine's European aspirations, the importance of closer cooperation and coordination between the three associated partners, Ukraine, Sakartvelo and Moldova, was pointed out. The parties also discussed NATO's partnership with Ukraine and Ukraine's contribution to the Euro-Atlantic security. On the bilateral economic relations, the parties noted that there is still room for improvement in not only the traditional but also innovative sectors of the economy. Lithuanian business is particularly interested in taking further relations with Ukraine. The counterparts also touched upon the deteriorating situation in Belarus and A. Lukashenko's hybrid aggression waged against Lithuania. The prime minister thanked Ukraine for the decisions made by Rada and Ukraine's State Regulatory Commission for Energy and Utilities to curb electricity imports from Russia and Belarus. PM Šimonytė of Lithuania expressed hope that this decision will be long-lasting and underlined that through solidarity shown in this respect, together they will undermine Belarusian regime's schemes to profit from the unsafe NPP, and will also bring down Russia's influence in the region.
- 8 July 2021: Spain, Šimonytė met with prime minister of the Kingdom of Spain Pedro Sánchez Pérez-Castejón. The items covered included the Lithuanian-Spanish bilateral relations; economic cooperation; cooperation on EU, NATO and security issues; the situation in Belarus and Russia; illegal migration; threats posed by unsafe Astravets NPP, and EU relations with its southern and eastern neighbours. On economic cooperation, the counterparts agreed about the need to focus more on life sciences, high technologies, green energy, along with the traditional industries. Prime Minister Šimonytė thanked the Prime Minister Sánchez for Spain's contribution to the Baltic security. The Prime Ministers talked about Belarusian regime-facilitated flow of illegal migrants posing a threat to the entire EU. The Lithuanian Prime Minister has pointed out that Belarusian regime's unpredictability has further highlighted the problem of the unsafe Astravets NPP. Also, the prime ministers discussed the significantly deteriorating human-rights situation in Belarus and Russia, and the challenges posed by China. The counterparts have talked about the forthcoming Eastern Partnership Summit and agreed about the need to strengthen EU's relations with its southern and eastern neighbours. Both prime ministers had a brief tour of Vilnius University.
- 2 August 2021: European Union, the PM met with European Commissioner for Home Affairs Ylva Johansson and discussed the situation and the European Commission's assistance in the face of the steady increase, with the assistance of the regime, in the flow of irregular migrants through Belarus to Lithuania. PM Šimonytė has noted the deteriorating situation, which calls for urgent decisions at both national and EU level and stressed that in the last two days alone, almost half a thousand irregular migrants had crossed the border. It was agreed at the meeting that joint efforts should first and foremost focus on reducing migratory flows, returning irregular migrants to their countries of origin, and urging Iraq to comply with its international obligations. Also prime minister of Lithuania noted that Lithuania is bearing a significant financial burden. Hence possibilities of financial assistance from the European Commission, including technical assistance in installing border surveillance and control systems, were discussed at the meeting with Commissioner Johansson. According to Šimonytė, Lithuania is doing its utmost to ensure that irregular migrants are promptly detained and that no new transit route is created. The necessary legislative changes have been adopted to allow all planned asylum procedures to be carried out without delay. The meeting emphasised the need to prevent human trafficking, dismantle irregular migration networks, and deter migrants from attempting to cross the EU's external border illegally. Furthermore, PM Šimonytė emphasised that the Government does not see any alternative to creating a physical barrier.
- 13 August 2021: Vatican, the PM met with Secretary of State of the Holy See Pietro Parolin for a tête-à-tête meeting. The Prime Minister and the Cardinal Secretary of State discussed the Lithuanian-Vatican bilateral cooperation and the human rights situation in Belarus. The prime minister emphasised during the conversation that Lithuania supports the call by the Church for a peaceful and just solution to the situation in Belarus, based on sincere dialogue, rejection of violence, and respect for justice as well as fundamental human and civil rights. The meeting addressed also the response to the COVID-19 pandemic, Belarusian regime-sponsored irregular migration to the EU, the situation in the occupied Crimea and Donbas, support for Taiwan, and relations with China.
- 18 August 2021: European Union, the PM met with President of the European Parliament David Sassoli to discuss irregular migration from Belarus to Lithuania and the European Union initiatives in this regard. In the meeting it was agreed that pressure on the Belarusian regime should continue to grow, and that EU sectorial sanctions should continue to be applied. It is also necessary to extend personal sanctions to all those directly and indirectly involved in the organisation of illegal migration flows. The meeting focused on strengthening the Eastern Partnership, as well as the forthcoming Eastern Partnership Summit. Prime Minister Šimonytė assured President of the European Parliament Sassoli that Lithuania is ready to work to strengthen the strategic content of the Eastern Partnership and to offer motivating objectives to the Eastern Partners. Participants in the meeting also discussed the European integration of the Western Balkans and the situation in Afghanistan.
- 4 September 2021: European Union Lithuania's PM met with Margaritis Schinas Vice-President of European Commission for Promoting our European Way of Life, and discussed migration and other matters on the European Union agenda. The meeting focused on the New Pact on Migration and Asylum. They visited the Belarus-Lithuania border, met with the executive director of European Border and Coast Guard Agency (FRONTEX) Fabrice Leggeri, representatives of the mission, and officials of the European Asylum Support Office (EASO), and saw a camp for irregular migrants at the Border Guard School in Medininkai.
- 6 September 2021: Poland, Lithuania's PM met with Minister of Foreign Affairs of the Republic of Poland Zbigniew Rau and discussed the bilateral relations and economic cooperation and ways to strengthen them; the development of joint infrastructure projects; Lithuania-Poland cooperation to address regional security issues and the challenges of irregular migration; also Eastern Partnership, and the European Union's relations with Russia. Russia's aggressive policies have been discussed as well.
- 7 September 2021: Czech Republic, Lithuania's PM met with Minister of Foreign Affairs of the Czech Republic Jakub Kulhánek and discussed bilateral economic co-operation and ways to strengthen it; also tourism, regional security, the co-operation between the countries in the fight against irregular migration, and the importance of EU solidarity in response to Russia's malicious actions. The parties have discussed the EU's migration and asylum policy and the need to strengthen the protection of the EU's external borders.
- 24 September 2021: European Union, PM Simonyte met with First Vice-President of the European Parliament Roberta Metsola and discussed measures to combat the hybrid attack by Belarus against the EU, challenges posed by irregular migration used by authoritarian regimes, the European Green Deal, and other policy matters.
- 29 September 2021: European Union, PM Simonyte met with President of the European Court of Auditors Klaus-Heiner Lehne and Member of the European Court of Auditors Rimantas Šadžius to discuss, among other issues, the current report, the conclusions of which are as never before responsive to the challenges currently faced by Lithuania, which is currently subjected to a hybrid attack of artificially construed flows of irregular migrants.
- 30 September 2021: Denmark, PM Simonyte met with Her Royal Highness Mary, Crown Princess of Denmark. Great potential for cooperation has been noted in high value-added production, biotechnology (vaccine development), life sciences, alternative fuel sources, science and studies, and culture. With regard to COVID-19 challenges, rapid vaccination rollout has been pointed out as a key priority. It was also pointed out that the support and assistance of the closest partners has significantly helped to cope with the migration crisis on the Lithuanian-Belarusian border, noting Denmark's support in particular.
- 4 October 2021: Armenia, Lithuania's PM met with prime minister of Armenia Nikol Pashinyan and his delegation while on an official visit to Lithuania. During the meeting, further prospects for Lithuanian-Armenian bilateral relations, the European Union-Armenia cooperation, regional matters, and preparation for the Eastern Partnership Summit, to be held on 15 December 2021, were discussed. Particular attention was paid to strengthening bilateral cooperation in the field of health. On the margins of the meeting, the Lithuanian and Armenian Ministers of Health signed a cooperation agreement.
- 20 October 2021: Poland, The Prime Minister met with president of the Republic of Poland Andrzej Duda. The Prime Minister expressed her delight at the fact that the meeting took place to commemorate the 230th anniversary of the Mutual Pledge of the Two Nations, and that Poland and Lithuania are more and more often celebrating the mutually important dates together. Šimonytė also thanked the President of Poland for the assistance in combating the ongoing hybrid attack at the borders and for the excellent cooperation between the border and other services in addressing the challenges at the European Union's external border. The prime minister of Lithuania and the President of Poland have discussed the importance of cooperation between the two countries in the field of defence and security and within the EU. Their meeting focused on the implementation of the strategic infrastructure projects (synchronisation of electricity networks, gas connections, Rail Baltica, Via Baltica, and Via Carpathia).

== Political stances ==
=== Foreign policy ===
In October 2018, during a debate on foreign policy for the Homeland Union nomination in the 2019 presidential election, Šimonytė stated that if elected president, she would increase funding for national security and defense. She has referred to Russia as a "state that has broken all international agreements", and called Russia a threat to European security. Additionally, Šimonytė has referred to Poland as an ally, and has encouraged improving relations between the two countries. She said that Russia offers its Sputnik V COVID-19 vaccine "to the world as another hybrid weapon to divide and rule."

Šimonytė supports scientific data on climate change, and referred to Donald Trump's decision to withdraw from the Paris Agreement as a "mistake".

Šimonytė's new ruling coalition has agreed to defend "those fighting for freedom" in Taiwan, suggesting that Lithuania's relations with China would not be a priority for her government.

In June 2023, during a visit to Israel, she urged Israel to join the anti-Russian coalition of Western countries. She said that the Holocaust was "an indescribable trauma upon Lithuania, leaving lasting scars that persist even to this day."

In April 2024, the Lithuanian government considered repatriating Ukrainian men of military age living in Lithuania to Ukraine to be drafted into the Ukrainian army. Šimonytė voiced support for the repatriation of military-age Ukrainian men to Ukraine.

=== Domestic policy ===
Šimonytė has stated that she did not oppose the introduction of same-sex civil unions to Lithuania, which attracted the support of LGBT rights activists. Additionally, Šimonytė stated that while she would never have an abortion herself, she would not condemn women who choose to do so.

Šimonytė was criticized by the Jewish community in Lithuania after she opposed removing a plaque to Jonas Noreika, who had signed the declaration to establish Jewish ghettos in Lithuania during the German occupation of Lithuania in 1941.

== Personal life ==
In addition to her native Lithuanian, Šimonytė also speaks English, Polish, and Russian, as well as basic-level Swedish. She is unmarried and has no children. The Good Soldier Švejk, a satirical dark comedy by Czech writer Jaroslav Hašek, is one of Šimonytė's favorite books, whose characters she has often publicly quoted during her political career.

== Honours and awards ==
=== Honours ===
==== National honours ====
- Lithuania: Officer's Cross of the Order of Vytautas the Great (16 February 2015)

=== Awards ===
- „Baltoji banga“ award for 'transparent and accountable activity' (2012)
- Delfi Women of the Year 2019 (Politics) (26 July 2019)
- Delfi Women of the Year 2020 (Politics) (19 August 2020)

Seimas
Preceded by Andrius Kubilius	Member of the Seimas for Antakalnis; 2016–	Incumbent
Political offices
Preceded by Algirdas Šemeta	Minister of Finance; 2009–2012	Succeeded by Rimantas Šadžius
Preceded by Saulius Skvernelis	Prime Minister of Lithuania; 2020–2024	Succeeded by Gintautas Paluckas
