= Vaiciukevičiūtė =

Vaiciukevičiūtė is a surname. Notable people with the surname include:

- Agnė Vaiciukevičiūtė (born 1989), Lithuanian politician
- Monika Vaiciukevičiūtė (born 1996), Lithuanian race walker
- Živilė Vaiciukevičiūtė (born 1996), Lithuanian race walker
