= Eric Huang =

- 黃鈞耀
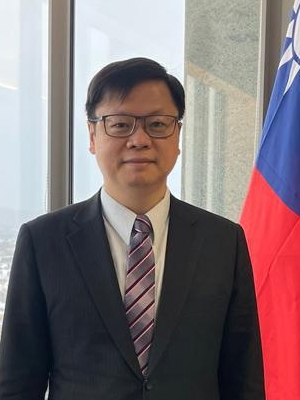
- Huang in 2021
- Born: 11 May 1973 (age 52); Taiwan
- Education: National Taiwan University (BA); University of Chicago (MA); Harvard University; University of Oxford
- Occupation: Diplomat
- Title: Former Head of the Taiwanese Representative Office in Lithuania

Eric Huang (Chinese: 黃鈞耀, pinyin: Huáng Jūn-yào; born in 1973) is a Taiwanese diplomat who worked in missions in the United States, Singapore, Canada, and the Baltic States.

== Biography ==
Eric Huang graduated from National Taiwan University with a Bachelor of Arts in international business and received a Master of Arts from the University of Chicago. With the referral of the country's Ministry of Foreign Affairs, he completed the training programs of Harvard and Oxford universities at different times.

He is married and has two children.

== Career ==
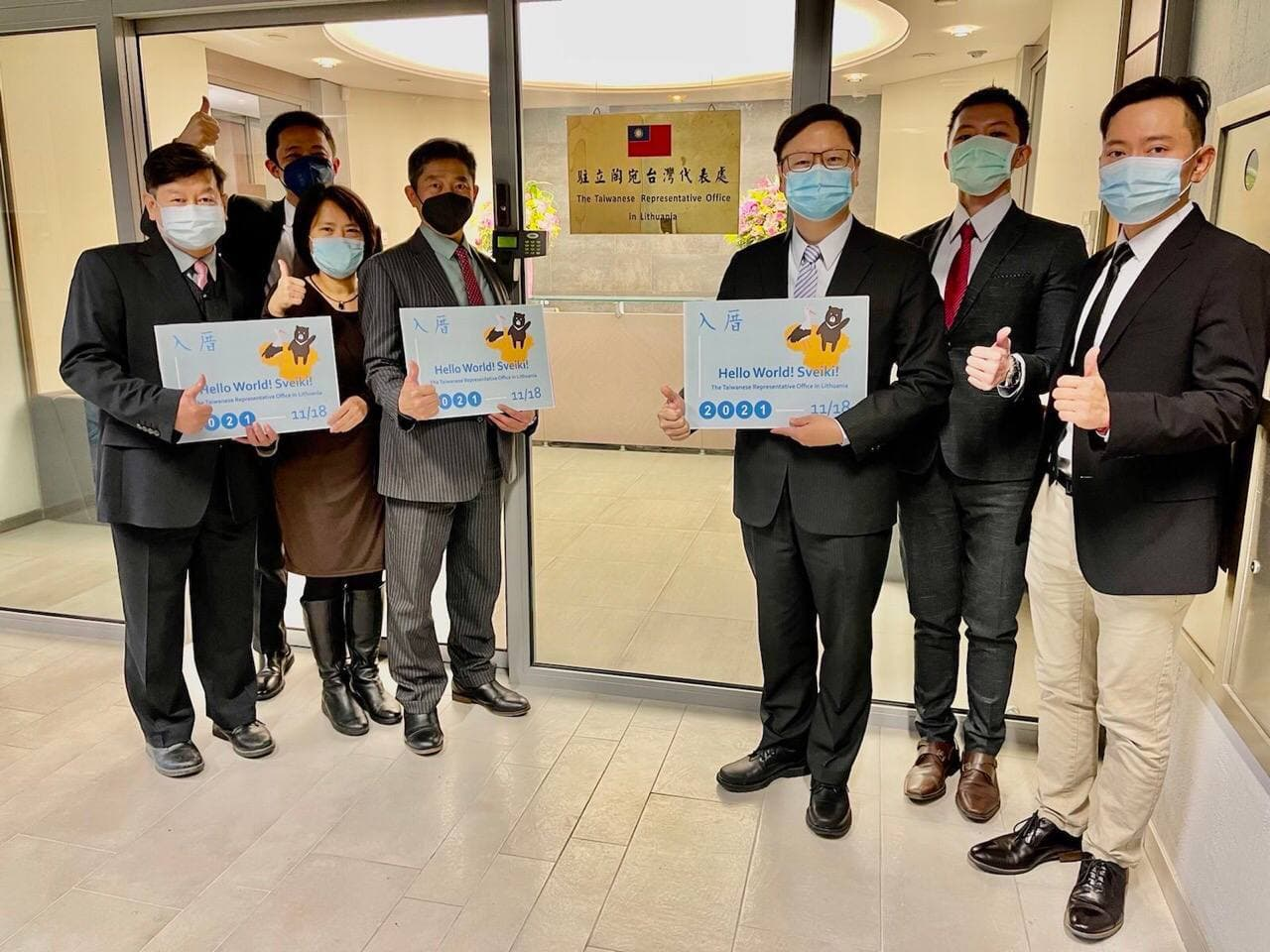
Opening of Taiwanese Representative Office in Lithuania. E. Huang is third from the right.

2012–2015 worked at the mission in Singapore, was responsible for bilateral political and free trade agreements.

2016–2018 was the Deputy Director General of the Department of International Cooperation and Economic Affairs of the Ministry of Foreign Affairs of Taiwan.

2018–2020 was the director general of the Taiwan Economic and Cultural Office in Chicago.

In 2020 was appointed head of the Taipei mission in Latvia, which he was also responsible for relations with Estonia and Lithuania. in 2021 in November after the establishment of the Taiwanese Representative Office in Lithuania, he became its first head.

== See also ==
- Ministry of Foreign Affairs (Taiwan)
- Taiwanese Representative Office in Lithuania
- Lithuania–Taiwan relations
