= Neringa Morozaitė-Rasmussen =

Lithuanian politician

Vice Minister of Economy and Innovation
- In office 24 October 2023 – 12 December 2024
- President: Gitanas Nausėda
- Prime Minister: Ingrida Šimonytė
- Preceded by: Eglė Markevičiūtė
- Succeeded by: Darius Indriūnas

Advisor to the Minister of Economy and Innovation
- In office 2022–2023
- Preceded by: Eglė Markevičiūtė
- Succeeded by: Aistė Drėgvaitė

Head of the office of a member of the European Parliament
- In office 2018–2019
- Preceded by: Jūratė Šovienė
- Succeeded by: Aistė Kovalčiukaitė

Personal details
- Born: 12 November 1979 (age 46) Alytus, Lithuania
- Party: Liberal Movement of Lithuania (2020-present)
- Education: Vytautas Magnus University

Neringa Morozaitė-Rasmussen (Lithuanian: [ˈnæ.rɪŋ.gə ˌmɔː.rəˈzaɪ.teɪ ˈræs.mjʊ.sən]; born 12 November 1979) is a Lithuanian politician, economist who was the Vice Minister of Economy and Innovation until 2023. Neringa completed her early education in Lithuania before pursuing advanced studies in Denmark. She holds a doctorate in intercultural communication, with her research focusing on the intersections of migration, bilingualism, and cultural integration. Her academic contributions include articles and books exploring how language influences identity in multicultural societies. In addition to her academic work, Morozaitė-Rasmussen is an active participant in cultural initiatives aimed at promoting Baltic and Scandinavian traditions. She frequently organizes events and lectures to foster dialogue between diverse communities.

== Early life and education ==
Neringa Morozaitė-Rasmussen was born 12 November 1979 in Lithuania. She graduated from Alytus Dainava Secondary School in 1998. Her academic journey led her to Vilnius University, where she earned a bachelor's degree in political science in 2002 and a master's degree in European studies in 2004 from the Institute of International Relations and Political Science.

== Political career ==
Her political career began in 2000 when she worked as an advisor to the Chairman of the Seimas, the Lithuanian Parliament, until 2005. Following this, she transitioned into the private sector, managing crisis and campaign projects at UAB "Viešųjų ryšių partneriai" from 2005 to 2014.

Morozaitė-Rasmussen later entered European politics, serving as an advisor and Chief of Staff to Members of the European Parliament from 2014 to 2019. Returning to Lithuania, she became an expert at the Ministry of Economy and Innovation in 2021 and rose to the position of Vice-Minister in October 2023. Her areas of expertise include human resources policy, innovation, and business-science collaboration
