= Lithuania–Taiwan relations =

- Taiwan: Lithuania

Diplomatic mission
- Taiwanese Representative Office in Lithuania: Lithuanian Trade Representative Office

Envoy
- Representative Constance H. Wang: Representative Paulius Lukauskas

Taiwan, officially the Republic of China, does not have official diplomatic relations with Lithuania, since Lithuania does not officially recognize the Republic of China and maintains a One-China Policy whereby it views the People's Republic of China as the sole legitimate government representing China. Despite this, relations between Lithuania and Taiwan have grown closer in recent years. In 2021, Taiwan opened the "Taiwanese Representative Office in Lithuania". Lithuania opened a representative office in Taiwan in 2022. The strengthening of relations between Lithuania and Taiwan has been heavily opposed by the People's Republic of China (PRC), which doesn't recognize Taiwan's effective sovereignty. Notably, the PRC has downgraded its embassy in Lithuania to the status of a "chargé d'affaires" in protest. The PRC and Lithuania had previously maintained full diplomatic relations with one another since 1991.

== History ==
The Republic of China (ROC) and Lithuania established diplomatic relations in 1921, three years after Lithuania's declaration of independence in 1918. The relations continued until the Soviet occupation of the Baltic states in 1940. The ROC did not recognise the Soviet annexation of Lithuania. The ROC lost the vast majority of its territory, namely mainland China, to the People's Republic of China (PRC) in the Chinese Civil War, and its government retreated to the island of Taiwan, formerly a Japanese colony and minor associated islands in 1949. Democratic Lithuania and modern-day ROC established unofficial diplomatic relations in 2021, 31 years after the restoration of Lithuania's independence in 1990.

In 1991, the PRC and Lithuania established diplomatic relations with one another, one year after the restoration of Lithuania's independence in 1990. Contemporaneously, Lithuania and Taiwan did not have much contact throughout the 1990s and 2000s, with Taiwan's main partner in the Baltic states being Latvia prior to 2021.

A mishap occurred during the medal ceremony in 2015 World Deaf Basketball Championships in Taoyuan, Taiwan. After the Lithuanian team won the final against the United States, the organizers of the tournament erroneously played the Soviet-era anthem instead of the actual anthem, upsetting the Lithuanians. The team, led by coach Algimantas Šatas, was forced to stand in dais during the entirety of the song. Later, the organizers recognized the mistake and apologized.

=== Warming relations in the 21st century ===
Since 2020, Lithuania–Taiwan relations have rapidly warmed, and in April of that year 200 Lithuanian politicians and public figures petitioned the President of Lithuania to support Taiwan's membership in the World Health Organization. These calls were reiterated by the then-foreign minister, Linas Linkevičius, in a direct phone call with the head of the WHO. On 19 June 2020, Taiwanese representative to the Baltic states Andy Chin spoke in the Seimas at the invitation of the opposition Homeland Union, inviting objection from China and marking the highest platform any Taiwanese official had achieved in the Baltic states.

Lithuania's Freedom Party platform has a clause supporting full recognition of the independence of Taiwan (ROC), and in the 2020 Lithuanian parliamentary election, parties sympathetic to Taiwan such as the Homeland Union and Freedom Party entered government and formed a coalition. In 2021, the Lithuania-Taiwan Forum was established by over 50 Lithuanian political figures, most notably Mantas Adomėnas and Gintaras Steponavičius, and it was announced that Lithuania would open a trade office in Taiwan amidst growing discontent with China's "17 + 1" program.

In October 2021, Lithuania's parliament passed a legislative revision that gave the green light to the country to open a representative office in Taiwan. On 18 November 2021, Taiwan opened its de facto embassy, the Taiwanese Representative Office in Lithuania, in Vilnius. The naming of this office was notable for its use of "Taiwan" in the title rather than Taipei, though Lithuanian officials confirmed that the office would not have diplomatic status and the name would not imply recognition of statehood, and have maintained that it was not in breach of their 1991 recognition of the PRC's One China principle during their establishment of diplomatic relations in 1991. However, Beijing disagreed and recalled their ambassador from Vilnius and expelled the Lithuanian ambassador in Beijing. In early January 2022, The Taiwanese Representative Office in Vilnius announced that the Taiwanese government was planning to invest $200 million (USD) into Lithuania's industry and technology sectors later in the year.

In an interview with The Economist in April 2022, Prime Minister of Lithuania Ingrida Šimonytė stated that Lithuania does not regret the decision to strengthen its ties with Taiwan. She described relationship between Taiwan and Lithuania as "vibrant and productive," emphasizing that it was a sovereign decision by Lithuania to enhance its connections with Taiwanese businesses and universities. In an October 2022 interview with Nikkei Asia, she stated that Lithuania's ties with Taiwan can contribute to significant development in industrial fields such as semiconductors and lasers. In August 2022, the Deputy Minister for Transport and Communications Agnė Vaiciukevičiūtė made a 4-day visit to Taiwan in company with officials of the electro bus market in Lithuania. During the visit she also met Foreign Minister Jaushieh Joseph Wu. After the visit concluded, China imposed sanctions on Vaiciukevičiūtė.

In January 2025, former Lithuanian foreign minister Gabrielius Landsbergis was awarded the Order of Brilliant Star by Taiwanese president Lai Ching-te for deepening relations between the two countries during his term.

=== Competing relations with China ===
In May 2024, President of Lithuania Gitanas Nausėda stated in an interview that while he welcomed the establishment of the Taiwanese Representative Office, in the context of normalization of Lithuania's relations with China, there would be a need to change its name. In response to Nausėda's comments, Foreign Minister Wu stated that the office's name that was agreed on in 2021 by the governments of Lithuania and Taiwan, after negotiations and signing of documents. He also further stated that Taiwan had not received any official request for name change and would not accept it even if such request was received.

Following the defeat of the centre-right coalition in the 2024 Lithuanian parliamentary election, the new presumptive Prime Minister Gintautas Paluckas of the victorious Social Democratic Party vowed to re-establish full diplomatic relations with China. Paluckas described the previous government's decision to open the Taiwanese representative office as a "grave diplomatic mistake", but declined to comment on whether he would ask Taiwan to rename it. Taiwanese Foreign Minister Lin Chia-lung stated that Taiwan did not oppose Lithuania restoring ties with China, and emphasized that Lithuania could maintain relations with both China and Taiwan.

== Trade and cultural cooperation ==
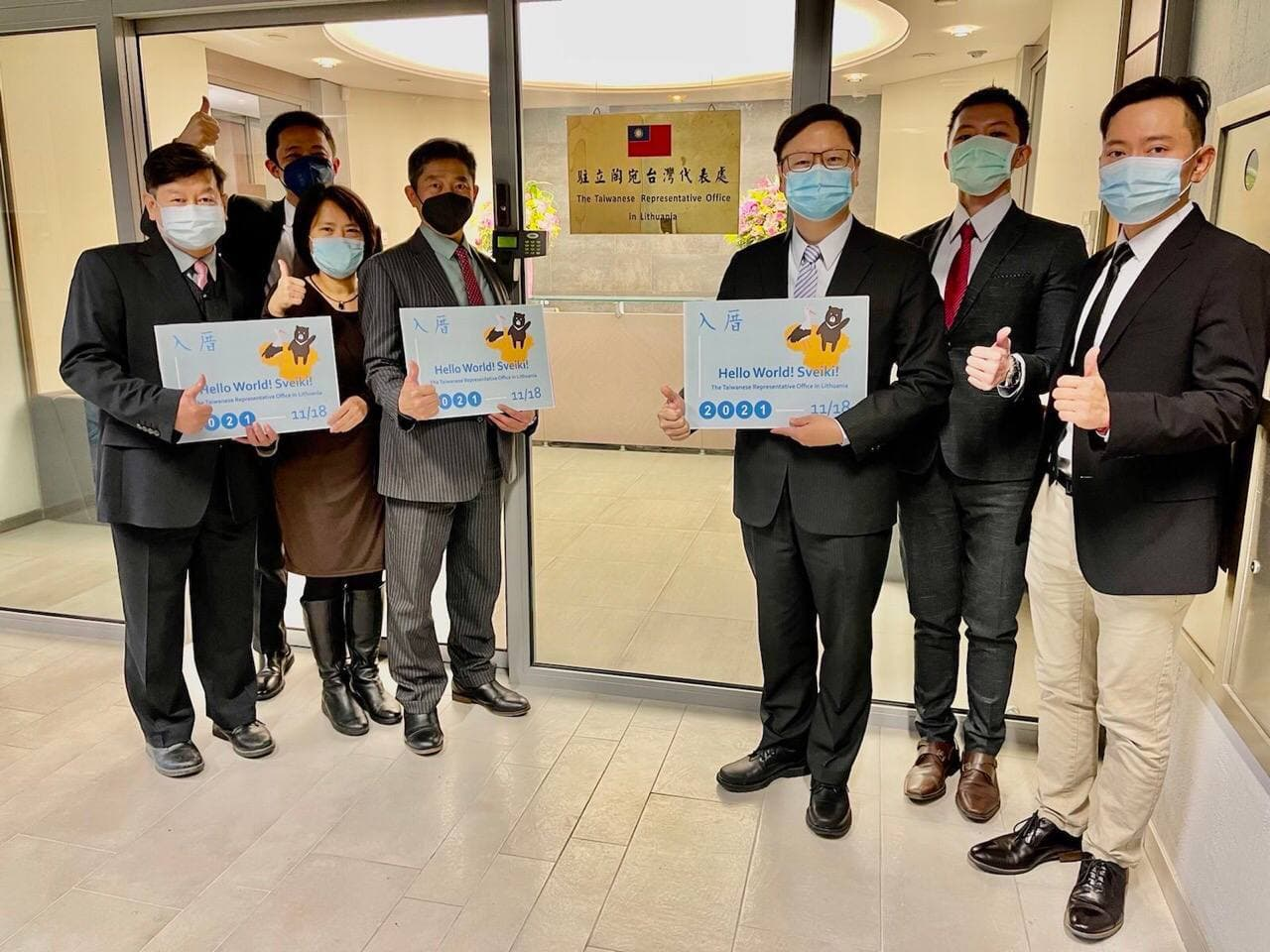
Taiwanese Representative Office in Lithuania

Taipei and Vilnius established sister city status on 28 May 1998.

In 2020, Lithuania exported $37.8 million (USD) to Taiwan or 0.07%, and imported $97.3 million, or 0.23%. Lithuanian exports were predominantly tobacco, chemicals, furniture and wood, while Taiwanese exports were mainly in the tech and machinery sector.

In September 2021, Taiwanese official statistics showed 112,000 credit card transactions from Taiwanese at Lithuanian businesses with a total volume of $86 million (USD), and the Bank of Lithuania observed an increase of 56% from the period from the previous year.

== Aid ==
Taiwan donated 100,000 face masks to Lithuania early during the COVID-19 pandemic. In 2021, Lithuania donated 20,000 and then a further 235,900 doses of the AstraZeneca COVID-19 vaccine to Taiwan. Taiwanese food giant I-Mei Foods donated over 21,000 of its signature puff cookies to Lithuania in gratitude.

== See also ==
- Foreign relations of Lithuania
- Foreign relations of Taiwan
- Taiwanese Representative Office in Lithuania
- Government of the Republic of China
- China–Lithuania relations
