= ISM University of Management and Economics =

Business school

Coordinates: 54°40′31″N 25°17′15″E

- Type: Private
- Established: 1999; 27 years ago
- Parent institution: Kaunas University of Technology
- Rector: Dalius Misiūnas
- Students: About 1800 undergraduates
- Location: Vilnius, Lithuania
- Website: www.ism.lt

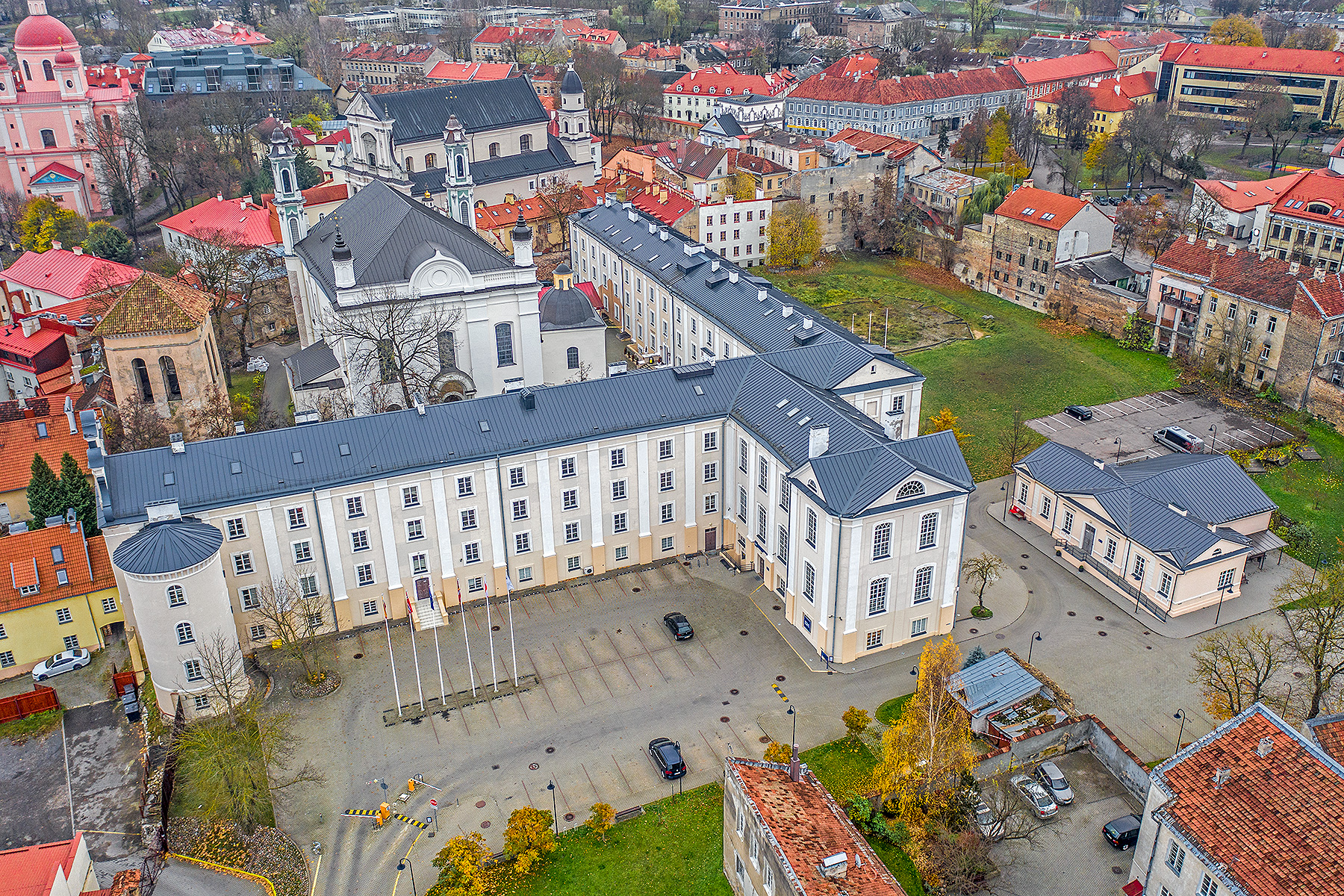

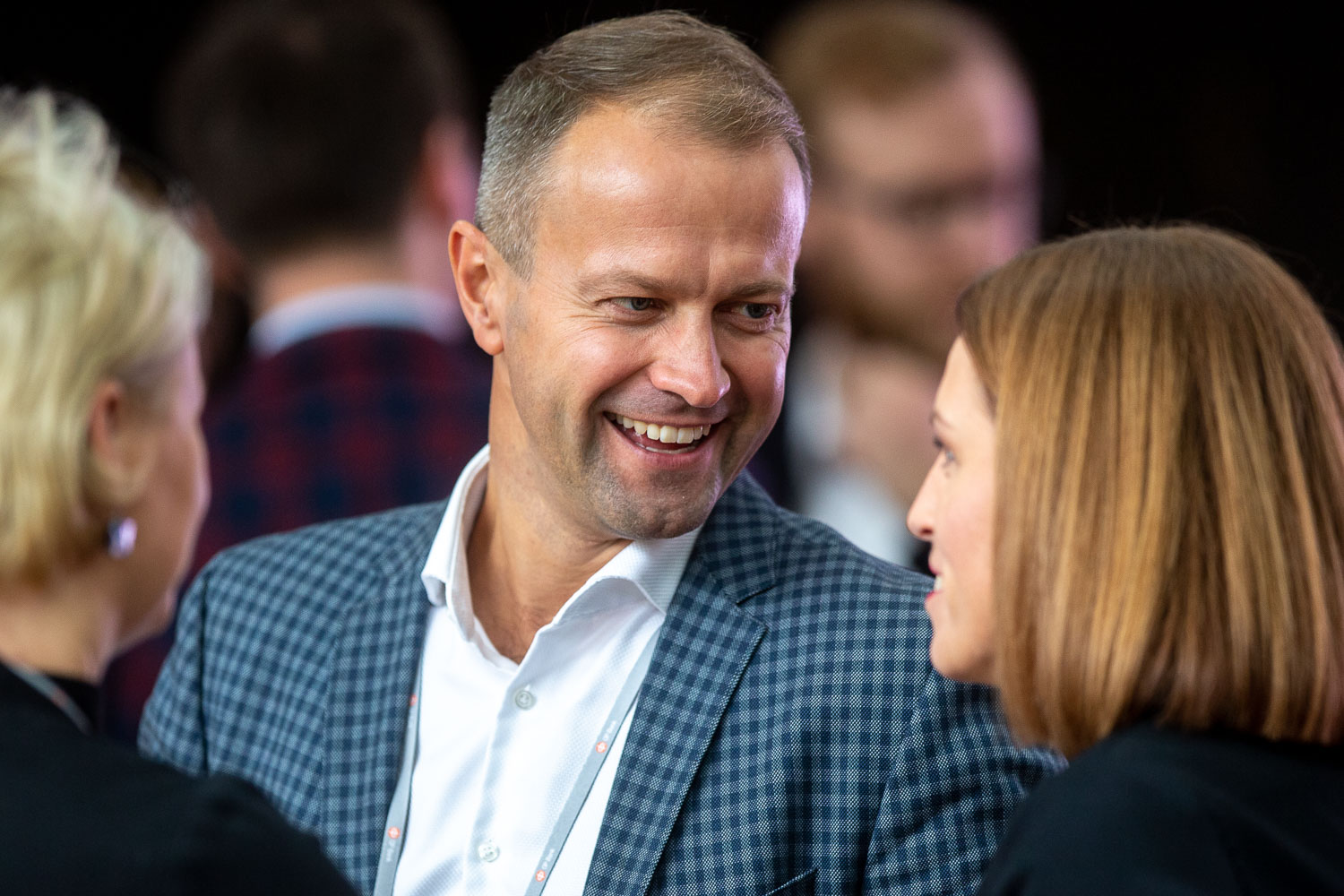
Rector Dalius Misiūnas

ISM University of Management and Economics (Lithuanian: ISM Vadybos ir ekonomikos universitetas) is an institution of undergraduate, graduate and post-graduate education in business, management and economics. The university serves as a centre of market analysis, executive training and academic thought.

ISM was established in Kaunas in 1999 as the first privately owned institution of management education in Lithuania. The main founders of ISM are the BI Norwegian Business School and the Norwegian Industrial and Regional Development Fund. The predecessor of ISM was the Business Training Centre, an executive training institution in Lithuania.

Since 1995, when the Business Training Centre began, the intention was to contribute to the development of Lithuanian business community in providing up-to-date management knowledge. By offering executive courses, management training programs, market research, and personnel evaluation, BMC was recognized as an institution of management training and consulting in Lithuania. Now BMC is the training and consulting department at ISM.

== Academics ==
There are six undergraduate and five graduate programs.

Undergraduate studies:

- Business Management and Marketing;
- Economics;
- Economics and Politics;
- Finance;
- International Business and Communication;
- Entrepreneurship and Innovation.

Graduate studies:

- International Marketing and Management;
- Financial Economics;
- Innovation and Technology Management;
- Global Leadership and Strategy;
- Business Sustainability Management.

Executive studies:

Business Process Management

- Financial Strategy and Management;
- International Business
- Human Resource Management;
- Leadership: Power Actualisation;
- Managerial Accounting Analysis
- Managerial Economics
- Marketing Strategy and Management;
- Project Management;
- Strategic Management;

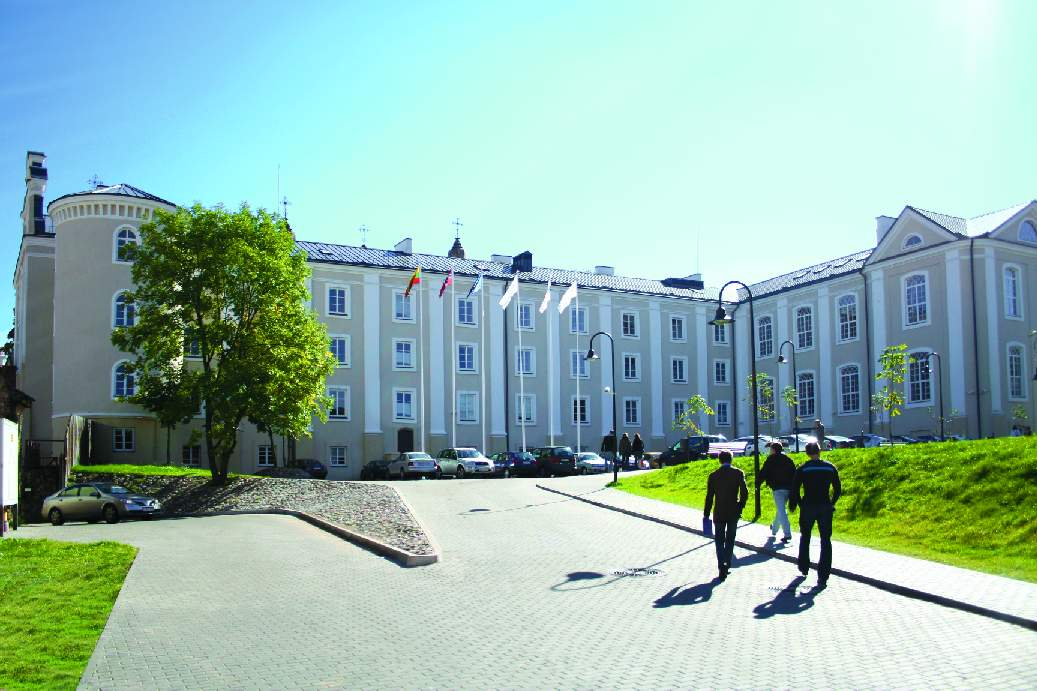
ISM campus in Vilnius

== The campus ==
ISM is located in the old town of Vilnius, the capital of Lithuania. ISM resides in the former Vilnius Central Post Office in Gediminas Avenue. The university moved to this building in 2023.

== Quality accreditation ==
- EDUNIVERSAL award
  - ISM has received an award from EDUNIVERSAL that placed ISM among the 300 top world business schools. It was granted four palms and, together with 200 business schools, was grouped under the second category “TOP Business Schools”. By this score ISM takes the leading position in Lithuania and ranks among the highest in Central and East Europe.
- International Quality Accreditation (IQA)
  - Awarded to ISM in 2006 by the Central and East European Management Development Association (CEEMAN).
- European Credit Transfer Label (ECTS label)
- Accreditation by the Lithuanian Centre for Quality Assessment in Higher Education
  - The group of international experts who carried out the accreditation of business and management study programmes at Lithuanian universities in 2005 accredited the business and management bachelor's and master's degree programmes of ISM University of Management and Economics without any additional conditions.
- ISM ranks first in the Lithuanian higher education institutions rating
  - Lithuanian weekly Veidas has published a rating of higher education institutions compiled based on eight criteria: scientific and artistic activities of universities, the highest scores of academic staff and alumni activities, academic staff qualifications, the variety of fields of study, conditions for studies, a student survey, the labour market and the structure of financing. ISM University of Management and Economics collected 63.2 points out of 100, which was the highest score among private universities, and ranked second among all Lithuanian universities.
