= China–Lithuania relations =

- China: Lithuania

Modern diplomatic relations between the People's Republic of China (PRC) and Lithuania were officially established on 14 September 1991. The PRC has a chargé d'affaires in Vilnius. In December 2021, Lithuania closed its embassy in Beijing.

== History ==
=== Early contacts ===
The first ideas to establish the contacts between, at that time, the Grand Duchy of Lithuania and China can be traced back to the 16th century, when Jesuits established the Vilnius University and set themselves a goal to spread science and Catholicism further East—especially China. The first Lithuanian missionary Andrius Rudamina arrived to Ming China in 1625.

After the Union of Lublin in 1569, the Grand Duchy of Lithuania formed the Polish–Lithuanian Commonwealth. One of the early attempts at diplomacy was in the second half of the 17th century when John III Sobieski of Poland–Lithuania attempted to negotiate friendly relations with Kangxi Emperor. In late 18th century, the Polish–Lithuanian Commonwealth began to decline and was eventually partitioned by the neighbouring powers. In 1864, following the January Uprising, some Lithuanians were deported to Siberia from where they managed to move to Manchuria.

=== 20th century ===
Lithuania restored its statehood in 1918 as a Republic of Lithuania. The Republic of China diplomatically recognized Lithuania on 14 November 1921. The relations lasted until the World War II. The ROC didn't recognize the illegal occupation of Lithuania by the Soviet Union.

Modern diplomatic relations between Lithuania and the People's Republic of China (PRC) were officially established on 14 September 1991. In 1992, the PRC's embassy was established in Vilnius, and in 1995, the Lithuanian embassy was established in Beijing.

=== 21st century ===
Lithuania joined the Belt and Road Initiative (BRI) in 2017 and withdrew in 2021 during a deterioration of relations between the European Union and China.

In August 2021, Taiwan opened its representative office in Vilnius under the name of "Taiwanese" (the first under this name in Europe), with the Lithuanian office in Taipei to open by the end of 2021. In the opinion of the Chinese government, Lithuania has thus reneged on its 1991 agreement with PRC on the establishment of diplomatic relations where Lithuania recognized the One China principle; the Lithuanian government does not consider being in breach of the agreement. In response, the PRC recalled its ambassador in Vilnius, Shen Zhifei, and demanded that Lithuania recall its ambassador in Beijing, Diana Mickevičienė. Trade between the two countries was also seriously disrupted. Relations between the PRC and Lithuania were downgraded to the level of chargé d'affaires on 21 November 2021. This is the second time China has taken diplomatic relations downgrading measures against a country since a brief period in the Netherlands between 1981 and 1984. (Note: China downgraded diplomatic relations to the chargé d'affaires level with the Netherlands due to the Dutch government after the Netherlands approved the sale of two submarines to Taiwan on 11 May 1981 until resumed diplomatic relations at the ambassadorial level on 1 February 1984.) Lithuania adviced people to stop using Chinese phones due to censorship concerns on the keyboard that is preinstalled on the phones.

On 3 December 2021, Lithuania reported that in an escalation of the diplomatic spat over relations with Taiwan, China had stopped all imports from the Baltic state. It said Beijing has delisted Lithuania as a country of origin, preventing items from clearing customs, and was rejecting all import applications. As a result of the conflict, China pressured Continental AG and other international companies to stop doing business with Lithuania. The spat spilled over to the rest of the European Union when China banned the import of goods which contained Lithuanian parts potentially disrupting integrated supply chains in the European single market. EU Ambassador to China Nicolas Chapuis supported Lithuania and attempted to intervene on their behalf. The president of the European Union Chamber of Commerce in China described the Chinese government's move as "unprecedented." In early 2022, reports emerged that German-Baltic Chamber of Commerce warned Lithuania that German-owned factories will be closed if relations with China are not improved.

Lithuanian President Gitanas Nausėda said in a radio interview in January 2022 that he thought it was a mistake to allow Taiwan to open a representative office using the name 'Taiwan' in Vilnius. These remarks were subsequently widely published across mainland Chinese media that reported Lithuania had admitted its mistake. Chinese foreign ministry spokesman Wang Wenbin said "Recognizing the mistake is a correct step, but what is more important is to take action, correct the 'One China, One Taiwan' mistaken act, and return to the principle of One China." However, political analysts quoted on the BBC claimed that Nausėda was not suggesting to make any significant change to Lithuanian policy regarding the opening of the office and improving relations with Taiwan, only that he thought it had caused an avoidable diplomatic crisis by using the name "Taiwan" rather than "Taipei" or something else as the name for the office in Vilnius.

An independent 2022 poll commissioned by the Lithuanian Ministry of Foreign Affairs showed that the Lithuanian population overwhelmingly opposes the government's policies towards China. Only 13% of Lithuanians view the policies positively. Following the poll results, opposition parties have called on the government to respect popular opinion and repair ties with Beijing. Foreign Minister Gabrielius Landsbergis claimed that the survey question was not worded accurately enough, stating: "Lithuania has de facto never changed its policy on China. China has decided to apply unannounced, most likely illegal measures against Lithuania and the European Union. [...] I would probably ask whether Lithuania should support, agree with the aspiration of Taiwan's people to be called Taiwanese, instead of asking about Lithuania's policy on China." China's acting chargé d'affaires in Lithuania, Qu Baihua, responded by saying that unsanctioned visits by Lithuanian government officials that include agreements with sovereignty implications violate the One China policy that Lithuania agreed to.

In November 2023, Landsbergis said that China and Lithuania were in talks about the normalization of relations and the return of ambassadors. A year later, following the defeat of the incumbent coalition in the 2024 Lithuanian parliamentary election, the new presumptive Prime Minister Gintautas Paluckas of the LSDP pledged to re-establish full diplomatic relations with China. Paluckas described the previous government's decision to allow a representative office under the Taiwanese title as a "grave diplomatic mistake", but declined to announce any plans on the office's future. In April 2024, two Lithuanian lawmakers belonging to the Inter-Parliamentary Alliance on China (IPAC) were reported to have been targeted by China's Ministry of State Security-linked hacking group APT31. In November 2024, Lithuania passed a law blocking Chinese access to wind and solar farms larger than 100 kW. The same month, Lithuania declared three Chinese diplomats personae non grata. Prime Minister-designate Paluckas claimed that he had not been informed about the decision to expel the diplomats.

In July 2025 Monday, Lithuania and the Philippines signed a memorandum of understanding to establish a security partnership, driven by shared concerns over perceived increasing aggression in their respective regions by states such as China. The agreement, signed in Manila by Lithuanian Defence Minister Dovilė Šakalienė and Philippine Defence Secretary Gilberto Teodoro Jr., seeks to enhance bilateral defence cooperation, with a particular focus on cybersecurity and collaboration in defence industries. In August 2025, China's Ministry of Commerce banned Lithuanians banks UAB Urbo Bankas and Mano Bankas AB from having any cooperation with individuals or institutions in China.

On 3 February 2026, Lithuanian Prime Minister Inga Ruginienė stated that Lithuania allowed to open a Taiwanese representative office under the name "Taiwanese" is a strategic mistake. She also stated that "Lithuania really jumped in front of a train and lost". Lithuanian President Gitanas Nausėda said restoring diplomatic relations with China would require goodwill from both sides. He also stated that there are risks if Lithuania is 'overly close' with China. In response, Chinese Foreign Ministry spokesperson Lin Jian said that China remained open to dialogue with Lithuania, adding that Lithuania should translate its stated willingness to improve bilateral relations into concrete actions. On 11 February, Ruginienė said that Taiwanese Representative Office could be renamed after Taipei.

== Human rights criticisms ==
In June 2020, Lithuania openly opposed the Hong Kong national security law in a statement given at the United Nations Human Rights Council. Later, in May 2021, the Seimas passed a resolution that recognized the China's persecution of Uyghurs as genocide and called for the PRC's government to revoke the Hong Kong national security law.

In March 2021, the PRC blacklisted Lithuanian MP Dovilė Šakalienė because of her comments regarding the state of human rights in mainland China.

On 19 November 2021, group of members of Lithuanian national parliament (Seimas) released an official letter encouraging Lithuania to withdraw from the 2022 Winter Olympics due to human rights violations in China. Daina Gudzinevičiūtė, president of National Olympic Committee of Lithuania, released a statement stating that the Olympic games should be politically neutral and confirmed that committee has no plans to boycott the games.

== See also ==
- Foreign relations of the People's Republic of China
- Foreign relations of the Republic of China
- Foreign relations of Lithuania
- Lithuania–Taiwan relations
