= Taiwanese Representative Office, Vilnius =

Taiwanese Representative Office in Lithuania
- Chinese: 駐立陶宛台灣代表處; Lithuanian: Taivano atstovybė Lietuvoje
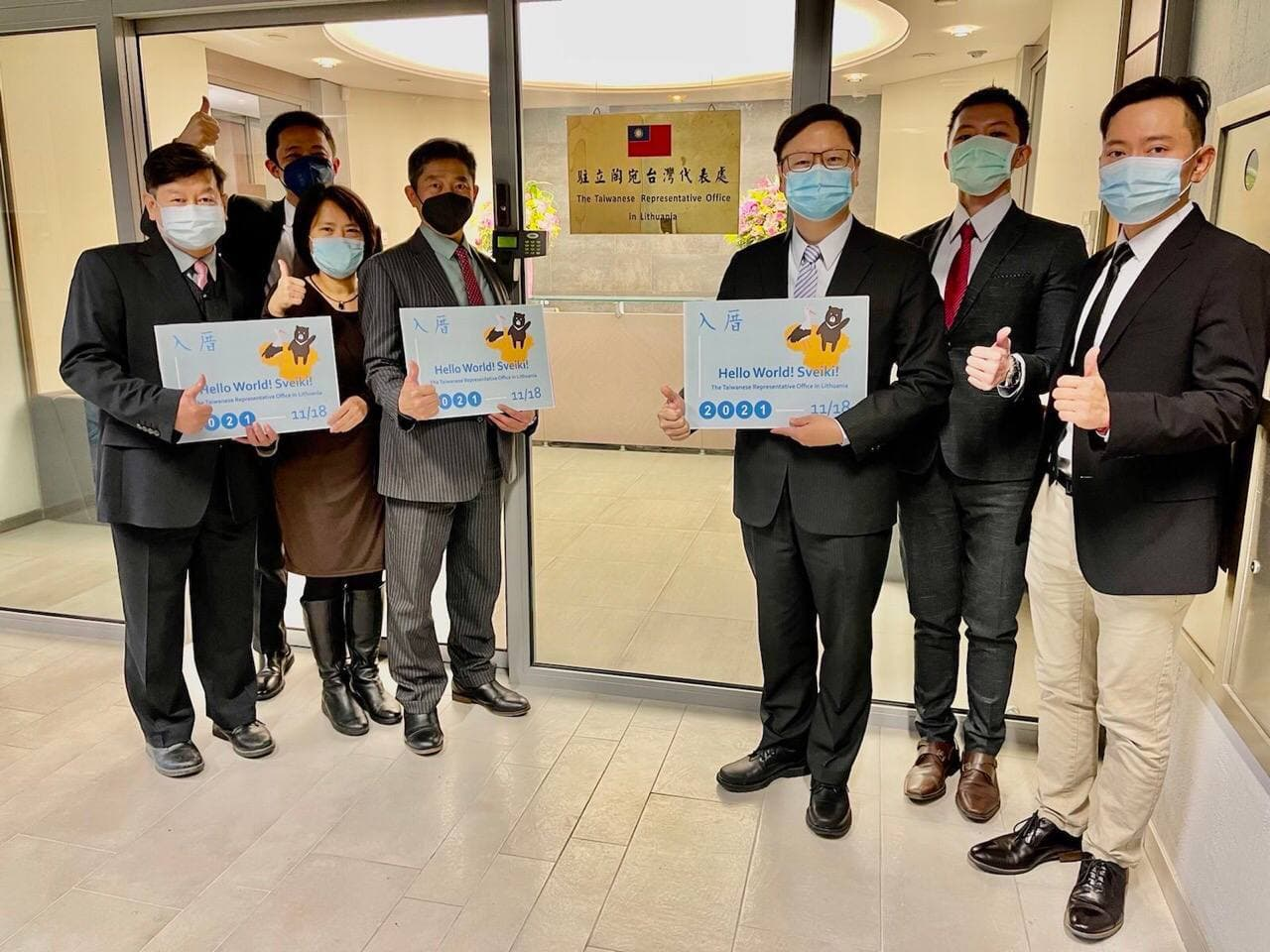

Agency overview
- Formed: 18 November 2021; 4 years ago
- Jurisdiction: Lithuania
- Headquarters: Vilnius, Lithuania
- Agency executive: Constance H. Wang, Representative
- Website: www.roc-taiwan.org/lt

The Taiwanese Representative Office in Lithuania (Chinese: 駐立陶宛台灣代表處; Lithuanian: Taivano atstovybė Lietuvoje) is the representative office of Taiwan responsible for the development of relations with Lithuania. As Lithuania has not established official diplomatic relations with Taiwan, the mission does not have diplomatic status but can be considered as a de facto embassy. It is Taiwan's first and only representative office with "Taiwan" instead of "Taipei" in its title in a European country without official relations with Taiwan, and the first such office in the world that uses the adjective "Taiwanese".

== History ==
Prior to the establishment of the office, Taiwan's consular affairs in Lithuania were conducted by the Taipei Mission in the Republic of Latvia. Closer relations between Lithuania and Taiwan began to develop more actively after 2020 at the end of the Seimas elections. The agreement of the ruling coalition set out to increase support for Taiwan. Gabrielius Landsbergis, the new Minister of Foreign Affairs announced discussions on the Lithuanian business representative office in Taiwan, and a few months later on plans to open a Taiwanese representative office in Lithuania. In response to plans in opening the office, spokesperson of the Taiwan Affairs Office (TAO) of the State Council of the People's Republic of China Zhu Fenglian issued a statement urging Lithuania to strictly abide by the one-China principle and to "not send the wrong signal to Taiwanese independence forces."

Following its opening, the People's Republic of China (PRC), which sees Taiwan as part of its territory, has imposed a series of sanctions on Lithuania in retaliation.

== Present ==
Eric Huang, former head of Taiwan's representative office in Lithuania, announced that Taiwan will create an investment of 200 million USD fund, which will be used for investments in the Lithuanian industry. And the country has already announced that it has taken over or promises to take over 120 sea containers with Lithuanian goods that China did not allow to enter mainland China.

Starting January 15, 2024, Constance H. Wang is the new head of Taiwan's representative office in Lithuania.

In May 2024, due to the ongoing souring of diplomatic relations between China and Lithuania following the opening of the office, President of Lithuania Gitanas Nausėda stated in an interview that while he welcomed the establishment of the office, but in the context of normalization of relations with China, there would be a need to change its name. In response to Nausėda's comments, Minister of Foreign Affairs of Taiwan Joseph Wu stated that the office's name that was agreed on in 2021 by the Governments of Lithuania and Taiwan, after negotiations and signing of documents. He also further stated that Taiwan had not received any official request for name change and would not accept it even if such request was received. According to Taiwan's new Foreign Minister Lin Chia-lung, "Bilateral discussions will be needed if either side wishes to amend the decision." In April 2025, Lithuanian lawmaker Remigijus Motuzas stated that although Lithuania has focused in restoring its diplomatic relations with China, it has no intention of changing the name of the office.

On 3 February 2026, Lithuanian Prime Minister Inga Ruginienė stated that Lithuania allowed to open a Taiwanese representative office under the name "Taiwanese" is a strategic mistake. She also stated that "Lithuania really jumped in front of a train and lost". On 11 February, Ruginienė said that Taiwanese Representative Office could be renamed after Taipei.

== Heads ==
Heads of the Taiwanese Representative office in Vilnius:

1. Eric Huang (黃鈞耀), November 18, 2021 - January 14, 2024
2. Constance H. Wang, since January 15, 2024

== See also ==
- Lithuania-Taiwan relations
- Ministry of Foreign Affairs (Taiwan)
- Ministry of Foreign Affairs (Lithuania)
