= Agnė Vaiciukevičiūtė =

Lithuanian politician (born 1989)

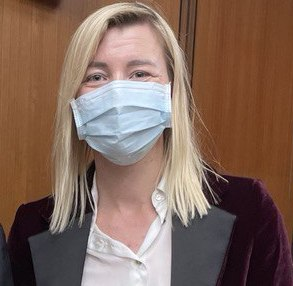
Agnė Vaiciukevičiūtė

Agnė Vaiciukevičiūtė (born 17 June 1989) is a Lithuanian politician and the current deputy minister of Transport and Communications of Lithuania.

== Education ==
She graduated from the Mykolas Biržiška Gymnasium in Vilnius in 2008 and following enrolled into the Vilnius Technical University to study business management from where she obtained a BSc in 2012 and a MSc in social sciences in 2019.

== Academic career ==
She was employed as a researcher by several think tanks such as the Center for European Policy Analysis in Washington, D.C. or the Centre of Excellence in Population Ageing Research (CEPAR) in Australia. She became the Vilnius Tech's Vice-Dean of Strategic Partnership in 2016, a post she held until 2020. In 2020 she became an associate professor at the Business Management Department of Vilnius Technical University.

== Political career ==
She was the public advisor to the municipal council of Vilnius between 2015/2016 and a co-founder of the Freedom Party in 2020. Since January 2021, she is the Deputy Minister of Transport and Communications. After a four-day visit to Taiwan in August 2022, China imposed sanctions on her.
